= St Paul's High School, Glasgow =

Coordinates: 55°49′30″N 4°20′16″W

Saint Paul's R.C. High School

Location
- 36 Damshot Road; Glasgow; Scotland

Information
- Type: Comprehensive school
- Motto: Aiming High for Young People
- Religious affiliation: Roman Catholic
- Head teacher: TBC
- Teaching staff: 70
- Enrollment: 1200
- Accreditation: Schools of Ambition

St Paul's High School is a co-educational, Roman Catholic, comprehensive secondary school located in Pollok, Glasgow, Scotland. It was built on the site of, and using some buildings from, the former Craigbank Secondary School, to replace the previous Catholic school in the area, Bellarmine Secondary (the Silverburn Centre is now at its location), opening with its new identity in 2002.

The majority of the Pollok district falls into the catchment area of a different school, Lourdes Secondary, while St Paul's serves communities further south including Arden, Carnwadric, Darnley, Deaconsbank, Eastwood, Househillwood, Kennishead, Nitshill, Parkhouse and Priesthill.
