= Greater Pollok (ward) =

Electoral ward in Glasgow, Scotland

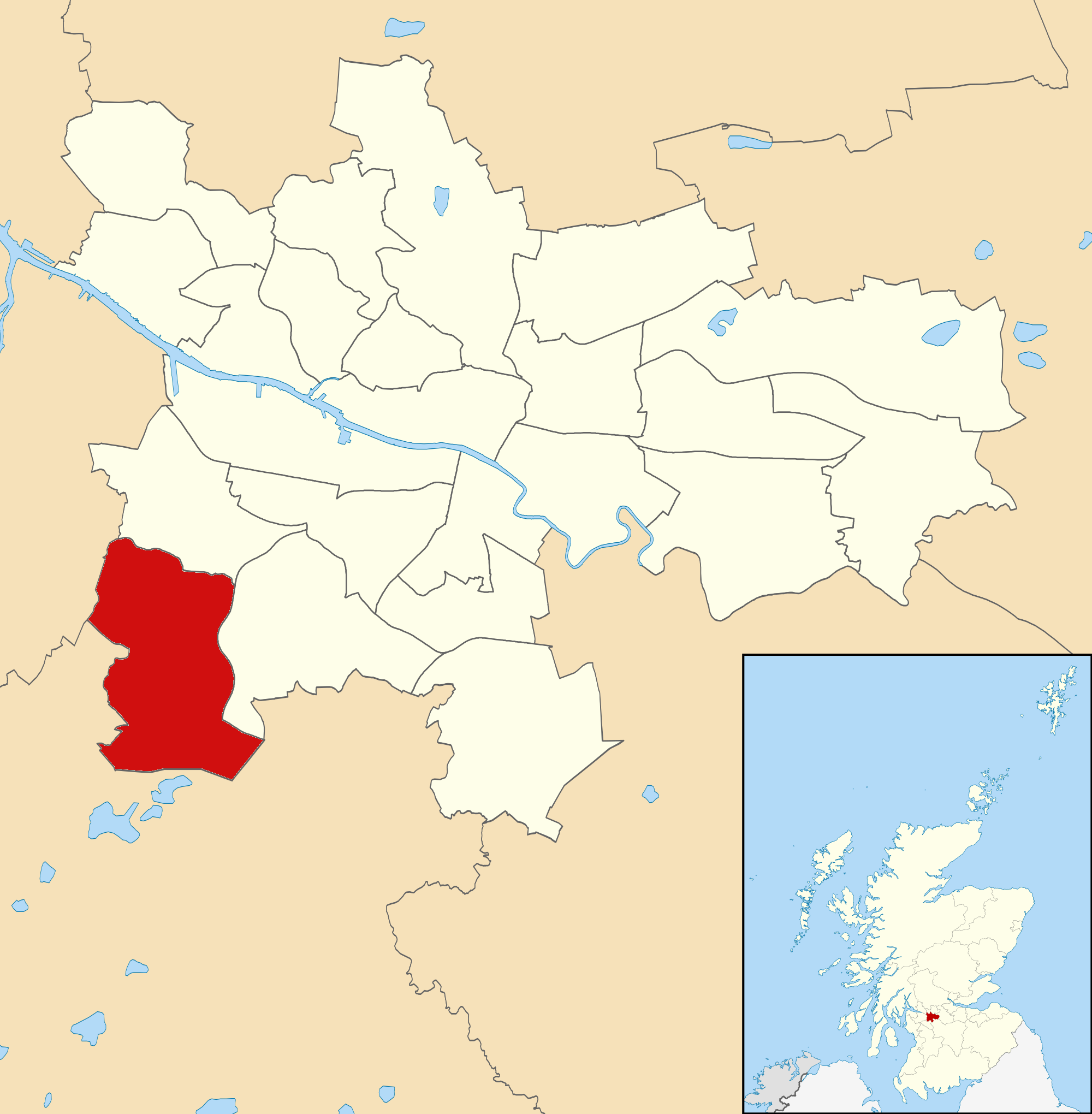
- Greater Pollok Ward (2017) within Glasgow

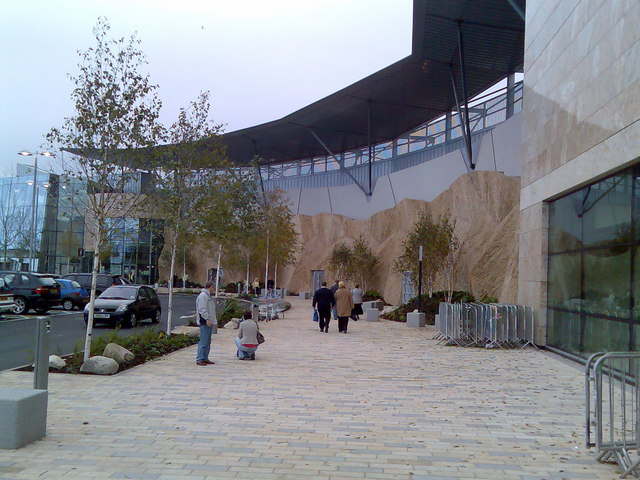
- Silverburn Shopping Centre in the Greater Pollok ward
- Area: 11.7 km^{2} (4.5 sq mi)
- Population: 30,729 (2017)
  - Density: 2,626.4/km^{2} (6,802/sq mi)
- Council area: Glasgow City Council
- Lieutenancy area: Glasgow
- Country: Scotland
- Sovereign state: United Kingdom
- Post town: GLASGOW
- Postcode district: G46, G53
- Dialling code: 0141
- Police: Scotland
- Fire: Scottish
- Ambulance: Scottish

Greater Pollok (Ward 3) is one of the 23 wards of Glasgow City Council. Since its creation in 2007 it has returned four council members, using the single transferable vote system.

== Boundaries ==
Located in the south-west of Glasgow adjoining the Renfrewshire region to the west and East Renfrewshire to the south, the ward includes most of Pollok (excluding the northern Lyoncross/Templeland area north of the Levern Water which falls under Cardonald ward) as well as Priesthill, Househillwood, Darnley, Hurlet, Nitshill, South Nitshill, Jenny Lind, Parkhouse, Roughmussel, Southpark Village, Deaconsbank and the southern part of Crookston.

A 2017 boundary change removed the Arden neighbourhood which was re-assigned to the Newlands/Auldburn ward. Following these changes, it was the ward with the highest population in the city, although also covering the third-largest area.

The ethnic makeup of the Greater Pollok ward using the 2011 census population statistics was:

- 88.5% White Scottish / British / Irish / Other
- 9.8% Asian (Mainly Pakistani)
- 1% Black (Mainly African)
- 0.5% Mixed / Other Ethnic Group

== Councillors ==
| Election | Councillors | | | |
|---|---|---|---|---|
| 2007 | Alex Glass (Labour) | Tommy Morrison (Labour) | William O'Rouke (Labour) | Patricia Duffy (SNP) |
| 2012 | Bill Butler (Labour) | Rashid Hussain (Labour) | David McDonald (SNP) | Shabbar Jaffri (SNP) |
| 2017 | Saqib Ahmed (Labour) | Rashid Hussain (Labour) | David McDonald (SNP) | Rhiannon Spear (SNP) |
| 2022 | Saqib Ahmed (Labour) | Rashid Hussain (Labour) | William Graham (SNP) | Roza Salih (SNP) |

== Election results ==
=== 2022 election ===
2022 Glasgow City Council election

Greater Pollok – 4 seats
| Party | Candidate | FPv% | Count | | | | | | | | | |
| Party | Candidate | FPv% | 1 | 2 | 3 | 4 | 5 | 6 | 7 | 8 | 9 | 10 |
|---|---|---|---|---|---|---|---|---|---|---|---|---|
| Labour | Saqib Ahmed (incumbent) | 29.3 | 2,598 | | | | | | | | | |
| SNP | William Graham | 28.1 | 2,494 | | | | | | | | | |
| Labour | Rashid Hussain (incumbent) | 14.4 | 1,278 | 1,957 | | | | | | | | |
| SNP | Roza Salih | 10.3 | 917 | 931 | 1,486 | 1,511 | 1,512 | 1,519 | 1,528 | 1,573 | 1,597 | 1,855 |
| Conservative | Matt Ventisei | 9.4 | 833 | 859 | 862 | 883 | 891 | 898 | 920 | 926 | 959 | 983 |
| Green | Chris McFadyen | 3.9 | 349 | 361 | 419 | 431 | 436 | 450 | 477 | 511 | 540 | |
| Liberal Democrats | Awais Quershi | 1.3 | 120 | 130 | 135 | 152 | 157 | 161 | 165 | 172 | | |
| Alba | Tahir Jameel | 1.0 | 92 | 100 | 117 | 123 | 129 | 131 | 141 | | | |
| Scottish Family | Paul Laird | 1.0 | 91 | 96 | 106 | 112 | 121 | 130 | | | | |
| TUSC | Eric Stevenson | 0.6 | 51 | 55 | 57 | 64 | 70 | | | | | |
| UKIP | Christopher Ho | 0.5 | 46 | 53 | 57 | 60 | | | | | | |
Electorate: 25,241 Valid: 8,869 Spoilt: 269 Quota: 1,774 Turnout: 36.2%

=== 2017 election ===
2017 Glasgow City Council election

Greater Pollok – 4 seats
| Party | Candidate | FPv% | Count | | | | | | | | | |
| Party | Candidate | FPv% | 1 | 2 | 3 | 4 | 5 | 6 | 7 | 8 | 9 | 10 |
|---|---|---|---|---|---|---|---|---|---|---|---|---|
| SNP | David McDonald (incumbent) | 31,02% | 2,643 | | | | | | | | | |
| Labour | Saqib Ahmed | 25.97% | 2,213 | | | | | | | | | |
| SNP | Rhiannon Spear | 9.53% | 812 | 1,566 | 1,575 | 1,580 | 1,597 | 1,608 | 1,636 | 1,747 | | |
| Labour | Rashid Hussain (incumbent) | 12.19% | 1,039 | 1,083 | 1,508 | 1,511 | 1,523 | 1,556 | 1,591 | 1,654 | 1,665 | 2,106 |
| Conservative | Rory O'Brien | 13.94% | 1,188 | 1,199 | 1,208 | 1,211 | 1,218 | 1,253 | 1,297 | 1,329 | 1,330 | |
| Green | Seonad Hoy | 2.35% | 200 | 233 | 243 | 246 | 273 | 298 | 333 | | | |
| Independent | George Laird | 1.91% | 163 | 172 | 179 | 201 | 212 | 229 | | | | |
| Liberal Democrats | Will Millinship | 1.54% | 131 | 141 | 146 | 151 | 157 | | | | | |
| TUSC | Mark McGowan | 0.90% | 77 | 89 | 92 | 95 | | | | | | |
| Independent | Dean Ward | 0.63% | 54 | 59 | 59 | | | | | | | |
Electorate: 24,050 Valid: 8,520 Spoilt: 268 Quota: 1,705 Turnout: 36.5%

=== 2012 election ===
2012 Glasgow City Council election

Greater Pollok – 4 seats
| Party | Candidate | FPv% | Count | | | | | | | | | | |
| Party | Candidate | FPv% | 1 | 2 | 3 | 4 | 5 | 6 | 7 | 8 | 9 | 10 | 11 |
|---|---|---|---|---|---|---|---|---|---|---|---|---|---|
| Labour | Bill Butler | 34.40% | 2,462 | | | | | | | | | | |
| Labour | Rashid Hussain | 13.25% | 948 | 1,684 | | | | | | | | | |
| SNP | David McDonald (Note: Outgoing Councillor from Baillieston ward.) | 19.85% | 1,421 | 1,472 | | | | | | | | | |
| SNP | Shabbar Jaffri | 14.18% | 1,015 | 1,036 | 1,080 | 1,109 | 1,122 | 1,137 | 1,167 | 1,193 | 1,211 | 1,233 | 1,343 |
| Glasgow First | William O'Rourke (incumbent) | 5.16% | 369 | 404 | 425 | 426 | 431 | 435 | 452 | 481 | 676 | 752 | |
| Conservative | Chris Morgan | 3.73% | 267 | 281 | 287 | 288 | 310 | 332 | 338 | 356 | 369 | | |
| Glasgow First | Tommy Morrison (incumbent) | 3.07% | 220 | 250 | 269 | 271 | 288 | 295 | 310 | 347 | | | |
| Green | Juliet Neal | 2.11% | 151 | 168 | 181 | 183 | 194 | 218 | 255 | | | | |
| Scottish Socialist | Ian Beattie | 1.94% | 139 | 152 | 163 | 164 | 168 | 172 | | | | | |
| Liberal Democrats | Norman Fraser | 1.12% | 80 | 98 | 104 | 104 | 108 | | | | | | |
| Scottish Christian | Archie Linnegan | 1.19% | 85 | 91 | 95 | 96 | | | | | | | |
Electorate: 24,096 Valid: 7,157 Spoilt: 200 Quota: 1,432 Turnout: 30.53%

=== 2007 election ===
2007 Glasgow City Council election

2007 Council election: Greater Pollok (4 members)
| Party | Candidate | FPv% | Count | | | | | | |
| Party | Candidate | FPv% | 1 | 2 | 3 | 4 | 5 | 6 | 7 |
|---|---|---|---|---|---|---|---|---|---|
| SNP | Patricia Duffy | 25.03 | 2,173 | | | | | | |
| Labour | Alex Glass (Note: Outgoing councillor for Nitshill single-member ward.) | 18.86 | 1,637 | 1,680 | 1,701 | 1,801 | | | |
| Labour | Tommy Morrison††††††††† | 13.59 | 1,180 | 1,201 | 1,219 | 1,258 | 1,290 | 1,389 | 1,527 |
| Labour | William O'Rourke (Note: Outgoing councillor for Crookston single-member ward.)†††† | 14.93 | 1,296 | 1,313 | 1,327 | 1,355 | 1,368 | 1,410 | 1,494 |
| Solidarity | Alice Sheridan | 7.26 | 630 | 693 | 725 | 771 | 773 | 812 | 1,022 |
| Scottish Socialist | Keith Baldassara (Note: Outgoing councillor for Pollok single-member ward.) | 6.81 | 591 | 637 | 661 | 693 | 695 | 739 | |
| Conservative | Rory O'Brien | 6.32 | 549 | 572 | 592 | 674 | 675 | | |
| Liberal Democrats | Fleming Carswell | 4.53 | 393 | 431 | 502 | | | | |
| Green | Caroline Scott | 2.68 | 233 | 275 | | | | | |
Electorate: 22,106 Valid: 8,682 Spoilt: 244 Quota: 1,737 Turnout: 40.38%

== See also ==
- Wards of Glasgow
