= Nitshill =

Coordinates: 55.815144°N 4.362925°W

Nitshill: Scottish Gaelic: Cnoc nan Cnòthan
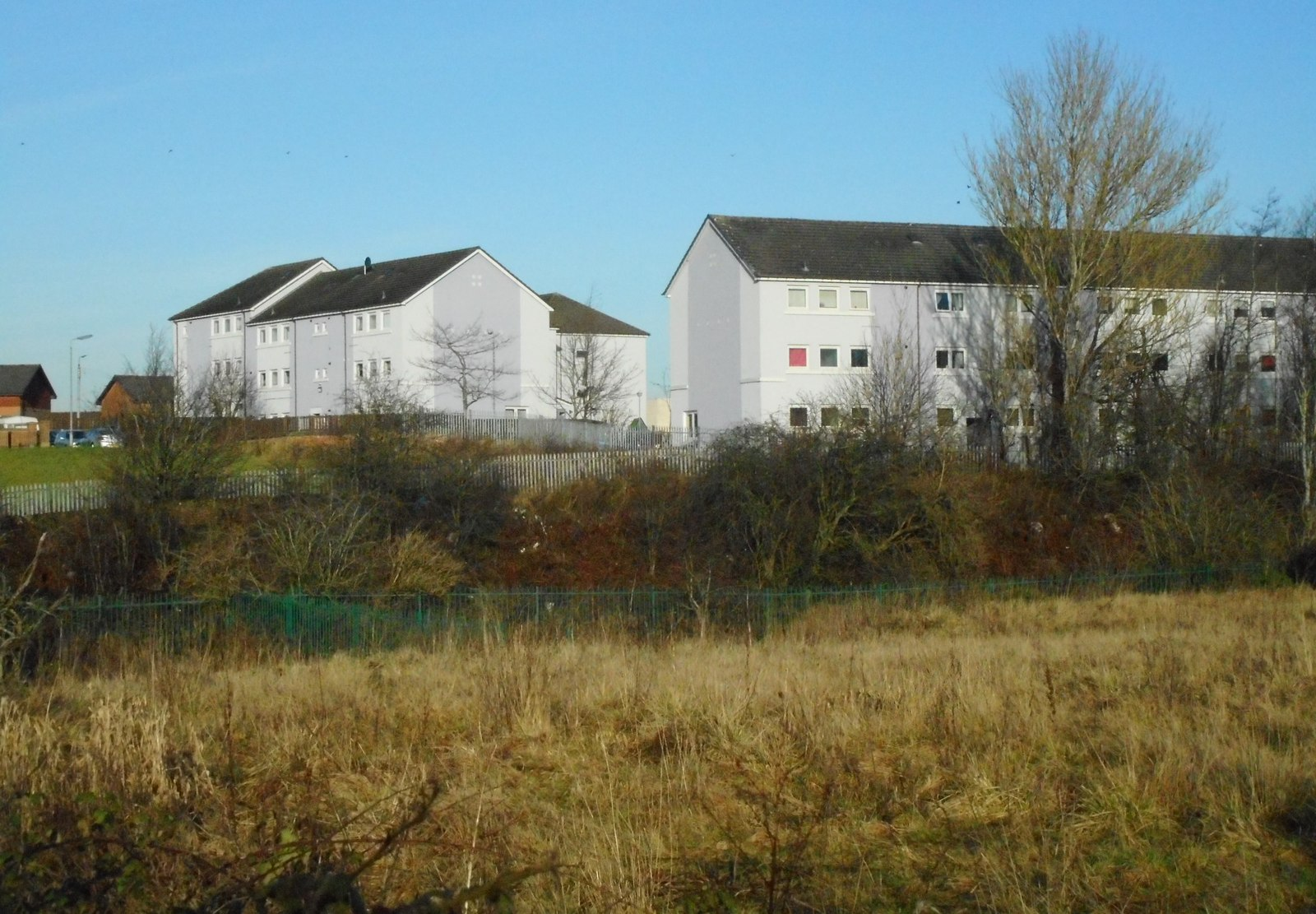
- Refurbished flats on Pinmore Street (2018)

- Location within Glasgow
- OS grid reference: NS520605
- Council area: Glasgow City Council
- Lieutenancy area: Glasgow
- Country: Scotland
- Sovereign state: United Kingdom
- Post town: Glasgow
- Postcode district: G53
- Dialling code: 0141
- Police: Scotland
- Fire: Scottish
- Ambulance: Scottish
- UK Parliament: Glasgow South West
- Scottish Parliament: Glasgow Pollok

Nitshill (Scottish Gaelic: Cnoc nan Cnòthan) is a district on the south side of Glasgow. It is bordered by South Nitshill to the south, Darnley to the east, Crookston and Roughmussel to the north-west, Hurlet to the west and Househillwood and Priesthill to the north, with the Pollok district and the Silverburn Centre beyond. An area of open ground to the south-west of Nitshill forms the boundary between Glasgow and the town of Barrhead in East Renfrewshire.

Nitshill was originally a coal mining village; the Victoria Colliery in the area was the scene of one of Scotland's worst mining disasters on 15 March 1851, in which 61 men and boys died.

== History ==
The village fell within the county of Renfrewshire until 1926, when it was incorporated into the City of Glasgow. The change in local government was mainly related to education and community services such as roads, water, sewerage and housing.

Consisting of just a few streets prior to its incorporation into Glasgow, Nitshill grew on a small scale with cottage flats prior to World War II, after which it was substantially expanded to accommodate people relocated during the Glasgow slum clearances in the 1950s and 1960s.

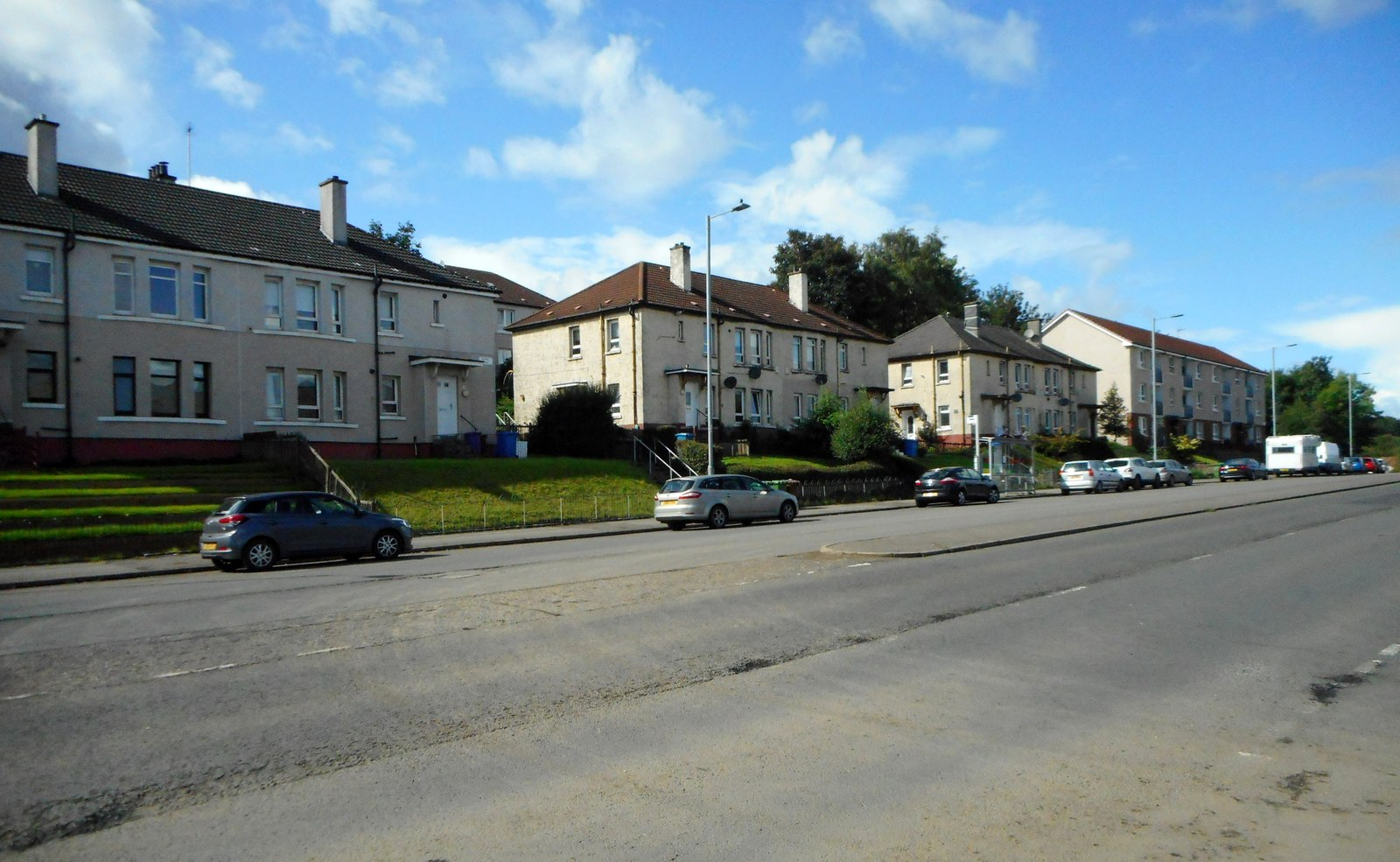
1920s cottage flats on Nitshill Road

The wider area, sited on the main Glasgow-Kilmarnock road and rail networks and including the post-WWII housing schemes of South Nitshill and Craigbank (as well as Priesthill in some reckonings), became increasingly marked by multiple socio-economic issues. However, there has been a move towards improving the district with the regeneration/demolition of much of the housing and schools, and the building of The Glasgow Museums Resource Centre, a purpose-built museum storage facility and visitor centre (technically located within South Nitshill) which houses the Nitshill Open Museum. There is one small tower block in the area, adjacent to the shopping precinct, the only such structure in that part of Glasgow (over 200 were constructed across the city).

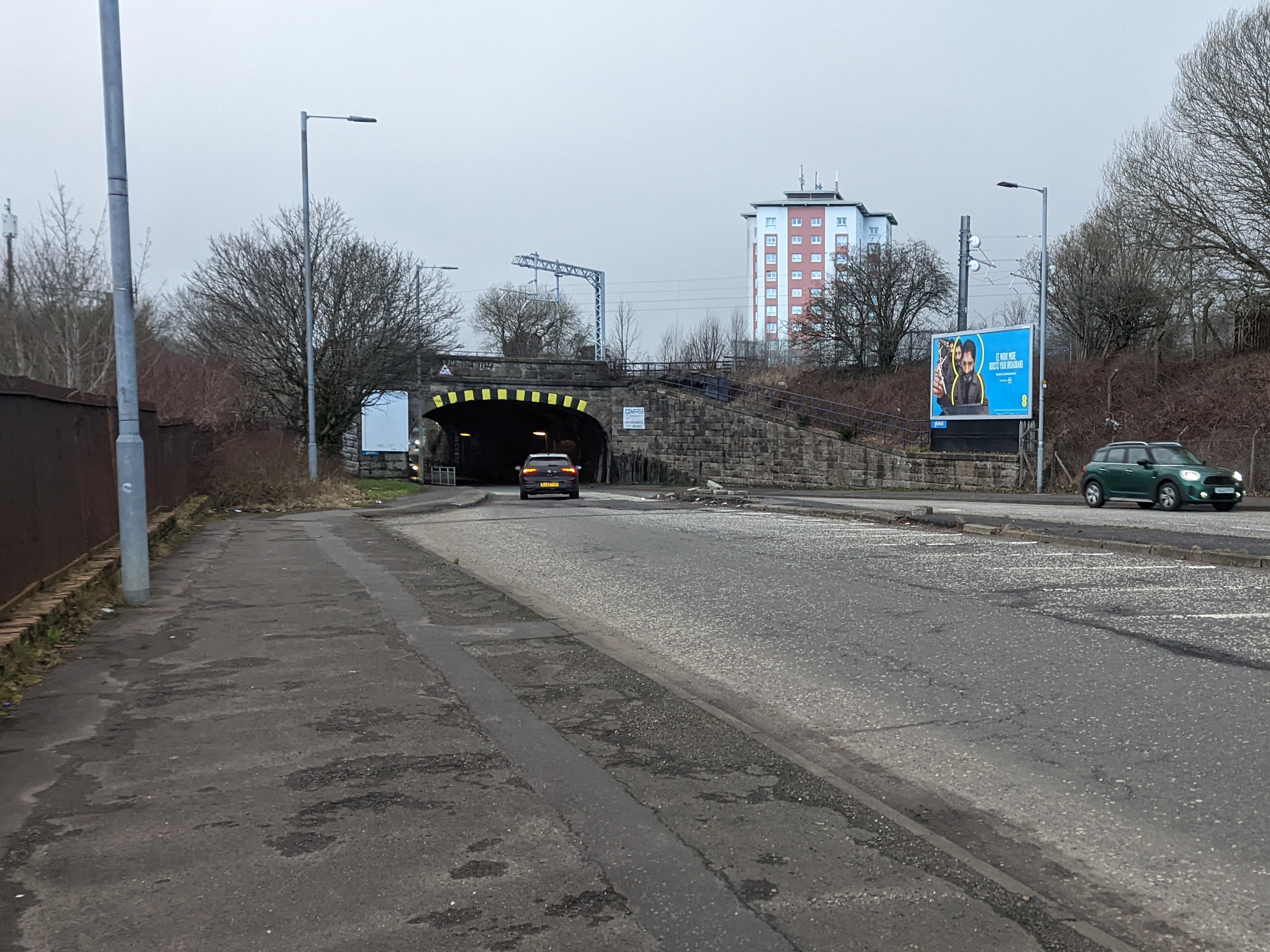
Tunnel under railway east of Nitshill Station

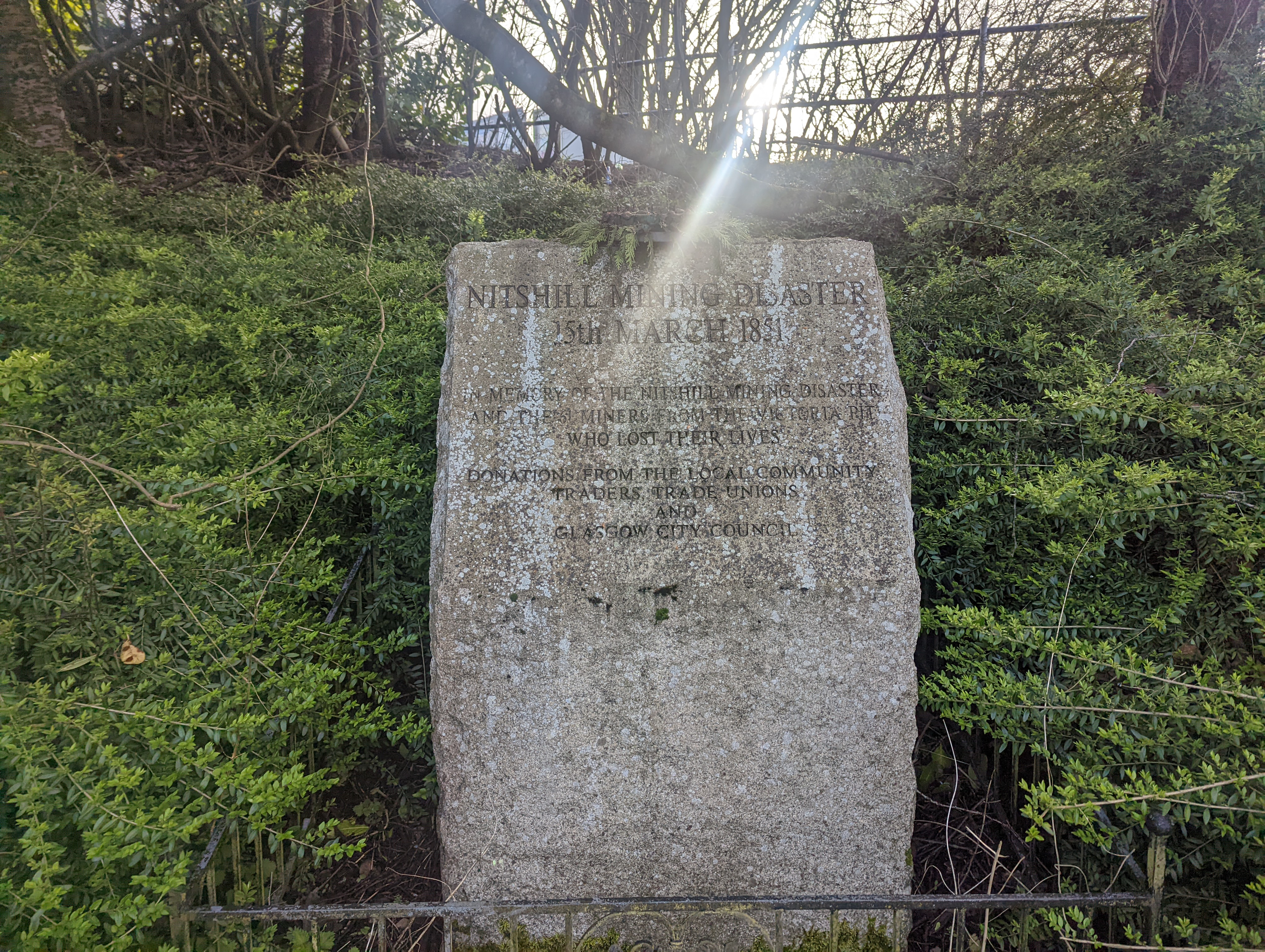
Nitshill mining disaster memorial

Part of the city's Greater Pollok ward, Nitshill is classed as a low socio-economic area. Studies have confirmed a strong association between deprivation and crime. It is no surprise, therefore, to find that the highest rates of crime in residential areas in Glasgow are to be found in the most deprived areas of the city. This link was highlighted in a report relating to a knife murder committed by a bar manager in a Nitshill pub in 2010.

Nitshill railway station is on the Glasgow South Western Line and has a memorial to the former station clerk John Meikle, killed in action in France in 1918, aged 19, and awarded a posthumous Victoria Cross. The railway line is the southern boundary of Nitshill proper (South Nitshill has a close association with the older part, and residents of the modern developments at Parkhouse further south also make use of the local amenities on Nitshill Road). The northern limit is the Levern Water, where the early 2000s housing estate of Levernbank is situated.

The poet and folk singer Jock Purdon was born and grew up in Nitshill.

== Victoria coal pit disaster ==
On 15 March 1851, an explosion at the Victoria coal pit killed 61 of the 63 men and boys in the mine at the time. Two survivors were rescued 45 hours after the explosion. A memorial to the disaster stands off the main road at Nitshill station, beside the local war memorial.

The plaque reads:

NITSHILL MINING DISASTER
15th MARCH 1851

IN MEMORY OF THE NITSHILL MINING DISASTER
AND THE 61 MINERS FROM THE VICTORIA PIT
WHO LOST THEIR LIVES

DONATIONS FROM THE LOCAL COMMUNITY
TRADERS, TRADE UNIONS
AND
GLASGOW CITY COUNCIL

== See also ==
- Glasgow tower blocks
