= Househillwood =

Area of Glasgow

Coordinates: 55.821704°N 4.349623°W

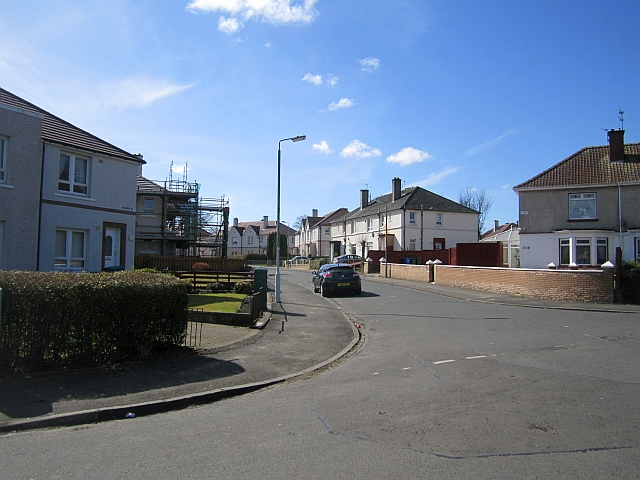
- Hartstone Road

- Location within Glasgow
- OS grid reference: NS530611
- Council area: Glasgow City Council
- Lieutenancy area: Glasgow
- Country: Scotland
- Sovereign state: United Kingdom
- Post town: Glasgow
- Postcode district: G53 6
- Dialling code: 0141
- Police: Scotland
- Fire: Scottish
- Ambulance: Scottish
- UK Parliament: Glasgow South West
- Scottish Parliament: Glasgow Pollok

Househillwood is a residential neighbourhood of Glasgow, Scotland, situated in the south-west of the city.

== Location and history ==
Househillwood is close to the centre of the Pollok district and is often considered to be part of 'Greater Pollok' (a ward of Glasgow City Council), although the construction of Househillwood in the 1930s (about 800 homes) predates the Pollok scheme's main period of building after World War II. It was also established prior to the adjoining neighbourhoods to the south, Priesthill and Craigbank (the latter generally considered part of Nitshill). Maps of these areas show a continuation of streets and a similar building style, namely cottage flats and terraced houses, but at ground level there are noticeable differences between the designs of the different decades, the final streets belonging to Househillwood being Brock Road and Hartstone Road. The layout of the streets is fairly symmetrical, with the main Peat Road running through the centre of the neighbourhood. The only modern housing, developed in 2016, is built on the site of a school.

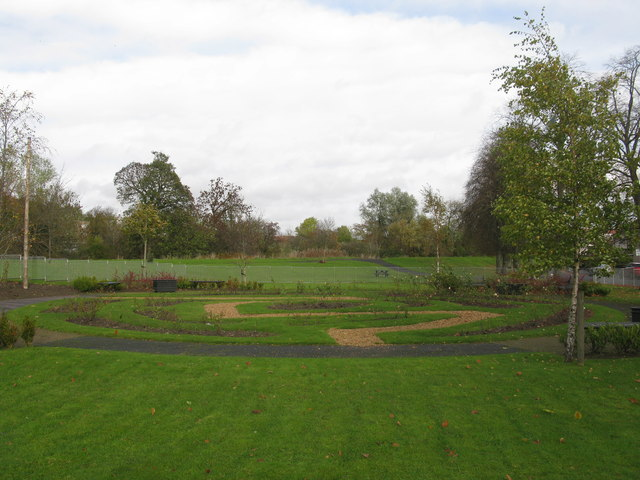
Rose Garden in Househill Park

It is flanked to the west by Househill Park, which features a play area and small rose garden with the Levern Water flowing through it, and was the location of Hous'hill, the local country house (dating from the early 1800s and once home to team room entrepreneur Catherine Cranston) until its demolition following a fire, shortly before the building of the housing estate – the rest of the surrounding land in the area was open woodland or farmers' fields. To the east is the Silverburn Centre (a large 'out of town' retail, dining and cinema complex) and the Brock Burn; the two waters converge a short distance to the north.

There are few amenities in Househillwood itself, with the closest churches and schools located in Priesthill and Craigbank along with the local housing office, and others (health centre, library, sports centre, bus station) at the Pollok civic realm immediately to the north adjacent to Silverburn. The closest railway stations are Nitshill and Priesthill & Darnley, both located to the south on the Glasgow South Western Line.

Actor Alex Norton and newspaper columnist Tom Shields (The Herald 'Diary') were brought up in the area.
