= Parkhouse, Glasgow G53 =

Coordinates: 55.804685°N 4.358321°W

Parkhouse: Scottish Gaelic: Taigh na Pàirce
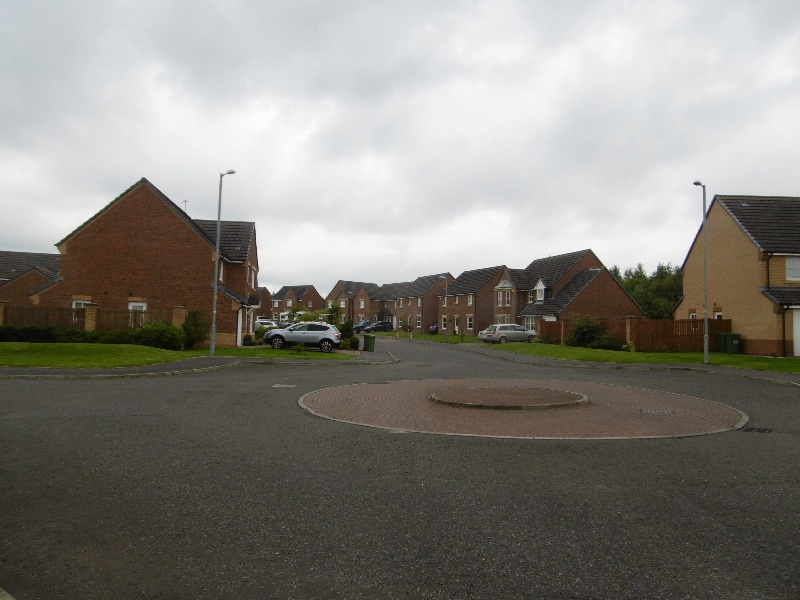
- Houses on Parkmanor Avenue

- Location within Glasgow
- OS grid reference: NS522593
- Council area: Glasgow City Council
- Lieutenancy area: Glasgow
- Country: Scotland
- Sovereign state: United Kingdom
- Post town: Glasgow
- Postcode district: G53 7
- Dialling code: 0141
- Police: Scotland
- Fire: Scottish
- Ambulance: Scottish
- UK Parliament: Glasgow South West
- Scottish Parliament: Glasgow Pollok

Parkhouse is a residential neighbourhood of Glasgow, Scotland close to the border with East Renfrewshire. It is located on the south-western edge of the city, close to the towns of Barrhead and Newton Mearns in East Renfrewshire. Within the G53 postcode area and the Greater Pollok ward of the Glasgow City Council administration, the eastern cluster of private housing was constructed in the 1980s (branching off Craigflower Road) and the western part in the 2010s, prior to which it was open farmland annexed to Glasgow in 1938.

It is one of two places in Glasgow called Parkhouse, the other being an older housing development near Milton in the far north of the city. However, they are rarely confused as neither is particularly well known outside local circles, and wider discussions of issues affecting the neighbourhoods take place under the names of their wider wards or constituencies.

== Location and history ==
Parkhouse forms part of the edge of the Glasgow urban area, occupying an area of land to the south of Parkhouse Road (B773), a main route running east–west between southern Glasgow and the town of Barrhead in East Renfrewshire which lies about 1 mile (2 km) to the west. Named after the long-established Parkhouse Farm, which still stands beside the western end of its Glasgow portion, the thoroughfare becomes Darnley Road once in East Renfrewshire. During World War II, an Anti-aircraft battery was set up on open land which roughly corresponds to Langford Drive; no traces of this facility survive.

On the northern side of Parkhouse Road is South Nitshill, a 1950s council housing scheme which was almost entirely redeveloped in the early 21st century, so that its new homes were constructed more recently than many of those in the more recently established Parkhouse; however in the 2010s Parkhouse was extended with a sizeable private housing development, street names of which are all prefixed with 'Park' - Parkdale, Parkholm, Parkmanor and Parkmeadow. At the eastern end of the main road (the junction with the major A726 Nitshill Road) is the historic 'category B' Listed Darnley Mill which has been converted into a restaurant. Beyond that lies the Darnley district, comprising a residential area with community facilities, a small park and an industrial estate.

Parkhouse is bounded to its south and east by the Dams to Darnley Country Park, with several pedestrian access points to park footpaths within the neighbourhood streets.

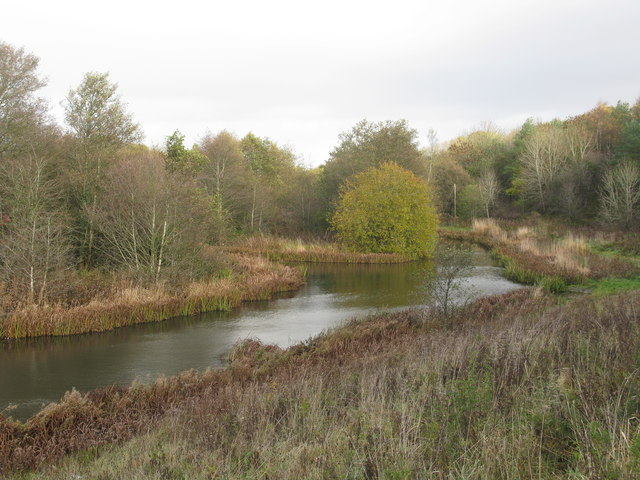
The Brock Burn flowing hrough the Darnley Mill Park

The park's eastern section, Darnley Mill Park, is formed by a glen through which the Brock Burn flows and was once the location of a lime works which processed stone from nearby quarries (all long since closed). On the other side of the park is Southpark Village, a neighbourhood of similar size and character to Parkhouse, but which adjoins a retail park including the first full-service supermarket in Scotland by the Sainsbury's company (opened 1992) as well as a large B&Q.

=== Transport ===
A major reason for the area's development into a car-friendly commuter suburb was the proximity of the M77 motorway between Glasgow and Ayrshire, Junction 3 of which is only 0.6 miles (1 km) from the junction of Parkhouse Road and Nitshill Road.

There are several rail links in close proximity to the area. Barrhead station provides services to East Renfrewshire and Ayrshire. For travel to Glasgow the nearest railway station for most residents is Nitshill, with Priesthill & Darnley on the same Glasgow South Western Line also fairly close.

The frequent '57' bus service operated by First Glasgow passes along Nitshill Road, providing access to Glasgow City Centre in one direction and the Silverburn Shopping Centre in the other; McGill's Bus Services operate an hourly service between Neilston and East Kilbride via Parkhouse Road.

== See also ==
- Darnley Lime Works Tramway and Mineral Railway
- Parkhouse, Glasgow G22
- Noddy housing
