= John Meikle =

Scottish soldier (1898–1918)

- Sergeant John Meikle
- Born: 11 September 1898; Kirkintilloch, East Dunbartonshire
- Died: 20 July 1918 (aged 19); Near Marfaux, France
- Burial place: Marfaux British Cemetery
- Military career
- Allegiance: United Kingdom
- Branch: British Army
- Rank: Sergeant
- Unit: The Seaforth Highlanders
- Conflicts: World War I †
- Awards: Victoria Cross; Military Medal

John Meikle VC MM (11 September 1898 – 20 July 1918) was a Scottish recipient of the Victoria Cross, the highest and most prestigious award for valour in the face of the enemy that can be awarded to British and Commonwealth forces.

== Life ==
Born in Kirkintilloch, Dunbartonshire, Meikle's family later moved to Nitshill, on the south side of Glasgow. Here, after leaving school, he worked as a clerk at the ticket office of Nitshill railway station.

In February 1915 he enlisted in the Seaforth Highlanders, joining the regiment's 4th Battalion in France in July 1916. He was serving as a lance-corporal at the Third Battle of Ypres when he won the Military Medal for bravery on 20 September 1917 at the Battle of the Menin Road Ridge.

=== VC action ===
Meikle was a 19 year old sergeant in the 4th Battalion, Seaforth Highlanders, British Army during the First World War when the following deed took place on 20 July 1918 near Marfaux, France, during the Second Battle of the Marne for which he was awarded the VC.

For most conspicuous bravery and initiative when his company, having been held up by machine-gun fire, he rushed single-handed a machine-gun nest. He emptied his revolver into the crews of the two guns and put the remainder out of action with a heavy stick. Then, standing up, he waved his comrades on. Very shortly afterwards another hostile machine gun checked progress, and threatened also the success of the company on the right. Most of his platoon having become casualties, Sgt. Meikle seized the rifle and bayonet of a fallen comrade, and again rushed forward against the gun crew, but was killed almost on the gun position. His bravery allowed two other men who followed him to put this gun out of action. This gallant non-commissioned officer's valour, devotion to duty, and utter disregard for his personal safety was an inspiring example to all.

Meikle is buried at Marfaux British Cemetery, maintained by the Commonwealth War Graves Commission, in the Marne department of France.

== Memorial ==
A memorial to John Meikle stands outside Dingwall railway station. The inscription reads: "In memory of Sergt John Meikle V.C M.M late clerk at Nitshill Station who enlisted in H.M. Forces (Seaforth Highlanders) 8th February 1915 during the Great War and was killed in action on 20th July 1918. Erected by his railway comrades".

The memorial was originally erected at Nitshill railway station in 1920, where, over the decades, it suffered vandalism. It was then moved to Levern Primary School in Nitshill, the local school Meikle had attended, and was on display in the school entrance for many years. When the school was to be demolished in 1997 the Head Teacher, Margaret Gallagher, contacted the Railway Authorities to enable the memorial to be saved for posterity. It now stands outside Dingwall station, while a new memorial, funded by the Railway Heritage Trust, was unveiled at Nitshill Station on 18 October 2016.

Meikle's medals, including the Victoria Cross, are displayed at Dingwall Museum in Ross-Shire.

== Bibliography ==
- Ross, Graham (1995). Scotland's Forgotten Valour. MacLean Press. ISBN 978-1899272006.
- Gliddon, Gerald (2013) [2004]. Spring Offensive 1918. VCs of the First World War. The History Press. ISBN 978-0-7524-8730-4.
