= South Nitshill =

Area of Glasgow, Scotland

Coordinates: 55.809286°N 4.360761°W

South Nitshill: Scottish Gaelic: Cnoc nan Cnòthan a Deas; Scots: Sooth Nitshull
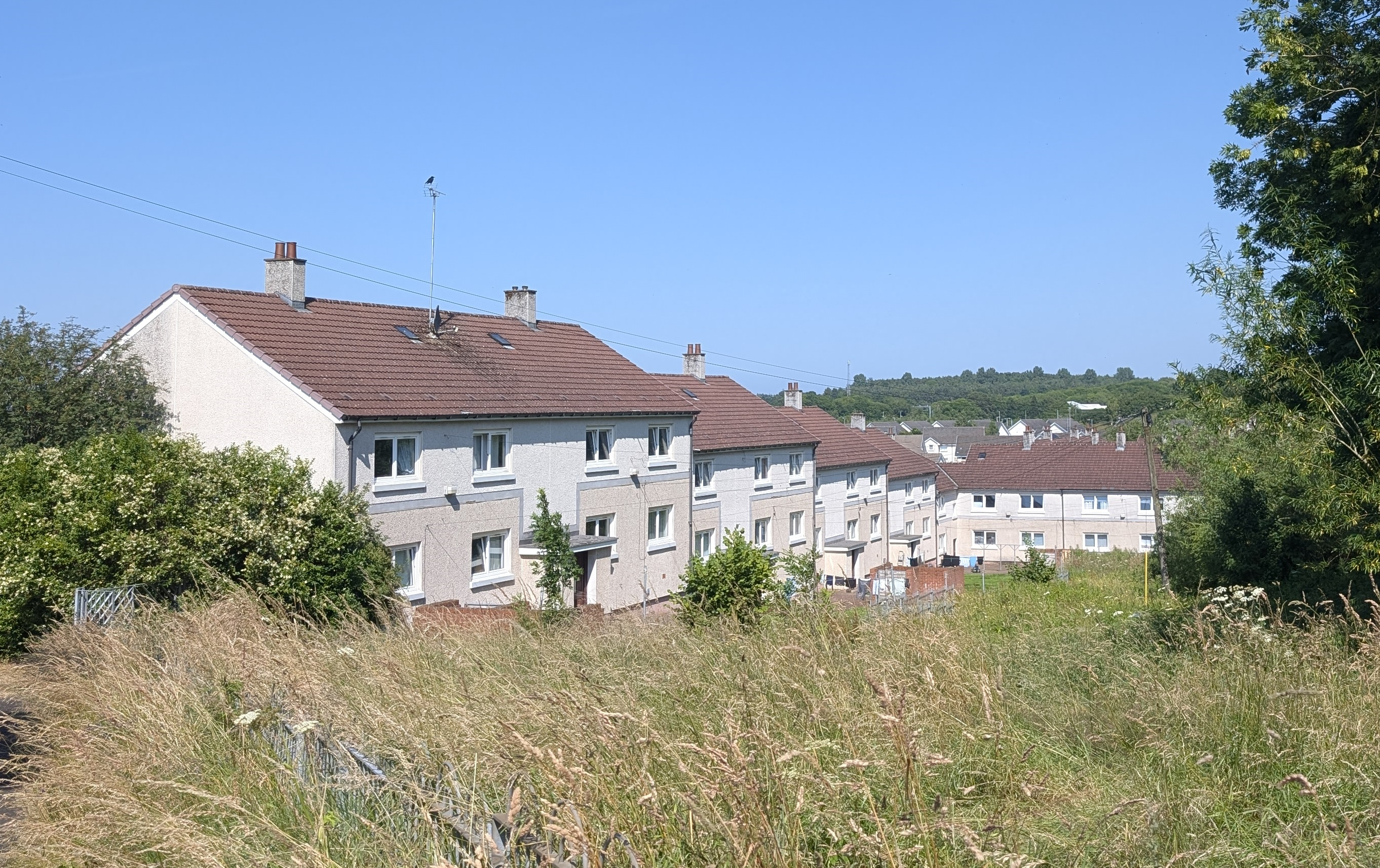
- Flats on Willowford Road

- Location within Glasgow
- OS grid reference: NS523599
- Council area: Glasgow City Council
- Lieutenancy area: Glasgow
- Country: Scotland
- Sovereign state: United Kingdom
- Post town: Glasgow
- Postcode district: G53 7
- Dialling code: 0141
- Police: Scotland
- Fire: Scottish
- Ambulance: Scottish
- UK Parliament: Glasgow South West
- Scottish Parliament: Glasgow Pollok

South Nitshill (Scottish Gaelic: Cnoc nan Cnòthan a Deas) is a neighbourhood in the Scottish city of Glasgow. It is situated south of the River Clyde, in the south-west of the conurbation and within the Greater Pollok ward of the local authority area. All streets in the area have names beginning with 'W'.

It is bordered on three sides by other residential areas within Glasgow: to the south by Parkhouse and Southpark Village, to the north-east by Darnley and to the north (across a railway line) by Nitshill, an older settlement which was also developed for housing in the late 1950s. To the west are fields and the Levern Water separating the city from the town of Barrhead in East Renfrewshire. The closest railway station is Nitshill.

== History ==
The original housing scheme (the Crescent, Whitacres, Woodfoot and the Valley) has now largely been demolished. Only the Valley area remains, and it was refurbished in the early 21st century. The demolished areas have now been replaced with private housing (60 of them flats) mainly built by Persimmon Homes. Other builders are across the road in the Parkhouse area (known to locals who lived in South Nitshill in the 1970s and 1980s as "The Wimpeys").

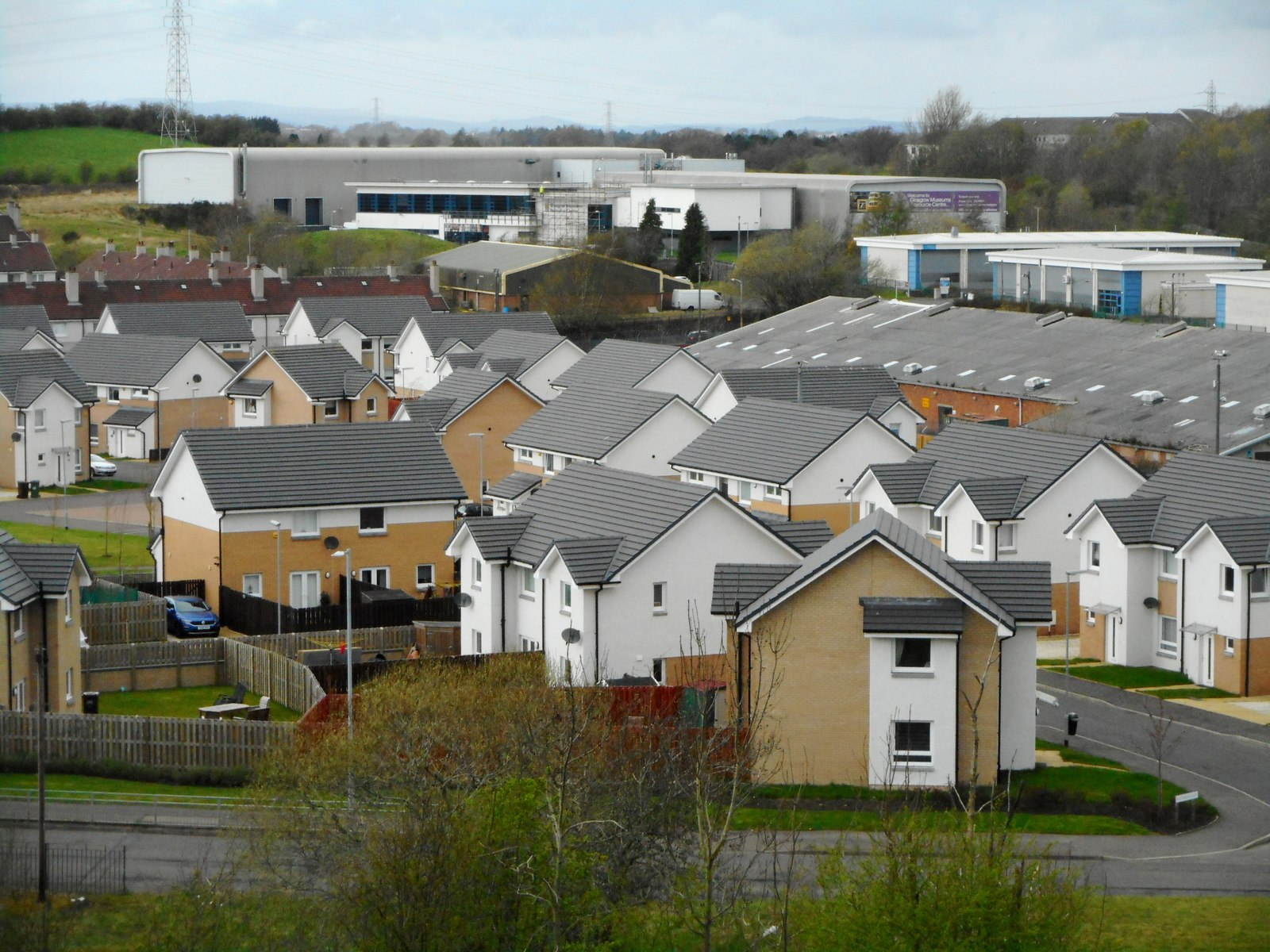
New housing, Wiltonburn Place (2018)

Although the scheme was, from 1960 onwards, plagued with social problems like many others in the city, a strong community spirit remained, something which long-term residents have stated is somewhat lacking in the modern version. Facilities are poor - Nitshill Primary School and Woodacre Nursery closed under Glasgow City Council's 'Pre 12 strategy', and not a single shop exists in the area. This has led to criticism from locals given the number of houses following redevelopment, yet no amenities to support them. In its 1970s and 1980s heyday, South Nitshill had a dozen shops, two churches (St Bernard's and a little-known Church of Scotland Church which closed in the early 1980s), a bus terminus and "Jean's" three ice-cream vans.

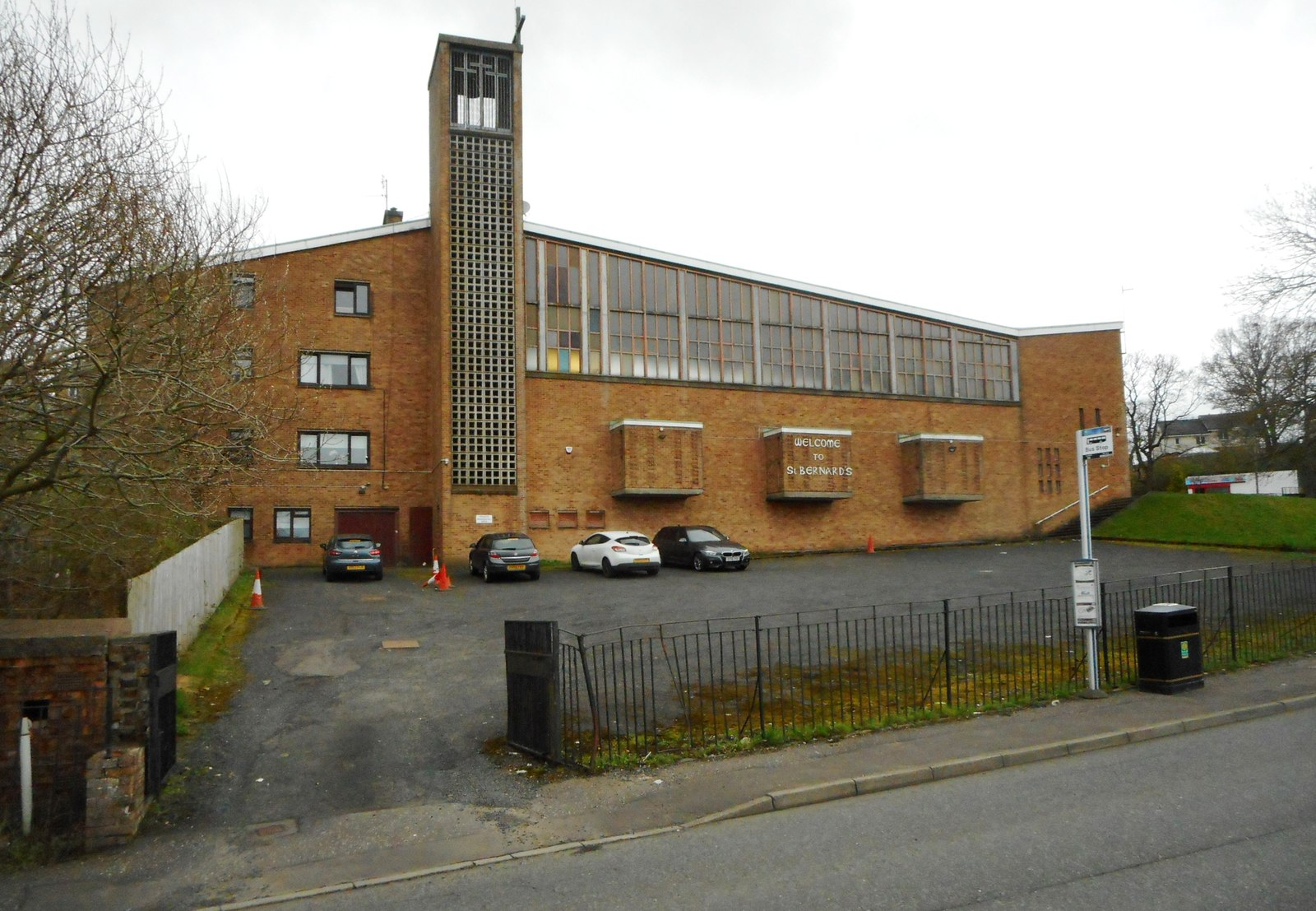
St Bernard's Church

The only vestiges of the old scheme that now remain are the large St Bernard's Catholic Church (designed by Glasgow architect Thomas Cordiner and opened in December 1963) and the Sky Dragon take-away shop (est 1989), both on Wiltonburn Road. This parish and family-run business still survives despite the destruction of all around.

The Glasgow Museums Resource Centre (a facility open to the public for free which is a store of the many objects not on display at the city's main museums) is located at the north side of South Nitshill. This is adjacent to a small industrial estate, with a larger industrial area, 'Darnley Trading Estate', a short distance to the east. In the vicinity, there is also a retail park and the M77 motorway (Junction 3 of which serves the area).
