= Roughmussel =

Coordinates: 55.82230°N 4.36172°W

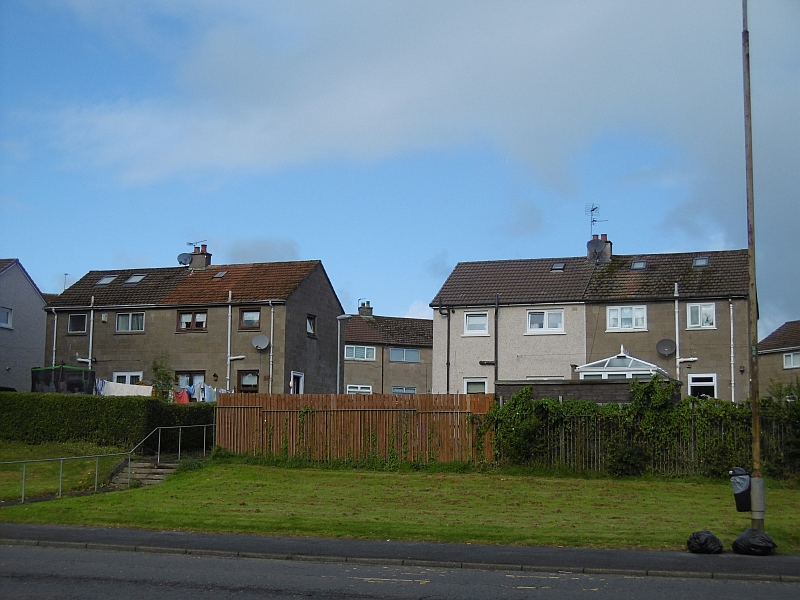
- Houses on Kinarvie Road

- Location within Glasgow
- OS grid reference: NS518612
- Council area: Glasgow City Council
- Lieutenancy area: Glasgow
- Country: Scotland
- Sovereign state: United Kingdom
- Post town: GLASGOW
- Postcode district: G53
- Dialling code: 0141
- Police: Scotland
- Fire: Scottish
- Ambulance: Scottish
- UK Parliament: Glasgow South West
- Scottish Parliament: Glasgow Pollok

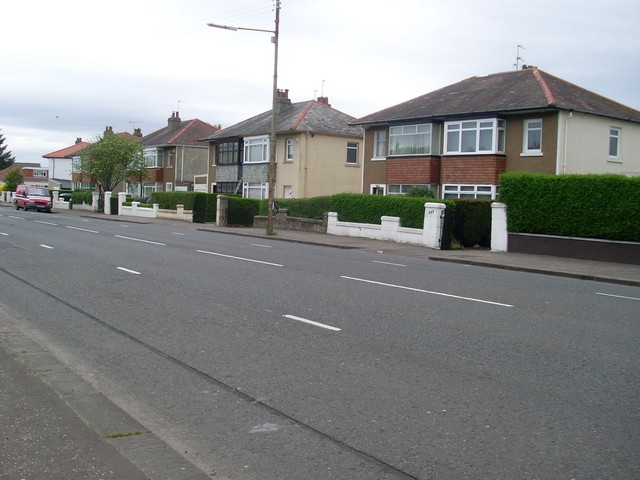
Crookston Road

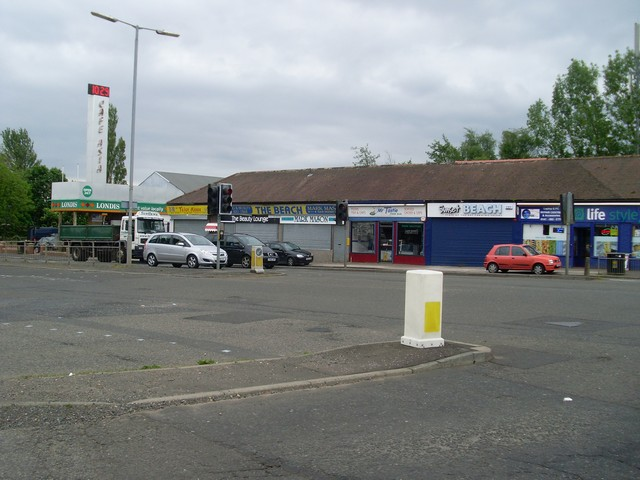
Shops on Barrhead Road

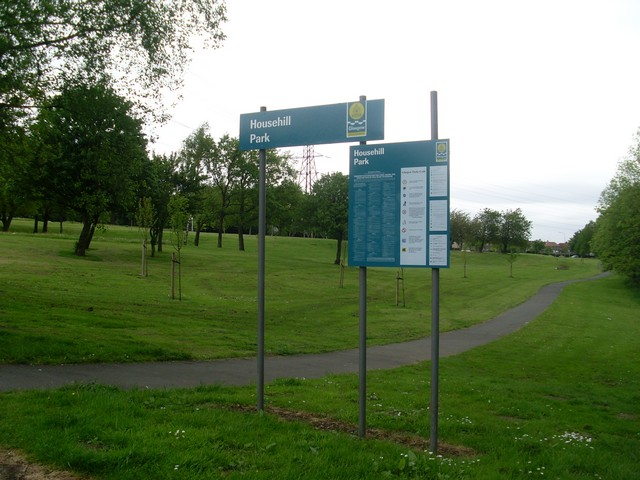
Househill Park

Roughmussel is a neighbourhood in the Scottish city of Glasgow. It is situated south of the River Clyde near to the city boundaries with East Renfrewshire to the south and Renfrewshire to the west. The area was originally part of Renfrewshire until being subsumed by Glasgow in the 1920s.

Roughmussel was built on the lands of the former Roughmussel Farm, which covered around 40 acres. The farmhouse was constructed around 1870 to replace the original building that stood on the opposite side of Barrhead Road (approximately where the electricity substation is now). The farm was notably mentioned in the General Review of the Agriculture of Renfrew, where it was described using the Scots term 'paffle', meaning a small piece of land, croft, or allotment. It also appears on Thomas Richardson's 1795 map of the area as 'Rochmusch'.

The area developed as a small isolated council estate off Crookston Road, with around 200 local authority houses built in the 1950s which replaced two original rows of cottages. The estate later extended towards Pollok with a few streets of private homes in the 1970s. Since the expansion of Crookston southwards along the main road to meet Roughmussel in the early 21st century, the area is often regarded as part of Crookston.

Barrhead Road, the other main thoroughfare in the area, features a row of local shops. Househill Park and the Hurlet is to the south and south-west, through which the Levern Water flows. The land to the west of Roughmussel towards Paisley remains open green belt countryside and woodland. A residential park with a children's play area lies to the north-west adjoining housing at Raeswood built in the 2010s.
