= Out-of-town shopping centres in the United Kingdom =

In the United Kingdom, an out-of-town shopping centre is an enclosed shopping centre located outside of a town centre. The impact of out-of-town shopping centres in the United Kingdom is studied in the context of urban planning, town centre redevelopment, the retail industry and even public health and gender divides. Due to its significance for these issues, it has been included in the school exam curriculum in geography. There are only about sixteen out-of-town enclosed shopping centres (including outlet centres) in the United Kingdom (as opposed to open air retail parks, which do not count as shopping centres in British English, even though they do in American English). Under current policy, no more will be built. All other British shopping centres are in town and city centres.

In the 1960s and '70s, most town and city centres had seen the development of a major shopping precinct. Redditch, in Worcestershire, had the Kingfisher Shopping Centre; Birmingham had the Bull Ring Centre; Manchester, the Arndale Centre; Newcastle, the Eldon Square Shopping Centre and Leeds, the Merrion Centre.

Brent Cross, which opened in 1976, was the country's first out-of-town shopping centre. Construction of later out-of-town centres was facilitated by removal of regulations under the Thatcher government. In some cases such as Meadowhall in Sheffield (opened in 1990), they were built because of available land and labour due to the demise of the steel industry in the area. Similarly, the Metro Centre in Gateshead, Tyneside opened in the mid 1980s and was built on former swamp lands on the banks of the River Tyne. The Trafford Centre in Greater Manchester was built on greenfield land belonging to the Manchester Ship Canal Company. In the case of the White Rose Centre in Leeds, it was not due to industrial downfall that it was built, but high retail space prices in the city centre and available contaminated land, close to local motorways, of the right size, and unsuitable for house building. Had the Morley sewage works not come available it is unlikely such a centre would be in Leeds.

== England ==
=== London ===
- Brent Cross, Hendon, London

=== South East ===
- Bluewater, Greenhithe, Kent (serves London)
- Hempstead Valley Shopping Centre, Hempstead, Kent

=== North West ===
- Trafford Centre, Trafford, Greater Manchester

=== Yorkshire And The Humber ===
- Meadowhall, Sheffield, South Yorkshire
- White Rose Centre, Leeds, West Yorkshire
- Designer Outlet York, York, North Yorkshire

=== North East ===
- Metro Centre, Gateshead, Tyne and Wear

=== South West ===
- Cribbs Causeway, Patchway, South Gloucestershire (near Bristol)

=== West Midlands ===
- Merry Hill Shopping Centre — Developed during the 1980s mostly on land previously occupied by Round Oak Steelworks, it is often considered an out-of-town centre, one which drew the retail market away from Dudley. However, it is situated near the centre of the small town Brierley Hill, and there are actually plans for it to be integrated with the town centre in future developments.

=== East Of England ===
- Braintree Village (formerly Braintree Freeport), Braintree, Essex
- The Galleria, Hatfield, Hertfordshire
- Lakeside Shopping Centre, Thurrock, Essex (serves London)

== Scotland ==
- Braehead, Renfrewshire (near Glasgow)
- The Gyle Shopping Centre, Edinburgh
- Silverburn Shopping Centre, Pollok, Glasgow
