= Priesthill =

Coordinates: 55.815764°N 4.343219°W

Priesthill: Scottish Gaelic: Cnoc an t-Sagairt
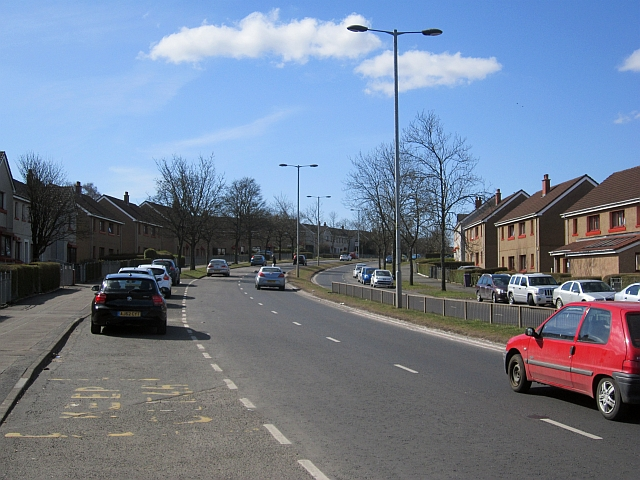
- Peat Road

- Location within Glasgow
- OS grid reference: NS531605
- Council area: Glasgow City Council
- Lieutenancy area: Glasgow
- Country: Scotland
- Sovereign state: United Kingdom
- Post town: Glasgow
- Postcode district: G53 6
- Dialling code: 0141
- Police: Scotland
- Fire: Scottish
- Ambulance: Scottish
- UK Parliament: Glasgow South West
- Scottish Parliament: Glasgow Cathcart and Pollok

Priesthill (Scottish Gaelic: Cnoc an t-Sagairt) is a neighbourhood in the south of the River Clyde in the Scottish city of Glasgow. It falls under the Greater Pollok ward of the city council area. The Darnley neighbourhood is located to the south, on the opposite side of the Glasgow South Western Line railway (both areas are served by Priesthill and Darnley railway station), while Nitshill lies to the west and Househillwood and the Silverburn Centre shopping complex to the north. The M77 motorway runs to the east of Priesthill with open farmland beyond.

== History ==
Priesthill was first mentioned in ancient text as a farm community owned by Walter Steward the progenitor of later Stuart kings and queens. Lord Darnley, husband of Mary, Queen of Scots, owned the land where Priesthill is located. During the Reformation, it is alleged a Catholic priest was hanged from a tree near Darnley Lane on the edge of the area, which is now called Priesthill to commemorate the occasion. More than likely the area was named after Priesthill Near Muirkirk, some twenty miles to the south over open country in Ayrshire. Others allege that Priesthill was named after an ancient church that stood at the top of the hill on Stewart land. However, there is no historical or viva voce testimony to validate the claim. It is also said that Mary and Darnley did their courting near Darnley Lane. An ancient tree still stands at the end of the Darnley lane, which is now adjacent to a main highway (A726).

Once part the parish of Eastwood in Renfrewshire, the area was encompassed within Glasgow at the same time as Pollokshaws in the 1910s. Priesthill was one of the earliest attempts made by the Glasgow local government to relocate families from the outdated central tenements of Gorbals, Pollokshaws and other districts. Several homeless families were housed there in or around 1948–1950.

St Robert Bellarmine Secondary and other public schools were built to educate the influx of new residents in the early 1950s. The hills beyond Priesthill were farmed until the 1960s and formed part of the Kennishead farm owned by Sir John Maxwell. This land was bought by Glasgow Corporation for housing purposes and the Darnley development was built there. Eastwoodmains, adjacent to Arden and Priesthill, was being farmed by the MacDonald family into the 1960s; this land was taken partially to make way for the new M77 motorway. The houses built by the local government in the 1950s were mostly condemned and levelled in the 2000s and the land used for a mixture of private and public housing developments. Others were refurbished in the 1980s, but required further substantial investment by the 2010s.

== Notable residents ==
- Limmy
