= Hurlet =

Coordinates: 55.81792°N 4.37119°W

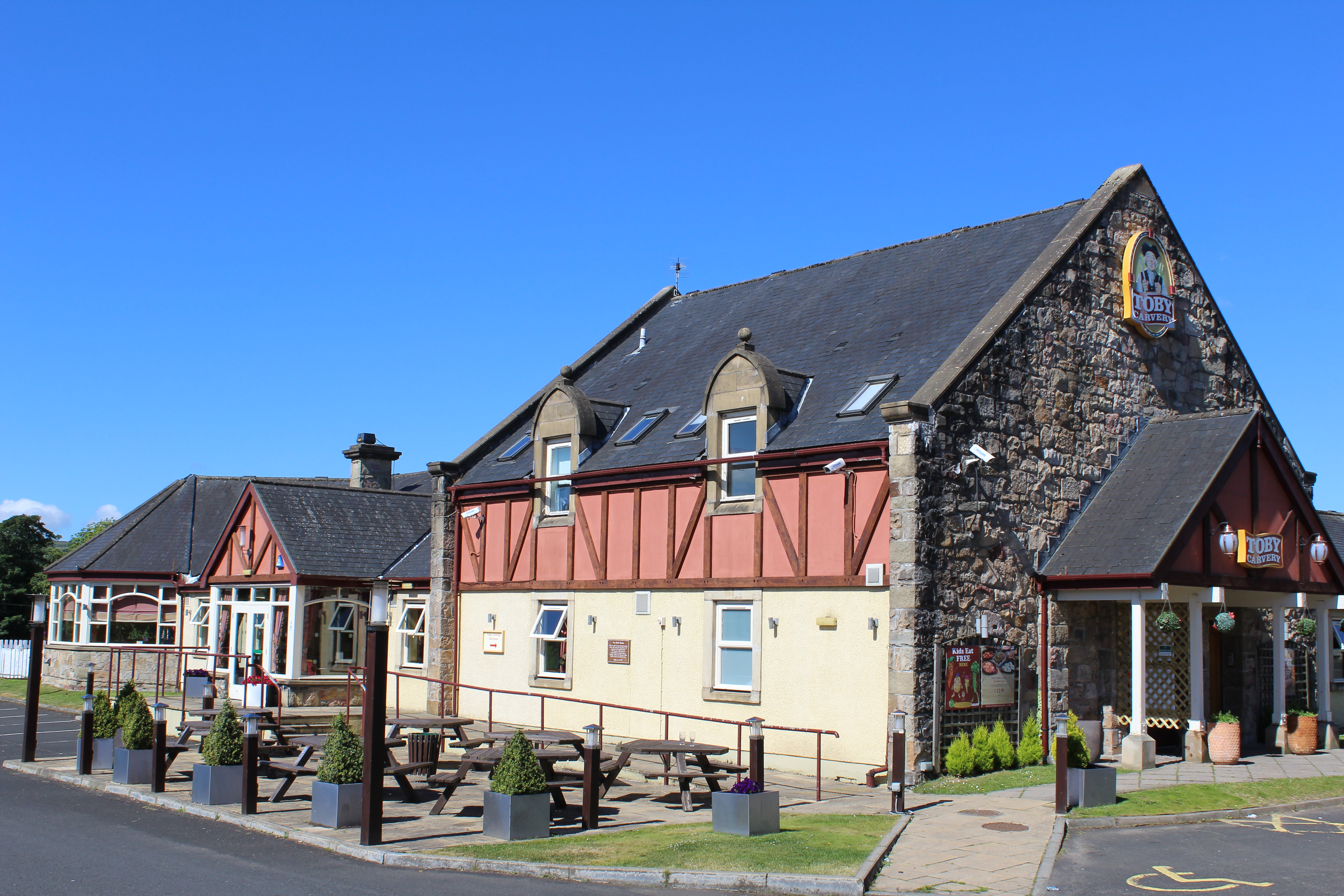
- The former Toby Carvery

- Location within East Renfrewshire
- OS grid reference: NS515296
- Council area: East Renfrewshire
- Lieutenancy area: Renfrewshire
- Country: Scotland
- Sovereign state: United Kingdom
- Post town: GLASGOW
- Postcode district: G53
- Dialling code: 0141
- Police: Scotland
- Fire: Scottish
- Ambulance: Scottish
- UK Parliament: East Renfrewshire
- Scottish Parliament: Renfrewshire South

Hurlet or The Hurlet is a former mining village in East Renfrewshire, Scotland. It is located around 2 miles (3 km) northeast of Barrhead, near the boundaries of the council areas with Glasgow to the north and Renfrewshire to the west.

== History ==
The Hurlet like the neighbouring area Nitshill was abundant with coal. The area developed due to early 19th-century industrial advances, supplying coal and building stone to Glasgow. However, large deposits of alum and copperas were also discovered. Both minerals are pivotable in the dyeing process in the textile industry, allowing the village to become significant in the county.

During the late twentieth century, most of the Hurlet was consigned to the history books when the A726 road, which cut through the village, was widened to become a dual carriageway.

== Notable people ==
Sir Isaac Holden, 1st Baronet, inventor.
