= Barrhead railway station =

Railway station of Barrhead, Greater Glasgow, Scotland

Barrhead Scottish Gaelic: Cnoc a' Bharra
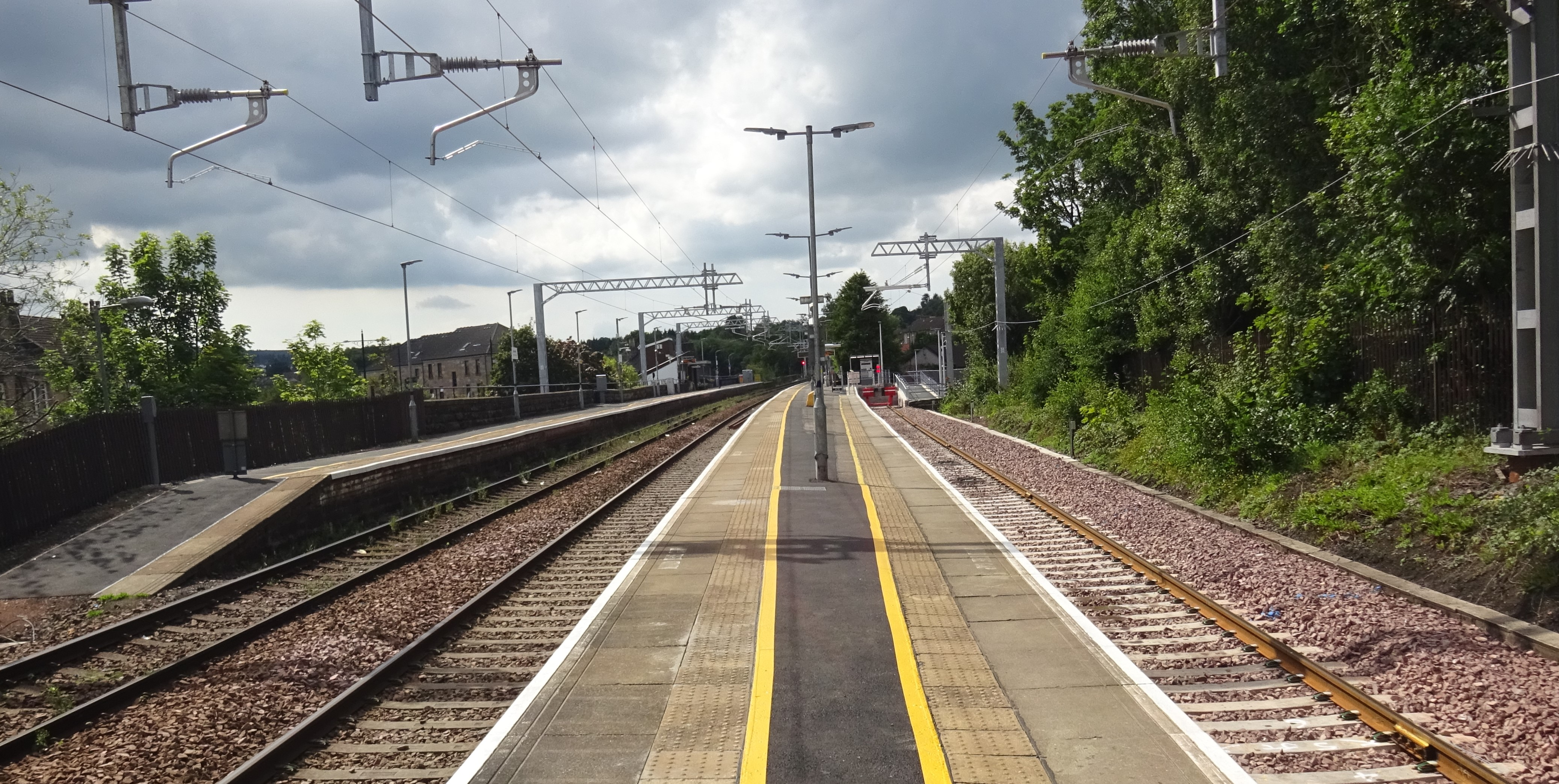
- View from Platforms 2 and 3 at Barrhead railway station, looking towards Kilmarnock

General information
- Location: Barrhead, East Renfrewshire; Scotland
- Coordinates: 55.8040°N 4.3971°W
- Grid reference: NS498593
- Manager: ScotRail
- Transit authority: SPT
- Platforms: 3

Other information
- Station code: BRR

History
- Original company: Glasgow, Barrhead and Neilston Direct Railway
- Pre-grouping: CR and G&SWR
- Post-grouping: LMS

Key dates
- 27 September 1848: Opened

Passengers
- 2020/21: ▼0.151 million
- 2021/22: ▲0.349 million
- 2022/23: ▲0.437 million
- 2023/24: ▲0.492 million
- 2024/25: ▲0.553 million
Location
Notes
- Passenger statistics from the Office of Rail and Road

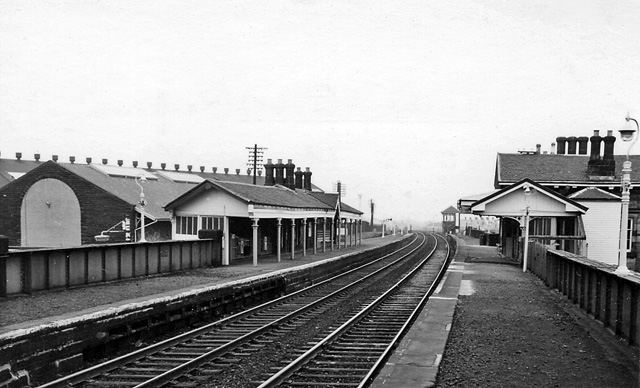
Barrhead station in 1970

Barrhead railway station is a railway station in the town of Barrhead, East Renfrewshire, Greater Glasgow, Scotland. The station is managed by ScotRail and is on the Glasgow South Western Line, 7 1/2 miles (12.1 km) southwest of Glasgow Central.

== History ==
The station was opened by the Glasgow, Barrhead and Neilston Direct Railway (GB&NDR) on 27 September 1848. The line southwards beyond Neilston (Low) to Kilmarnock via Dunlop (the Glasgow and Kilmarnock Joint Railway) was added between 1871 and 1873 by the Glasgow and South Western Railway and Caledonian Railway, giving travellers access to the G&SWR main line to Dumfries and Carlisle. The GB&NDR had originally been absorbed by the Caledonian Railway three years after completion, but was subsequently vested jointly into the CR and G&SWR by the Caledonian and Glasgow and South Western Railways (Kilmarnock Joint Line) Act 1869 (32 & 33 Vict. c. xcviii) in order to facilitate the extension southwards. Regular passenger services to the former G&SWR terminus at St Enoch ended with its closure in June 1966 – all services from here have henceforth used the former Caledonian station at Glasgow Central as their terminal.

The section south of here towards Kilmarnock was singled (with a loop at Lugton) in 1973 as an economy measure, following the completion of electrification work on the Carlisle to Glasgow Central section of the West Coast Main Line. The original G&SWR main line from Kilmarnock to Dalry was also closed to all traffic that year, leaving the line through here as the only available one for Kilmarnock to Glasgow trains. The section south of Lugton has since been partially redoubled, but Barrhead to Lugton remains single. This section is steeply graded in parts, with southbound services having to negotiate a climb of 3 1/2 miles (5.6 km) at 1 in 67-70 upon departure.

A new station building was officially opened on 27 September 1978 by the chairman of Strathclyde Region's Highways and Transportation Committee. Constructed at a cost of £113,000, the new station building was finished in brown facing brick, stained timber boarding, blue/black slates and tinted glazing.

An 1894 built signal box remained in operation to supervise the station area and control the single line stretch southwards. This was closed over the final weekend of October 2022 with the West of Scotland Signalling Centre taking control effective 31 October 2022.

December 2023 marked completion of a £63 million electrification project which allowed introduction of electric passenger services between Glasgow Central and Barrhead. Local Barrhead terminating services utilise Class 380 electric multiple units while Class 156 diesel multiple units continue to operate through the station on longer distance Kilmarnock, Dumfries and Carlisle services.

== Facilities ==
The station has three platforms - one north-east facing bay (on the north-west side) specifically for terminating services and two through platforms, 1 and 2, which can be used for any service. A ticket machine serves platforms 2 and 3 whilst there is a staffed ticket office at street level adjacent to platform 1 (staffed Monday - Saturday 06:50 - 19.50, Sunday 09:10 - 16:50). There are toilets and a pay phone on the concourse next to the ticket office. Train running information is offered via timetable posters, digital departure screens, automated announcements and help points. Level access is available to all platforms - via a lift to platform 1, a subway and ramps from the latter to platforms 2 and 3. On a Sunday once the ticket office closes, All trains in both directions use Platform 2, This is because the ticket office is required to access Platform 1 and if this is closed, The platform can't be used however if its closed during the week for e.g. a shortage of staff it will remain open.

The station car park offers eight spaces with a further 102 spaces provided in the adjacent local authority car park.

== Services ==
=== 2008/2009 ===
The station was generally served by a half-hourly service to and from Glasgow Central which stops at all intermediate stations. This was supplemented by a train heading to either Kilmarnock, Carlisle or Stranraer on an hourly basis, although a few train services did not stop.

=== 2010 ===
Following timetable change in December 2009, associated with the doubling of the line between Lugton and Stewarton, the station is generally served by a half-hourly service to and from Glasgow Central which stops at all intermediate stations. There is also a train to/from either Kilmarnock, Carlisle or Stranraer roughly every half-hour. Again, a few train services run non-stop through the station.

=== 2017 ===
The current service pattern is:

- 3tph to Glasgow Central, one of which starts in Kilmarnock, the other two start here.
- 2tph terminate here from Glasgow Central, calling at Crossmyloof, Pollokshaws West, Kennishead, Priesthill & Darnley and Nitshill
- 1tph to Kilmarnock (some continue to either Girvan or Stranraer)
- 6tpd to Carlisle, 3 of which are extended to Newcastle.

There is an hourly stopping service each way to Glasgow Central and Kilmarnock on Sundays. Two of the latter continue to Carlisle.

=== 2019-20 ===
The winter 2019 timetable remains broadly the same as before, but with Newcastle departures reduced to just one in late afternoon.

=== 2025 ===
On weekdays and Saturdays, there are three trains per hour northbound to Glasgow Central (one of which runs fast to Glasgow, while the other two call at all stations). Southbound, there are two trains per hour to Kilmarnock and approximately one every two hours extending through to Carlisle (two evening services terminate at Dumfries). One service in the morning continues from Kilmarnock to Ayr and a second in the evening to Girvan.

On Sundays, there is an hourly service to Glasgow calling at all stops (except Crossmyloof) and Kilmarnock (two of these continue to Carlisle). Services are operated by Class 156 DMUs and Class 380 EMUs.

Preceding station	National Rail	Following station
Dunlop	ScotRail; Glasgow South Western Line; Mondays-Saturdays only	Nitshill
	Historical railways	
Neilston Low; Line open; station closed	Caledonian and Glasgow & South Western Railways; Glasgow, Barrhead and Neilston Direct Railway	Nitshill
