= Priesthill & Darnley railway station =

Railway station in Glasgow, Scotland

Priesthill & Darnley Scottish Gaelic: Cnoc an t-Sagairt & Darnley [sic]
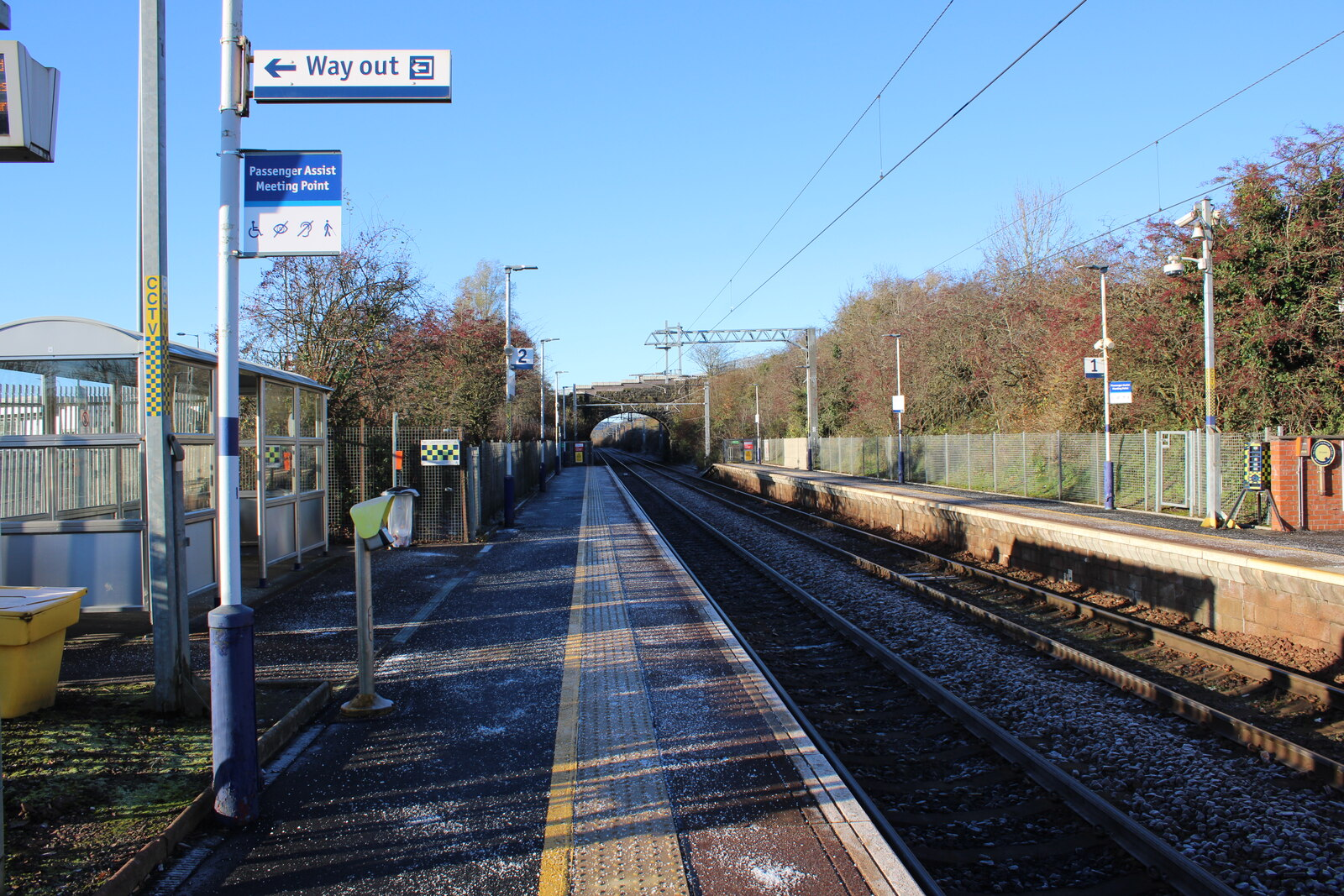
- Priesthill & Darnley station in 2025

General information
- Location: Priesthill and Darnley, Glasgow; Scotland
- Coordinates: 55.8120°N 4.3430°W
- Grid reference: NS532601
- Managed by: ScotRail
- Transit authority: SPT
- Platforms: 2

Other information
- Station code: PTL

Key dates
- 23 April 1990: Opened

Passengers
- 2020/21: ▼36,450
- 2021/22: ▲0.100 million
- 2022/23: ▲0.124 million
- 2023/24: ▲0.136 million
- 2024/25: ▲0.167 million
Location
Notes
- Passenger statistics from the Office of Rail and Road

Priesthill & Darnley railway station is a railway station serving the Priesthill and Darnley districts of Glasgow, Scotland. The station is managed by ScotRail and is on the Glasgow South Western Line.

== History ==
Opened by British Rail under the ScotRail sector on 23 April 1990.

== Facilities ==
The station is unstaffed and previously had no ticketing provisions however, in 2018, ticket machines were installed. There are waiting shelters on each platform and train running information is provided via CIS displays, automated announcement and help points on each side. Level access is only possible to platform 1, as platform 2 access requires the use of a steep ramp.

== Services ==
There is a half-hourly service in each direction (hourly in the evening) to Glasgow and Barrhead. Passengers for stations to Kilmarnock and beyond have to change at Barrhead, as most longer distance trains do not usually call here. However, there is one service to Carlisle which calls here on Sundays only.

From 21 May 2017 there is an hourly Sunday service between Glasgow Central and Kilmarnock that calls.

Preceding station	National Rail	Following station
Nitshill	ScotRail; Glasgow South Western Line	Kennishead
