= Levern Water =

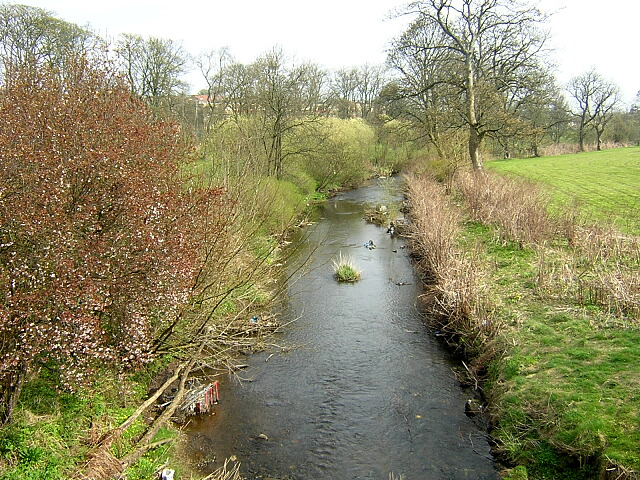
- Levern Water pictured near Househillwood
- Native name: Uisge Labharain (Scottish Gaelic)

Location
- Country: Scotland
- State: United Kingdom
- Council areas: East Renfrewshire, Glasgow
- City: Glasgow

Physical characteristics
- Source: Long Loch
  - location: East Renfrewshire, Scotland
  - coordinates: 55°44′35.3″N 4°25′33.2″W
- Mouth: White Cart River
  - location: Glasgow, Scotland
  - coordinates: 55°49′35.3″N 4°20′44.1″W

The Levern Water (Scottish Gaelic: Uisge Labharain) is a small river in East Renfrewshire and Glasgow, Scotland. It rises in the Long Loch and flows generally north and east, past the towns of Neilston and Barrhead, for a total distance of 9 miles (14 km). It empties into the White Cart River.

The Levern Water facilitated the socio-economic growth of parts of East Renfrewshire by providing water power for cotton mills and homes.

== Course ==
The source of Levern Water is Long Loch in East Renfrewshire, from which it emerges at the north-eastern tip, at coordinates 55.74313°N 4.42588°W. It flows from there northwest for a short distance before entering a 41-hectare (100-acre) reservoir formed by the four sections of the Harelaw Dam. The dam was built in 1844 and is used for trout fishing. The river continues west to the smaller Commore Dam reservoir, from which it emerges due north, gradually turning towards the northeast. It flows past Neilston on the west and north of the town, continuing east to Barrhead. After leaving Barrhead, the river runs north-east, forming the boundary between East Renfrewshire and the city of Glasgow, and crossing the Glasgow South Western Line at the Levern Water viaduct before fully entering Glasgow close to Nitshill, where it also crosses the A726 dual-carriageway. It continues into the suburb of Pollok and joins the White Cart River near Crookston Castle, which was where Mary, Queen of Scots, fled following the Battle of Langside in 1568.

== Viaduct ==
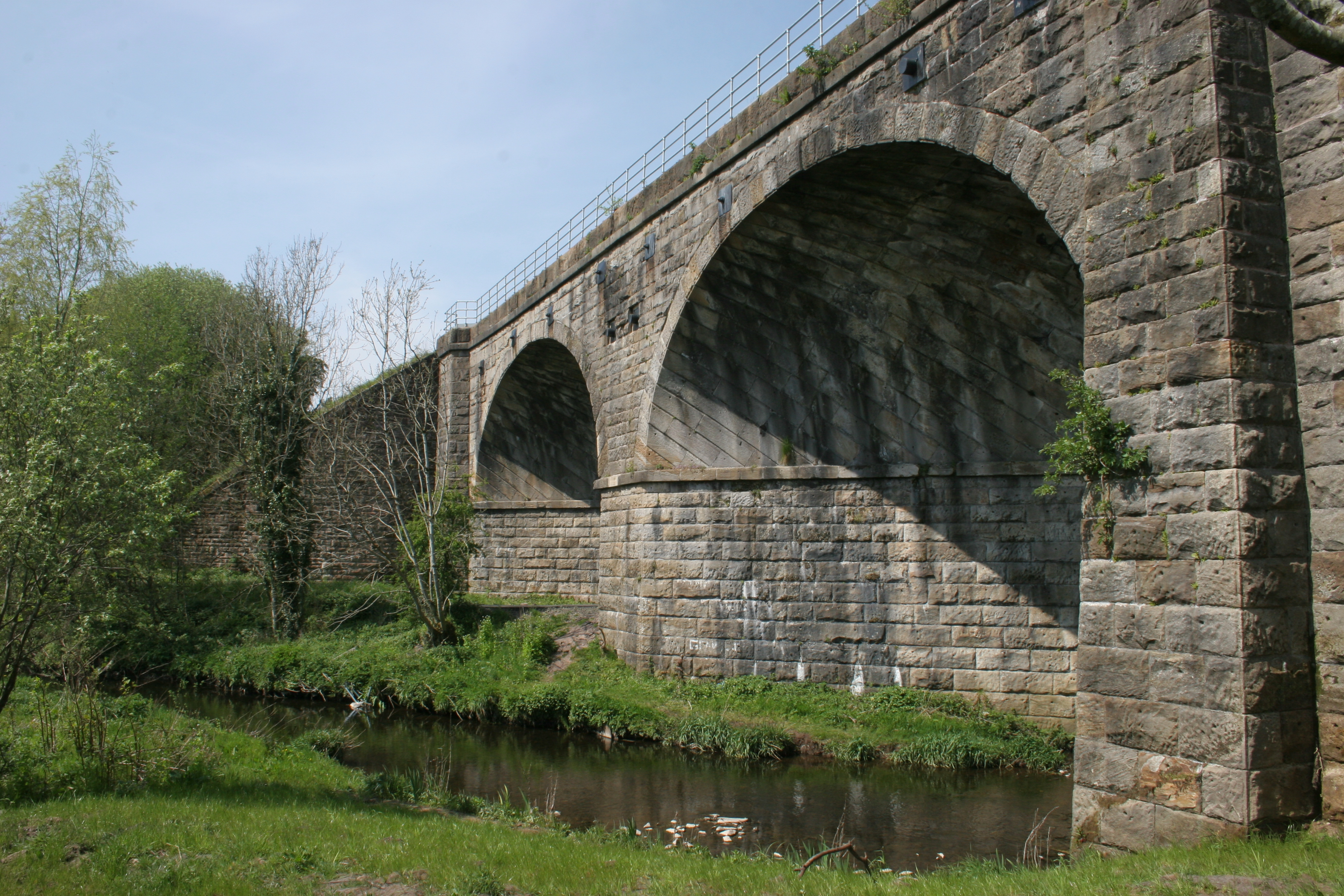
The Levern Water viaduct

In 1847, the Glasgow, Barrhead and Neilston Direct Railway built a three-arch viaduct across the river, designed by engineer Neil Robson of Glasgow. The viaduct was constructed using rusticated ashlar blocks. The viaduct has been listed as a Category B site since 17 February 1992. The viaduct also passes over the top of the minor Salterland Road, which has its own Category-C–listed bridge over Levern Water featuring two arches adjacent to the rail viaduct and built in the 18th century.

== See also ==
- List of rivers of Scotland
