= Darnley =

Coordinates: 55.808943°N 4.340692°W

Darnley: Scots: Dernly
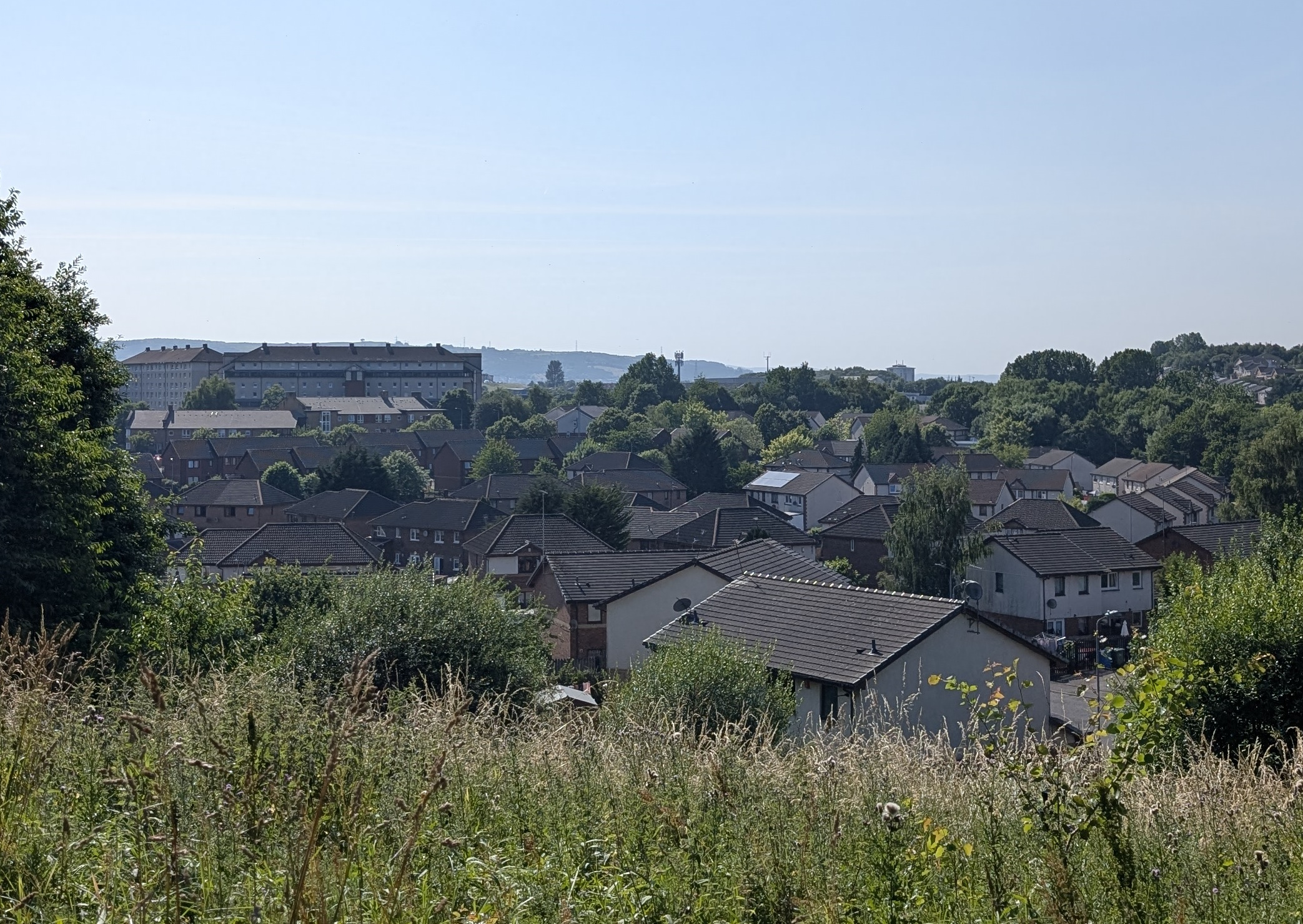
- Darnley seen from the east

- Location within Glasgow
- OS grid reference: NS534597
- Council area: Glasgow City Council
- Lieutenancy area: Glasgow
- Country: Scotland
- Sovereign state: United Kingdom
- Post town: GLASGOW
- Postcode district: G53 7
- Dialling code: 0141
- Police: Scotland
- Fire: Scottish
- Ambulance: Scottish
- UK Parliament: Glasgow South West
- Scottish Parliament: Glasgow Pollok

Darnley is an area in south-west Glasgow, Scotland, on the A727 just west of Arden (the areas are separated by the M77 motorway although a footbridge connects them). Other nearby neighbourhoods are Priesthill to the north, Southpark Village to the south, and South Nitshill and Parkhouse to the west; there is also a small industrial estate. The closest railway station is Priesthill and Darnley. The Brock Burn flows through the area.

== History ==
The historic estate of Darnley (anciently Derneley, etc.), in Eastwood parish, Renfrewshire, 1 1/2 miles (2.5 kilometres) east of Barrhead, was the seat of an ancient barony. In 1356, Robert Stewart, High Steward of Scotland, granted the barony to Sir John Stewart. It remained a possession of this branch of the house of Stewart (known as "Stewart of Darnley"), and in 1460 Sir John Stewart of Darnley (d. 1495) became "Lord Darnley" (a Scottish Lordship of Parliament) and subsequently in 1488 he was created Earl of Lennox (2nd creation).

His descendant in the fourth generation was Henry Stewart, Lord Darnley (1546–67), the second but eldest surviving son of Matthew Stewart, 4th Earl of Lennox, (the courtesy title "Lord Darnley", his father's subsidiary title, designating him as heir apparent to the Earldom of Lennox), and the husband of Mary Queen of Scots by whom he was the father of King James VI of Scotland, I of England.

The title Earl of Darnley has been created twice. The 1675 creation was as a subsidiary title for Charles Lennox, 1st Duke of Richmond, 1st Duke of Lennox (1672–1723), of Goodwood House in Sussex, an illegitimate son of King Charles II, who in the early 18th century sold the estate of Darnley to the Duke of Montrose. It was sold again in 1757 to Sir John Maxwell of Pollok, and in 1884 belonged to Stirling-Maxwell of Pollok and Keir, at which time it gave a prefix name to several seats of manufacture and other localities within its limits. Nothing remains of Darnley Castle, the seat of the Stewarts of Darnley, except possibly a round stair tower, now incorporated into a later building.

During the second half of the 20th century, Darnley experienced total transformation from being a modest semi-rural community to becoming a significant part of Glasgow's response to a post-war housing shortage. Following the construction of large housing schemes at South Nitshill (1957) and Kennishead (1966), the City of Glasgow approved the building of 2,048 homes in Darnley in 1968. This scheme was to occupy an area to the north of Nitshill Road covered by Leggatston Farm, part of the original Darnley estate taken within the City of Glasgow boundaries in 1938.

Over three phases a total of 1,336 deck-access apartments, in blocks ranging in height from between two and seven stories and with inter-linking pedestrian access corridors, were built. This fell short of the initial number planned owing to a combination of economic, political and management setbacks. It was intended that Darnley would be a largely self-supporting estate and for this reason, two primary schools and a community centre formed part of the council's plans. A social club and bowling green, a church, a small shopping centre and a library were all added throughout the 1970s. Most of the original 1970s deck-access housing, which by the late 1990s had become dilapidated and increasingly abandoned, was demolished and replaced by a smaller quantity of modest individual houses with the remaining blocks refurbished. The present housing stock is managed by Glen Oaks Housing Association which was founded in 1991 and later expanded its scope to include regeneration projects in nearby Arden and Pollok as well as more recent developments at Southpark and Regents Park (north of Carnwadric).

The broadening of the A726 to dual carriageway status in 1983 heralded the development of the Nitshill corridor as a light industrial and retail location. Darnley Trading Estate and large retail outlets are clustered around Junction 3 of the southward extension of the M77 motorway (completed in 1997). The closure of Darnley Hospital in 1992 and the opening on the site of a £3 million 120-bed nursing home in 1993 also altered the employment opportunities for the local population and has become symptomatic of the regeneration of modern Darnley. However, there is a huge retail area with large chain stores, including a Sainsbury's supermarket (the first in Scotland, dating from 1992).

== The Darnley plane tree ==
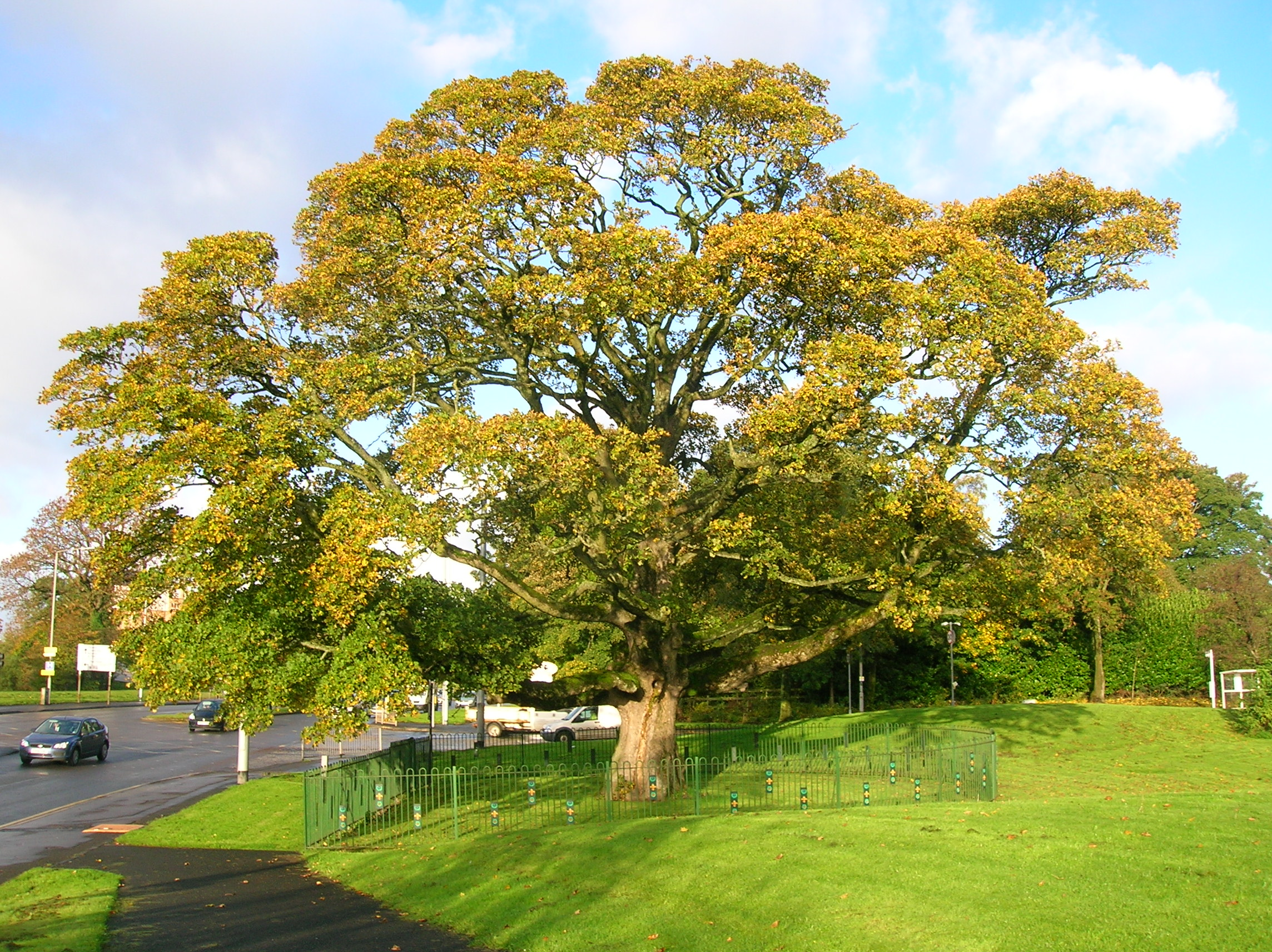
Mary Queen of Scots is said to have nursed her sick husband, Henry Stewart, Lord Darnley, under this "plane tree" (actually acer pseudoplatanus, sycamore tree); it must therefore have been mature in the 1560s as Darnley died in 1567

Mary, Queen of Scots came to Glasgow early in 1567, having left Holyrood Palace in Edinburgh on 24 January to collect her husband, Lord Darnley. Darnley had reportedly contracted smallpox and the Queen intended to bring him back to Holyrood on a litter as he was too weak to ride a horse. Darnley returned with his wife, only to be murdered a few days later on 10 February.

The tree was severely damaged by Storm Éowyn in January 2025.

== Recent development ==
A £20 million refit and extension programme of Sainsburys began in February 2010; work included raising the store from 44,000sqft to 89,000sqft, constructing a mezzanine floor at the Nitshill Road side, a new petrol station and double-deck car parking area.

The new petrol station opened on 20 August 2010, the first in the company to have green-energy solutions such as solar energy panels and rain-water recycling for its car wash. The store was opened on 29 September 2010, by all 17 of the long-term employees who had been there since its initial opening in 1992.

== See also ==
- Darnley Lime Works Tramway and Mineral Railway
- Dams to Darnley Country Park
- Stewart of Darnley
