= Nitshill railway station =

Railway station in Glasgow, Scotland

Nitshill
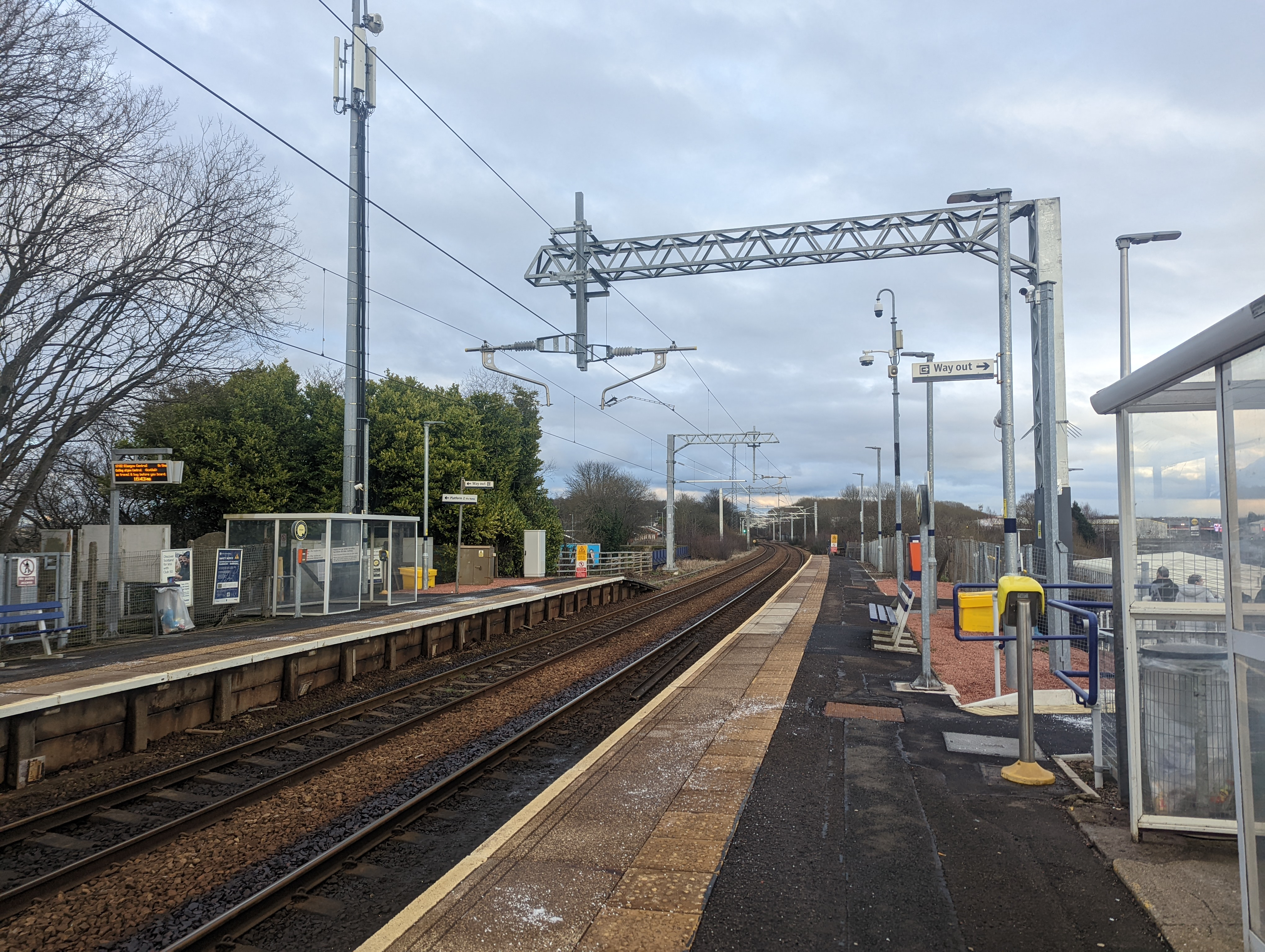

General information
- Location: Nitshill, Glasgow; Scotland
- Coordinates: 55.8119°N 4.3603°W
- Grid reference: NS521601
- Manager: ScotRail
- Transit authority: SPT
- Platforms: 2

Other information
- Station code: NIT

History
- Original company: Glasgow, Barrhead and Neilston Direct Railway
- Pre-grouping: G&SWR & CR
- Post-grouping: LMS

Key dates
- 27 September 1848: Opened

Passengers
- 2020/21: ▼26,336
- 2021/22: ▲72,366
- 2022/23: ▲96,712
- 2023/24: ▲0.110 million
- 2024/25: ▲0.131 million
Location
Notes
- Passenger statistics from the Office of Rail and Road

Nitshill railway station is situated in Nitshill, a district of Glasgow, Scotland. The station is managed by ScotRail and is on the Glasgow South Western Line, 5 3/4 miles (9.3 km) southwest of Glasgow Central.

== History ==
The station was opened by the Glasgow, Barrhead and Neilston Direct Railway on 27 September 1848.

Between 1957 and 1958 the station was targeted by a set of four separate deliberate fires. Following the initial blaze on 6 May 1957 which destroyed the booking office, waiting rooms and parcels office,subsequent arson attacks destroyed a temporary booking office, records store and permanent way hut. A 14-year-old boy admitted to all of the offences at the Juvenile Sheriff Court and was sent to an approved school.

In 2023, the footbridge was replaced with a ramp to allow step-free access.

== Facilities ==
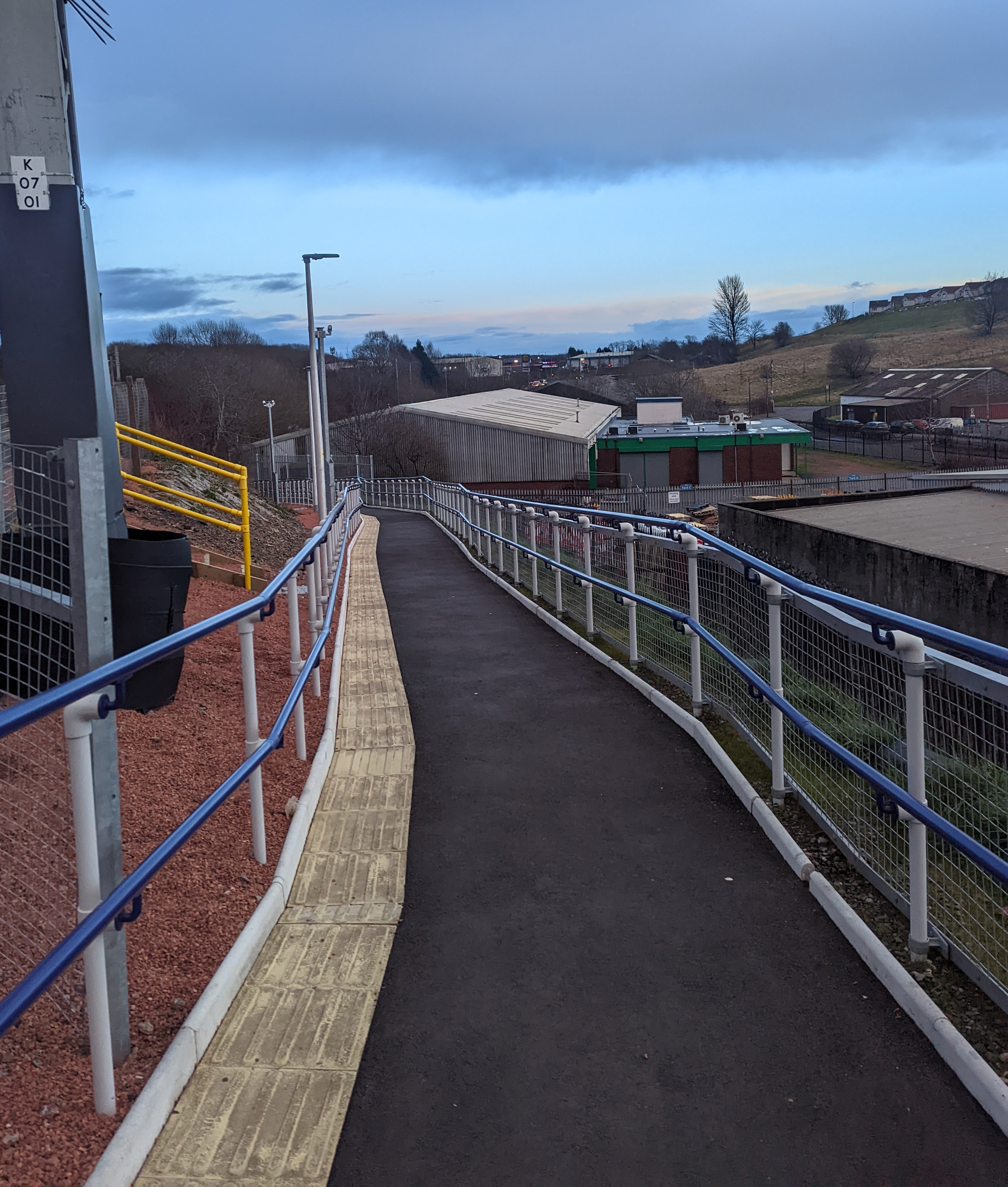
The ramp leading to Platform 2

The station is unstaffed and has no ticketing provision, so all tickets must be bought prior to travel or on the train. There are no permanent buildings here other than standard waiting shelters on each platform. Train running information is offered via digital display screens, timetable posters and automated announcements; a help point is also provided on each side. Step-free access is possible to both platforms.

== Services ==
Monday to Saturday daytimes there is a half-hourly service northbound to Glasgow Central and southbound to Barrhead. This drops to hourly in the evenings with southbound services extending to Kilmarnock with one extending to Dumfries.

From 21 May 2017 there is an hourly Sunday service to Glasgow Central and to Kilmarnock. Additionally, there is one afternoon service to Carlisle on Sundays.

Preceding station	National Rail	Following station
Barrhead	ScotRail; Glasgow South Western Line	Priesthill & Darnley
	Historical railways	
Barrhead	Caledonian and Glasgow & South Western Railways; Glasgow, Barrhead and Kilmarnock Joint Railway	Kennishead
