= Silverburn Shopping Centre =

Out-of-town shopping centre in Scotland

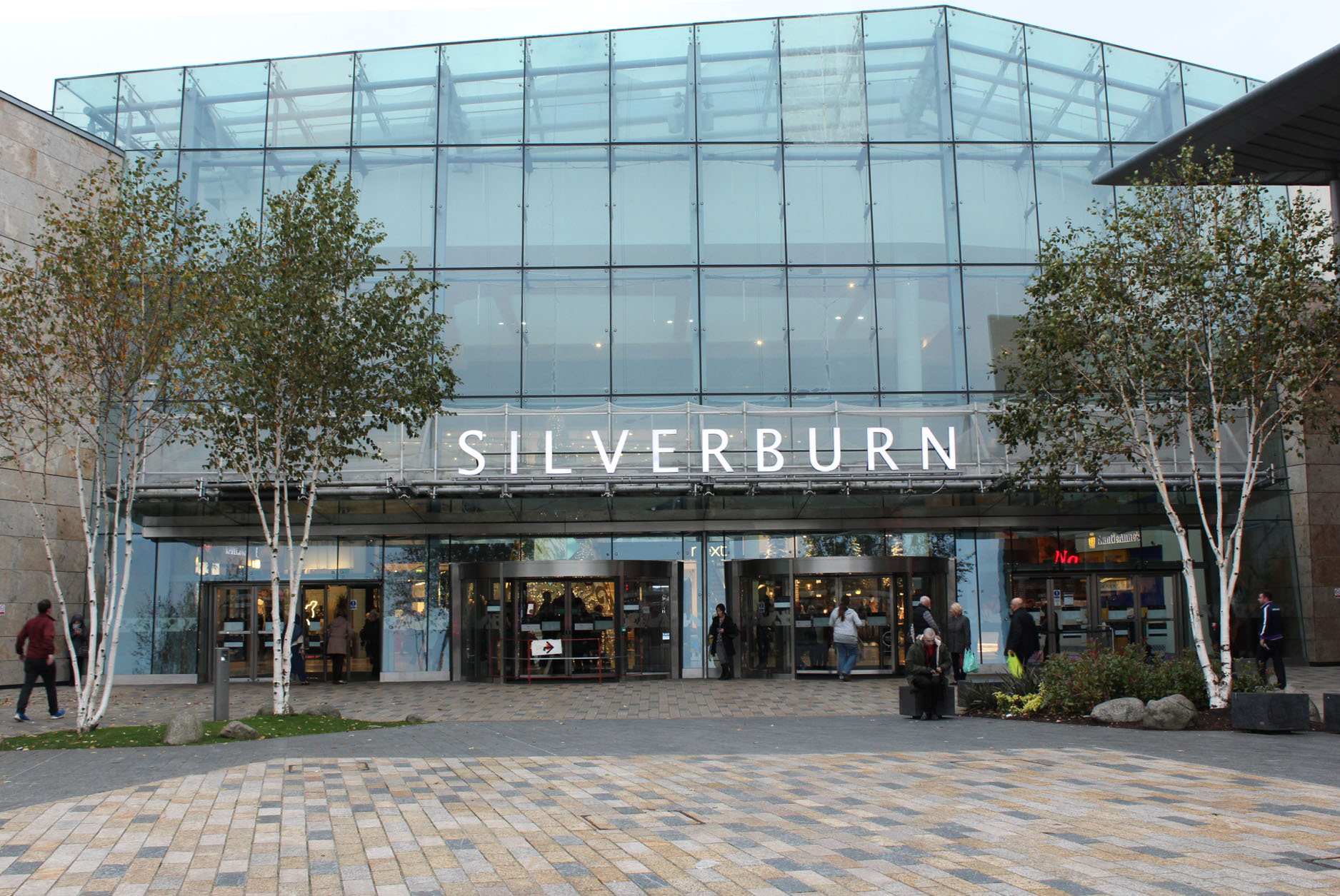
- One of the main entrances in 2015
- Location: Pollok, Glasgow, Scotland
- Coordinates: 55.822°N 4.339°W
- Opened: 25 October 2007
- Developer: Retail Property Holding Ltd
- Num. of stores: 130
- Num. of anchor tenants: 4
- Floor area: 1,500,000 sq ft (140,000 m^{2})
- Floors: Single Floored Mall. Certain Stores are two storey.
- Parking: 4,000 approx
- Website: shopsilverburn.com

Silverburn Shopping Centre, commonly known as Silverburn, is an out-of-town shopping centre located on Barrhead Road in Pollok, Glasgow, Scotland, which opened on 25 October 2007. As of July 2026, it has 130 stories, including Zara, JD Sports, Molton Brown, The White Company, H&M, Kurt Geiger, Pandora and Hugo Boss. Ranked as the 23rd largest shopping centre by area in the United Kingdom, it replaced the 75-acre (30-hectare) Pollok Centre with a brand new 1,500,000-square-foot (140,000-square-metre) shopping centre, anchored by Tesco, Next, Marks & Spencer and previously Debenhams before it closed in 2021.

== History ==
Built on land that was previously the Pollok Centre dating from the late 1970s, which itself replaced an unsuccessful development of tenement housing from the 1940s, the completed Silverburn opened for the first time on Thursday 25 October 2007, designed by BDP (architects), Stuart McTaggart (civil and structural engineers), Henderson Warnock (MEP & Utility Consultants) and constructed by Bovis Lend Lease.

The largest Scottish Tesco Extra had opened on 10 July 2006 at the site, replacing the Tesco store in the old Pollok Centre. It was the first naturally ventilated shopping mall in Scotland using a combination of wind catchers and underfloor heating to maintain comfort for shoppers. Threebrand, the agency working on the project’s brand strategy, stated that the name derives from its setting in nature; associations with water from the adjacent Brock Burn and Pollok – which itself means pond or pool – and a 'silver appearance' of reflected light from the angled roofs (architects BDP had designed the building as to not follow any straight lines) combining to form Silverburn.

Developed by Retail Property Holdings Ltd (RPH) to house 95 shopping units and 14 restaurants and cafes, it is one of the largest shopping centres in the UK. It includes one million square feet (90,000 square metres) of retail and leisure space, 2000 parking spaces in a multi-storey car park, and 2500 spaces on the ground. In 2009, the centre was sold to Hammerson for £300 million.

== Accolades ==
It was named the "UK's best shopping centre" in 2019, the latest of several awards since its opening.

== Operation ==
=== Expansion ===
In 2013, a programme of expansion began, to include a Cineworld cinema and nine new restaurants. This was completed in stages between late 2014 and mid-2015 and now employs 1500 people. After a proposal in 2014 to extend the centre over its current car parking area, further plans for expansion were proposed in October 2015, with the intention to expand over the other side of the M77 with further shopping and leisure features, a hotel, and a community centre.

=== Overview ===
Silverburn is Glasgow's fifth out-of-town shopping centre. Being located right next to the M77 motorway it is easily accessible to people coming from Paisley or East Renfrewshire. In September 2025, Silverburn Shopping Centre had an estimated 3,500 staff working across the centre including store staff and centre maintenance staff. The same month, Silverburn had 130 stores operating across the centre, with a non–domestic rates value of £7 million per year. By 2025, an estimated 16 million people visited Silverburn Shopping Centre a year. The centre is home to the largest Zara store in Scotland which serves as one of the companies flagship stores.

=== Mascot ===
A Silverburn mascot, a fox named Silvia, was introduced in 2018 following a competition between local primary school children.
