= List of places in Glasgow =

Map of places in Glasgow compiled from this list
See the list of places in Scotland for places in other counties.

== Selected districts of Glasgow ==
	District	Population	Area (km^{2})	Density (/km^{2})
1	Govanhill	9,725	0.86	11,308
2	Pollokshields	9,738	1.59	6,125
3	Partick	8,884	0.85	10,452
4	Hillhead	6,275	0.96	6,536
5	Govan	5,860	1.63	3,595
6	Gorbals	6,030	0.83	7,265
7	Shawlands	7,015	0.52	13,490
8	Langside	4,425	0.46	9,620
Σ	Total	57,952	7.7	7,526

== Areas by location to the River Clyde ==
The following are places within the Glasgow City council area.

Places north of the River Clyde Anderston, Anniesland, Auchenshuggle, Baillieston, Balornock, Barlanark, Barmulloch, Barrachnie, Barrowfield, Blackhill, Blairdardie, Blochairn, Botany, Braidfauld, Bridgeton, Broomhouse, Broomhill, Budhill, Cadder, Calton, Camlachie, Carmyle, Carntyne, Colston, Cowcaddens, Cowlairs, Craigend, Cranhill, Dalmarnock, Dennistoun, Dowanhill, Drumchapel, Easterhouse, Firhill, Gallowgate, Garnethill, Garrowhill, Garscadden, Garthamlock, Germiston, Gilshochill, Greenfield, Haghill, Hamiltonhill, High Possil, High Ruchill, Hillhead, Hogganfield, Hyndland, Jordanhill, Kelvinbridge, Kelvindale, Kelvingrove, Kelvinhaugh, Kelvinside, Knightswood, Lambhill, Lancefield, Lightburn, Lilybank, Maryhill, Maryhill Park, Merchant City, Millerston, Milton, Mount Vernon, Netherton, Newbank, North Kelvinside, Park District, Parkhead, Parkhouse G22, Partick, Partickhill, Port Dundas, Possilpark, Provanhall, Provanmill, Queenslie, Riddrie, Robroyston, Royston, Ruchazie, Ruchill, Sandyford, Sandyhills, Scotstoun, Scotstounhill, Shettleston, Sighthill, Springboig, Springburn, Springhill, Stobcross, Stobhill, Summerston, Swinton, Temple, Tollcross, Townhead, Wallacewell, Wellhouse, Whiteinch, Woodlands, Woodside, Yoker, Yorkhill.

Places South of the River Clyde Arden, Auldhouse, Battlefield, Bellahouston, Cardonald, Carmunnock, Carnwadric, Castlemilk, Cathcart, Cessnock, Corkerhill, Cowglen, Craigton, Croftfoot, Crookston, Crosshill, Crossmyloof, Darnley, Deaconsbank, Drumoyne, Dumbreck, Eastwood, Fairfield, Govan, Govanhill, Gorbals, Halfway, Hillington, Hillpark, Househillwood, Hutchesontown, Ibrox, Jenny Lind, Kennishead, King's Park, Kingston, Kinning Park, Langlands, Langshot, Langside, Laurieston, Linthouse, Mansewood, Mavisbank, Merrylee, Moorepark, Mosspark, Mount Florida, Muirend, Newlands, Nitshill, Oatlands, Parkhouse G53, Pollok, Pollokshaws, Pollokshields, Polmadie, Port Eglinton, Priesthill, Queen's Park, Rosshall, Roughmussel, Shawlands, Shieldhall, Simshill, South Nitshill, Southpark Village, Strathbungo, Summertown, Toryglen, Tradeston, Wearieston.

== See also ==
- Demographics of Glasgow
- List of places in Scotland
- Wards of Glasgow
