= Sandyhills =

Area of Glasgow, Scotland

Coordinates: 55°50′59″N 04°08′51″W

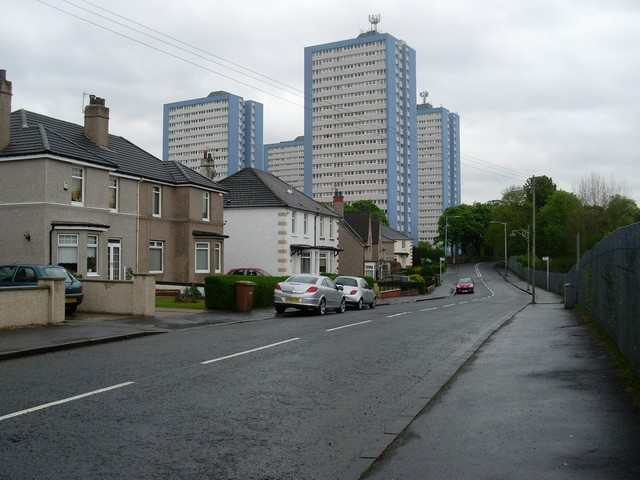
- Tower blocks and cottages in Sandyhills (2009)

- Location within Glasgow
- OS grid reference: NS656639
- Council area: Glasgow City Council
- Lieutenancy area: Glasgow
- Country: Scotland
- Sovereign state: United Kingdom
- Post town: GLASGOW
- Postcode district: G32
- Dialling code: 0141
- Police: Scotland
- Fire: Scottish
- Ambulance: Scottish
- UK Parliament: Glasgow East
- Scottish Parliament: Glasgow Shettleston

Sandyhills is an area of the Scottish city of Glasgow. It is situated north of the River Clyde and has fallen within the Shettleston ward of Glasgow City Council since 2007.

The area is bordered by Shettleston to the west, Barrachnie (part of Baillieston) to the east, Mount Vernon to the south-east and Tollcross to the south-west; it is separated from Springboig to the north-west and Barlanark to the north-east by the North Clyde Line railway. A golf course bearing the Sandyhills name forms much of the southern boundary. Most of the area's streets are named after towns and villages in Perthshire.

== History ==
The pattern of urban growth in the area has led to an irregular tract of land being referred as Sandyhills today. It was originally a small settlement beside the Tollcross Burn, on the road (now the A89) east from the village of Shettleston in Lanarkshire, and took its name from the extensive country estate of the same name located to the south; both features are clearly marked as Sandyhills on William Roy's Military Map of Scotland (1755).

The wider area became known for mining in the 19th century, with two pits in the immediate area (part of the Mount Vernon Colliery) sited where Blackford Road and Crownhall Place are today. The coal was exhausted by the turn of the 20th century, but Sandyhills survived on the periphery of Shettleston, where several other industries became established leading to its growth in size and importance. Among the oldest buildings in the area are a set of row cottages and the adjacent tenement block containing the 'Gables' public house, and a terrace of sandstone houses on the opposite side of the road.

Railways provided links in and out of the area for workers and industry, with Mount Vernon North the closest station between the 1880s and the 1950s. Sandyhills Church is located in this area, with the original premises dating from 1900 replaced in the mid 1980s. Shettleston was one of several outlying areas which became part of Glasgow in 1912; however the older part of Sandyhills remained in Lanarkshire (along with Mount Vernon, Baillieston, Springboig, Carmyle, Fullarton and Foxley) and would remain in the Bothwell constituency until all were absorbed by Glasgow in a reorganisation under the Local Government (Scotland) Act 1973.

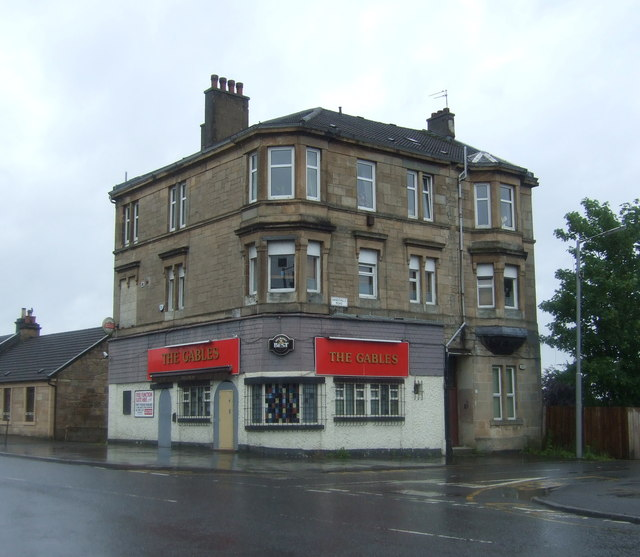
The Gables public house on Baillieston Road (2017)

The southern part of the Sandyhills House estate (which was part of the 1912 transfer to Glasgow) had been converted to a golf course in 1905, and in the early 1930s a housing scheme was constructed on the north-west part of the estate, essentially being a continuation of the contemporary and near-identical 'garden suburb' development south of Shettleston Road which extended to Ardgay Street at the Tollcross Burn. Centred around Amulree Street, this suburban area has changed little since it was built and is where Sandyhills Bowling Club (1930) and Sandyhills Post Office are located. These streets are separated from the Tollcross district to the south by a recreation and parkland area, previously a quarry and the Glasgow Corporation's factory producing foamslag - a housebuilding material derived from steelworks slag (demolished 1981). This park's grass football pitch, used by several local teams, was subjected to vandalism on several occasions in the 2010s.

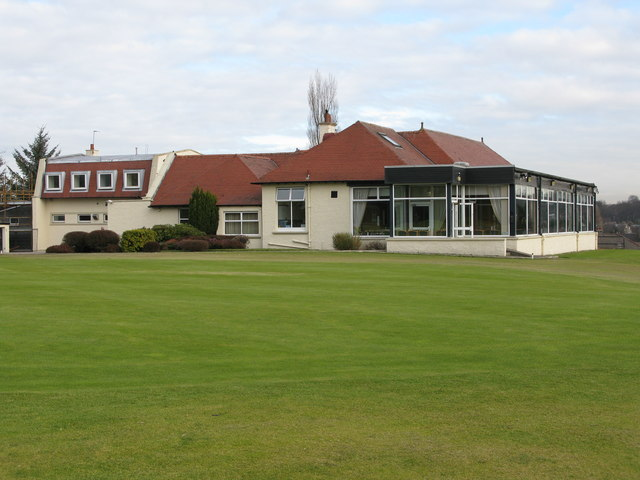
Sandyhills Golf Club, established in 1905

The city's need for new accommodation in less space accelerated after World War II, with the remainder of the Sandyhills House estate, including the mansion itself (dating from 1853), converted to housing using two vastly different approaches: 205 temporary and quickly-built prefab dwellings, and four 22-storey tower blocks containing 528 apartments, which upon their completion in 1968 became a landmark for the area. Since the demolition of the Derby Street flats at Hilltown, Dundee in 2013 and the Bluevale and Whitevale Towers and Red Road Flats in Glasgow two years later, the 69-metre-high (226-foot) Sandyhills blocks in Balbeggie Street and Strowan Street have held a distinction as the tallest inhabitable buildings in Scotland eastwards of those in Springburn (Martello Court in Edinburgh is 5 metres shorter).

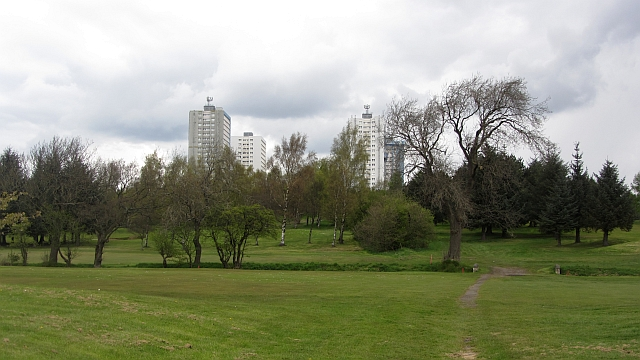
View from south over Sandyhills Golf Club and tower blocks mid-reclad (2012)

Nowadays managed by Glasgow Housing Association which oversaw a refurbishment and recladding in light blue in the late 2000s, soon followed by another reclad in white due to dampness problems which resulted, the towers far outlasted the prefabs which were replaced by a landscaped park at the base of the towers and some permanent houses closer to the older part of the neighbourhood on the main road.

From the late 1970s onward, much change happened to Sandyhills' low-rise housing stock as part of the wider GEAR (Glasgow Eastern Area Renewal) project. Both the Glasgow Corporation-managed housing and the SSHA estate (known locally as the "steel estate" - owing to the buildings being constructed using the Atholl steel system) were substantially refurbished. Properties were re-wired, re-plumbed and coal fires were replaced with gas central heating, and in the case of the steel estate - externally re-rendered. In 1990, the site of the former "prefabs" at the foot of the Sandyhills House tower blocks was redeveloped with brand new social housing - these were among the last properties to be planned by the SSHA prior to its dissolution into Scottish Homes.

The Lizzy Lodge was a pub situated between the tower blocks and the golf course in an isolated late 19th century sandstone villa; the business was earmarked for closure in the late 2000s due to the economic downturn, with the building destroyed entirely a few years later.

The construction of the 'Farmington' private housing development north of the main road (on the site of Sandyhills Farm, and the path of the old railway line to North Mount Vernon which had since been removed) in the late 1980s was the most recent major stage in the growth of the area. In 2012, the police beat covering Farmington had one of the lowest crime rates in Glasgow.

== Economy and transport ==
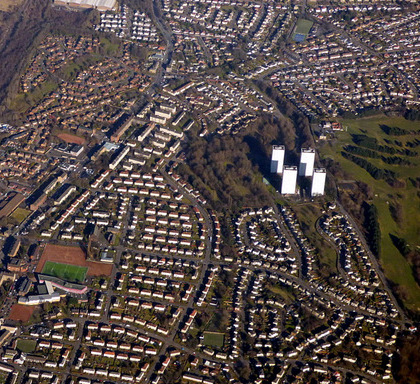
Aerial view of the area from the west, 2018

Although most local industry has long since ceased, there is still an industrial estate in the east of Shettleston (once a rope works), adjacent to a hypermarket (once an iron works specialising in machinery for the textile industry) which provide employment opportunities, along with many small businesses operating in that district and Tollcross; the largest building in the area by floor space is located towards Baillieston: a 18,000-square-metre (190,000 sq ft) storage and distribution facility, built on the site of an old chemical works which produced tar.

Sandyhills is also within commuting distance of central Glasgow via public transport - although the North Mount Vernon station and line have gone, there are four stations in different directions within a mile (Shettleston and Garrowhill on the North Clyde Line, and Carmyle and Mount Vernon on the Whifflet Line). Shettleston Road and Tollcross Road are both bus corridors with frequent services towards the city centre via Parkhead.

There are four schools in close proximity to Sandyhills: Wellshot Primary and St Paul's Primary to the south-west towards Tollcross Park, Eastmuir School (for children with special educational needs) to the north at Barlanark, and Eastbank Primary School on Shettleston Road, directly beside St Paul's RC Church (affiliated to the school of the same name). Wellshot, based in an imposing 1900s building that is something of a historic landmark in the area is a feeder for Eastbank Academy in Shettleston along with Eastbank Primary, while St Paul's is linked to St Andrew's Secondary.

== See also ==
- Glasgow tower blocks
