= A89 road =

Road in Scotland

A89

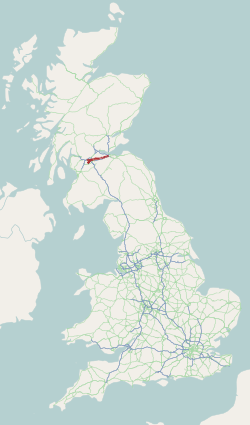

Route information
- Length: 35.6 mi (57.3 km)

Major junctions
- West end: A8 / A749 in Glasgow

- A8 near Swinton; M8 / M73 near Swinton
- East end: M8 / M9 / A8 in Newbridge

Location
- Country: United Kingdom

Road network
- Roads in the United Kingdom; Motorways; A and B road zones

The A89 is a trunk road in Scotland, United Kingdom. It runs from High Street, Glasgow to Newbridge in Edinburgh. It was once the A8, which has now been replaced, mostly by the M8.

== Route description ==
Within Glasgow, The Gallowgate, Shettleston Road, Baillieston Road, Glasgow Road and [Baillieston] Main Street have the A89 designation. As well as the aforementioned neighbourhoods bearing the road names, the A89 also passes through The Calton, northern Parkhead, Sandyhills and Garrowhill. Following major roadworks in the mid-2010s, the A89 now merges with the A8 Edinburgh Road (which has another meeting point at Glasgow Cross) for a short stretch near Swinton before a large roundabout leads the routes to split again, with the A8 feeding an interchange for the M8 and M73 motorways while the A89 passes under the M73 as Coatbridge Road, whereupon a further roundabout then reinstates the A8 as an alternative route along its old path, parallel to the new M8).

Leaving Glasgow, the A89 passes through Bargeddie, Coatbridge (meeting the start of the A725, effectively the south-eastern bypass of Glasgow), Airdrie (meeting the A73), Plains, Caldercruix, Blackridge, Armadale (meeting the A801 which connects the M8 and the M9), Bathgate, Boghall, Dechmont (meeting the A899 Livingston Interchange), Uphall, Broxburn before terminating at a roundabout in Newbridge which feeds Junction 1 of the M9. At this point, the road continues east as the A8 towards Edinburgh Airport, the A720 bypass then into the city itself.

== Junction list ==
Council area	Location	mi	km	Destinations	Notes
Glasgow	Glasgow	0.0	0.0	A8 (High Street / Saltmarket) / A749 south (London Road) / Trongate to M8 / M74 / A74 / M80 / A728 / A803 / A814 – City Centre, Govanhill, Glasgow Cross, Springburn, Carlisle, Rutherglen, Bridgeton	Western terminus; northern terminus of A749
Glasgow	Camlachie– Barrowfield boundary	1.4	2.3	A728 south (The Clyde Gateway) / Gallowgate to M74 / M77 – East Kilbride, Tollcross	East Kilbride signed eastbound only; northern terminus of A728
Glasgow	Swinton– Baillieston boundary	5.6	9.0	A8 west / Swinton Avenue to M8 – City Centre, Glasgow Airport, Greenock, Swinton, Easterhouse	Only route signed eastbound; western terminus of A8 concurrency
Glasgow		5.9	9.5	M8 / M73 to M74 – Edinburgh, Stirling, Carlisle, Glasgow (S); Rhindhouse Road – Swinton	M8 junction 8; M73 junction 2
North Lanarkshire	Bargeddie	6.6	10.6	A8 east (Glasgow and Edinburgh Road) to A752 – Coatbridge, Uddingston	To A752 and Uddingston signed westbound only; eastern terminus of A8 concurrency
North Lanarkshire	Bargeddie	6.9	11.1	A752 (Gartcosh Road) – Gartcosh, Muirhead, Uddingston	
North Lanarkshire	Coatbridge	9.3	15.0	A725 southwest (Coatbank Street) / B804 (Main Street) to A8 / M74 – East Kilbride, Edinburgh, Carlisle, Glenboig	Northeastern terminus of A725
North Lanarkshire	Airdrie	10.5	16.9	A8010 northeast (Aitchison Street) to A73 – Stirling, Cumbernauld	No access from A89 west to A8010; southwestern terminus of A8010
North Lanarkshire	Airdrie	11.9	19.2	A73 (Carlisle Road) – Cumbernauld, Motherwell	
West Lothian	Armadale– Bathgate boundary	23.9	38.5	A801 to M8 / M9 / A706 – Linlithgow, Falkirk, Livingston, Lanark, Whitburn	Livingston signed eastbound only, Whitburn westbound only
West Lothian	Bathgate	25.1	40.4	A800 northwest (Mill Road) / Menzies Road to A801 / B7002 – Linlithgow, Whitburn, Falkirk	To A801 and Falkirk signed eastbound only; southeastern terminus of A801
West Lothian	Bathgate	27.0	43.5	A779 / A7066 southwest / Pentland Avenue to M8 / A706 – Edinburgh, Glasgow, Livingston, Mid Calder, Whitburn, Armadale, Boghall	Northeastern terminus of A7066
West Lothian	Dechmont boundary	30.5	49.1	A899 / Business Park to M8 – Broxburn, Uphall, Livingston, Dechmont, Glasgow	Dechmont signed eastbound only, Glasgow westbound only
West Lothian	Broxburn	33.7	54.2	A899 south (East Main Street) – Broxburn, Uphall	Northern terminus of A899
Edinburgh	Newbridge– Ratho Station boundary	35.6	57.3	M8 / M9 / A8 / B7030 to A90 / A720 – Glasgow, Edinburgh, Forth Road Bridge, Stirling, Airport, Newbridge	Eastern terminus; M8 junction 2; M9 junction 1
1.000 mi = 1.609 km; 1.000 km = 0.621 mi: Concurrency terminus; Incomplete access
