= St Andrew's Secondary School, Glasgow =

St Andrew's Secondary School

Location
- 47 Torphin Crescent; Glasgow, G32 6QE; Scotland
- 55.8608°N 4.1689°W

Information
- Type: Comprehensive secondary school
- Motto: Putting Young People First or Fidus et Audax (Faithful and Courageous)
- Religious affiliation: Roman Catholic
- Local authority: Glasgow City Council
- Headmaster: Kevin Quinn
- Years offered: S1-S6
- Gender: Mixed
- Age range: 11–18
- Enrolment: 1766 (September 2018)
- Colours: Blue and Yellow
- Website: www.st-andrews-sec.glasgow.sch.uk

St Andrew's Secondary School is an 11–18 mixed-sex, Catholic comprehensive secondary school in Glasgow, Scotland. Its catchment area includes much of the East End of the city, including such districts as Baillieston, Craigend, Cranhill, Easterhouse, Greenfield, Shettleston, Tollcross and Wellhouse.

== Alumni ==
- Stephen Hendrie (born 1995), footballer (Hamilton Academical)
- David Marshall (born 1985), footballer (Celtic, Cardiff City, Hibernian F.C., Scotland national team)
- Brendan O'Hara (born 1963), politician (Scottish National Party, MP for Argyll & Bute / Argyll, Bute and South Lochaber)
