= Budhill =

Coordinates: 55.854581°N 4.159873°W

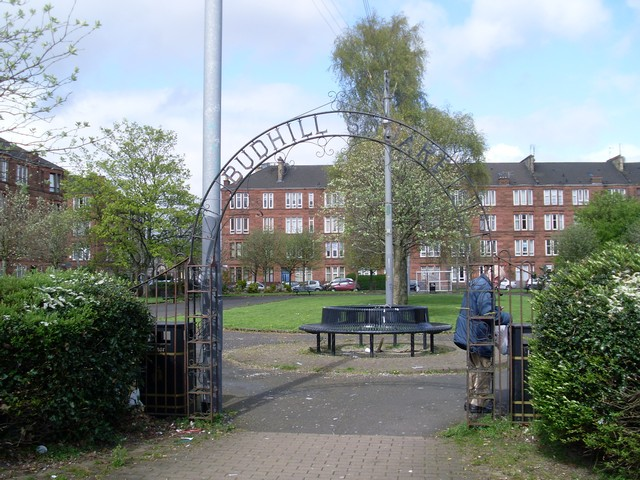
- Park area and tenements, Budhill Square

- Location within the Glasgow City council area Location within Scotland
- OS grid reference: NS648643
- Council area: Glasgow City
- Lieutenancy area: Glasgow
- Country: Scotland
- Sovereign state: United Kingdom
- Post town: GLASGOW
- Postcode district: G32 0
- Dialling code: 0141
- Police: Scotland
- Fire: Scottish
- Ambulance: Scottish
- UK Parliament: Glasgow East
- Scottish Parliament: Glasgow Shettleston

Budhill is a neighbourhood in the east end of Glasgow. It is situated north of the River Clyde. It is situated between Springboig to the north-east, Greenfield to the north-west and Shettleston to the south.

The area is associated with Scottish rock band The Fratellis, where the band used to play in a studio above a Chinese restaurant. The Fratellis also released a collection of songs from 2006 to the present day, called 'The Budhill Singles Club'. The name "Budhill" refers to the area of Glasgow where Barry was born. They also visit Budhill Square during the video for Creepin' Up the Backstairs.

Budhill Square is also the location of Shettleston railway station (managed by ScotRail). A large Tesco supermarket and Aldi serve this area on the Shettleston side of the railway. Budhill Park has a play area and a football pitch which is the home ground of women's amateur team Glasgow Girls F.C.
