= Glasgow City Council =

Scottish unitary authority council in Glasgow, Scotland

Glasgow City Council Comhairle Baile Ghlaschu
- Coat of arms

- Glasgow City Council logo

Type
- Type: Unitary authority

History
- Founded: 1 April 1996
- Preceded by: Glasgow Corporation (c. 1175–1975); City of Glasgow District Council (1975–1996)

Leadership
- Lord Provost: Jacqueline McLaren, SNP since 19 May 2022
- Leader: Ricky Bell, SNP since 10 September 2026
- Chief Executive: Susanne Millar since May 2024

Structure
- Seats: 85 councillors
- Graph of the party split among 85 seats.
- Political groups: Administration (37) SNP (37) Other parties (48) Labour (31) Green (8) Your Party (3) Reform (2) Conservative (1) Independent (3)
- Length of term: 5 years

Elections
- Voting system: Single transferable vote
- Last election: 5 May 2022
- Next election: 6 May 2027

Motto
- Let Glasgow Flourish

Meeting place
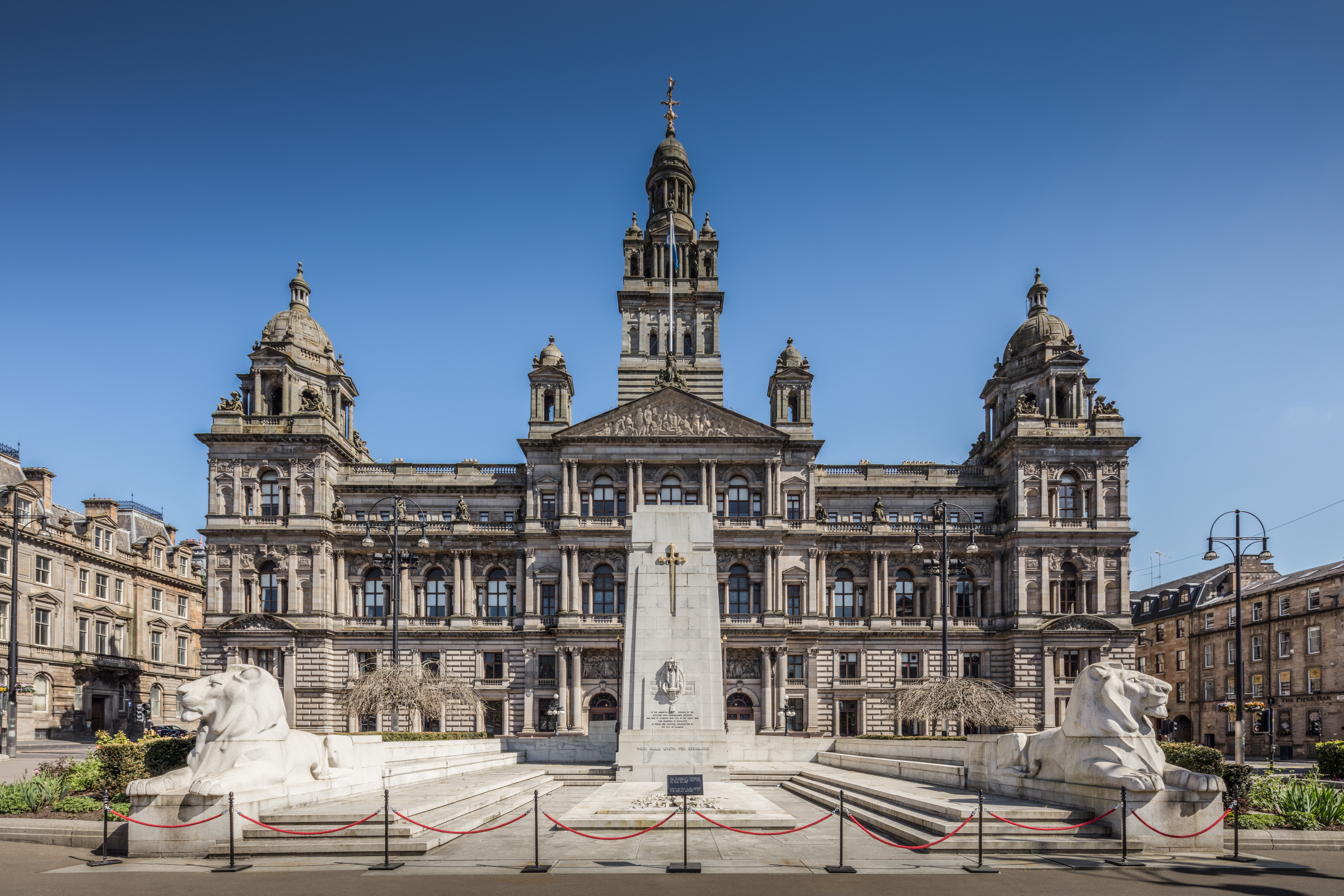
- City Chambers, George Square, Glasgow, G2 1DU

Website
- www.glasgow.gov.uk

Glasgow City Council (Scottish Gaelic: Comhairle Baile Ghlaschu) is the local authority for the Glasgow City council area, the most populous of the 32 council areas of Scotland. In its modern form it was created in 1996. Glasgow was formerly governed by a corporation, also known as the town council, from the granting of its first burgh charter in the 1170s until 1975. From 1975 until 1996 the city was governed by City of Glasgow District Council, a lower-tier authority within the Strathclyde region.

Glasgow City Council has been under no overall control since 2017, being led by a Scottish National Party minority administration. The council has its headquarters at Glasgow City Chambers in George Square, completed in 1889.

== History ==
=== Glasgow Corporation ===
Glasgow was given its first burgh charter sometime between 1175 and 1178 by William the Lion. It was then run by "Glasgow Town Council", also known as "Glasgow Corporation", until 1975. The city was part of Lanarkshire until 1893, but the functions which operated at county level were relatively few, largely being limited to lieutenancy and sheriffdom. When elected county councils were created in 1890 under the Local Government (Scotland) Act 1889, Glasgow Corporation was deemed capable of running its own affairs and so the city was excluded from the area controlled by Lanarkshire County Council, although the county council nevertheless chose to meet in Glasgow as a conveniently accessible location. In 1893, Glasgow became its own county for lieutenancy and judicial purposes too, being made a county of itself.

The boundaries of the burgh were extended several times where the urban area had outgrown the previous boundaries or where there were plans for development. Notable expansions included:

- 1830 – Blythswood
- 1846 – Anderston, Calton, and Gorbals
- 1891 – Crosshill, Govanhill, Pollokshields, Pollokshields East, Hillhead, and Maryhill
- 1905 – Kinning Park
- 1912 – Govan, Partick, and Pollokshaws
- 1926 – Cardonald, Crookston, Lambhill, Mansewood, Millerston, Nitshill, Scotstounhill, and Yoker
- 1938 – Castlemilk, Darnley, Drumchapel, and Easterhouse

=== City of Glasgow District Council ===
Local government across Scotland was reorganised in 1975 under the Local Government (Scotland) Act 1973, which replaced the counties and burghs with a two-tier structure of upper-tier regions and lower-tier districts. Glasgow became a district within the Strathclyde region. The local authority was therefore renamed the "City of Glasgow District Council". The Glasgow district covered a larger area than the pre-1975 city, gaining Baillieston, Cambuslang, Carmunnock, Carmyle, Garrowhill, Mount Vernon, Rutherglen, and Springboig.

=== Glasgow City Council ===
Local government was reorganised again in 1996 under the Local Government etc. (Scotland) Act 1994, which abolished the regions and districts created in 1975 and established 32 single-tier council areas across Scotland, one being the city of Glasgow. The council adopted its modern name of "Glasgow City Council" following these reforms. The council area created in 1996 was smaller than the district which had existed between 1975 and 1996, with the Rutherglen and Cambuslang area being transferred instead to the new South Lanarkshire council area following a local referendum.

In September 2023, Glasgow City Council paused a plan to dismiss and re-engage more than 23,000 staff on new contracts. This 'fire and rehire' plan was linked to negotiations over a new pay and grading structure, with talks set to resume the following week.

== Political control ==
For political control before 1975 see Politics of Glasgow

The council has been under no overall control since 2017. Following the 2022 election a Scottish National Party minority administration formed to run the council with informal support from the Greens.

The first election to the City of Glasgow District Council was held in 1974, initially operating as a shadow authority alongside the outgoing corporation until the new system came into force on 16 May 1975. A shadow authority was again elected in 1995 ahead of the reforms which came into force on 1 April 1996. Political control of the council since 1975 has been as follows:

City of Glasgow District Council

Party in control	Years
Labour	1975–1977
No overall control	1977–1980
Labour	1980–1996

Glasgow City Council

Party in control	Years
Labour	1996–2017
No overall control	2017–present

=== Leadership ===
For leaders before 1996 see Politics of Glasgow

The council is ceremonially headed by the Lord Provost of Glasgow, who convenes meetings of the council and performs associated tasks as a general civic leader. The role dates from the 15th century. Since 1893, when the city was made a county of itself, the Lord Provost has also acted as Lord Lieutenant of the city. The Lord Provost, elected in May 2022 in the city's election, was Jacqueline McLaren.

Political leadership is provided by the leader of the council. The first leader following the 1996 reforms, Bob Gould, was the last leader of Strathclyde Regional Council. The city council changed from an executive-led governance system to a committee-led system in September 2017, with the leader of the council since then chairing the City Administration Committee. The leaders since 1996 have been:

Councillor	Party	From	To
Bob Gould	Labour	1 Apr 1996	10 Oct 1997
Frank McAveety	Labour	10 Oct 1997	May 1999
Charlie Gordon	Labour	20 May 1999	24 May 2005
Steven Purcell	Labour	24 May 2005	2 Mar 2010
Gordon Matheson	Labour	13 May 2010	10 Sep 2015
Frank McAveety	Labour	10 Sep 2015	May 2017
Susan Aitken	SNP	18 May 2017	10 Sep 2026
Ricky Bell	SNP	10 Sep 2026	

=== Composition ===
Following the 2022 election and subsequent by-elections and changes of allegiance up to October 2026, the composition of the council was:

Party	Seats
SNP	37
Labour	31
Green	8
Your Party	3
Reform	2
Conservative	1
Independent	3
Total	85

The next election is due in 2027.

== Elections ==
The council consists of 85 councillors elected for a five-year term from 23 wards. Since 2007 elections have been held every five years under the single transferable vote system, introduced by the Local Governance (Scotland) Act 2004 to replace the first-past-the-post system.

The most recent full council election took place on 5 May 2022, in which no party held a majority of the seats, as had also been the case in the preceding 2017 election. The Scottish National Party remained the largest party, winning 37 seats, whilst Labour won 36 seats, an increase relative to its 2017 result. The Greens won ten seats, also improving on their position in 2017, whilst the Conservatives lost all but two councillors.

The next election is due to take place on 6 May 2027. Election results since 1995 have been as follows:

Year	Seats	SNP	Labour	Green	Conservative	Liberal Democrats	Independent / Other	Notes
1995	83	1	77	0	3	1	1 (Note: Scottish Militant Labour)	Labour majority
1999	79	2	74	0	1	1	1 (Note: Scottish Socialist Party)	New ward boundaries. Labour majority
2003	79	3	71	0	1	3	1	Labour majority
2007	79	22	45	5	1	5	1 (Note: Solidarity)	New ward boundaries. Labour majority
2012	79	27	44	5	1	1	1 (Note: Glasgow First)	Labour majority
2017	85	39	31	7	8	0	0	New ward boundaries. SNP minority
2022	85	37	36	10	2	0	0	SNP minority

== Premises ==
The council has its meeting place and main offices at Glasgow City Chambers in George Square.

Glasgow Corporation was based at the Tolbooth at Glasgow Cross from at least the fifteenth century, which was rebuilt several times. The last Tolbooth on the site was built in 1626. Most of that building was demolished in 1921, leaving only the steeple standing as a clock tower.

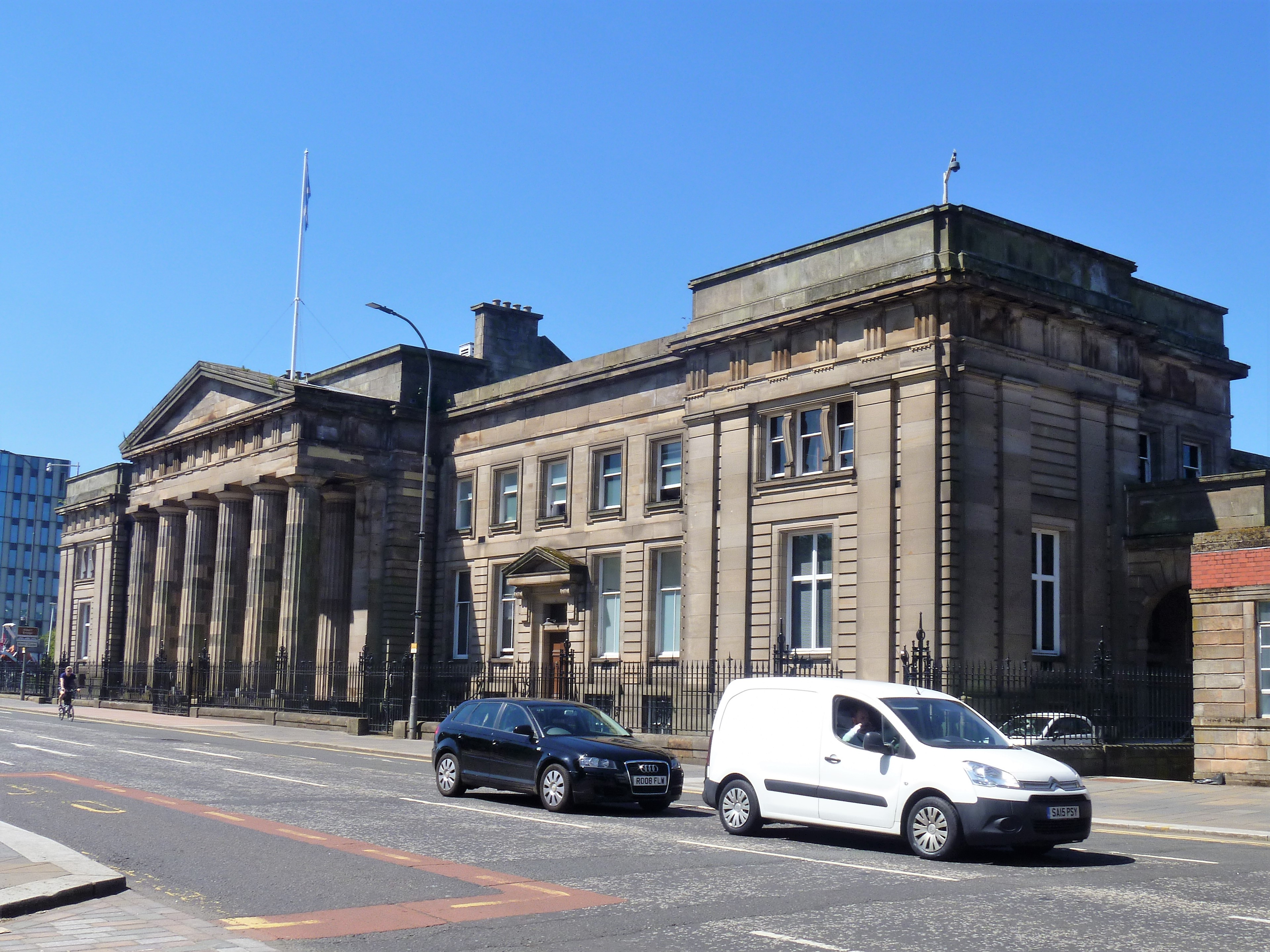
Justiciary Buildings, Saltmarket: Corporation's meeting place 1814–1844

In 1814 the corporation vacated the Tolbooth and moved to the new Justiciary Buildings on Saltmarket, overlooking Glasgow Green. The building served both as council chamber and offices for the corporation and as the courthouse for the Lower Ward of Lanarkshire. In 1844 the corporation and sheriff court moved to the new Sheriff Court on Wilson Street. The Justiciary Buildings on Saltmarket thereafter served solely as a courthouse.

In 1889 the council moved to its own purpose-built headquarters at the City Chambers in George Square.

== Wards ==
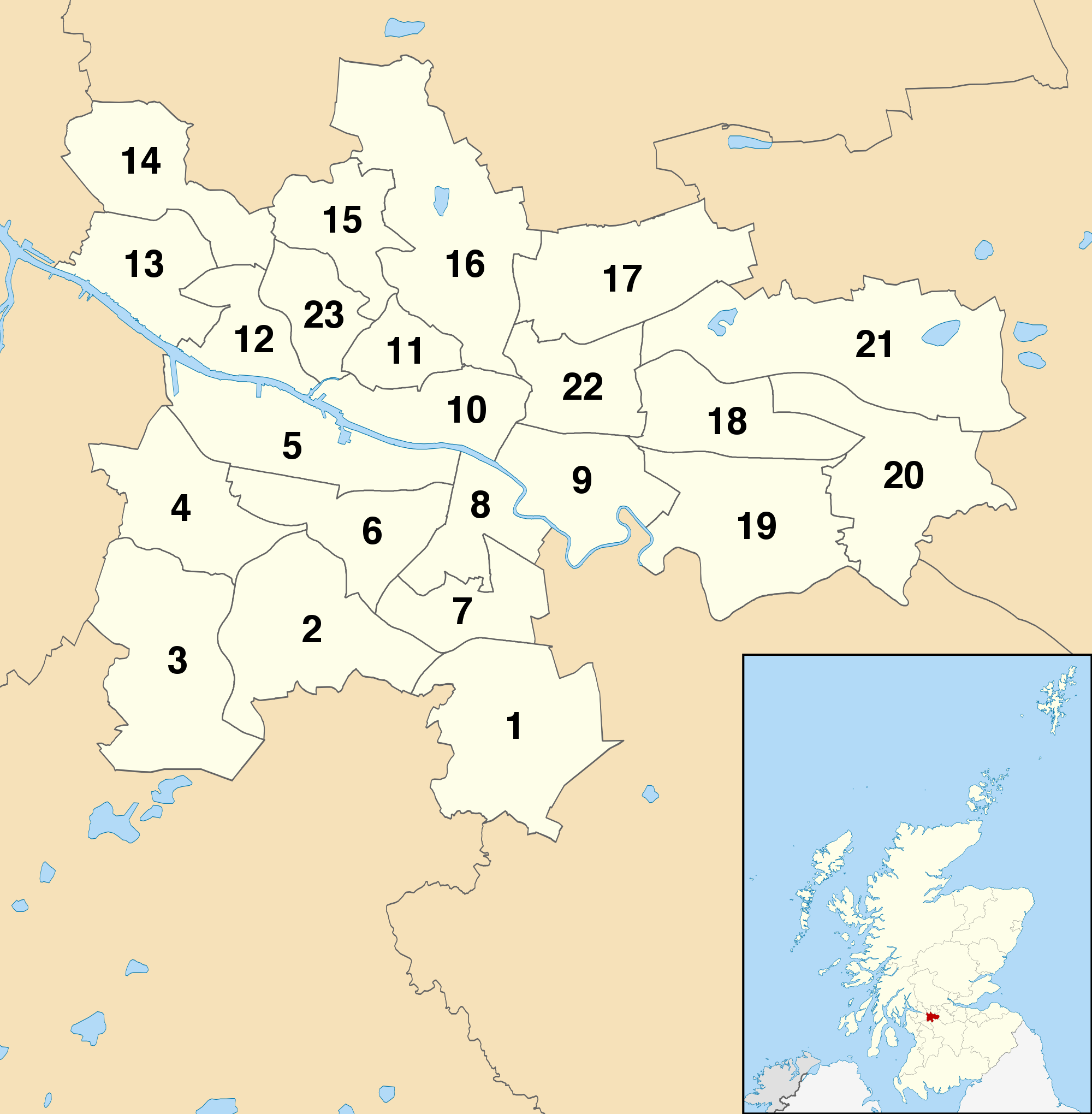
Current multi-member wards by number

The current multi-member ward system (23 wards, 85 seats) was introduced for the 2017 council election, replacing a similar model (21 wards, 79 seats) in place between 2007 and 2017:

Ward number	Ward	Seats	Population (2015)
1	Linn (Note: Carmunnock, Castlemilk, Cathcart (part), Croftfoot, King's Park (part), Muirend, Simshill)	4	29,575
2	Newlands/Auldburn (Note: Arden, Auldhouse, Carnwadric, Cowglen, Eastwood, Hillpark, Kennishead, Mansewood, Merrylee, Newlands, Pollokshaws)	3	23,144
3	Greater Pollok (Note: Crookston (part), Darnley, Deaconsbank, Hurlet, Nitshill, Parkhouse, Pollok (part), Priesthill, Southpark)	4	30,729
4	Cardonald (Note: Cardonald, Corkerhill, Crookston (part), Hillington, Mosspark, Penilee, Pollok (part))	4	29,639
5	Govan (Note: Cessnock, Drumoyne, Govan, Ibrox, Kinning Park, Shieldhall, Tradeston)	4	26,769
6	Pollokshields (Note: Bellahouston, Craigton, Dumbreck, Pollokshields, Port Eglinton, Shawlands (part), Strathbungo)	4	27,983
7	Langside (Note: Battlefield, Cathcart (part), Langside, King's Park (part), Mount Florida, Shawlands (part), Toryglen)	4	29,060
8	Southside Central (Note: Crosshill, Gorbals, Queen's Park, Govanhill, Hutchesontown, Oatlands)	4	25,266
9	Calton (Note: Barrowfield, Bridgeton, Calton, Dalmarnock, Gallowgate, Newbank, Parkhead (part))	4	27,460
10	Anderston/City/Yorkhill (Note: Anderston, Charing Cross, Cowcaddens, Finnieston, Garnethill, Glasgow City Centre, Kelvingrove, Kelvinhaugh, Merchant City, Townhead, Yorkhill)	4	30,184
11	Hillhead (Note: Hillhead, Kelvinbridge, North Kelvinside, Park District, St George's Cross, Woodlands, Woodside)	3	25,411
12	Victoria Park (Note: Anniesland (part), Broomhill, Glasgow Harbour, Jordanhill, Thornwood, Whiteinch)	3	20,950
13	Garscadden/Scotstounhill (Note: Garscadden, Knightswood (part), Scotstounhill, Scotstoun, Yoker)	4	30,565
14	Drumchapel/Anniesland (Note: Anniesland (part), Blairdardie, Drumchapel, Knightswood (part), Old Drumchapel, Temple)	4	29,432
15	Maryhill (Note: Gilshochill, Maryhill, Summerston, Wyndford)	3	22,244
16	Canal (Note: Cadder, Colston, Hamiltonhill, Milton, Lambhill, Parkhouse, Port Dundas, Possilpark, Ruchill)	4	25,000
17	Springburn/Robroyston (Note: Balornock, Barmulloch, Millerston (part), Robroyston, Springburn)	4	27,237
18	East Centre (Note: Barlanark, Cranhill, Carntyne, Greenfield Riddrie, Springboig)	4	27,991
19	Shettleston (Note: Braidfauld, Carmyle, Lilybank, Mount Vernon, Parkhead (part), Sandyhills, Shettleston, Tollcross)	4	25,806
20	Baillieston (Note: Baillieston, Broomhouse, Easthall, Garrowhill, Swinton, Wellhouse)	3	21,663
21	North East (Note: Blackhill, Craigend, Easterhouse, Garthamlock, Hogganfield, Ruchazie)	3	20,457
22	Dennistoun (Note: Dennistoun, Germiston, Haghill, Royston, Sighthill)	3	20,861
23	Partick East/Kelvindale (Note: Dowanhill, Hyndland, Kelvindale, Kelvinside, Partick (part))	4	28,914

Ward notes

== See also ==
- Demographics of Glasgow
- Politics of Scotland

== Footnotes ==
Awards and achievements
Preceded by Durham	LGC Council of the Year; 2015	Succeeded by Tameside Metropolitan
