= Lilybank =

Neighbourhood of Glasgow, Scotland

Coordinates: 55.846035°N 4.192854°W

- Location within Glasgow
- OS grid reference: NS628636
- Council area: Glasgow City Council
- Lieutenancy area: Glasgow
- Country: Scotland
- Sovereign state: United Kingdom
- Post town: GLASGOW
- Postcode district: G31 4 / G32 8
- Dialling code: 0141
- Police: Scotland
- Fire: Scottish
- Ambulance: Scottish
- UK Parliament: Glasgow East
- Scottish Parliament: Glasgow Shettleston

Lilybank is a neighbourhood in the east of Glasgow, Scotland. Neighbouring areas Newbank to the west, Braidfauld to the east and the eastern part of Parkhead to the north. The A74 London Road runs to the south, with the land on the opposite side between the road and the River Clyde not used for residential purposes: the Barrowfield football training ground owned by Celtic F.C., and the Dewar's whisky bottling plant and warehouses, the latter on the former Westthorn country estate.

In a wider sense, many residents of Lilybank would consider themselves residents of Parkhead or Tollcross, but they were officially placed within the Braidfauld ward of Glasgow City Council from 1995 to 2007; since then, the neighbourhood (west of Maukinfauld Road) has been in the Calton ward, while surrounding streets to the north and east fall under Shettleston ward.

== History ==
The area was farmland until the 1930s, though small industries such as rope and brickworks had also been established, as well as Wilson's Boilermakers. The Lilybank housing scheme, named after the Lilybank Boiler Works, comprising "Rehousing" grade accommodation of low build quality (three-storey tile-roofed tenements of grey reconstituted stone, with back-courts for drying greens, normally containing six flats, all accessed from a doorless close) was opened in 1933 to accommodate tenants from the 19th-century slum clearance in Calton, Camlachie, Garngad and Parkhead.

Most blocks were demolished in the 1990s and replaced by modern housing. At the time of the construction of the original housing, the small ground of Parkhead F.C., Helenslea Park, was located to the west between Lilybank and Newbank; the club went defunct in the 1960s and the football pitch is no longer present, but it has been retained as an open public park; the only buildings on the site in the 2010s are named after Helenslea: a nursery school and community centre. Parkhead Fire station was also located in Lilybank from 1952 until 2011.

In 1977, the neighbourhood was subject of a BBC Television documentary made by social activist Kay Carmichael, who lived on benefits in the community for some months while being recorded on hidden cameras to find out about the conditions for the city's poor; local residents were unimpressed at the unflattering way the area was portrayed.
