= Carntyne railway station =

Railway station in Glasgow, Scotland

Carntyne Scottish Gaelic: Càrn-Tìn
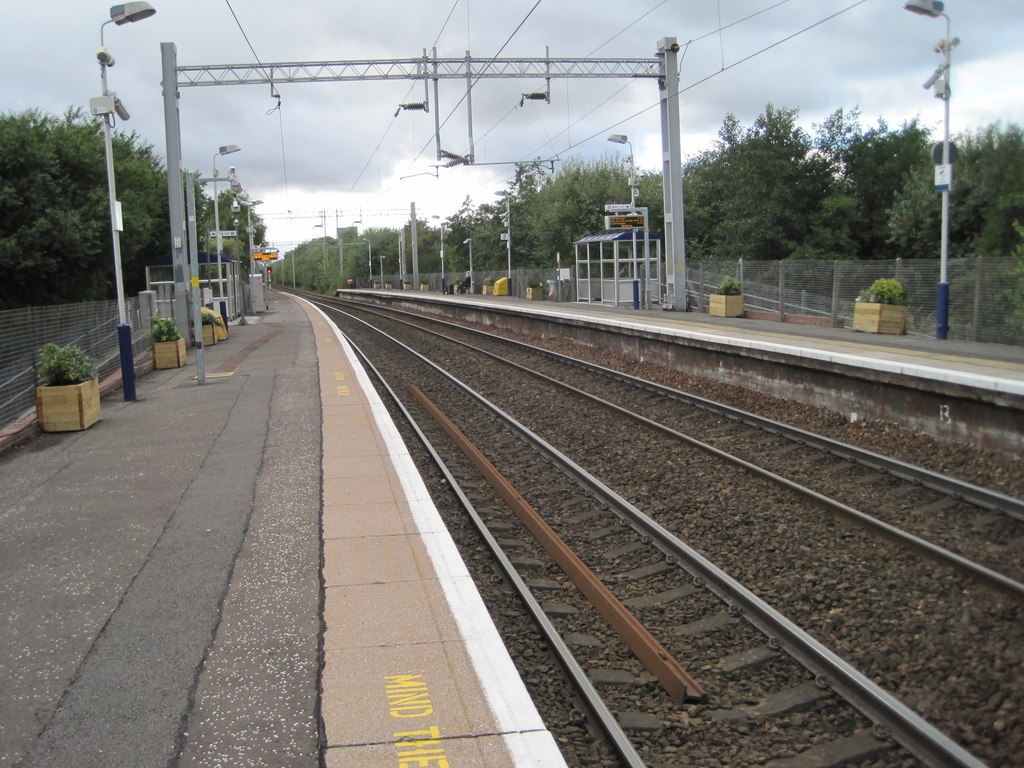

General information
- Location: Carntyne, Glasgow; Scotland
- Coordinates: 55.8549°N 4.1791°W
- Grid reference: NS636645
- Managed by: ScotRail
- Platforms: 2

Other information
- Station code: CAY

Passengers
- 2020/21: ▼61,828
- 2021/22: ▲0.203 million
- 2022/23: ▲0.255 million
- 2023/24: ▲0.362 million
- 2024/25: ▲0.384 million
Location
Notes
- Passenger statistics from the Office of Rail and Road

Carntyne railway station serves the Carntyne area of Glasgow, Scotland. The station is 2¾ miles (4 km) east of Glasgow Queen Street railway station on the North Clyde Line. The station is managed by ScotRail. The ticket office, constructed when the line was electrified by British Railways in 1960, was cleared away in the early 1990s leaving Carntyne station unstaffed and with only basic 'bus stop'-style shelters on the platforms for passengers to use. Despite its name, the station is actually located in the neighbouring district of Shettleston which has its own station on the line one stop to the east.

== Services ==
As of 19 May 2026:

- 2tph service to Edinburgh Waverley.
- 2tph service to Airdrie.
- 2tph service to Balloch via Singer.
- 2tph service to Milngavie (Appears at certain hours of the day.)
- 2tph service to Helensburgh Central via Singer (Will skip Carntyne if trains to Milngavie appear.)

Evening services are as follows:

- 2tph service to Edinburgh Waverley.
- 2tph service to Helensburgh Central via Singer.

Sunday services are as follows:

- 2tph service to Edinburgh Waverley.
- 2tph service to Helensburgh Central via Singer.

Additional service information:

- Trains to Helensburgh Central will not call at Kilpatrick or Bowling. Please board the services to Balloch for those stations.
- When trains to Milngavie appear, half the services to Edinburgh Waverley will skip this station (there would be 4tph instead of 2tph going to Edinburgh Waverley at this stage), and the ones that do call here will skip Garrowhill, Easterhouse, Blairhill, and Coatdyke as those stations don't receive services to Milngavie. Board the services to Airdrie for those stations.
- When trains to Milngavie don't appear, then the trains to Edinburgh Waverley call at all stations and none will skip this station.

Preceding station	National Rail	Following station
Shettleston	ScotRail; North Clyde Line	Bellgrove
