= Springhill, Glasgow =

Coordinates: 55.8572°N 4.1152°W

Springhill
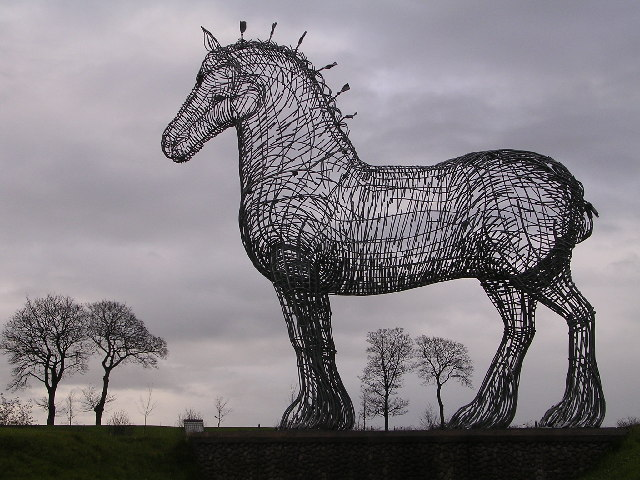
- Andy Scott's Heavy Horse sculpture at Glasgow Business Park

- Location within Glasgow
- OS grid reference: NS677647
- Council area: Glasgow City Council
- Lieutenancy area: Glasgow
- Country: Scotland
- Sovereign state: United Kingdom
- Post town: GLASGOW
- Postcode district: G69
- Dialling code: 0141
- Police: Scotland
- Fire: Scottish
- Ambulance: Scottish
- UK Parliament: Glasgow East
- Scottish Parliament: Glasgow Provan

Springhill is a district in the Scottish city of Glasgow. It is situated north of the River Clyde on the eastern edge of the city, north of the areas of Baillieston and Garrowhill and west of Swinton.

Springhill consists mainly of semi-detached and detached family houses built in the 1990s, as well as Glasgow Business Park, a partly-completed industrial and commercial estate near to the neighbourhoods of Barlanark and Easthall, which features the local DVSA driving test centre and a 4-metre high landmark wire sculpture of a Clydesdale Horse by Andy Scott, who has other works on display in the vicinity - a phoenix in Easterhouse and a group of sirens at the water tower in Cranhill. The district has a few local shops as well as a pub/restaurant, but most other amenities are located in Baillieston or Easterhouse.

Easterhouse railway station gives direct access to the centre of Glasgow and regular local bus services run along Edinburgh Road to the south of the district. Springhill can be accessed from the M8 motorway, using junctions 9 or 10.

Sandaig Primary School and St Bridget's Primary School serve the local area, and from here pupils attend St Ambrose High School Coatbridge, and Bannerman High School.
