= Scotstounhill railway station =

Railway station in Glasgow, Scotland

Scotstounhill Scottish Gaelic: Cnoc Scotstoun
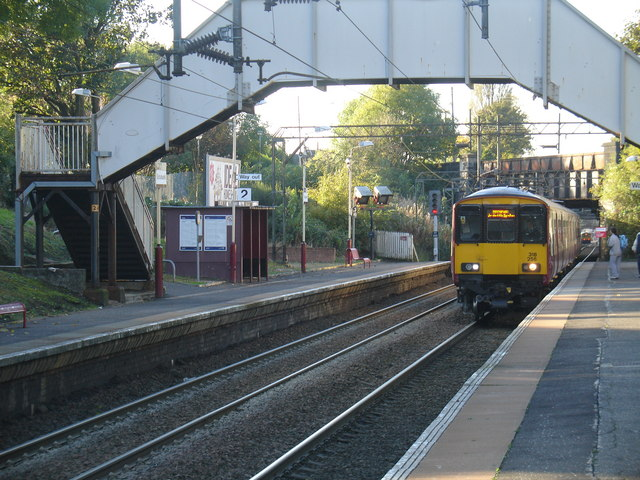
- View from Platform 1 looking west towards Dalmuir

General information
- Location: Scotstounhill, Glasgow; Scotland
- Coordinates: 55.8849°N 4.3524°W
- Grid reference: NS529682
- Manager: ScotRail
- Platforms: 2

Other information
- Station code: SCH

History
- Original company: Glasgow, Yoker and Clydebank Railway
- Pre-grouping: North British Railway
- Post-grouping: LNER

Key dates
- 1883: Opened

Passengers
- 2021/22: ▲0.238 million
- 2022/23: ▲0.294 million
- 2023/24: ▲0.402 million
- 2024/25: ▲0.431 million
- 2025/26: ▲0.453 million
Location
Notes
- Passenger statistics from the Office of Rail and Road

Scotstounhill railway station serves Scotstounhill in Glasgow, Scotland. The station lies on the Argyle and North Clyde lines, serving the districts of Scotstoun and Knightswood, with trains to and from Glasgow Central or Queen Street stations and on into the east end.

== Services ==
- 2tph to Whifflet via Glasgow Central Low Level, with one through to Motherwell
- 2tph to Cumbernauld via Glasgow Queen Street Low Level
- 4tph to Dalmuir, with 2 continuing through to Dumbarton Central

Additional services to/from Garscadden stop at peak periods. On Sundays there are 2tph to Balloch and to Glasgow Central L.L (and thence alternately to Larkhall and Motherwell via the Hamilton Circle).

| Preceding station | National Rail | Following station |
|---|---|---|
| Jordanhill | ScotRail; Argyle Line | Garscadden |
| Jordanhill | ScotRail; North Clyde Line | Garscadden |
| | Historical railways | |
| Anniesland | North British Railway; Glasgow, Yoker and Clydebank Railway | Yoker |
| Jordanhill | North British Railway; Glasgow, Yoker and Clydebank Railway | Yoker |

== Sources ==
- Butt, R. V. J. (October 1995). The Directory of Railway Stations: details every public and private passenger station, halt, platform and stopping place, past and present (1st ed.). Sparkford: Patrick Stephens Ltd. ISBN 978-1-85260-508-7. OCLC 60251199. OL 11956311M.
- Jowett, Alan (March 1989). Jowett's Railway Atlas of Great Britain and Ireland: From Pre-Grouping to the Present Day (1st ed.). Sparkford: Patrick Stephens Ltd. ISBN 978-1-85260-086-0. OCLC 22311137.
- Jowett, Alan (2000). Jowett's Nationalised Railway Atlas (1st ed.). Penryn, Cornwall: Atlantic Transport Publishers. ISBN 978-0-906899-99-1. OCLC 228266687.
