= Hamiltonhill =

Coordinates: 55.878938°N 4.261859°W

- Location within Glasgow
- OS grid reference: NS586674
- Council area: Glasgow City Council
- Lieutenancy area: Glasgow
- Country: Scotland
- Sovereign state: United Kingdom
- Post town: GLASGOW
- Postcode district: G22 5
- Dialling code: 0141
- Police: Scotland
- Fire: Scottish
- Ambulance: Scottish
- UK Parliament: Glasgow North East
- Scottish Parliament: Glasgow Maryhill and Springburn

Hamiltonhill is a residential neighbourhood in the Scottish city of Glasgow, situated between Possilpark to the north and east and Port Dundas to the south. To the west of Hamiltonhill is a nature reserve bordering the Forth and Clyde Canal's Glasgow Branch section (with Firhill Stadium on the opposite bank). The neighbourhood falls under the Canal ward of Glasgow City Council.

The area consisted primarily of Rehousing (low build quality) grey reconstituted stone tenements from the 1930s. Many of these blocks were refurbished in the 1990s, but by the 2010s almost all had been demolished along with the local schools (St Cuthbert's Primary, which was relocated in 2012 to a new facility in Ruchill Park, closer to parts of the district where new homes had already been built) and Wester Common Primary. Another new school complex for children residing locally, 'Keppoch Campus', was also constructed on the eastern side of Possilpark in the 2000s. Some cottage flats dating from the same period as the tenements were retained, with the result that several clusters of surviving homes in Hamiltonhill were surrounded by expanses of empty waste ground in every direction.

In 2018, the local Queens Cross Housing Association published a renewal masterplan for the area involving over 600 new homes.
