= Carntyne =

Suburban district in Glasgow, Scotland

Coordinates: 55.860486°N 4.188874°W

Carntyne: Scottish Gaelic: Càrn an Teine; Scots: Cairntyne
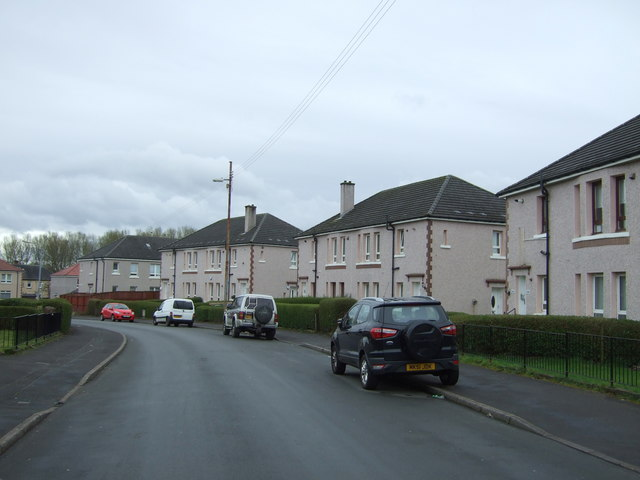
- Typical housing (cottage flats) on Inverleith Street

- Location within Glasgow
- Population: 2,400 (2012 census)
- OS grid reference: NS631652
  - Edinburgh: 44.7 miles
  - London: 400.0 miles
- Council area: Glasgow City Council
- Lieutenancy area: Glasgow
- Country: Scotland
- Sovereign state: United Kingdom
- Post town: GLASGOW
- Postcode district: G32
- Dialling code: 0141
- Police: Scotland
- Fire: Scottish
- Ambulance: Scottish
- UK Parliament: Glasgow North East
- Scottish Parliament: Glasgow Baillieston and Shettleston

Carntyne (/ˌkɑːrnˈtaɪn/; Scottish Gaelic: Càrn an Teine) is a suburban district in the Scottish city of Glasgow. It is situated north of the River Clyde, and in the east end of the city. it has formed the core of the East Centre ward under Glasgow City Council, which also includes the neighbouring Riddrie and Cranhill areas.

Carntyne may have derived its name from the Southern Picto-Scot Settlement of Cairn-ton, however Carntyne may be "fire cairn", from Càrn an Teine in the Gaelic, given the abundance of coal in the area. The colliery was closed in 1875 and houses were built in the 1930s, along with an industrial estate.

The district is traditionally split into High and Lower Carntyne (or North and South Carntyne respectively), the division being the A8 Edinburgh Road dual carriageway which bisects the area, and has a largely ageing population. Most amenities are present, although a wider range of shops and leisure options are found nearby in the older areas of Dennistoun to the west, Parkhead to the south-west and Shettleston to the south.

== Mining ==
The Carntyne estate had long been celebrated for its almost inexhaustible seams of coal. These had been wrought by the Grays, from generation to generation, since about the year 1600. The Carntyne, or better known as "The Westmuir", coalpits long afforded one of the chief sources of fuel supply to Glasgow. In olden time, when people sought to illustrate profundity, they used to cite a then common expression – "As deep as Carntyne Heugh."

The first steam engine used in the West of Scotland for draining water from coal mines was erected at Carntyne in 1768. Previous to its erection, the water was for some time drawn off by the agency of a windmill, until it was blown to pieces in a great storm, long popularly described as "the Windy Saturday." In the Clyde Iron Works, the local mines had an industrial client requiring large coal supplies. The colliery was finally abandoned in 1875.

In that era, there was a settlement known as 'Low Carntyne', however this is on the opposite side of the railway lines from the 20th century housing and today is the western part of Shettleston (adjoining Parkhead at Westmuir Street), taking its earlier name from factories which had been established in that area that in turn were named after the rural estate to the north.

== Housing estate ==
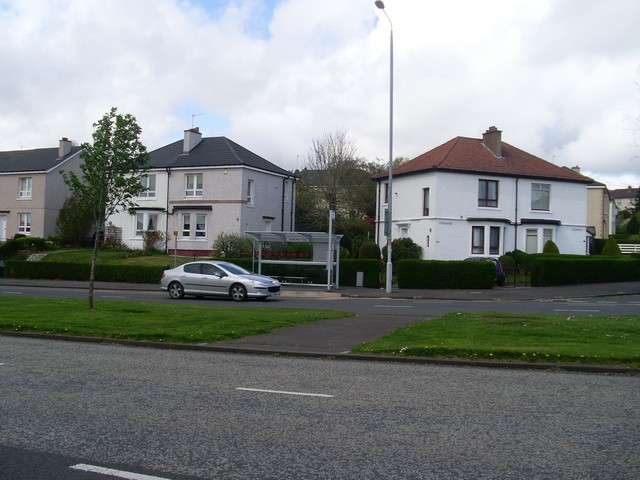
Edinburgh Road

The housing scheme which is now known as Carntyne was built during the inter-war years to provide more housing for the overcrowded population of inner Glasgow. At the time, it was at Glasgow's most easterly point and was built around the A8 to Edinburgh, and therefore the streets are named after places in and around Edinburgh: Haymarket Street, Inverleith Street, Morningside Street, Gorebridge Street etc. with the exception of Carntyne Road and Carntynehall Road, the latter referring to the large house which stood in the centre of the district from 1802 to the 1920s.

The development included 500 'Sunlit' homes with flat roofs which later had to be augmented with traditional pitched roofs to combat water ingress from Glasgow's frequent rains, and around 1000 of the 'Winget' type which was found to be defective in the 1980s, although it was not until the 2010s that the majority of the buildings were refurbished, with a smaller number demolished - as had been the original intention with the entire estate, causing years of delay while the matter was debated extensively.

Upper Carntyne is one of the more affluent areas in the East End of Glasgow.

'Eastfields', a development of 537 houses and 152 apartments partly on land which was originally a section of the area's industrial estate, partly in place of a small cluster of tenements built after the lower density housing in the area but which did not stand the test of time, and partly on the site of Carntyne Stadium (near to the North Clyde Line railway and stretching almost from Haghill to Greenfield) was constructed between 2007 and 2019 by Bellway Homes; local press focused on the closure of an important through road as part of the plans, which was completed despite residents' protests.

== Religion ==
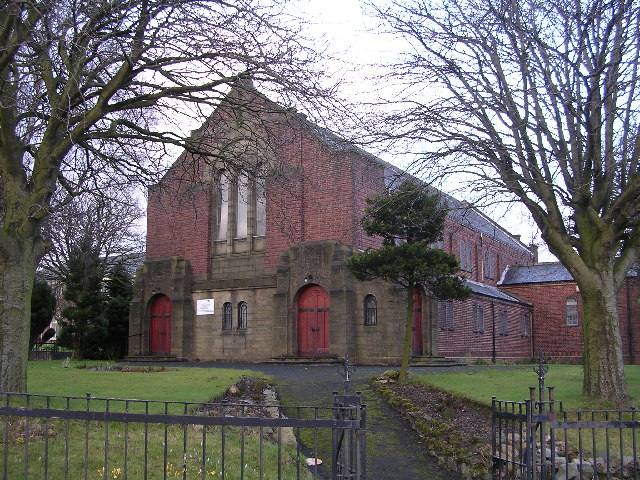
High Carntyne parish church

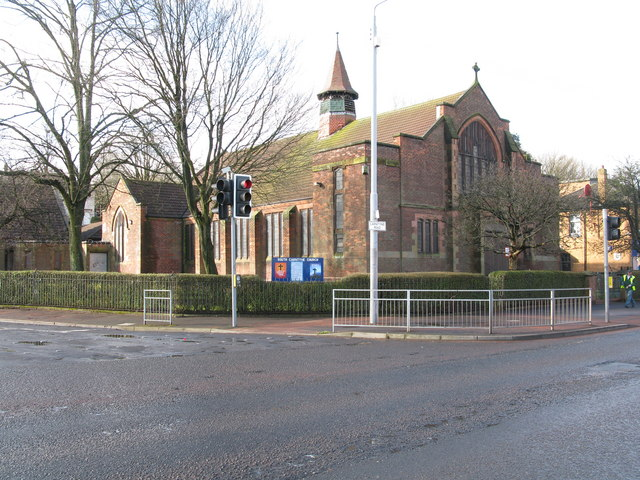
South Carntyne parish church

In January 2016, South Carntyne Church closed, and the Congregation amalgamated with High Carntyne to form what is now called Carntyne Parish Church. The South Carntyne building has since been bought by another denomination.

There are three churches: Carntyne Church in the north (Church of Scotland), an Ethiopian Orthodox Church in the South (previously South Carntyne), and St Bernadette's Church on Carntyne Road (Roman Catholic) situated opposite the north exit of Rigby Street.

== Transport ==
The area is served by Carntyne railway station on the southern periphery of the district which provides links to Glasgow City Centre every 15 minutes. First Bus also operate frequent services, including the 41, 43, and 46 routes offering access to the City Centre, Easterhouse, Parkhead, and Castlemilk.

== Education ==
It is served by Carntyne Primary School, in the north-east area.

St Andrew's Secondary, one of the main Roman Catholic schools serving the East End (along with St Mungo's Academy) is located in Carntyne, near to Springboig.

== Sport ==
Carntyne Stadium was a former multi-sports stadium situated along the railway track sandwiched between the railway and Myreside Street and was built on the site of a former running and trotting track. It was used mainly for greyhound racing and speedway between 1927 and 1972.
