= Mount Vernon North railway station =

Former railway station in Scotland

Mount Vernon North

General information
- Location: Mount Vernon, Glasgow; Scotland
- Coordinates: 55.8454°N 4.1409°W
- Platforms: 2

Other information
- Status: Disused

History
- Original company: Glasgow, Bothwell, Hamilton and Coatbridge Railway
- Pre-grouping: North British Railway
- Post-grouping: LNER

Key dates
- 1883: Opened as Mount Vernon
- 1 January 1917: Closed
- 2 June 1919: Re-opened
- September 1952: Renamed as Mount Vernon North
- 4 July 1955: Closed
Location

Mount Vernon railway station served the Mount Vernon area of Glasgow, Scotland on the Glasgow, Bothwell, Hamilton and Coatbridge Railway between Shettleston and Hamilton.

== History ==
Mount Vernon was opened 1883 on the Glasgow, Bothwell, Hamilton and Coatbridge Railway. It was closed as a wartime economy measure between 1917 and 1919. Following nationalisation the station was renamed as Mount Vernon North to avoid confusion with the nearby Rutherglen and Coatbridge Railway station of the same name. Mount Vernon North was closed on 4 July 1955. The line closed to freight traffic on 4 October 1964.

== Services ==
Preceding station	Disused railways	Following station
Shettleston	North British Railway; Glasgow, Bothwell, Hamilton and Coatbridge Railway	Broomhouse
