= Stobhill =

Coordinates: 55.893103°N 4.224298°W

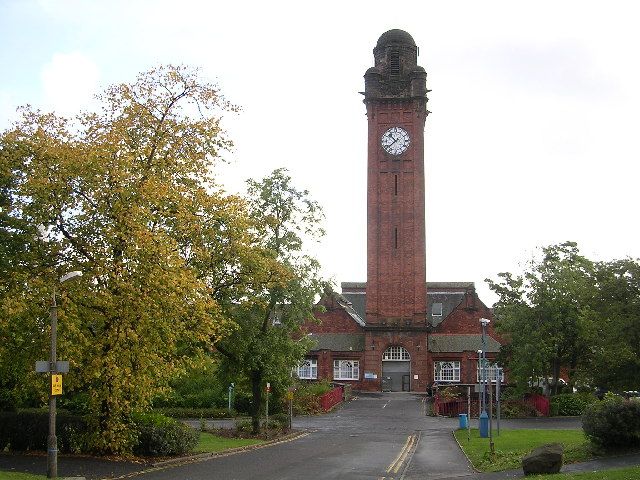
- Clock Tower, Stobhill Hospital, 2005

- Location within Glasgow
- OS grid reference: NS610689
- Council area: Glasgow City Council
- Lieutenancy area: Glasgow
- Country: Scotland
- Sovereign state: United Kingdom
- Post town: GLASGOW
- Postcode district: G21
- Dialling code: 0141
- Police: Scotland
- Fire: Scottish
- Ambulance: Scottish
- UK Parliament: Glasgow North East
- Scottish Parliament: Glasgow Maryhill and Springburn

Stobhill is a district in the Scottish city of Glasgow. It is situated north of the River Clyde. Part of Springburn, it gives its name to Stobhill Hospital. The hospital consists of an old building and a new hospital. In the old hospital, many of the buildings are Category B listed but were damaged by fire in 2018 and have seen becoming derelict and abandoned.
