= Colston, Glasgow =

Area in Glasgow, Scotland

Coordinates: 55.899185°N 4.235843°W

Colston
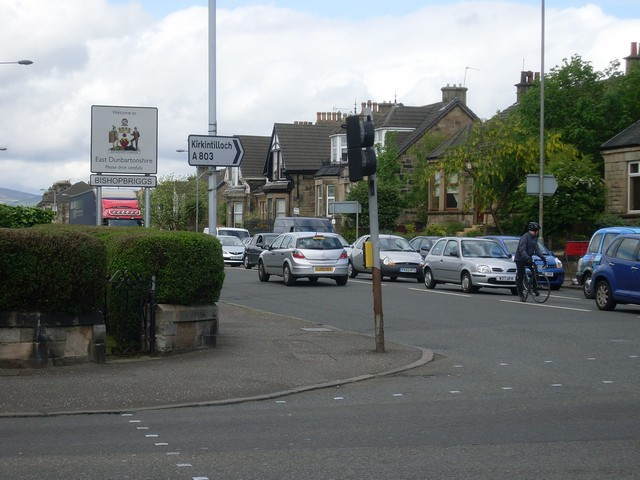
- Looking north across Colston Road to Bishopbriggs welcome sign on Kirkintilloch Road

- Location within Scotland Colston (Scotland)
- Population: 1,700
- OS grid reference: NS603696
- Lieutenancy area: Glasgow
- Country: Scotland
- Sovereign state: United Kingdom
- Post town: GLASGOW
- Postcode district: G21 1 / G64
- Dialling code: 0141
- Police: Scotland
- Fire: Scottish
- Ambulance: Scottish
- UK Parliament: Glasgow North East
- Scottish Parliament: Glasgow Maryhill and Springburn

Colston is a mostly residential area in the Scottish city of Glasgow; situated on the northern edge of the city, it is surrounded by the Glasgow areas of Milton to the west and Springburn to the east, and the town of Bishopbriggs to the north. The main road through Colston is the A803 (Springburn Road), which then becomes Kirkintilloch Road once past Colston to the north through Bishopbriggs.

Colston Secondary School, which was established in the 1900s, closed in the late 1980s and housing built on the site, but some of the buildings were retained and were converted into laboratories used by Scottish Water. Most children in the Colston area now attend the re-built Springburn Academy.

The nearest shopping centres are Springburn Shopping Centre and Bishopbriggs town centre; however, there are several take-away shops and a supermarket within the Colston area. Stobhill Hospital is the nearest hospital, a short distance to the east.

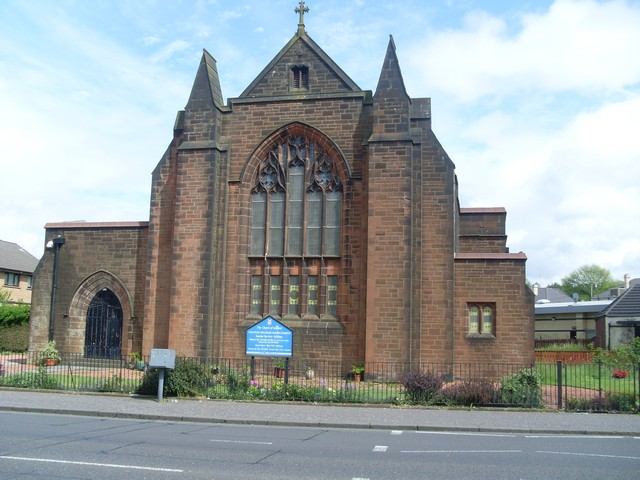
Colston Wellpark Parish Church

Administratively, most of the neighbourhood (south of Colston Road) is under Glasgow City Council, with the streets west of Springburn Road falling within the Canal ward and those to its east within Springburn/Robroyston ward; everything north of Colston Road is in East Dunbartonshire and regarded as part of Bishopbriggs.
