= A8 road (Scotland) =

Road in Scotland

A8

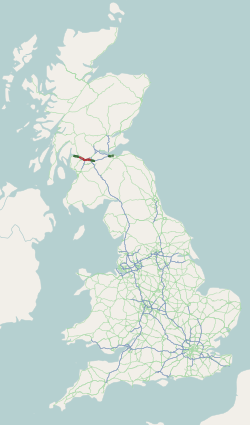

Route information
- Part of E05
- Length: 42.9 mi (69.0 km)

Major junctions
- East end: Edinburgh; 55.9501°N 3.2076°W
- M9 motorway M73; A1; A7; A70 A720; A73; A74; A77; A78; A80; A89; A90
- West end: Greenock; 55.9487°N 4.7565°W

Location
- Country: United Kingdom
- Constituent country: Scotland
- Primary destinations: Greenock, Glasgow Airport, Glasgow, Livingston, Edinburgh

Road network
- Roads in the United Kingdom; Motorways; A and B road zones

The A8 is a major road in Scotland, connecting Edinburgh to Greenock via Glasgow. Its importance diminished following the construction of the M8 motorway which also covers the route between Edinburgh and Glasgow.

== Route and relationship to M8 ==
=== Edinburgh ===
The A8 begins at the West End of Edinburgh, in the New Town. The road originally also included Princes Street, but this stretch was declassified, as Princes Street is no longer open to all traffic.

The road continues westwards into the suburbs of the city passing Murrayfield and Corstorphine, often with an accompanying bus lane. Only once the road reaches the A720 City Bypass does it become a primary route, leading out past the Royal Highland Showground at Ingliston, and Edinburgh Airport.

At Newbridge, the A8 meets the start of the M8 and M9 motorways. From here the A8 is interrupted; it has been renumbered A89 until Bathgate, A7066 to Whitburn and then B7066 Harthill, until it resumes at Newhouse.

=== Glasgow ===
From Newhouse it runs parallel to the M8. Until recently there was no road of motorway standard between Newhouse and Baillieston in the eastern suburbs of Glasgow, and the A8 still carried all through traffic here, having been progressively upgraded to meet demand. However it was finally replaced in 2017 by the last section of the M8. It is now the principal non-motorway access between the Eurocentral business park and the settlements of Chapelhall and Calderbank, south of Airdrie.

Just prior to Junction 8 of the M8 it diverges from the motorway, and meets the A89 at Bargeddie while co-existing as the interchange for the M8 and M73. At a roundabout near Swinton it briefly merges with the A89 and heads towards central Glasgow. The A8 now passes through suburban Garrowhill, Barlanark, Wellhouse, Springboig, Cranhill and Carntyne as Edinburgh Road – much of which is a two/three-lane dual-carriageway, but an urban 30 mph (48 km/h) restriction is still applied – then past Haghill and Dennistoun as Alexandra Parade into the city centre at Glasgow Royal Infirmary and Glasgow Cathedral, where it follows the High Street and then the Saltmarket running north–south – meeting the A89 (Gallowgate) and the A749 (London Road) at Glasgow Cross. It splits for the complex one-way system, recombining prior to the junction at the start of the A814 that heads west along the Clyde, before crossing the river near The Gorbals, where it meets the end of the A74.

From there the A8 leads out of town through Tradeston, Kingston (passing under the M8's Kingston Bridge) Kinning Park, Cessnock and Ibrox as Paisley Road West, changing to Edmiston Drive past Ibrox Stadium, then through Drumoyne and Shieldhall as Shieldhall Road, Braehead as Renfrew Road and the town centre of Renfrew as Glasgow Road, Glebe Street and Inchinnan Road, passing to the rear of Glasgow Airport at Inchinnan, crossing over the M8 east of Bishopton and meeting it again at the motorway's western end, Junction 31 between Bishopton and Langbank.

The A8 becomes the primary route again and takes traffic through Port Glasgow. Its terminus is in Greenock at a large roundabout with the A78 road and the A770 to Gourock, which was the former terminus of the A8.

== A8(M) motorway ==
A8(M)
- Baillieston Link
- A8(M) highlighted in blue

Route information
- Length: 0.2 mi (320 m)
- Existed: 2016–present
- History: Construction 2015-2017

Major junctions
- East end: Baillieston Roundabout
- West end: Swinton Roundabout

Location
- Country: United Kingdom
- Primary destinations: Baillieston

Road network
- Roads in the United Kingdom; Motorways; A and B road zones

The A8(M) is a motorway in Glasgow, Scotland.

It was opened in 2016 after the Scottish Government proposed that the Baillieston Roundabout should be the motorway standard and that the A8 was not up to motorway standards.

Work on its construction started in early 2015 to upgrade the road. It is the shortest motorway in the United Kingdom. There is no signage of the A8(M) but signposted as the A8 link from the M73 and M8.

It does however retain its motorway status.

== Euroroute designations ==
Three short stretches of the A8 are part of three different Euroroutes, as follows:

- The stretch from the western end of the M8 into Greenock is part of the E05.
- Between M8 Junctions 6 and 7 is part of the E16.
- A very short stretch linking the A720 and A902 is part of the E15.
