= Swinton, Glasgow =

Coordinates: 55.8574°N 4.1056°W

Swinton
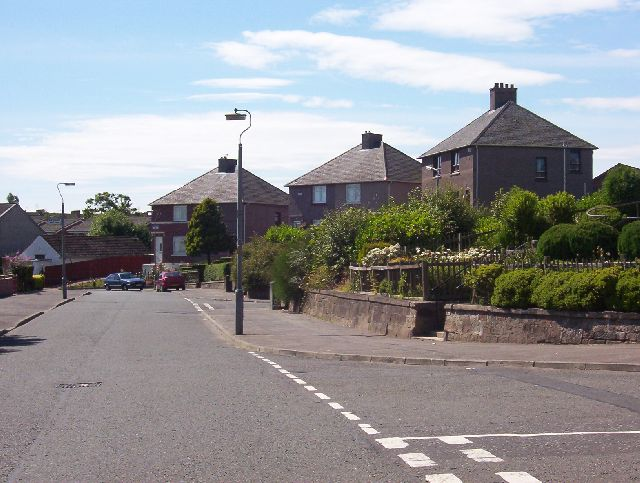
- 1920s houses on Swinton Crescent

- Location within Glasgow
- OS grid reference: NS683647
- Council area: Glasgow City Council
- Lieutenancy area: Glasgow
- Country: Scotland
- Sovereign state: United Kingdom
- Post town: GLASGOW
- Postcode district: G69 6
- Dialling code: 0141
- Police: Scotland
- Fire: Scottish
- Ambulance: Scottish
- UK Parliament: Glasgow East
- Scottish Parliament: Glasgow Shettleston

Swinton is an eastern suburb of the Scottish city of Glasgow, north of the areas of Baillieston and Garrowhill and east of Springhill. It is now concurrent with the 19th century Easterhouse village (whereas the large housing scheme of the same name lies across the M8 motorway to the north of Swinton). The hamlet of Swinton began to emerge with the building of cotton hand loom weavers' cottages in the early 1790s. A housing development was constructed in the 1920s, with more in the 1970s, but most of the current neighbourhood was built from the 1990s onwards.

Easterhouse railway station gives direct access to the centre of Glasgow and regular local bus services run along Edinburgh Road to the south of the district.

Swinton Primary School serves the local area (and Springhill), and from here pupils attend Bannerman High School in Baillieston.
