= Mount Vernon, Glasgow =

Coordinates: 55.843°N 4.142°W

Mount Vernon
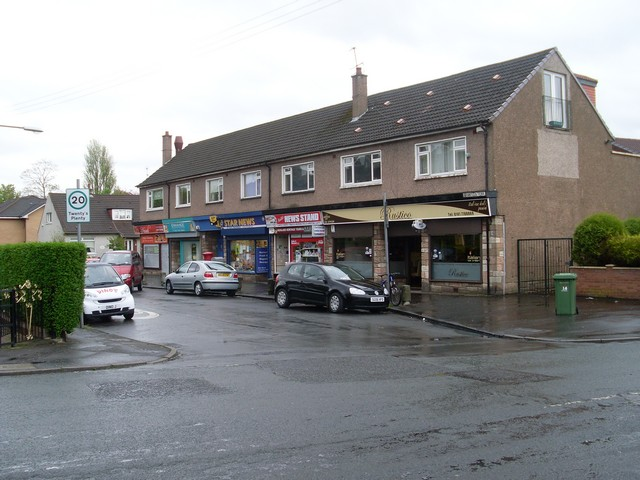
- Mount Vernon's local shops on Grantlea Terrace.

- Location within Glasgow
- OS grid reference: NS658628
- Council area: Glasgow City Council
- Lieutenancy area: Glasgow
- Country: Scotland
- Sovereign state: United Kingdom
- Post town: GLASGOW
- Postcode district: G32 9/0
- Dialling code: 0141
- Police: Scotland
- Fire: Scottish
- Ambulance: Scottish
- UK Parliament: Glasgow East
- Scottish Parliament: Glasgow Shettleston

Mount Vernon is a residential area in the east end of the city of Glasgow, Scotland. It directly borders Sandyhills and Foxley to the west, while Barlanark is the closest neighbourhood to the north, Barrachnie and Baillieston to the east and Carmyle to the south, although Mount Vernon is separated from these by areas of open land, including Early Braes public park and the former Kenmuir farm.

== History ==
The area was originally part of the Parish of Old Monkland, and also of the Barony and Regality of Glasgow. From at least the Middle Ages, the rental book of the Diocese of Glasgow records it as Windy Edge or variations thereof – AD 1526, Jame Browyn rentalit in vs xd land in the Wyndy Hege.

In 1742 a Glasgow merchant named Robert Boyd purchased the 'Old Extent of Windyedge' and renamed it Mount Vernon, in honour of Admiral Edward Vernon of the Royal Navy who was famous at that time for his expedition against the Spanish Main. Another Glasgow merchant, George Buchanan, whose family had extensive interests in tobacco trade purchased the land in 1758 and built an extension to the existing house re-modelling it as a country mansion.

The Mount Vernon of the early 21st century is generally affluent and suburban in character; administratively, the area forms part of the Shettleston ward of Glasgow City Council.

== Landfill site ==
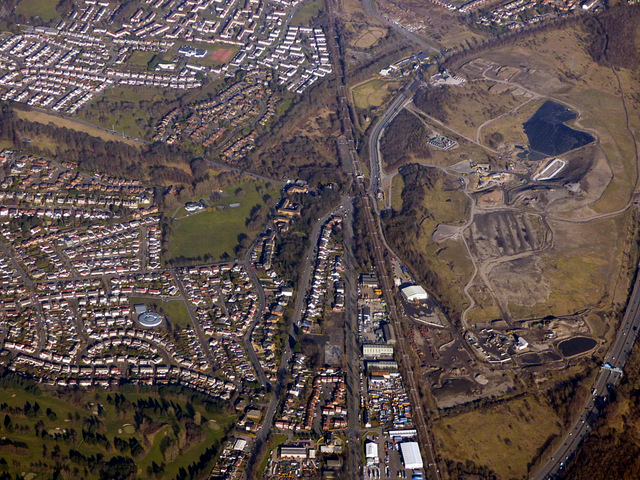
Aerial photograph of southern Mount Vernon and Greenoakhill Quarry from the west, 2018

To the south of Mount Vernon is Greenoakhill Quarry, one of Europe's largest urban landfill sites, operated by Paterson Quarries Limited. The landfill has been operational since 1955 and receives an assortment of high level waste from all over Scotland. The site covers 230 acres (93 ha) and is licensed to take up to 500,000 tonnes of waste per year. Landfill gas from the site is collected to fuel gas turbines generating electricity which is fed back into the National Grid.

Greenoakhill Forest is an ongoing project to transform parts of the landfill site no longer in use into public parkland. The first phase of the restored site is open, with newly planted trees, paths and benches.

== Transport ==
Mount Vernon railway station is on the Glasgow–Whifflet Line.

The M74 motorway runs to the south of Mount Vernon, with Junction 3 the nearest with access to the network in both directions.

== Buildings ==
- Mount Vernon House was situated on the high ground approximately 125 metres (410 ft) to the west of Mount Vernon Avenue. It was demolished in the early part of the 20th century.
- Mount Vernon Community Hall is located within Mount Vernon Park. It is operated as a registered charity and has been serving the community since October 1971; the building is owned by Glasgow City Council. The day-to-day running of the community hall is run by a group of Mount Vernon Community Volunteers. Regular community events and activities take part at the community hall. The Centre Playgroup is also based there.
- Mount Vernon Bowling and Tennis Club, established in the 1890s, is located on Central Grove.

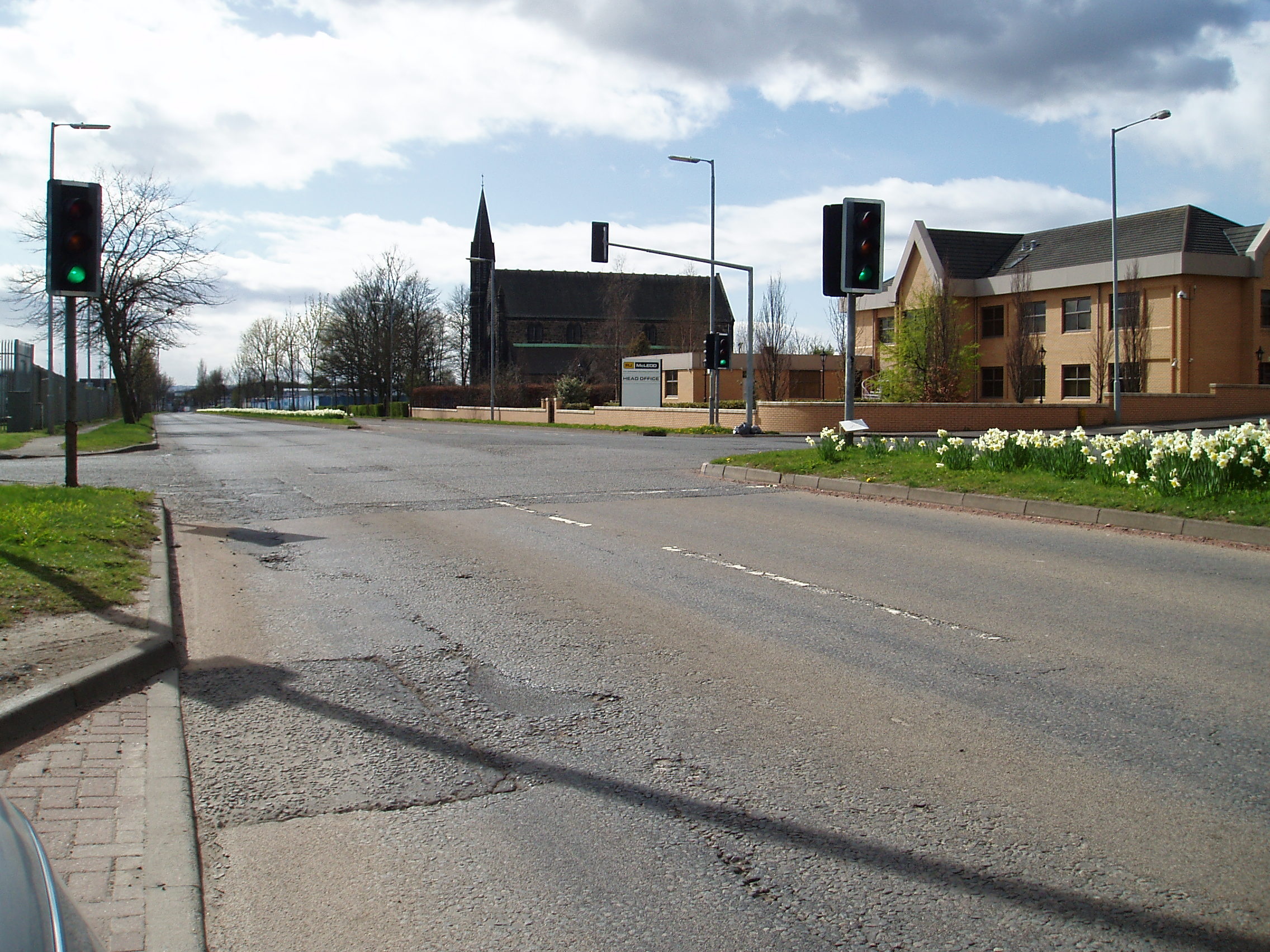
Looking west along London Road (A74) towards Kenmuir Mount Vernon Church

- Local tavern The Woodend has existed as a dwelling since at least 1815 and has been a licensed bar in the area since at least 1852
- Kenmuir Mount Vernon Church (merged with Carmyle's congregation in the 2010s) is located on London Road (A74) at the southern end of the neighbourhood.

== Notable people ==
- John Barrowman (born 1967), Scottish-American actor, author, presenter, singer and comic book writer, born in Mount Vernon.
- Sir John William McNee (1887–1984), pathologist and bacteriologist, born in Mount Vernon.
- Elaine C. Smith (born 1958), actress and comedian.

== Parks ==
- Mount Vernon Park: A play park, MUGA pitch football pitches, community garden, woodland nature trail. Mount Vernon Old Railway runs through Mount Vernon Park and along Carrick Drive.
- Barrachnie Park: Skate park, rugby pitches, running track.
- Early Braes Park: A large grass areas for nature with Tollcross Burn running through it.
