= Lightburn, Glasgow =

Coordinates: 55.8599°N 4.1697°W

Lightburn
- Location within Glasgow
- OS grid reference: NS643651
- Council area: Glasgow City Council
- Lieutenancy area: Glasgow
- Country: Scotland
- Sovereign state: United Kingdom
- Post town: GLASGOW
- Postcode district: G32
- Dialling code: 0141
- Police: Scotland
- Fire: Scottish
- Ambulance: Scottish
- UK Parliament: Glasgow East
- Scottish Parliament: Glasgow Provan

Lightburn is a district in the Scottish city of Glasgow. It is situated north of the River Clyde. It takes its name from the Light Burn which flows through the area, mostly in culvert.

The area has a hospital, established in 1898. There were extensions to the hospital in 1968. As of 2023, the hospital was being used for rehabilitation of older people. There had been plans to close it in 2011 and again in 2018.

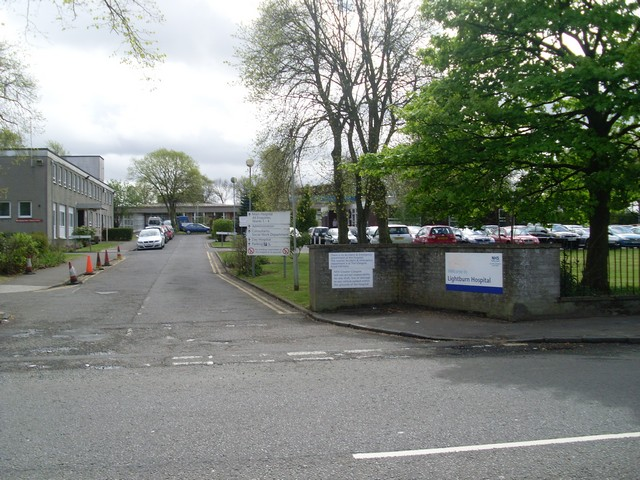
Lightburn Hospital
