= Scotstounhill =

Coordinates: 55.885740°N 4.356793°W

- Location within Glasgow
- OS grid reference: NS527684
- Council area: Glasgow City Council
- Lieutenancy area: Glasgow
- Country: Scotland
- Sovereign state: United Kingdom
- Post town: GLASGOW
- Postcode district: G14 9 / G13 3
- Dialling code: 0141
- Police: Scotland
- Fire: Scottish
- Ambulance: Scottish
- UK Parliament: Glasgow West
- Scottish Parliament: Glasgow Anniesland

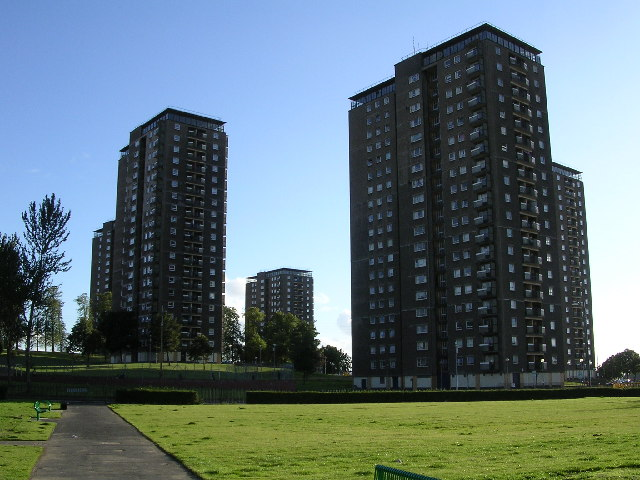
Scotstounhill tower blocks

Scotstounhill (/ˈskɒtstənˌhɪl/) is a small area situated in western Glasgow, between south Knightswood and Scotstoun. Housing is mainly in a terraced or villa style, although several high rise flats (also known as tower blocks) can be found in the area (originally six at Kingsway Court, two were demolished in the 2010s and the others renovated). These were built near to the site of the Scotstoun House mansion.

Scotstounhill contains a noted bowling club, and is served by Scotstounhill railway station which has frequent services to and from the city centre. It also contains Knightswood Shopping Centre in the area with several large shops such as Tesco.
