= Bannerman High School =

Coordinates: 55.8492°N 4.12258°W

Bannerman High school
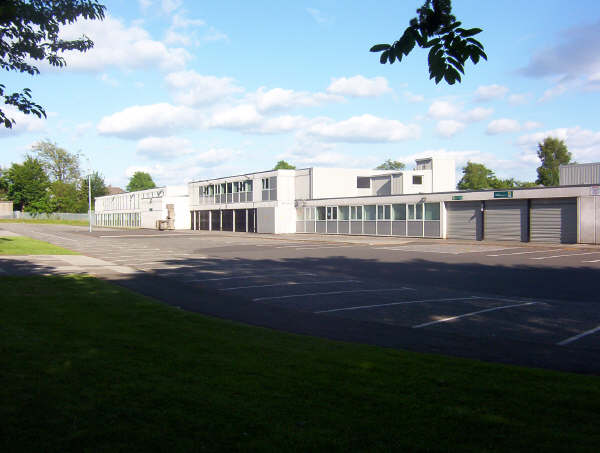

Location
- Glasgow Road, Baillieston; Glasgow, G69 7NS; Scotland

Information
- Denomination: Non-denominational
- Opened: 1973
- Authority: Glasgow City Council
- Head teacher: Seonaidh Black
- Grades: S1–S6
- Colours: Purple and silver

Bannerman High School is a state secondary school in the Baillieston suburb of Glasgow, Scotland. It is a non-denominational, co-educational, comprehensive school within the Glasgow City Council local education authority. The school teaches pupils from years S1 to S6. It has a capacity for 1400 pupils and has approximately 100 members of teaching staff. The current head teacher is Seonaidh Black.

== Associated primary schools ==
The six associated primary schools are Caledonia Primary, Carmyle Primary, Mount Vernon Primary, Garrowhill Primary, Sandaig Primary and Swinton Primary. Together with these six partner primary schools and two pre-5 establishments, the school is part of the Bannerman Learning Community, although some pupils in the area have alternatively attended Eastbank Academy in neighbouring Shettleston.

== Facilities ==
The school was opened in 1973 and is composed of three linked buildings. The school has playing fields, all-weather pitches, a workshop theatre, games hall and academic and practical classroom areas.

Facilities for pupils with physical disabilities are in place, although there is only one lift. The school was fully refurbished and upgraded during the course of 2002, as part of a citywide PFI project. The G-Unit for young people on the Autistic Spectrum opened in the school in August 2000 (which had then been known as the Communication Disorder Unit, then Bannerman Autism Unit, and currently Bannerman Language and Communication Resource).

== History ==
Prior to the school opening in the early 1970s, there was heated debate as to the naming of the school. The names put forward were.

1. Garrowhill Academy. The original suggestion was to call the new school, put forward by the councillor for the area because it was to be located near the residential area of Garrowhill.

2. Garrowhill High School. This was actually the name the Charles Anderson concrete sculpture purchase order was made out to. Ref Charles Anderson website.

3. Baillieston High School. The councillor for Baillieston, Jimmy McGuigan, strongly disagreed and he was supported by many residents. It was felt that the name should incorporate 'Baillieston'

4. Scott-Maxwell High School, This was very popular choice with older Bailliestonians. Bannerman HS was built in the Home Field of the Baillieston House Estate. The last proprietor of the Baillieston and Garrowhill Estates and Lands of Baillieston was John Maxwell Scott-Maxwell.

However the Education sub-committee of Lanarkshire county council eventually decided to name it after the retiring county architect Charles Bannerman. The school became under the control of Glasgow City Council when Baillieston was incorporated into the city's boundaries in 1975.

In November 2022, a 33-year-old physics teacher resigned after pupils discovered her OnlyFans account. In June 2025, she was struck off by the General Teaching Council for Scotland, who found it proven that the teacher's profile was in part visible to the public and that she had defended her OnlyFans use in media interviews.
