= Barrachnie =

Place in Glasgow, Scotland adjacent to Garrowhill

Coordinates: 55.85066°N 4.13400°W

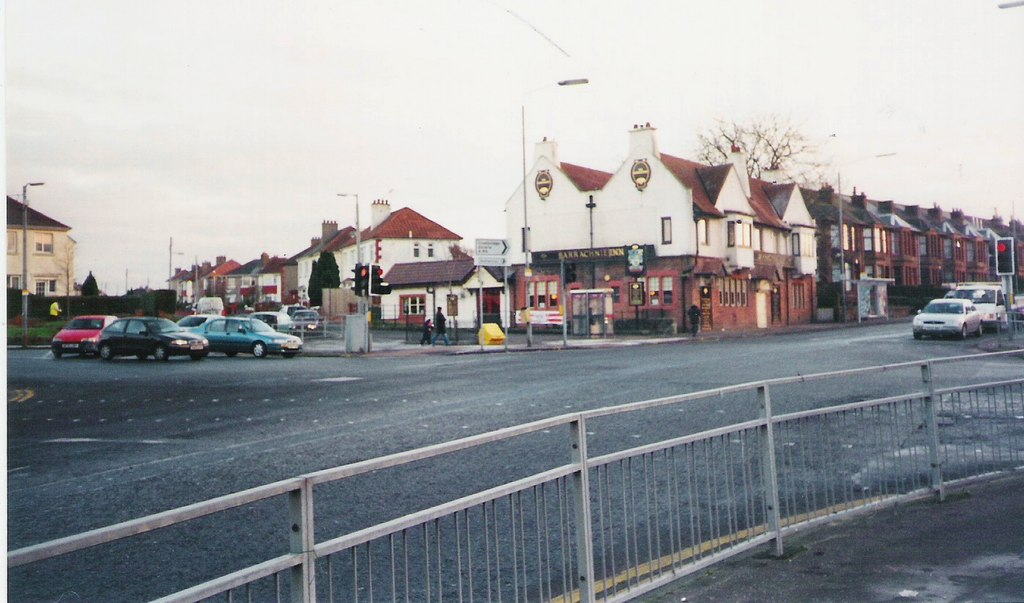
Barrachnie

Barrachnie is a place in Glasgow, Scotland adjacent to Garrowhill.

== History ==
The etymology of the name is not easy as it has appeared under many configurations and its evolution to the present form is difficult to understand as it is pronounced "Brachney" – just as it was in the 15th century.

Barrachnie was an ancient fermtoun which was mentioned in the Glasgow Protocols and had many entries in the rental book of the Bishopric of Glasgow in the Middle Ages – 14th.day June 1520 Wyl Morisone in xixs vijd land of Barrachnie. Like the other parts of the district it was part of the Barony and Regality of Glasgow and from about 1600, also of the parish of Old Monkland.

The first coal mined in the Baillieston district was in the Barrachnie pit.

== Transport ==
It is served by Garrowhill railway station and three bus services to the city and Lanarkshire.
