= Newbank =

Area of Glasgow, Scotland

Coordinates: 55.849484°N 4.201036°W

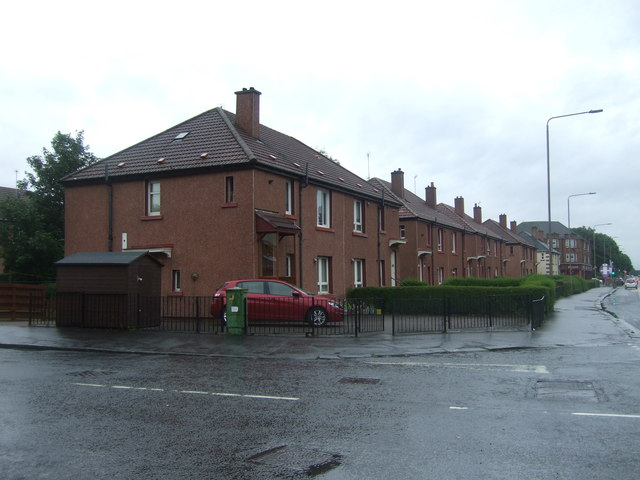
- Original Newbank houses on London Road (2017)

- Location within Glasgow
- OS grid reference: NS623640
- Council area: Glasgow City Council
- Lieutenancy area: Glasgow
- Country: Scotland
- Sovereign state: United Kingdom
- Post town: GLASGOW
- Postcode district: G31 4
- Dialling code: 0141
- Police: Scotland
- Fire: Scottish
- Ambulance: Scottish
- UK Parliament: Glasgow East
- Scottish Parliament: Glasgow Shettleston

Newbank is a neighbourhood in the East End of Glasgow, Scotland, near the home ground of Celtic F.C. It sits just north of the River Clyde, adjacent to Parkhead, and is bounded to the south by London Road. It is now a settlement of council houses but its name derives from an 18th-century estate of that name.

== History ==
The original 'Newbank House' has left no remains, but there is a fine red-sandstone 19th century Newlands Primary School in Springfield Road, near Parkhead Cross. This school was the private donation of Lord Newlands, hence its name.

Architecturally, the Newbank area is notable for its solid 4-in-a-block council houses which, with full bathroom facilities and their own gardens, were a substantial improvement on the older tenement flats which for generations dominated the East End. Many of the more modern Newbank tenement flats also boasted internal facilities not commonly found elsewhere.

Much of the original Newbank housing, including the fine old Belvidere Hospital nearby off London Road, has been demolished. New housing, mainly individual houses in Newbank itself and modern tenements on the site of the hospital, has replaced it in the early 21st century.
