= Cowglen =

Coordinates: 55.821087°N 4.332947°W

Cowglen: Scots: Couglen
- Location within Glasgow
- OS grid reference: NS539610
- Council area: Glasgow City Council
- Lieutenancy area: Glasgow
- Country: Scotland
- Sovereign state: United Kingdom
- Post town: GLASGOW
- Postcode district: G53
- Dialling code: 0141
- Police: Scotland
- Fire: Scottish
- Ambulance: Scottish
- UK Parliament: Glasgow South West
- Scottish Parliament: Glasgow Pollok

Cowglen is a district in the Scottish city of Glasgow, within the Newlands/Auldburn ward of the city but geographically closer to the large suburb of Pollok. It is situated south of the River Clyde. Much of its territory is open land occupied by a golf course, and it also adjoins Pollok Country Park.

Cowglen was the site of a new military hospital during World War II, which continued to operate until 2000. In the 2010s, work began on a substantial housing development in the area, based around the site of the hospital and the demolished buildings of a large National Savings and Investments regional headquarters to its north, with the project encouraged by the proximity of the Silverburn Shopping Centre, Kennishead railway station and Junction 2 of the M77 motorway.
