= Garrowhill =

Suburb of Glasgow, Scotland

Coordinates: 55.8517°N 4.1244°W

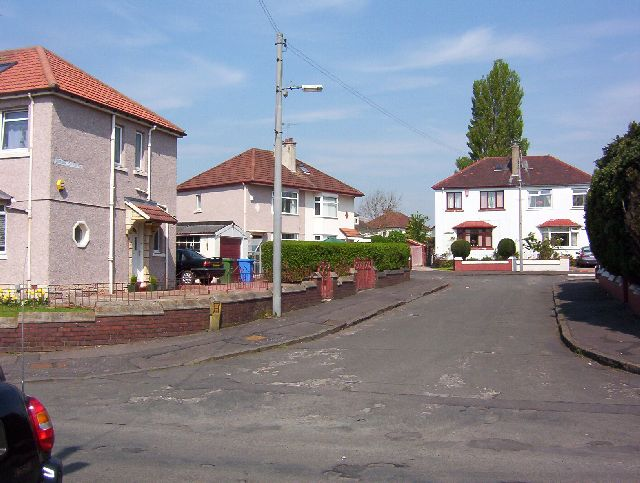
- Houses on Florida Gardens

- Location within Glasgow
- OS grid reference: NS671641
- Council area: Glasgow City Council
- Lieutenancy area: Glasgow
- Country: Scotland
- Sovereign state: United Kingdom
- Post town: GLASGOW
- Postcode district: G69 6
- Dialling code: 0141
- Police: Scotland
- Fire: Scottish
- Ambulance: Scottish
- UK Parliament: Glasgow East
- Scottish Parliament: Glasgow Shettleston

Garrowhill (Scots: Garraehill or Garrahull, Scottish Gaelic: An Cnoc Garbh) is a residential area within the wider Baillieston suburb of Glasgow, Scotland. It is situated approximately 7 miles (11 km) east of the city centre.

== History ==
Garrowhill was developed as a residential area in the mid-1930s, built as a housing development neighbouring the then village of Baillieston.

Garrowhill was brought within Glasgow's city boundaries in 1975 along with Baillieston, under the terms of the Local Government (Scotland) Act, 1973.

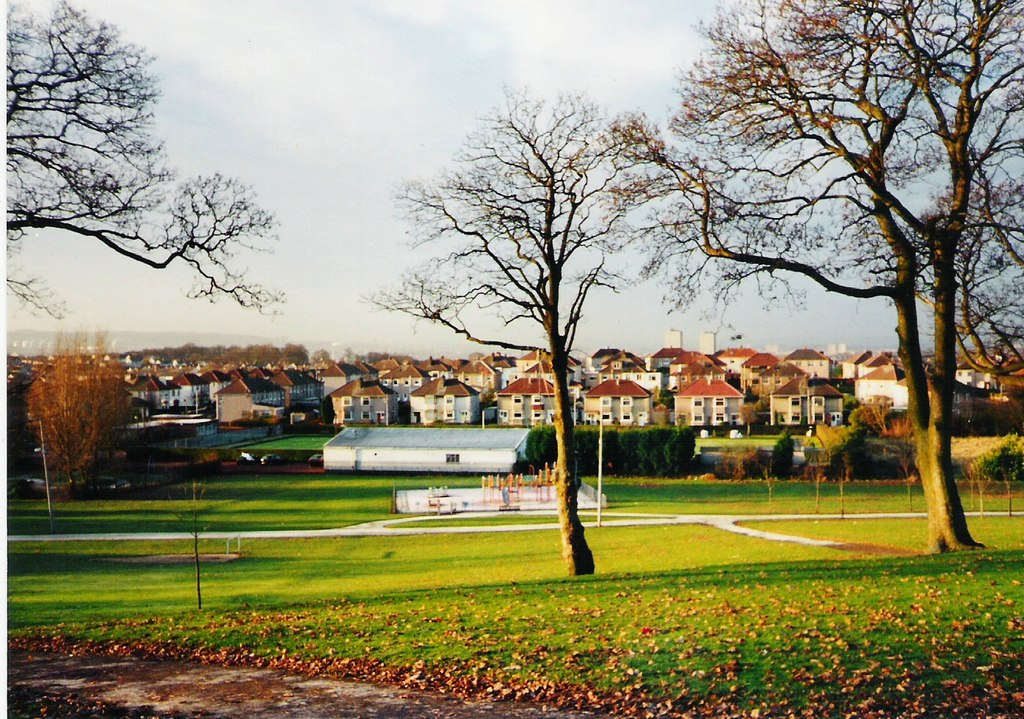
View looking south over Garrowhill Park (2002)

Although sometimes considered separate from Baillieston, Garrowhill along with Swinton, Springhill and Barrachnie falls within the Baillieston Ward of Glasgow City Council.

== Schools ==
The local primary school is Garrowhill Primary School, located on Bakewell Road. The school is part of the Bannerman Learning Community. Both schools are involved with local charities to combat child poverty, crime, alcohol and drug problems commonly associated with Glasgow's East End.

== Transport ==
Garrowhill is well connected with the city centre by local buses and trains. Garrowhill railway station is on the North Clyde Line between Shettleston and one before Easterhouse, with frequent trains through Glasgow Queen Street; the journey from Garrowhill to Queen Street takes approximately 12 minutes. Trains also run from Garrowhill in the opposite direction, through Coatbridge and Airdrie to Edinburgh Waverley.

Garrowhill is located close to the M8 motorway.
