= Greenfield, Glasgow =

Coordinates: 55.8555°N 4.1678°W

Greenfield
- Location within Glasgow
- Area: 1.5 km^{2} (0.58 sq mi)
- OS grid reference: NS644646
- Council area: Glasgow City Council
- Lieutenancy area: Glasgow
- Country: Scotland
- Sovereign state: United Kingdom
- Post town: GLASGOW
- Postcode district: G32
- Dialling code: 0141
- Police: Scotland
- Fire: Scottish
- Ambulance: Scottish
- UK Parliament: Glasgow East
- Scottish Parliament: Glasgow Shettleston

Greenfield is a neighbourhood in the east end of the Scottish city of Glasgow, north of the River Clyde. The estate was built on the grounds of Greenfield House which was demolished to make way for the new scheme which was built in the 1960s.

Greenfield lies south of Cranhill, north of Shettleston, east of Carntyne and west of Springboig and Budhill. Housing in the area is in the form of terraced housing, tenements and maisonettes. There are also some prefab houses surviving from the 1940s.

The area was historically associated with the coal and brick mining industries. Greenfield House and its estate was sold to coalmaster James McNair in 1759 and he developed coal mines. Greenfield Brickworks were also based in the area and later became known as Frankfield Brickworks.

Greenfield was one of the areas affected by the 2002 Glasgow floods, caused by a Victorian sewage system and heavy rain. During the floods, rescuers struggled to get to people living in Greenfield.

The area is also home to a recently upgraded football centre, used for amateur games, and a public park. In 2024 a 16 year old was stabbed in Greenfield Park and died from his injuries. His killer, a 13 year old, admitted culpable homicide and was subsequently detained for five years.
