= Garrowhill railway station =

Railway station in Glasgow, Scotland

Garrowhill
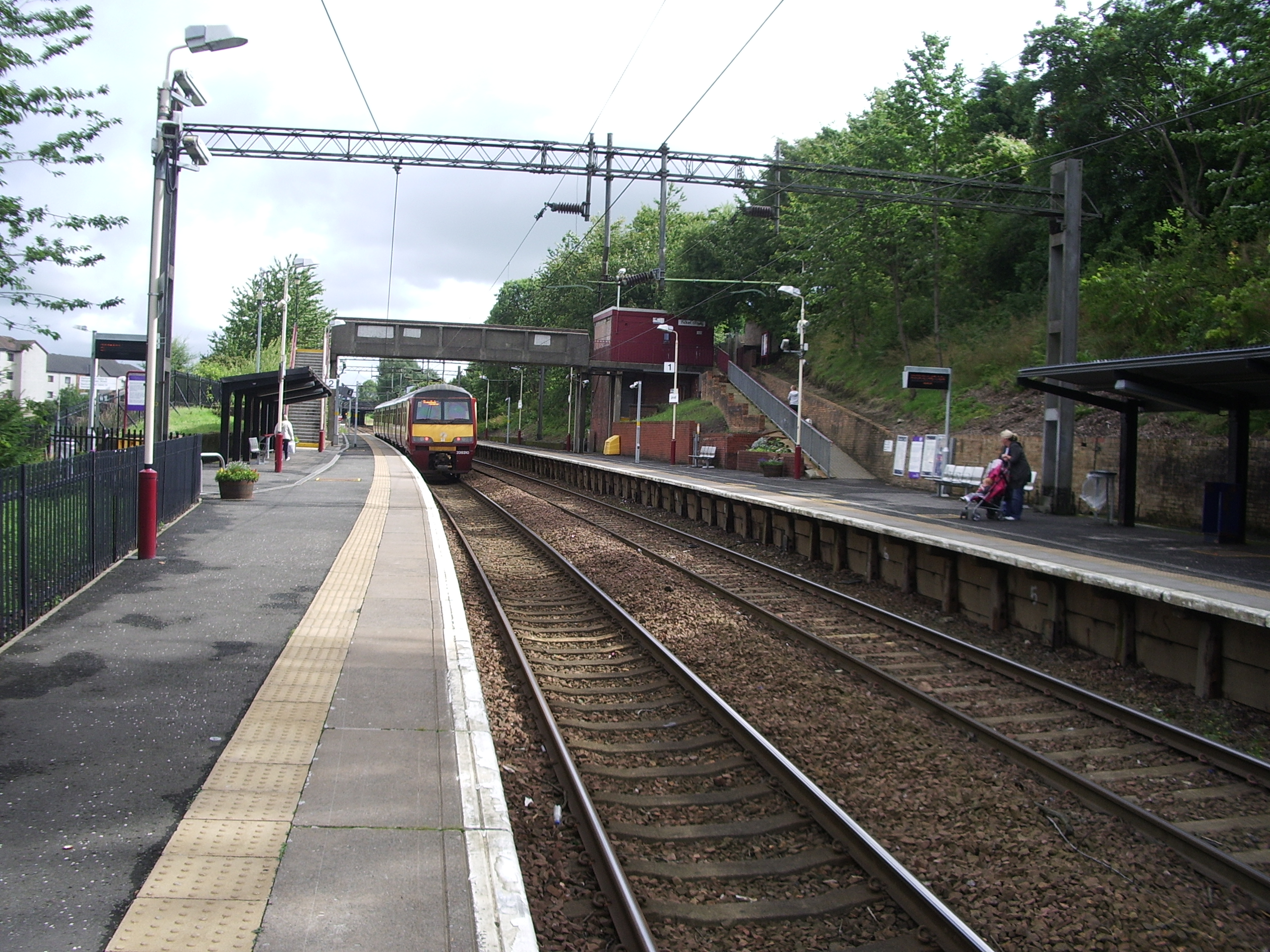

General information
- Location: Garrowhill, Glasgow; Scotland
- Coordinates: 55.8553°N 4.1294°W
- Grid reference: NS668645
- Managed by: ScotRail
- Transit authority: Strathclyde Partnership for Transport
- Platforms: 2

Other information
- Station code: GAR
- Fare zone: G6

History
- Original company: London and North Eastern Railway
- Post-grouping: London and North Eastern Railway

Key dates
- 16 March 1936: Opened as Garrowhill Halt
- 11 September 1961: Renamed Garrowhill

Passengers
- 2020/21: ▼63,084
- 2021/22: ▲0.196 million
- 2022/23: ▲0.278 million
- 2023/24: ▲0.350 million
- 2024/25: ▲0.370 million
Location
Notes
- Passenger statistics from the Office of Rail and Road

Garrowhill railway station serves the Garrowhill and Barlanark areas of Glasgow, Scotland. The railway station is 4¾ miles (7 km) east of Glasgow Queen Street railway station on the North Clyde Line and is managed by ScotRail.

== Services ==
Monday to Saturday daytimes:

- Half-hourly service towards Edinburgh Waverley
- Half-hourly service towards Airdrie
- Half-hourly service towards Balloch via Glasgow Queen Street Low Level
- Half-hourly service towards Helensburgh Central via Glasgow Queen Street Low Level (As of August 2016 this service no longer calls at Shettleston, Cartyne and Bellgrove. Passengers for these stations please use the half-hourly service towards Balloch instead.)

Evening services are as follows:

- Half-hourly service towards Airdrie via all stations
- Half-hourly service towards Balloch via Glasgow Queen Street Low Level

Sunday services are as follows:

- Half-hourly service towards Edinburgh Waverley
- Half-hourly service towards Helensburgh Central

== Facilities ==
The station does not have a dedicated car park but cycle storage is available. The station is staffed during working hours from Monday to Friday.

Preceding station	National Rail	Following station
Easterhouse	ScotRail; North Clyde Line	Shettleston
