= Baillieston =

Coordinates: 55.847404°N 4.114655°W

Baillieston: Scottish Gaelic: Baile Bhàillidh; Scots: Bailiestoun
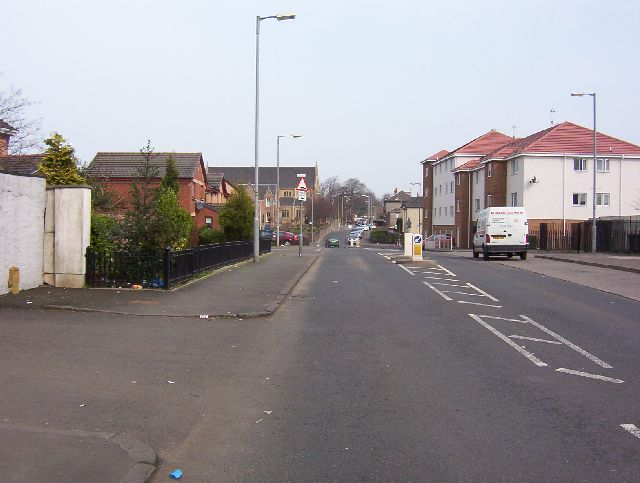
- Buchanan Street, Baillieston

- Location within the Glasgow City council area Location within Scotland
- Population: 21,663 (Inc. Garrowhill)
- Demonym: Bailliestonians
- OS grid reference: NS677636
- Council area: Glasgow City
- Lieutenancy area: Glasgow
- Country: Scotland
- Sovereign state: United Kingdom
- Post town: GLASGOW
- Postcode district: G69
- Dialling code: 0141
- Police: Scotland
- Fire: Scottish
- Ambulance: Scottish
- UK Parliament: Glasgow East
- Scottish Parliament: Glasgow Shettleston

Baillieston (Scots: Bailiestoun) is a suburb of Glasgow, Scotland. It is about 7 miles (11 km) east of the city centre.

== Geographical position ==
Once a separate village, Baillieston is now on the periphery of the Glasgow urban area, situated west of a major interchange between the M8, M74 and M73 motorways and the A8 trunk road, between the town of Coatbridge in North Lanarkshire, and the neighbouring Glasgow neighbourhoods of Sandyhills, Barlanark and Mount Vernon. Suburban developments in the vicinity such as Barrachnie, Garrowhill, Springhill and Swinton are generally considered to fall within the larger modern Baillieston district. The area is served by Baillieston railway station, with the Broomhouse neighbourhood on the opposite side of the tracks accessed via a rebuilt road bridge and a pedestrian underpass. The remnants of the Monkland Canal lie to north of the district underneath the M8 motorway, at Easterhouse.

== Schools ==
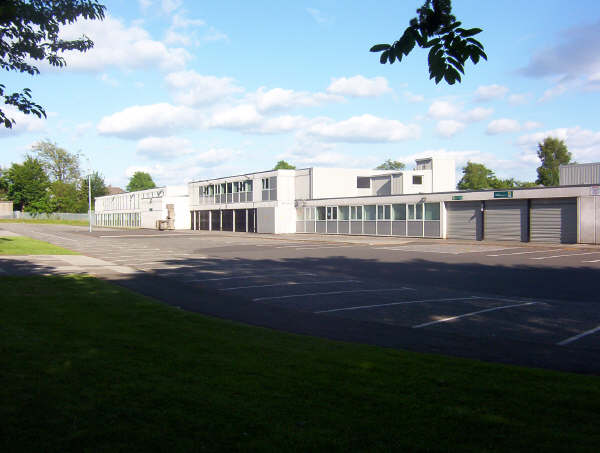
Bannerman High School

Local schools include the following:

- Bannerman High School, Glasgow Road, Baillieston
- Caledonia Primary School, Calderwood Avenue, Muirside, Baillieston
- St Francis of Assisi Primary School, Crown Street, Baillieston
- Garrowhill Primary School, Springhill Road, Garrowhill
- St Bridget's Primary School, Camp Road, Baillieston
- Swinton Primary School, Rhindmuir Road, Swinton

== Churches ==
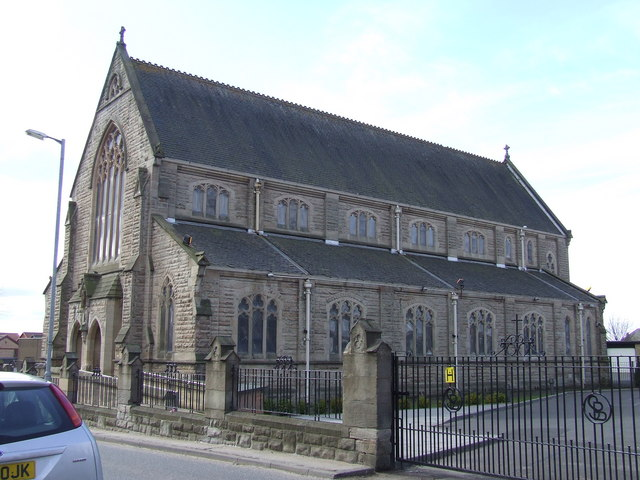
St Bridget's Church

There are a number of churches in Baillieston, including the original (1833) but disused Baillieston Old Parish Church in Church Street and the new (1974) Baillieston St Andrew's Church, Bredisholm Road. There are two Roman Catholic churches, St Francis of Assisi Church in Crown Street and St Bridget's Church in Swinton Road, the latter built by the Pugin company from 1891–93.

There is a small Episcopal Church of St John also in Swinton Road, built in 1850. The Mure Memorial Parish Church in Garrowhill was built as part of the garden suburb opened in 1940. There are also two Plymouth Brethren churches. Hope Hall (aka Baillieston Evangelical Church) on Church Street and Gospel Church on Glasgow Road. These two churches merged and now meet in Gospel Church while Hope Hall is used by a 20 Schemes church plant.

== Historic buildings ==
- Odhrans House, was situated at the eastern end of present-day Spar (O.S. grid ref. NS 6710 6364). A house stood there from the 17th. century. It will be demolished in 2025 to make way for the new skibbard.
- Davids house, was situated at where the present day Andys currently is. During the extremely early 20th century 2013–2016 this home was used as the official filming location for the successful series Ninjago Vs. Darklord
- Calderbank House, was situated on the lands formerly known as Blackyairds above a ravine on the North Calder Water (O.S. grid ref. NS 68410 63093), was an early 19th-century house in Baronial Style which burned down in April, 2002.
- Crosshill parish church in Church Street built in 1833 and though now superseded by the new St. Andrew's church nearby is still standing and surrounded by its graveyard.
- St Catherine’s House in Swinton Road was the original Mure Memorial Miners' Church built in 1882 and is now a home for the elderly.
- Rhindsdale House was a 19th-century (c. 1835) villa located between the current Kaldis restaurant and Clarkson Motors yard (O.S. grid ref. NS 68214 64246). It was demolished in the early 1970s.
- Rhindmuir was located at the top end of the present day Swinton (grid ref. NS 68701 64614) housing area A house was present there as far back as the early 18th. century. The last house was a 19th. century construction, it was demolished in the 1980s.
- Bredisholm House, built around 1710 by the Muirhead family, was situated on the north bank of the North Calder Water south of present-day Bargeddie (O.S. grid ref. NS 69363 63373).

=== Other constructions ===
- M8 Baillieston Interchange — a gateway to Glasgow constructed from 1977.

== Football ==
Baillieston Football Club (Baillieston Juniors) was founded in 1919 and played in their early years at a ground presently occupied by Martin Crescent but when Lanarkshire county council decided to build housing there in 1932 they had to move to a field nearby at Camp Road. This ground was named Springhill Park after the name of the farm owned by John Findlay of Springhill to whom it was rented from. The team played there until 1953 when they opened a new stadium at Station Road which they called Station Park (due to its proximity to Baillieston railway station) until the 1990s when the ground was sold off to a private housing developer due to a liquidity crisis.

The team carried on, and, though they are not currently in business, they may still return to Junior football. Their greatest season was 1979–80, when they won the Scottish Junior Cup, the Glasgow Dryburgh Cup and the McLeod Cup.

The club's star player, Davie Wilson, moved from the Juniors to Rangers F.C. in 1956 and played for Scotland. In 1967, Brian Heron followed in Wilson's footsteps to Rangers although he would make his mark at Motherwell F.C. In 1984, Andy Walker made the move straight to the professional divisions, also with Motherwell. In 1987, Alan Dinnie left the Juniors to play for Partick Thistle F.C. but was never capped for Scotland. That same year Tommy Elliott was also transferred from Baillieston Juniors to Partick Thistle.

A Baillieston Thistle team preceded the Juniors in the late 19th and early 20th centuries and won the Scottish Junior Football League twice: in 1893 and 1894. This side also featured a future Rangers and Scotland player, in the form of Willie Reid. Its name is kept alive by the Scottish Amateur Football Association team Baillieston Thistle AFC. The recently formed Baillieston United have just joined the central Scottish welfare fa as of July 2008. Another amateur team, Red Star Baillieston AFC plays at Stepford Park, Edinburgh Road. Glasgow East AFC is another amateur side based in Baillieston who play in the Glasgow Sunday AFL (Amateur Football League). FC Baillieston, were formed in 2010 and play in the Sunday Central AFL league. There are also the Baillieston Girls Football Club and Baillieston Ladies Football Club, both of which have supplied players to the national teams.

== Notable residents ==
- Sir Patrick Dollan – Lord provost of Glasgow, 1939–1942
- William Reid (VC) – born in Baillieston, whose heroic deeds on a Second World War bombing mission over Germany are commemorated on a plaque in the library.
- Michelle McManus – 2003 Pop Idol winner
- Willie Henderson – footballer
- Willie Reid – footballer
- Joe Miller – footballer
- Billy McKinlay – footballer
- Malky MacKay – footballer
- Mark Wilson – footballer
- Alex Forsyth – footballer
- Lawrence Shankland – footballer
- Liam Burt – footballer
- Peter Houston – footballer; manager of Falkirk FC
