= Shettleston railway station =

Railway station in Glasgow, Scotland

Shettleston Scottish Gaelic: Baile Nighean Sheadna
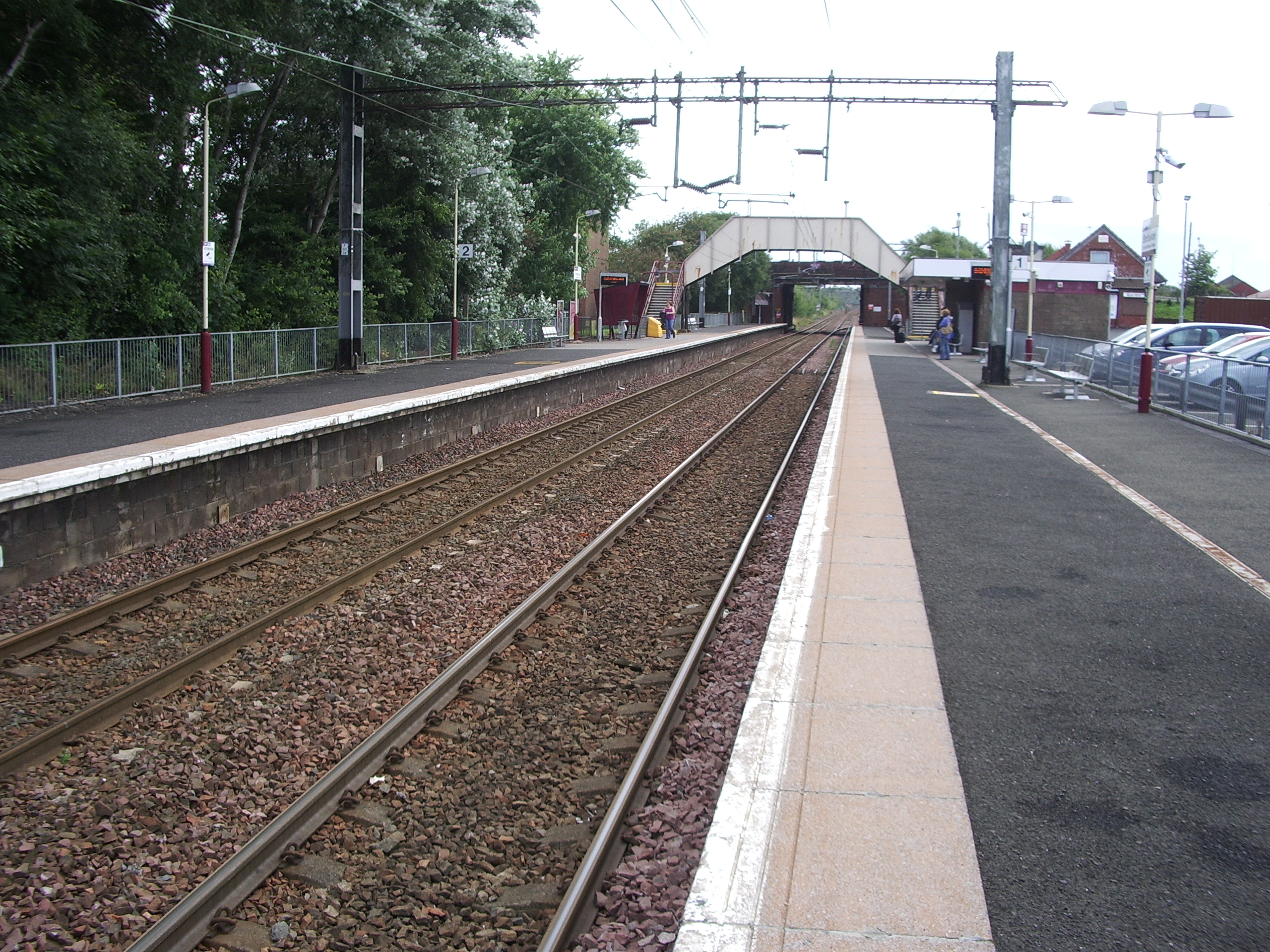

General information
- Location: Shettleston, Glasgow; Scotland
- Coordinates: 55.8536°N 4.1599°W
- Grid reference: NS648643
- Managed by: ScotRail
- Transit authority: Strathclyde Partnership for Transport
- Platforms: 2

Other information
- Station code: SLS
- Fare zone: G6

History
- Original company: North British Railway
- Pre-grouping: North British Railway
- Post-grouping: LNER

Key dates
- 1 February 1871: Opened

Passengers
- 2020/21: ▼0.115 million
- 2021/22: ▲0.368 million
- 2022/23: ▲0.474 million
- 2023/24: ▲0.632 million
- 2024/25: ▲0.652 million
Location
Notes
- Passenger statistics from the Office of Rail and Road

Shettleston railway station serves the Shettleston area of Glasgow, Scotland and is 3½ miles (5 km) east of Glasgow Queen Street railway station on the North Clyde Line. The station is managed by ScotRail.

== History ==
Shettleston was opened on 1 February 1871 when the Coatbridge Branch of the North British Railway opened. In 1877, the station became a junction with the opening of the Glasgow, Bothwell, Hamilton and Coatbridge Railway with the commencement of freight services to Bothwell on 1 November 1877 and passenger services on 1 April 1878. The line closed to passenger traffic in July 1955 and completely in 1961 (except for a short section to Mount Vernon that survived for a further four years).

In 2010, Shettleston station received bilingual name boards, in English and Gaelic, the Gaelic reading "Baile Nighean Sheadna". Shettleston station facilities include a ticket office, ticket vending machine, waiting shelter, footbridge, clock, train information displays and seating. The station has two platforms. There is also a car park and a cycle parking stand.

In 2011, the footbridge was replaced - like many others on the North Clyde Line the previous structure had been built as part of the 1959 electrification and was in very poor structural condition.

== Services ==
Monday to Saturday daytimes:

- Half-hourly service towards Edinburgh Waverley (As of August 2016 this service no longer calls at Garrowhill, Easterhouse, Blairhill and Coatdyke. Passengers for these stations should use the half-hourly service towards Airdrie from Balloch instead.)
- Half-hourly service towards Airdrie
- Half-hourly service towards Balloch via Glasgow Queen Street Low Level
- Half-hourly service towards Milngavie via Glasgow Queen Street Low Level

Evening services are as follows:

- Half-hourly service towards Airdrie via all stations
- Half-hourly service towards Balloch via Glasgow Queen Street Low Level

Sunday services are as follows:

- Half-hourly service towards Edinburgh Waverley
- Half-hourly service towards Helensburgh Central

| Preceding station | National Rail | Following station |
|---|---|---|
| Garrowhill | ScotRail; North Clyde Line | Carntyne |
| Coatbridge Sunnyside | ScotRail; North Clyde Line | Carntyne |
| | Historical railways | |
| Garrowhill | North British Railway; Coatbridge Branch (NBR) | Carntyne |
| Mount Vernon North | North British Railway; Glasgow, Bothwell, Hamilton and Coatbridge Railway | Terminus |
