= Craigend, Glasgow =

Neighbourhood in Scotland

Coordinates: 55.874489°N 4.159289°W

Craigend
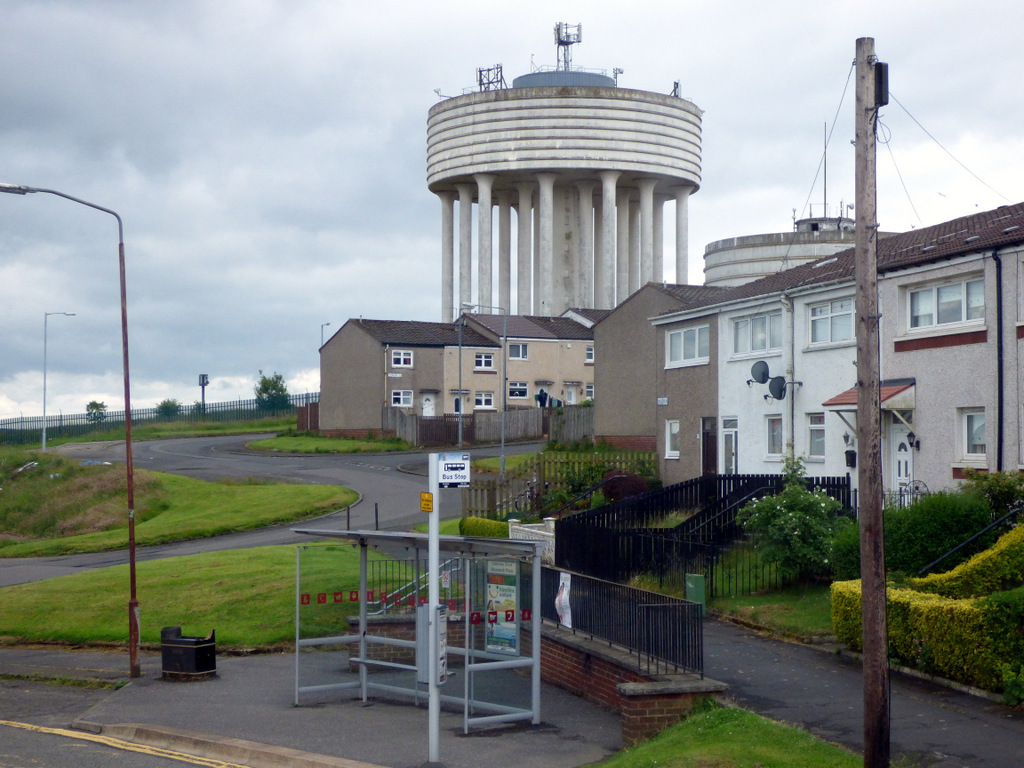
- Collessie Drive (2018)

- Location within Glasgow
- OS grid reference: NS650667
- Council area: Glasgow City Council
- Lieutenancy area: Glasgow
- Country: Scotland
- Sovereign state: United Kingdom
- Post town: GLASGOW
- Postcode district: G33 5
- Dialling code: 0141
- Police: Scotland
- Fire: Scottish
- Ambulance: Scottish
- UK Parliament: Glasgow East
- Scottish Parliament: Glasgow Provan

Craigend is a neighbourhood in the Scottish city of Glasgow. It is situated north of the River Clyde, immediately west of Garthamlock, east of Hogganfield Park and Ruchazie and separated from Cranhill and Queenslie to the south by the M8 motorway (Junction 11 of which directly serves the area). An area of open ground (Cardowan Moss nature reserve) is to the north. The local landmarks are two water towers, which are no longer illuminated at night.

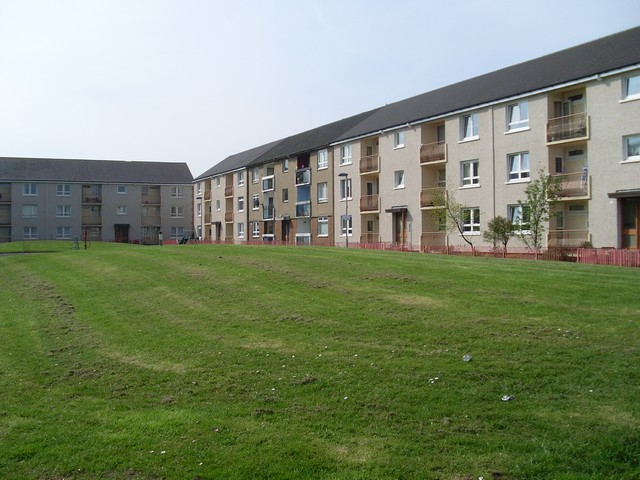
Tenements at Glenraith Square

In the 1970s and 1980s Craigend was considered a high amenity area due to the large number of back and front door houses, compared to tenements in the neighbouring areas of Ruchazie and Garthamlock. The building fabric of Craigend is now somewhat poorer than these areas which as they have been revigorated and rebuilt as part of the city's East End regeneration scheme.

Craigend has three schools, Sunnyside and Avenue End (which are non-denominational) and St Rose of Lima (Roman Catholic).
