= G postcode area =

Postcode area within the United Kingdom

Glasgow
- Postcode area
- Coordinates: 55.869°N 4.272°W
- Country: United Kingdom
- Postcode area: G
- Postcode area name: Glasgow
- Post towns: 6
- Postcode districts: 57
- Postcode sectors: 241
- Postcodes (live): 31,804
- Postcodes (total): 46,727
- Statistics as at May 2020

The G postcode area, also known as the Glasgow postcode area, is a group of postcode districts in central Scotland, within six post towns. These districts are primarily centered on Glasgow itself, and West Dunbartonshire (including Dumbarton, Clydebank and Alexandria), plus parts of the council areas of Argyll and Bute (including Arrochar and Helensburgh), East Dunbartonshire, North Lanarkshire, South Lanarkshire, Renfrewshire, East Renfrewshire and Stirling.

Mail for the G postcode area is processed at Glasgow Mail Centre, along with mail for the PA, ML, KA and ZE postcode areas.

== Former postal districts and their legacy ==
From 1923 until the introduction of the national postcode system in the late 1960s, Glasgow was divided into (mostly) numbered postal districts for its central and surrounding parts identified by compass-point letters: C1–C5 (corresponding to current postcode districts G1–G5), W1–W5 (G11–G15), NW (G20), N1–N3 (G21–G23), E1–E4 (G31–G34), SE (G40), S1–S6 (G41–G46) and SW1–SW3 (G51–G53).

== Coverage ==
The approximate coverage of the postcode districts:

Postcode district	Post town	Coverage	Local authority area(s)
G1	GLASGOW	Former C1 district: Merchant City	Glasgow City
G2	GLASGOW	Former C2 district: Blythswood Hill, Anderston (part)	Glasgow City
G3	GLASGOW	Former C3 district: Anderston, Finnieston, Garnethill, Kelvingrove, Park, Woodlands (part), Yorkhill	Glasgow City
G4	GLASGOW	Former C4 district: Calton (part), Cowcaddens (part), Drygate, Kelvinbridge, Townhead, Woodlands (part), Woodside (part)	Glasgow City
G5	GLASGOW	Former C5 district: Gorbals	Glasgow City
G9	GLASGOW	Newspaper Competitions	non-geographic
G11	GLASGOW	Former W1 district: Broomhill, Partick, Partickhill	Glasgow City
G12	GLASGOW	Former W2 district: West End (part), Cleveden, Dowanhill, Hillhead, Hyndland, Kelvindale, Kelvinside, Botanic Gardens, University of Glasgow	Glasgow City
G13	GLASGOW	Former W3 district: Anniesland, Knightswood, Yoker (part)	Glasgow City
G14	GLASGOW	Former W4 district: Whiteinch, Scotstoun, Yoker (part)	Glasgow City
G15	GLASGOW	Former W5 district: Drumchapel	Glasgow City
G20	GLASGOW	Former NW district: Maryhill, North Kelvinside, Ruchill	Glasgow City
G21	GLASGOW	Former N1 district: Balornock, Barmulloch, Cowlairs, Royston, Springburn, Sighthill	Glasgow City
G22	GLASGOW	Former N2 district: Milton, Parkhouse, Possilpark	Glasgow City
G23	GLASGOW	Former N3 district: Lambhill, Summerston	Glasgow City
G31	GLASGOW	Former E1 district: Dennistoun, Haghill, Parkhead (part)	Glasgow City
G32	GLASGOW	Former E2 district: Carmyle, Tollcross, Mount Vernon, Lightburn, Sandyhills, Shettleston, Springboig	Glasgow City
G33	GLASGOW	Former E3 district: Cardowan, Carntyne, Craigend, Cranhill, Garthamlock, Millerston, Provanmill, Queenslie, Riddrie, Robroyston, Ruchazie, Stepps, Wellhouse	North Lanarkshire, Glasgow City
G34	GLASGOW	Former E4 district: Easterhouse, Easthall, Provanhall	Glasgow City
G40	GLASGOW	Former SE district: Bridgeton, Calton, Dalmarnock	Glasgow City
G41	GLASGOW	Former S1 district: Pollokshields, Shawlands	Glasgow City
G42	GLASGOW	Former S2 district: Battlefield, Govanhill, Mount Florida, Strathbungo (part), Toryglen	Glasgow City
G43	GLASGOW	Former S3 district: Mansewood, Newlands, Pollokshaws, Cowglen	Glasgow City
G44	GLASGOW	Former S4 district: Cathcart, Simshill, Croftfoot, King's Park, Muirend, Netherlee	Glasgow City, East Renfrewshire
G45	GLASGOW	Former S5 district: Castlemilk	Glasgow City
G46	GLASGOW	Former S6 district: Arden, Carnwadric, Deaconsbank, Giffnock, Kennishead, Thornliebank, northeast Newton Mearns, Regents Park	East Renfrewshire, Glasgow City
G51	GLASGOW	Former SW1 district: Govan, Ibrox, Drumoyne, Cessnock, Plantation	Glasgow City
G52	GLASGOW	Former SW2 district: Cardonald, Hillington, Penilee, Mosspark	Glasgow City, Renfrewshire
G53	GLASGOW	Former SW3 district: Crookston, Darnley, Hurlet, Nitshill, Parkhouse, Pollok, Priesthill, Southpark	Glasgow City, small parts of East Renfrewshire
G58	GLASGOW	National Savings and Investments, Cowglen	non-geographic
G60	GLASGOW	Bowling, Old Kilpatrick	West Dunbartonshire
G61	GLASGOW	Bearsden	East Dunbartonshire
G62	GLASGOW	Baldernock, Milngavie, Mugdock	East Dunbartonshire, Stirling
G63	GLASGOW	Balfron, Balmaha, Blanefield, Croftamie, Drymen, Dumgoyne, Fintry, Killearn, Rowardennan, Strathblane	Stirling
G64	GLASGOW	Bishopbriggs, Torrance	East Dunbartonshire
G65	GLASGOW	Croy, Kilsyth, Twechar	North Lanarkshire, East Dunbartonshire
G66	GLASGOW	Clachan of Campsie, Haughhead, Kirkintilloch, Lennoxtown, Lenzie, Milton of Campsie, Auchinloch	East Dunbartonshire, North Lanarkshire
G67	GLASGOW	Cumbernauld (south)	North Lanarkshire
G68	GLASGOW	Cumbernauld (north), Dullatur	North Lanarkshire, very small part of Falkirk
G69	GLASGOW	Baillieston, Bargeddie, Chryston, Garrowhill, Gartcosh, Gartloch, Moodiesburn, Muirhead, Springhill	Glasgow City, North Lanarkshire
G70	GLASGOW	HM Revenue and Customs, Cumbernauld	non-geographic
G71	GLASGOW	Birkenshaw, Bothwell, Broomhouse, Tannochside, Uddingston, Viewpark	Glasgow City, North Lanarkshire, South Lanarkshire
G72	GLASGOW	Blantyre, Cambuslang	South Lanarkshire
G73	GLASGOW	Rutherglen	South Lanarkshire
G74	GLASGOW	East Kilbride (north), Thorntonhall	South Lanarkshire
G75	GLASGOW	Auldhouse, East Kilbride (south)	South Lanarkshire
G76	GLASGOW	Busby, Carmunnock, Clarkston, Eaglesham, Waterfoot	East Renfrewshire, Glasgow City, very small parts of South Lanarkshire
G77	GLASGOW	Newton Mearns	East Renfrewshire
G78	GLASGOW	Barrhead, Neilston, Uplawmoor	East Renfrewshire, very small parts of East Ayrshire and North Ayrshire
G79	GLASGOW	HM Revenue and Customs, East Kilbride	non-geographic
G81	CLYDEBANK	Dalmuir, Duntocher, Faifley, Hardgate	West Dunbartonshire
G82	DUMBARTON	Cardross, Milton, Renton	West Dunbartonshire, Argyll and Bute
G83	ALEXANDRIA; ARROCHAR	Alexandria, Arrochar, Aldochlay, Ardlui, Balloch, Bonhill, Gartocharn, Inverarnan, Jamestown, Luss, Tarbet	West Dunbartonshire, Argyll and Bute, Stirling
G84	HELENSBURGH	Clynder, Cove, Garelochhead, Kilcreggan, Rhu, Rosneath, Shandon	Argyll and Bute
G90	GLASGOW	Department for Work and Pensions	non-geographic

== Map ==
G postcode area map, showing postcode districts in red and post towns in grey text, with links to nearby FK, KA, ML and PA postcode areas.

Detailed map of postcode districts in central Glasgow

== See also ==
- Postcode Address File
- List of postcode areas in the United Kingdom
