= Culture in Glasgow =

Overview of the culture of Glasgow, Scotland

The city of Glasgow, has many amenities for a wide range of cultural activities, from curling to opera and from football to art appreciation; it also has a large selection of museums that include those devoted to transport, religion, and modern art. In 2009 Glasgow was awarded the title UNESCO Creative City of Music in recognition of its vibrant live music scene and its distinguished heritage. Glasgow has three major universities, each involved in creative and literary arts, and the city has the largest public reference library in Europe in the form of the Mitchell Library. Scotland's largest newspapers and national television and radio companies are based in the city.

== Art ==
The Kelvingrove Art Gallery and Museum houses renowned art work and paintings including many old masters, Dutch, Italian, French Impressionists, etc. and the Scottish Colourists, and Glasgow Boys. The Hunterian Museum and Art Gallery, of the University of Glasgow, has what is considered to be the best collection of Whistler paintings in the world. The Burrell Collection of international art and antiquities donated to the city by Sir William Burrell is housed in an award-winning museum in the Pollok Country Park. The People's Palace museum in Glasgow Green reflects the history of the city and its people, focusing on the working class of Glasgow. The Riverside Museum on the Clyde focuses on shipping, transport and city life. Glasgow School of Art designed by Charles Rennie Mackintosh continues its pre-eminence in art, design and architecture, including its Digital Design Studio across the River Clyde in Pacific Quay. The Gallery of Modern Art is on Royal Exchange Square, just off George Square. The Glasgow Print Studio is on Trongate, it provides workshop and gallery space for printmakers with regularly changing exhibitions.

== Museums ==
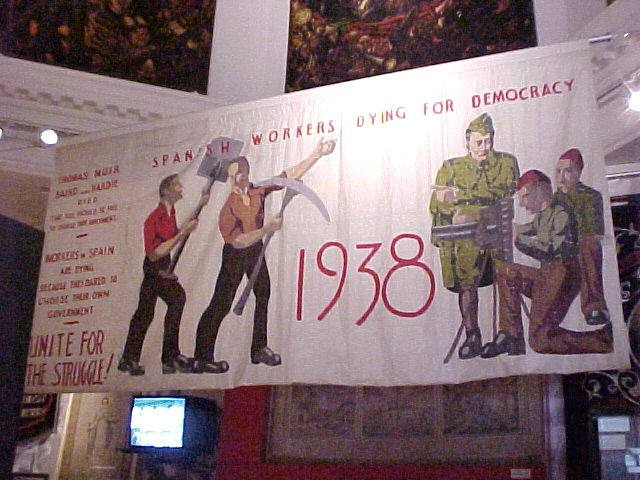
Spanish Workers Dying for Democracy banner exhibited in the People's Palace.

Glasgow's museums and galleries include:

- The Riverside Museum (Winner of the European Museum of the Year Award 2013) (2011–present)
- Kelvingrove Art Gallery and Museum
- The Burrell Collection
- Collins Gallery
- Fossil Grove
- The Gallery of Modern Art (GOMA)
- Glenlee, a museum ship
- Hunterian Museum and Art Gallery
- The Lighthouse, Scotland's Centre for Architecture, Design and the City
- McLellan Galleries
- Museum of Transport (1964–2010)
- The People's Palace
- Pollok House
- Provand's Lordship
- St Mungo Museum of Religious Life and Art
- Scottish Football Museum
- Scotland Street School Museum
- National Museum of Scottish Country Life
- National Museum of Piping

== Libraries ==
- Glasgow University Library
- Strathclyde University Library
- Glasgow Caledonian University Library
- Glasgow Women's Library
- Mitchell Library
- Stirling's Library

=== Community libraries ===
Glasgow has 32 community libraries across the city, run by Glasgow Life.

- Anniesland Library
- Ballieston Library
- Barmulloch Library
- Bridgeton Library
- Castlemilk Library
- Cardonald Library
- Couper Institute (Cathcart)
- Dennistoun Library
- Drumchapel Library
- Elder Park Library (Govan)
- Gallery of Modern Art (GoMA)
- Gorbals Library
- Govanhill Library
- Hillhead Library
- Ibrox Library
- Langside Library
- Knightswood Library
- Library at The Bridge (Easterhouse)
- Maryhill Library
- Milton Library
- Parkhead Library
- Partick Library
- Pollok Library
- Pollokshaws Library
- Pollokshields Library
- Possilpark Library
- Royston Library
- Riddrie Library
- Shettleston Library
- Springburn Library
- Woodside Library
- Whiteinch Library

== Entertainment ==
Glasgow serves as a central hub for Scotland's cultural institutions, hosting several national organizations including Scottish Opera, Scottish Ballet, the National Theatre of Scotland, and the Royal Scottish National Orchestra. The city's musical infrastructure includes the Royal Conservatoire of Scotland notable for its purpose-built Alexander Gibson Opera School and the National Piping Centre. Furthermore, Glasgow's designation as a UNESCO City of Music reflects its active contemporary music scene, which includes major venues such as the O2 Academy and Barrowlands.

=== Theatres ===
Glasgow has a number of theatres, including:

- Citizens Theatre
- Cottiers Theatre
- King's Theatre
- Mitchell Theatre
- Òran Mór
- Pavilion Theatre
- Royal Conservatoire of Scotland New Athenaeum Theatre
- Tramway, and production centre of Scottish Ballet
- Tron Theatre
- Theatre Royal, home of Scottish Opera and of Scottish Ballet
- Websters Theatre

=== Concert halls ===
- Glasgow Royal Concert Hall, home of Royal Scottish National Orchestra
- Glasgow City Halls, home of the BBC Scottish Symphony Orchestra
- Old Fruitmarket part of the City Halls
- SEC Centre, formerly the Scottish Exhibition and Conference Centre (SECC)
- SEC Armadillo which also stages theatre shows
- The SSE Hydro Arena

=== Performing arts ===
- City of Glasgow Chorus
- The National Piping Centre
- Amateur dramatics in Glasgow

== Parks ==
Glasgow has over 100 parks, gardens, recreational areas, green spaces and cemeteries across its area. Glasgow City Council manages a great number of these.

Glasgow City Council city and district parks (twenty of the total Glasgow City Council parks):

- Alexandra Park
- Auchinlea Park
- Bellahouston Park
- Cathkin Braes Country Park
- Dams to Darnley Country Park
- Darnley Mill Park
- Dawsholm Park
- Garscadden Burn Park
- George Square
- Glasgow Botanic Gardens
- Glasgow Green
- Hogganfield Park and Loch
- Kelvingrove Park
- Linn Park
- Pollok Country Park
- Queen's Park
- Ruchill Park
- Springburn Park
- Tollcross Park
- Victoria Park

Glasgow City Council local parks:

- Ardmay Park
- Ashtree Park
- Auldhouse Park
- Barlanark Park
- Barrachnie Park
- Beardmore Park
- Bennan Square
- Bingham's Pond
- Blairtummock Park
- Bridgeton Park
- Broomfield Park
- Broomhouse Park
- Buckingham Park
- Budhill Park
- Cardonald Park
- Carmunnock Coppice Woodland
- Carmunnock Village Green
- Carmyle New Park
- Castlemilk Park
- Cathedral Square
- Cathkin Park
- Citizens Rose Garden
- Cowlairs Park
- Cranhill Park
- Croftcoighn Park
- Cross Park
- Crosshill Park
- Dowanhill Park
- Drumchapel Park
- Duchray Park
- Early Braes Park
- Eastfield Park
- Elder Park
- Festival Park
- Garnethill Park
- Garrowhill Park
- Glenconner Park
- Gorbals New Park
- Govanhill Park
- Greenbank Park
- Greenfield Park
- Hayburn Park
- Helenslea Park
- Hogarth Park
- Holmlea Park
- Househill Park
- James Lindsay Park
- King George V Park
- King's Park
- Knightswood Park
- Lochar Park
- Mansewood Park
- Mansfield Park
- Maryhill Park
- Maxwell Park
- Milton Park
- Molendinar Park
- Mount Vernon Park
- Naesby Park
- Newlands Park
- Orchard Park
- Penilee Park
- Petershill Park
- Plantation Park
- Priesthill Park
- Riccarton Street Park
- Richmond Park
- Riddrie Park
- Robroyston Park
- Rosshall Park and Gardens
- Sandyhills Park
- Sherbourne Park
- Sighthill Park
- Spire Park
- Temple Park
- Thornwood Park
- Titwood Park
- Toryglen Park
- Yoker Park

== Festivals ==
As part of Glasgow's cultural renaissance, Glasgow is host to a variety of festivals throughout the year:-

- Celtic Connections – January
- Glasgow Film Festival – February
- Glasgow International Comedy Festival – March
- Glasgow International Festival (Visual Arts) – April
- Glasgow Art Fair – April
- Charles Rennie Mackintosh Festival
- Big Big Country – May (last held in 2006)
- West End Festival – June
- Lord Provost's Procession (discontinued)
- Glasgow International Jazz Festival – June
- North Glasgow International Festival (last held in 2005)
- Bard in the Botanics – July
- Glasgow's River Festival – July
- Pride Glasgow – July
- The Twelfth – July
- Glasgow Mela – June
- Black Saturday – August
- Piping Live! – August
- World Pipe Band Championships – August
- Merchant City Festival – September
- Glasgay! (discontinued) – November
- Glasgow's Hogmanay – December

Glasgow has also hosted the National Mòd no less than thirteen times since 1895 in 1895, 1901, 1907, 1911, 1921, 1933, 1938, 1948, 1958, 1967, 1988, 1990 and 2019.

== Exhibitions ==
The city was host to the three Great Exhibitions at Kelvingrove Park, in 1888 (International Exhibition), 1901 (Glasgow International Exhibition) and 1911 (Scottish Exhibition, Art and Industry). It later hosted the Empire Exhibition in 1938 and the Industrial exhibits of the Festival of Britain at the Kelvin Hall in 1951. More recently it held the Glasgow Garden Festival in 1988 and was European Capital of Culture in 1990, National City of Sport 1995–1999, UK City of Architecture and Design 1999 and European Capital of Sport 2003. The city hosted the 2014 Commonwealth Games.

== Contemporary music ==
Glasgow was awarded the title UNESCO City of Music in recognition of its live music scene.

Glasgow has many live music pubs, clubs and venues. Some of the city's main venues include the Glasgow Royal Concert Hall, the SECC and King Tut's Wah Wah Hut (where Oasis were spotted and signed by Glaswegian record mogul Alan McGee), the Queen Margaret Union and the Barrowland, a historic ballroom, converted into a live music venue. More recent mid-sized venues include ABC, Stereo, The Old Hairdressers and the Carling Academy, which play host to a similar range of acts. Numerous small venues, cafes and bars play host to the many smaller local and touring bands which regularly play in the city.

Glasgow is also home to a thriving electronic music scene, particularly associated with techno and house music. Venues like the Arches and the Sub Club, record labels such as Soma and Chemikal Underground and clubnights such as Optimo have supported this underground movement for the past two decades.

The city also boasts an experimental music scene, and plays home to Alex Neilson and Richard Youngs. Glasgow hosts the long-running Install and Subcurrent annual festivals, which have featured underground artists such as Gustav Metzger and Tony Conrad, as well as reclusive American musician Jandek's first ever live performance. The Soundlab season at Glasgow Concert Halls presents Scottish and international artists; while the Minimal Glasgow season features major names like Steve Reich and Philip Glass alongside up and coming acts.

A known noise rock act from Glasgow in the late nineties was Urusei Yatsura. In recent years, the success of bands such as Chvrches, Franz Ferdinand, Belle & Sebastian, Camera Obscura and Mogwai has significantly boosted the profile of the Glasgow music scene, prompting Time magazine to liken Glasgow to Detroit during its 1960s Motown heyday.

== See also ==
- Architecture of Glasgow
