= West End Festival =

Coordinates: 55.874°N 4.295°W

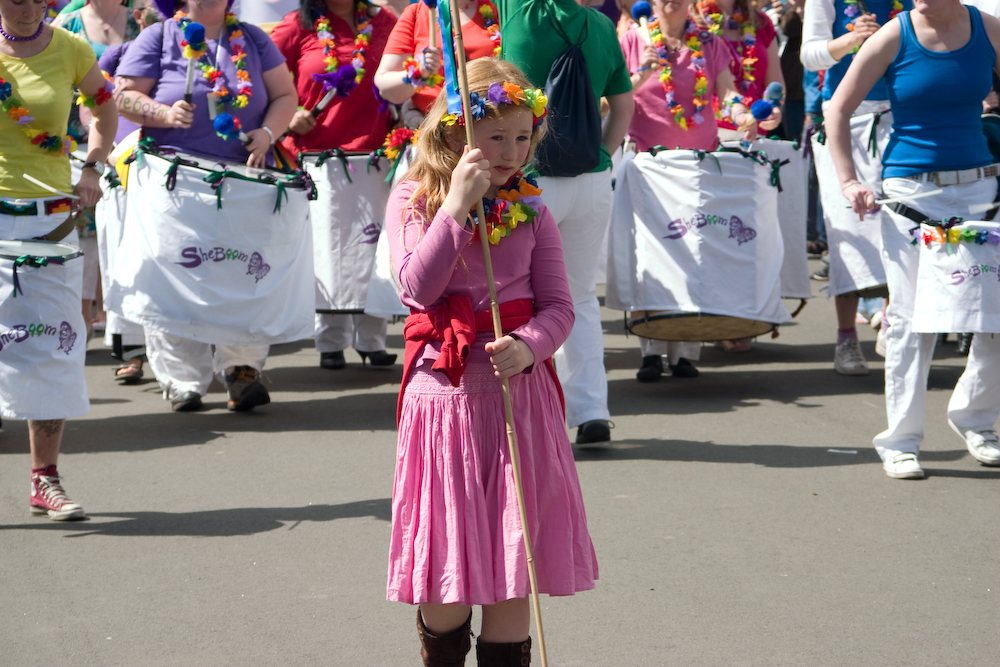
A girl holds up a banner leading the SheBoom percussion ensemble during the West-End Festival opening parade in June 2008.

Samba Ya Bamba brass section at the 2005 Opening Parade.

The West End Festival is an annual festival in the West End of Glasgow, Scotland.

== History ==
The West End Festival in Glasgow was started in 1996 by Michael Dale as a small local festival centred on Byres Road.

It has since become the biggest festival in Glasgow's calendar with events running for 16 days in June. It has been used as a model for other festival start-ups, as with minimal local authority or Scottish Arts Council funding, and has grown with each festival. Its centrepiece carnival parade is the largest carnival event in the UK after Notting Hill in London. In 2006 the parade day ran congruently with the Glasgow Mela; organisers billed it as "Scotland's Mardi Gras" and an estimated 100,000 people took to the streets and parks..

== Main Events ==
During the festival a wide range of activities and events take place. Prominent is a programme of live music, outdoor theatre, comedy, drama, guided walks, talks, film, children's events, various local street celebrations and markets, and a well-known Carnival Parade and Street Party on the opening Sunday. It has also hosted a series of events such as The Longest Day (1998/99), The Ideal Hut Show (in conjunction with Glasgow's Year of Architecture) and in 2004 a free outdoor concert led by Belle & Sebastian in the Glasgow Botanic Gardens and in 2006 an outdoor production with a cast of sixty actors based on the life of Jesus. In 2008 the Globe Theatre from London performed "Romeo and Juliet" in the hallowed quarters of the University of Glasgow quadrangle, underneath the iconic George Gilbert Scott tower. Regular features include the Bard in the Botanics (founded 1999), a Children's Author series featuring authors such as Julia Donaldson, and the Gibson Street Gala, started in 2004. In 2010 this attracted over 15,000 people. An innovation for 2010 was a West End Highland Games at Hughenden Sport Fields.

== Awards ==
The festival was placed in the top 30 festivals in Europe by The Independent newspaper. Two other Scottish festivals listed were listed, the Edinburgh Festival and T in the Park. The free 2004 Belle and Sebastian concert was voted in the top 20 gigs of all time by the Scotsman newspaper in 2007. The festival was voted number one in the top five reasons to visit Glasgow by Trip Advisor in 2007.

== Main Venues ==
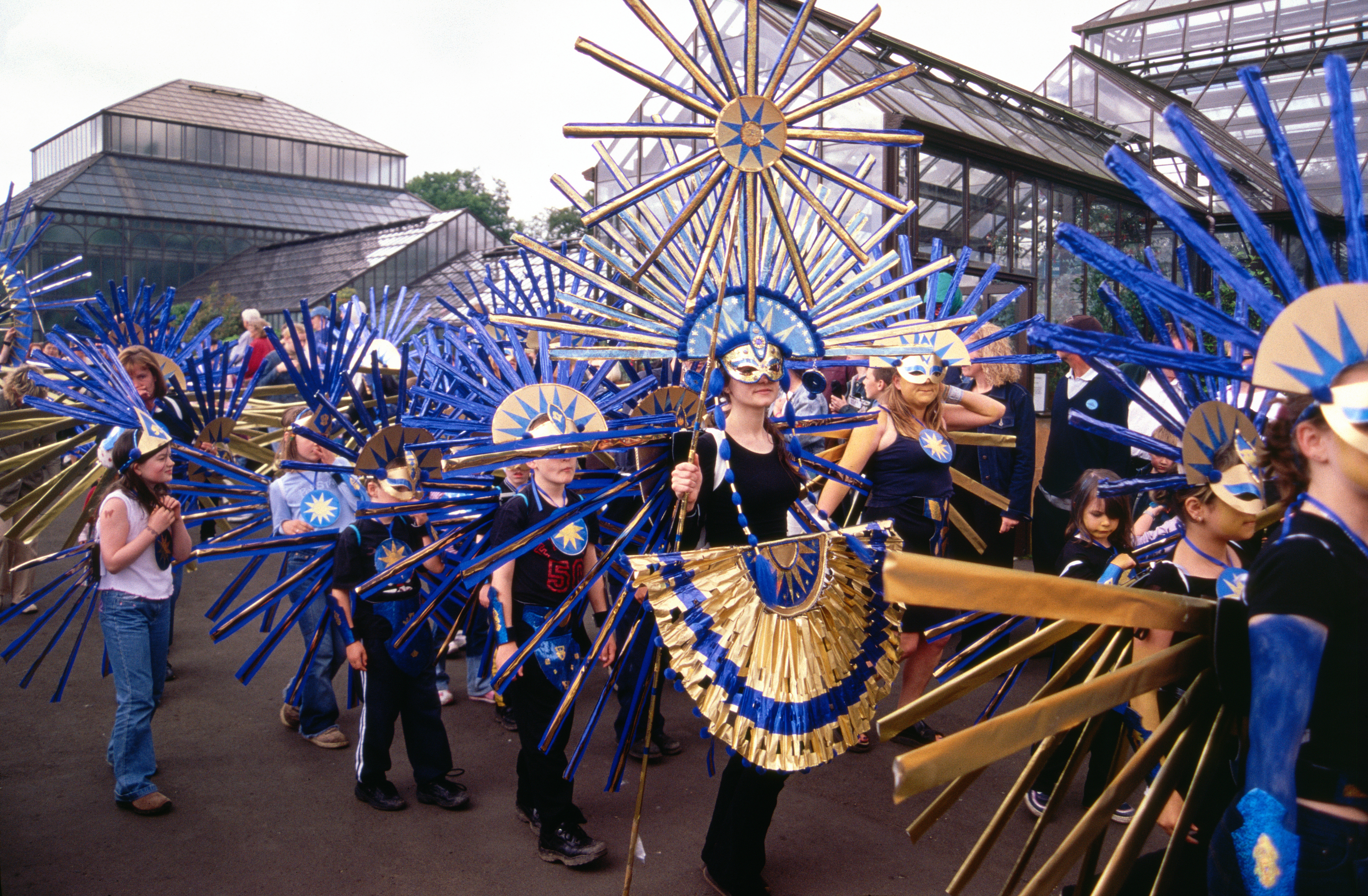
The 2002 parade heading through Glasgow Botanic Gardens

- Anniesland College
- Ashton Lane
- Captain's Rest
- Charles Rennie Mackintosh Church
- Coach House Trust
- College of Piping
- Cottier Theatre
- Gilmorehill G12
- Glasgow Botanic Gardens
- Glasgow Museum of Transport
- Hidden Lane
- Hillhead Baptist Church
- Hillhead Library
- Hunterian Museum
- Hyndland Parish Church
- Kelvin Stevenson Church
- Kelvinside Academy
- Kelvinside Allotments
- Kelvinside Hillhead Church
- Kelvingrove Art Gallery
- Kelvingrove Park
- Kibble Palace
- La Bodega / Dance With Attitude
- Lansdowne Church
- Mansfield Park
- Mitchell Library
- Òran Mór
- Partick Burgh Halls
- Partick Library
- St Bride's Church
- St Mary's Cathedral
- St. Luke's Orthodox Cathedral
- St Peter's Church, Partick
- Stand Comedy Club
- Steiner School
- Tchaiovna Tea Rooms
- The Tall Ship at Glasgow Harbour
- University of Glasgow
- Wellington Church
- West of Scotland Cricket Ground

== See also ==
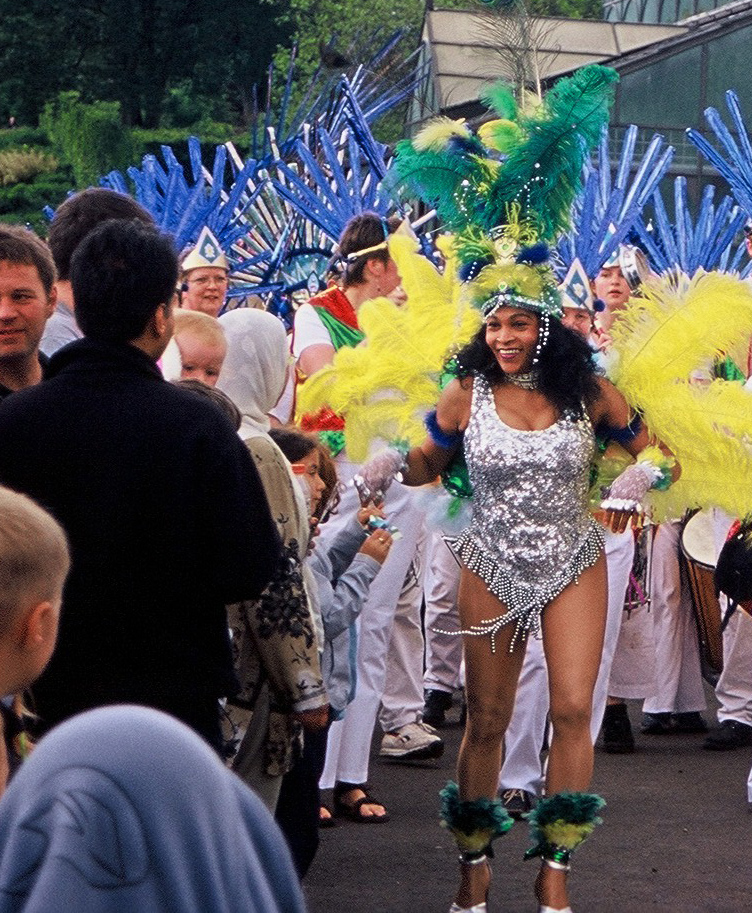
Dancer at the 2002 parade

- Culture in Glasgow
- Glasgow Festivals
