= Govan–Partick Bridge =

Bridge in Glasgow, Scotland

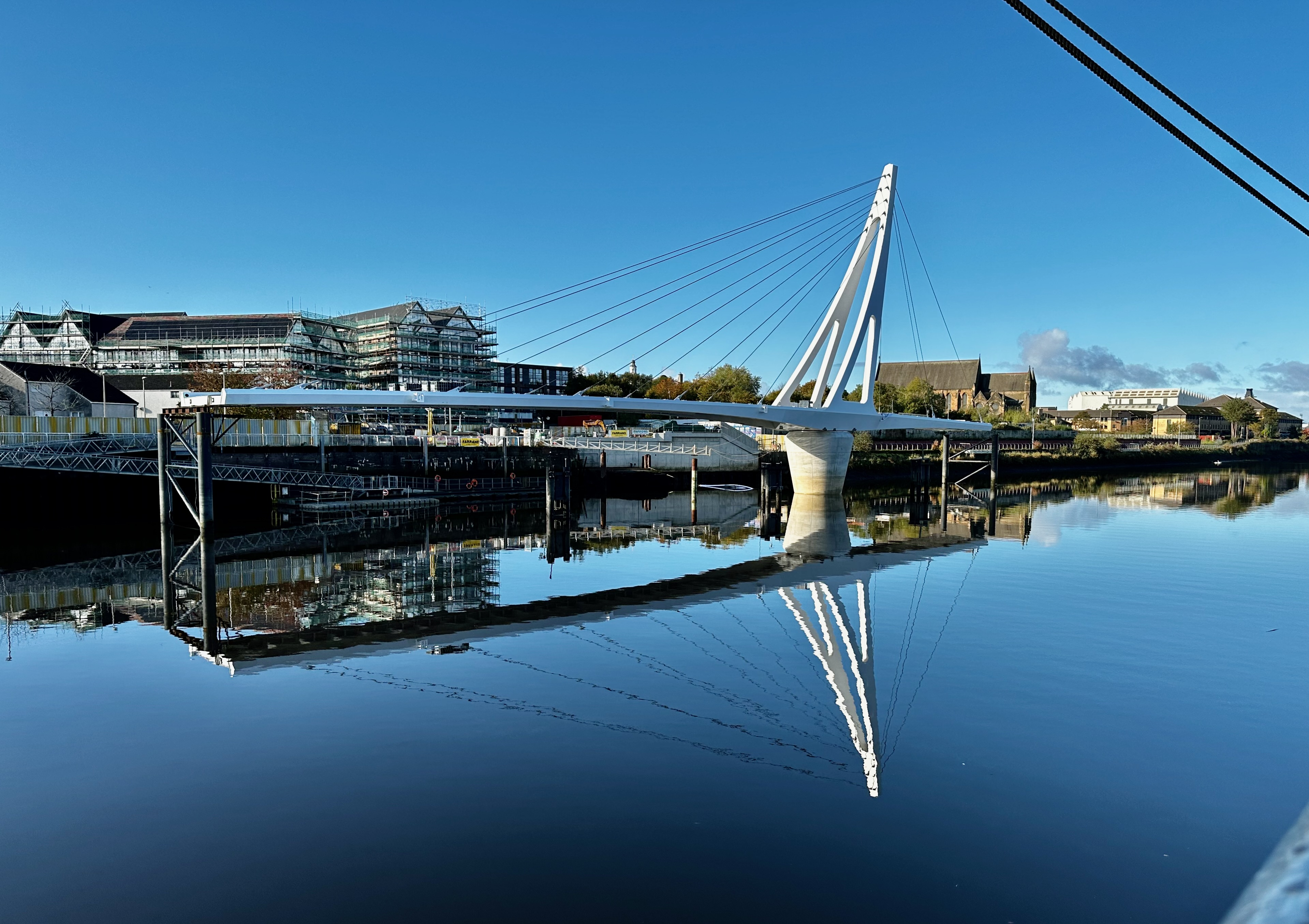
- View in October 2023 looking towards Govan, with the swing bridge main span aligned for ships to pass
- Coordinates: 55.8644°N 4.3084°W
- Crosses: River Clyde
- Locale: Glasgow

Characteristics
- Design: Swing
- Total length: 110 metres (360 ft)
- Width: 8 metres (26 ft)

History
- Opened: 7 September 2024
- Inaugurated: 6 September 2024

Location
- Interactive map of Govan–Partick Bridge

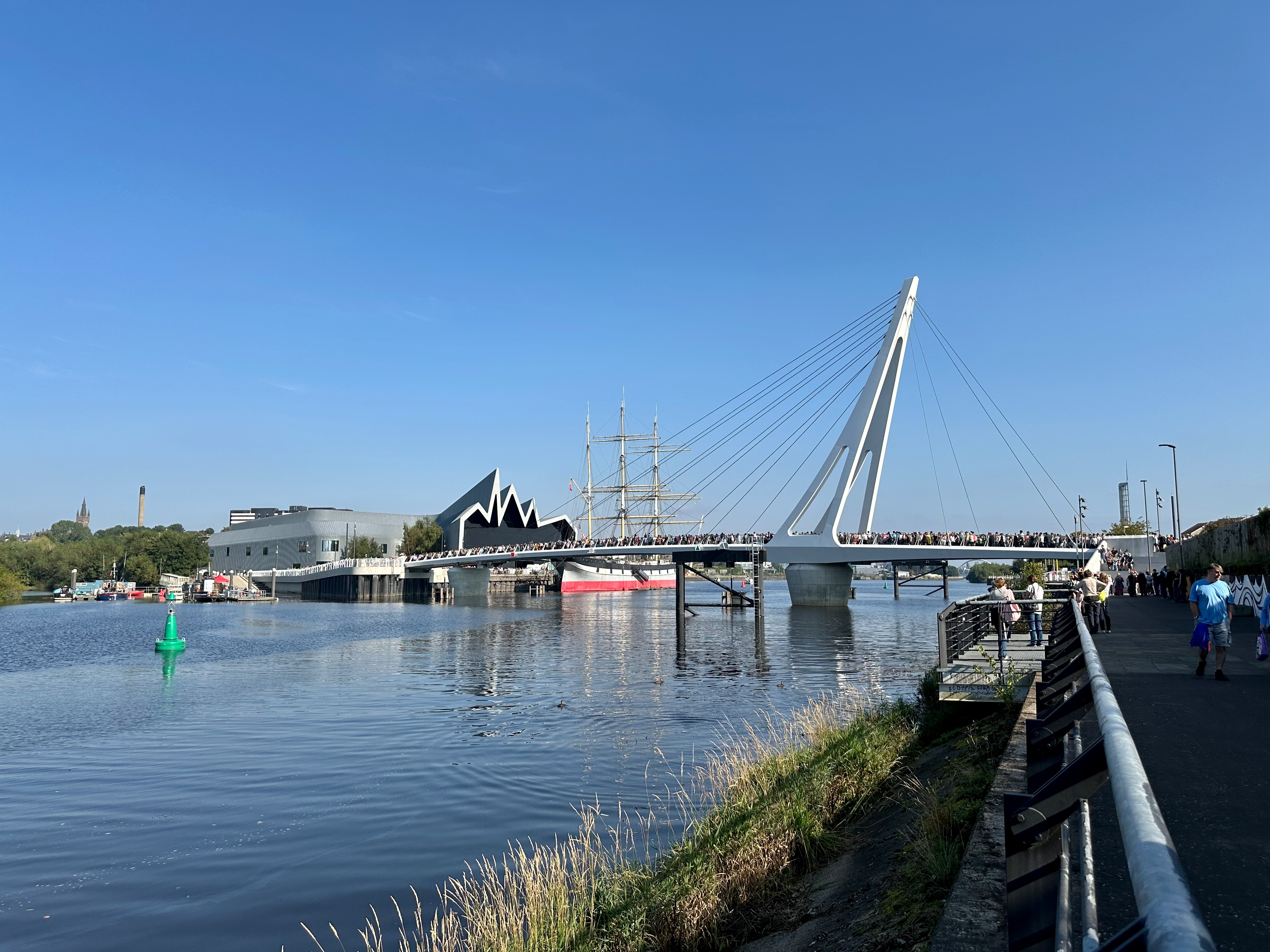
Govan–Partick Bridge crowded on first day of public use, seen from Govan Old Walkway

The Govan-Partick Bridge (also known locally as the swivelly bridge) is a footbridge in Glasgow, Scotland, designed to carry pedestrians and bicycles across the River Clyde, connecting Water Row in Govan to Pointhouse Quay in Partick, adjacent to the Riverside Museum. To allow ships including PS Waverley to pass by, its swing bridge main span can rotate to align with the south shore. The official opening ceremony on 6 September 2024 was followed by public access from the next day, when crowds celebrated with community events on both sides of the river.

The 110-metre-long (360-foot) bridge with its 8 m (26 ft) wide deck has step-free access, to carry bicycles, pedestrians, wheelchairs and buggies between Govan south of the river and Partick to the north. The V-shaped pylon design is inspired by the historic cranes at the riverside. It is one of the largest opening footbridges in Europe.

The work is intended to improve the economic conditions in Govan (which is a deprived area of the city) and is linked to the University of Glasgow and Glasgow City Council-led "West End Innovation Quarter" as part of the ongoing Clyde Waterfront Regeneration. The bridge lands at Water Row in Govan where a mixed use development of housing and commercial space is planned.

== History ==
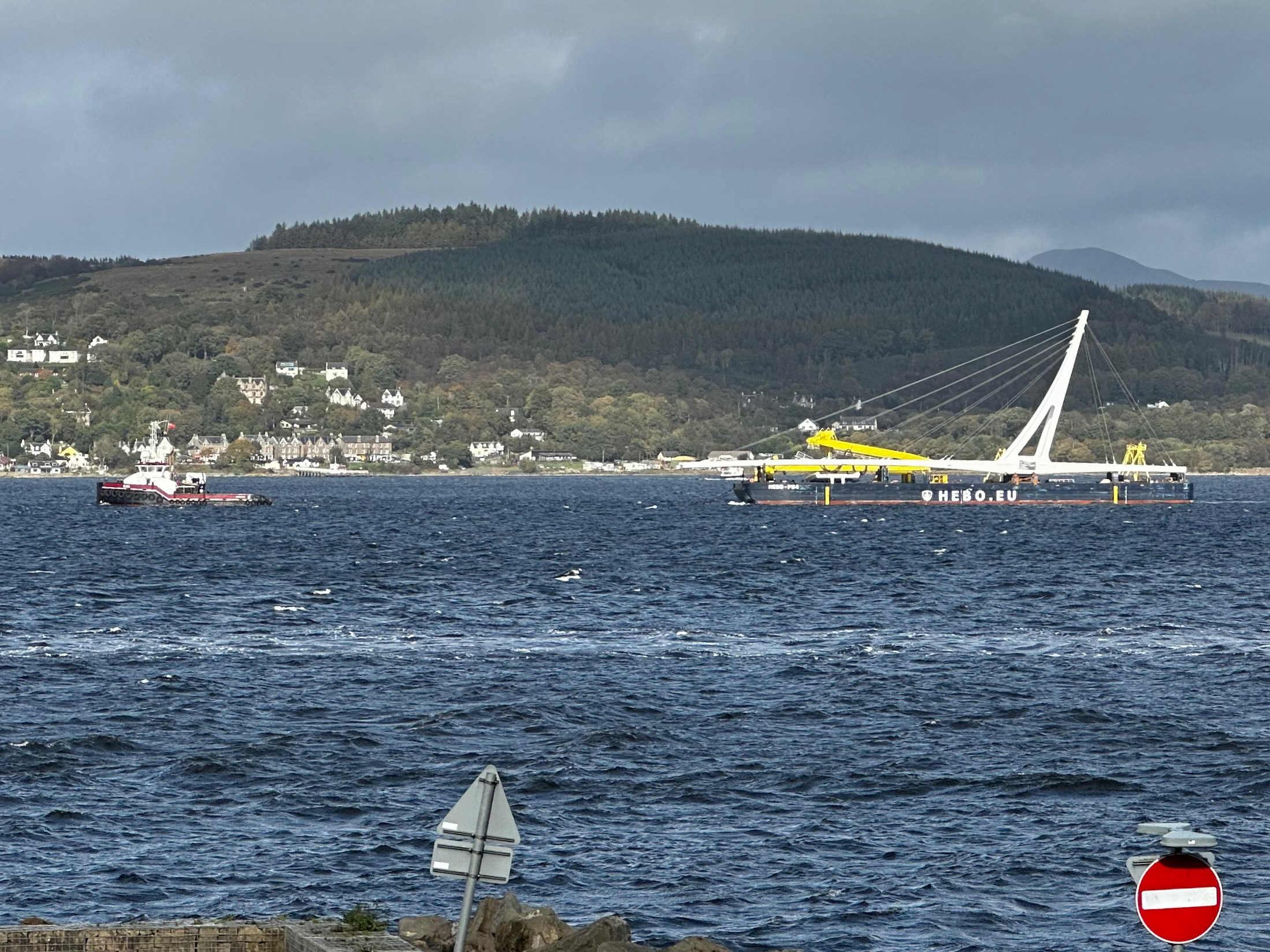
Bridge on pontoon towed by tug Elisa, off Kilcreggan

The bridge cost £29.5 million. It was funded through the Glasgow City Region City Deal, a pot to which the UK and Scottish Governments each provided £500M, and local authorities provided a further £130M. The Glasgow City Council led project was expected to start in 2020, with the bridge to open in summer 2021. In February 2020, the final plans for the bridge were revealed with an updated opening year of 2022. After further delays, construction finally began in January 2022, and opened on 6 September 2024.

The cafe on the second floor of the Riverside Museum has had a clear unobstructed view over the northern approach works area at the mouth of the River Kelvin to the site of the new bridge.

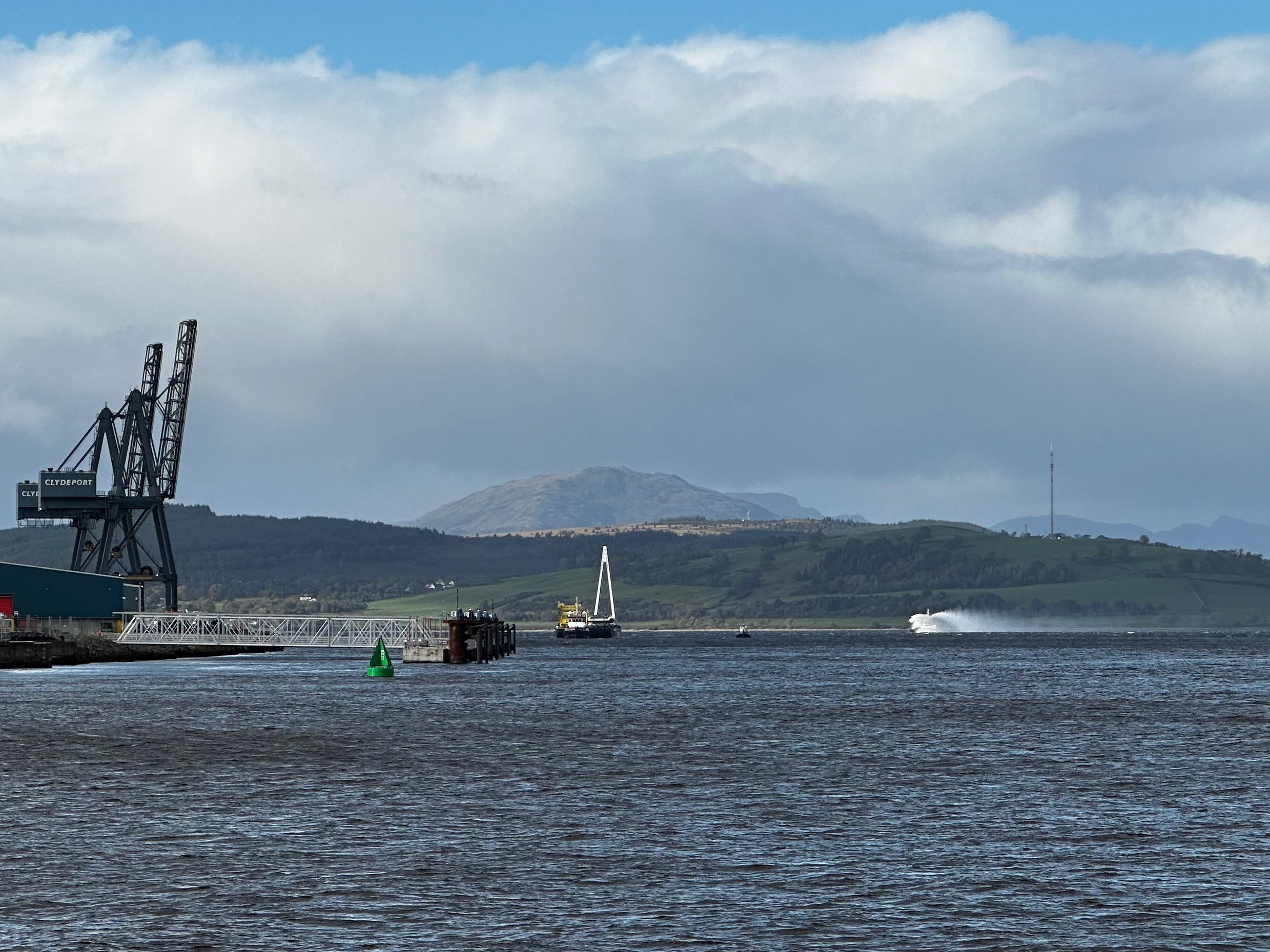
At Greenock Ocean Terminal, water jet display by CMS Wrestler

The bridge was built in Belgium, taken by canal to Westdorpe in the Netherlands, where the pylon and cabling was installed. It was loaded onto HEBO Maritiemservice pontoon Hebo-P84, and from 7 to 13 October 2023 towed by tug Elisa to the Firth of Clyde. They were met at the Tail of the Bank by Clyde Marine Services tugs CMS Wrestler and Bruiser. Delivery was postponed due to strong gusting wind, and the vessels stayed at Greenock Ocean Terminal overnight.

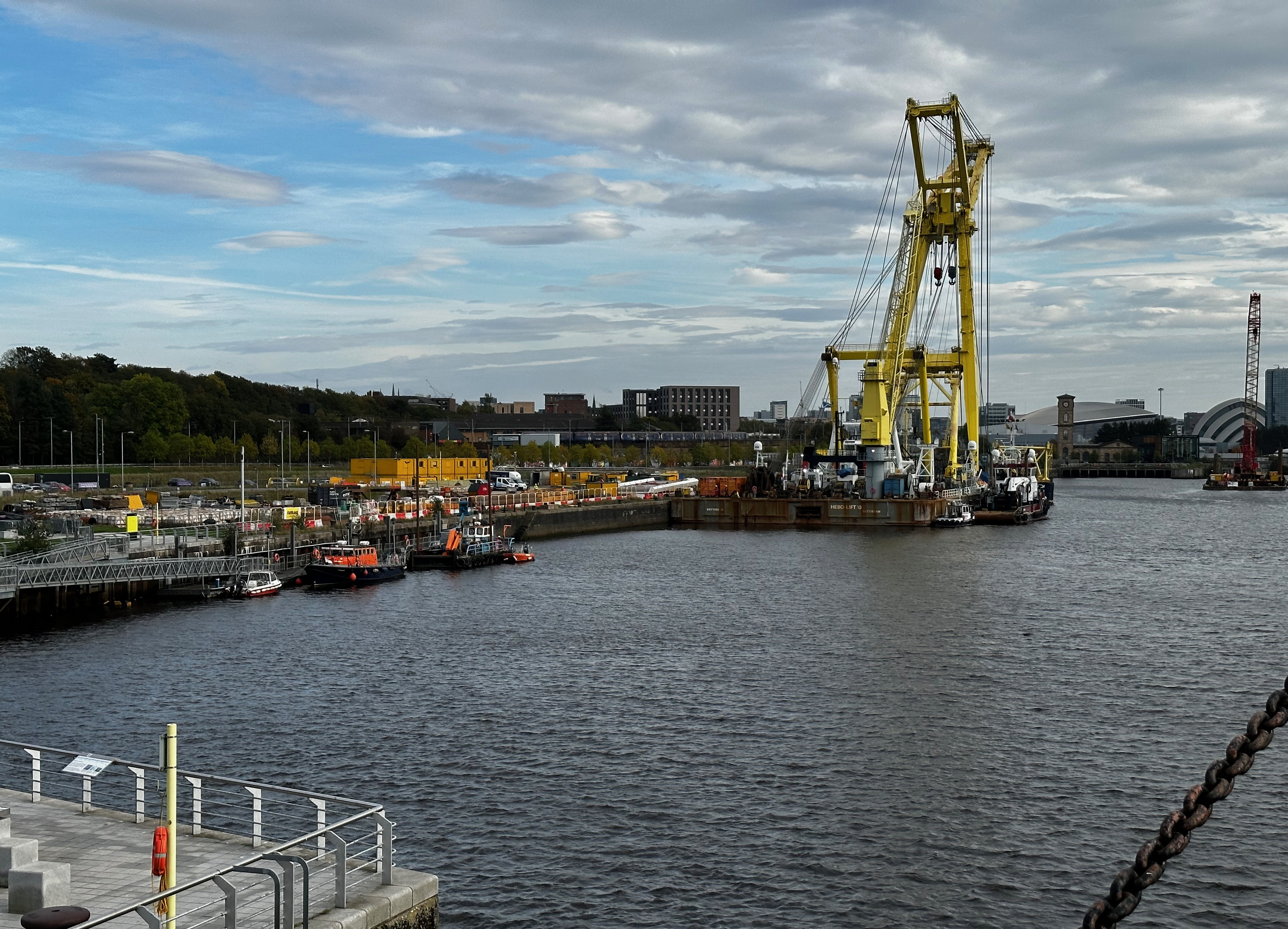
Bridge works area at Yorkhill Quay, seen from tall ship Glenlee – tugs Avontuur 2 and Elisa next to floating sheerleg crane Hebo-Lift 10, with pontoon Hebo-P84 behind the cane ship.

On 14 October 2023 the tugs towed the crane on its pontoon up the River Clyde into Glasgow, to Pointhouse Quay just upriver from the museum. They moored the pontoon just past floating sheerleg crane Hebo-Lift 10 which was already there, along with the small tug Avontuur 2. On 17 October the floating sheerleg crane lifted the moving main span of the bridge into place on its pivot in front of Water Row, Govan, leaving it aligned with the shore so that the Clyde remains open to shipping. Site work continued. The connecting fixed span, still on the pontoon, was taken away for storage, then installed in the summer of 2024 once the north pier and approach path works were sufficiently complete.

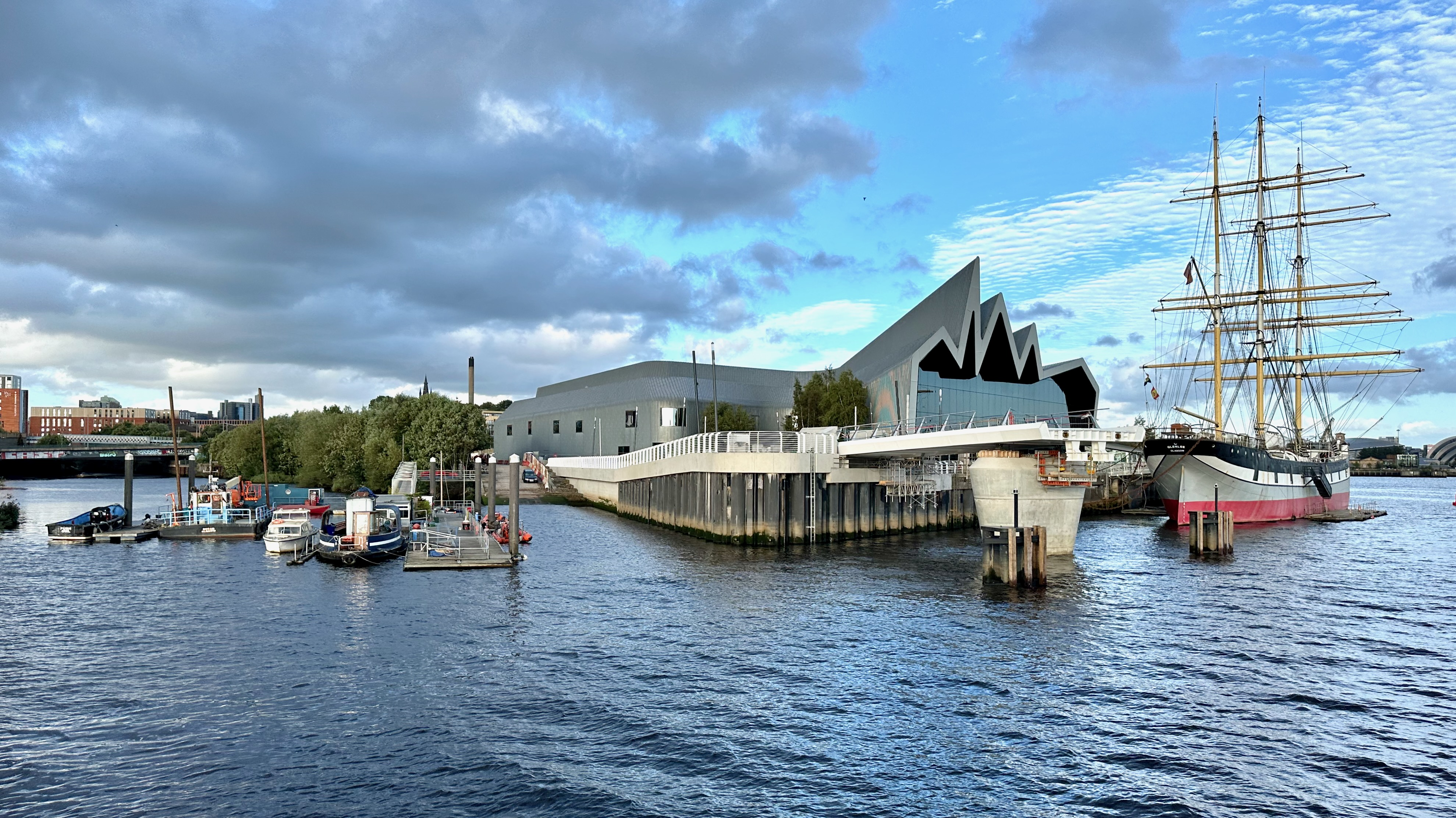
August 2024 view of the fixed span connected to Pointhouse Quay, seen from PS Waverley which was built at the adjacent Pointhouse shipyard.

The construction of the two large piers on the new bridge required bespoke formwork systems, designed and manufactured in-house by Special Formwork in close collaboration with Farrans Construction. SF manufactured each system to support the project's specific construction methods and timelines, using high-quality materials to ensure a superior pour finish.

The bridge opened on 7 September 2024.

=== Naming ===
During the building of the bridge, the city council was approached by people who suggested that the bridge be named after various individuals and organisations, including Billy Connolly, Alex Ferguson, Jimmy Reid and the Merchant Navy. Govan Community Council launched a petition to name it in honour of Mary Barbour, a local political activist. The council replied that there was "no intention for the name to be anything other than the Govan-Partick Bridge given the important role that the structure will play in reinstating the historic link between the communities".

== See also ==
- Renfrew Bridge (Renfrew–Yoker), similar contemporaneous project downriver
- List of bridges in Scotland
