= Glasgow Life =

Brand of a charity in Glasgow, Scotland

- Formation: 22 December 2006
- Type: Charitable organisation
- Legal status: Subsidiary organisation to Glasgow City Council
- Purpose: Management of culture, sporting and learning activities in Glasgow, Scotland
- Headquarters: Commonwealth House, 38 Albion Street; Glasgow, G1
- Region served: Glasgow
- Executive Director: Susan Deighan
- Chair: Bailie Christie
- Parent organisation: Glasgow City Council
- Budget: 2021–22: £123.4 million (including a £76.7M service fee from Glasgow City Council)
- Staff: 2,660
- Volunteers: 850
- Website: glasgowlife.org.uk

Glasgow Life is the principal trading name and brand of Culture and Sport Glasgow, a charity based in Glasgow, Scotland. It is an Arm's Length External Organisation, separate from Glasgow City Council, with operating responsibility for managing the arts, music, sports, events, festivals, libraries and learning programmes for the council. It is the 14th largest charity, by income, in Scotland, and its formation has been described as "one of the highest profile transfers of functions from a council to a charitable Trust in the UK" and that "...the inclusion of libraries was unprecedented".

== History ==
Culture and Sport Glasgow was formed as a company in December 2006, and a registered charity from February 2007. The organisation's board agreed to adopt the name and brand "Glasgow Life" in January 2010.

=== Notable events ===
Year	Events
2023	Glasgow Life becomes the first UK museum to repatriate objects to India
2022	Burrell collection reopened by King Charles III
2021	Venue re-opening plans, but possible closures of libraries, museums, sports and community centres; Glasgow City Council announce £100m financial guarantee for charity
2020	Glasgow Life warn of uncertain future due to Coronavirus pandemic
2016	Burrell Collection closes for refurbishment; Glasgow City Marketing Bureau becomes wholly owned subsidiary
2015	Tramway hosts the 2015 Turner Prize
2014	City hosts 2014 Commonwealth Games. Glasgow Life key partner for sporting venues and cultural programme
2010	Adopts 'Glasgow Life' branding; Glasgow Royal Concert Hall, Glasgow City Halls, Glasgow Old Fruitmarket added
2007	Charitable status granted
2006	Company formed

== Responsibilities ==
Glasgow Life are responsible for six service areas within the city:

- Public Libraries, including 32 community libraries, 29 school libraries and the Mitchell Library.
- Sport venues and facilities, including
  - Tollcross International Swimming Centre
  - Commonwealth Arena and Sir Chris Hoy Velodrome
- 10 Museums
  - See Glasgow Museums
- Arts and Music, through management of culture venues and festivals, including
  - Glasgow Royal Concert Hall
  - Glasgow City Halls
- Local community centres
- Young Glasgow, providing services aimed at children, young people and their parent/carers.

== Structure and Governance ==
The charity is controlled by Glasgow City Council. It is governed by a Board of directors, consisting of:

- 8 independent directors
- 5 partner directors (drawn from within Glasgow City Council)
- Executive Director

The Chair is Councillor Bailie Christie, and the Chief Executive is Susan Deighan.

There are a number of sub-committees, including:

- Audit
- Nominations
- Health and safety

== Funding ==
The majority of the income for the organisation is provided as a service fee from Glasgow City Council, with annual reports showing this is approximately 60% of income.

=== Audited figures ===
Glasgow Life is regulated in its charitable activities by the Office of the Scottish Charity Regulator (OSCR), which publishes headline income and expenditure figures, with full accounts available from Companies House. The 'Service Fee' is the direct contribution from Glasgow City Council.

Financial Year end	Income	(Of which Service fee)	Expenditure	Difference
31 March 2012	£117,221,000	£78,148,000	£118,274,000	£(-1,053,000)
31 March 2013	£118,586,000	£78,207,000	£116,486,000	£2,082,000
31 March 2014	£121,482,000	£78,096,276	£131,364,000	£(-9,882,000)
31 March 2015	£126,032,000	£77,547,397	£130,860,000	£(-4,828,000)
31 March 2016	£119,535,000	£75,379,960	£120,674,000	£(-1,139,000)
31 March 2017	£127,268,000	£72,793,769	£124,579,000	£2,689,000
31 March 2018	£121,482,000	£73,549,000	£131,364,000	£(-9,882,000)
31 March 2019	£128,116,000	£73,375,000	£142,745,000	£(-14,629,000)
31 March 2020	£124,923,000	£75,545,000	£135,972,000	£(-11,049,000)
31 March 2021	£118,439,000	£77,988,000	£116,530,000	£1,909,000
31 March 2022	£123,430,000	£76,716,000	£132,855,000	£(-9,425,000)
