= Glasgow International Jazz Festival =

Coordinates: 55.861°N 4.259°W

Glasgow International Jazz Festival is a jazz festival in Glasgow, Scotland.

== Main Festival ==
The Glasgow International Jazz Festival is held annually in June in the Merchant City area of Glasgow. The main, open-air stage is situated in George Square with the main internal base being the newly refurbished Old Fruitmarket, part of the City Halls complex.

== Fringe Festival ==
Apart from the main festival, many bars, restaurants and hotels feature fringe artists as well as the main festival venues.

== See also ==
- Culture in Glasgow
