= Amateur dramatics in Glasgow =

Glasgow, the largest city in Scotland, supports a large number of active amateur dramatics and musical theatre companies. Some of the larger companies use the professional stages at the King's Theatre, Theatre Royal and The Pavilion, and in the past the Alhambra Theatre. The Mitchell Theatre, run by Glasgow City Council, is one of the most popularly used theatres for amateur companies, as is the Eastwood Park Theatre operated in the south side. In 2022 Theatre South Productions refurbished a new venue in Cambuslang (Cambuslang Community Theatre at CPC) which is proving to be popular due to the high technical specification.

== Musical theatre companies ==
- The Lyric Club formed in 1902
- Glasgow Light Opera Club (GLOC) originally formed in 1907 as the St Mungo Opera Club. The club is now known as the Glasgow Light Opera Club and performs a musical theatre production annually in the King's Theatre Glasgow. Since the club's inception in 1907, it has been part of its constitution that it supports charitable causes through its musical endeavours, both locally and internationally.
- Pantheon Club Glasgow formed in 1926, with their first production staged at the Theatre Royal, February 1927
- The Minerva Club formed in 1927
- New Victory Players established in 1945 are based in the South Side of Glasgow with members from all over the city. Productions are both Plays and Musicals.
- The Cecilian Society formed at Glasgow University in 1952
- Theatre Guild Glasgow formed in 1960
- The Apollo Players formed in 1966
- Runway Theatre Company founded at Glasgow Airport as the Glasgow Airport Drama Club) in 1967 and renamed in 2007.
- Theatre South Productions formed in 1993. Famous in the central belt for being a “triple threat club” - with strong talent in singing, dancing and acting. TSP recently reformed as a Community Interest Company and in 2023 refurbished their own 144 seater auditorium “The Cambuslang Community Theatre” where they regularly perform musicals and cabarets. For major shows (once or twice a year) TSP use The Kings theatre in Glasgow. Open to 18+.
- Star-Light Theatre Group formed in 2008
- Mad Props Theatre - Glasgow's charitable theatre initiative raising funds for Leukaemia & Lymphoma Research
- Operating Theatre Company formed in the medical faculty of Glasgow University
