= Glasgow City Halls =

Concert hall in Glasgow, Scotland, UK

Coordinates: 55.85884°N 4.24483°W

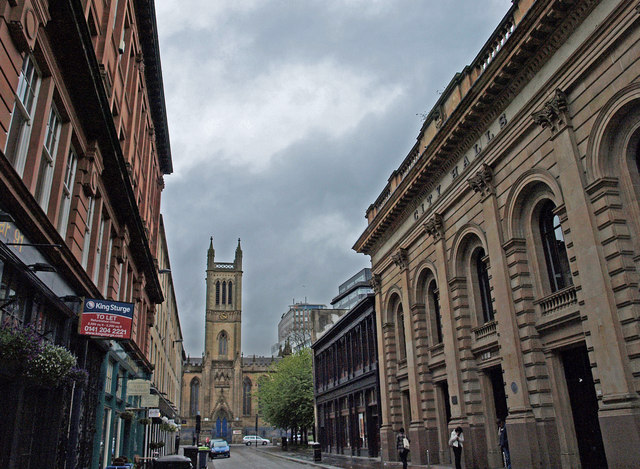
Exterior of the City Halls in Candleriggs.

Glasgow's City Halls and Old Fruitmarket is a concert hall and former market located on Candleriggs, in the Merchant City, Glasgow, Scotland.

== History ==
The City Halls are part of a market complex designed by John Carrick in 1882, but the grand hall itself was designed by George Murray and opened in 1841. It was the first hall suitable for large gatherings and concerts to be built in the City and played host to the likes of Benjamin Disraeli, Charles Dickens, Hungarian patriot Lajos Kossuth and William Ewart Gladstone. From its early days it hosted a wide variety of popular and classical concerts including those by touring groups such as Louis-Antoine Jullien's celebrated London-based orchestra and Charles Halle's orchestra from Manchester. Glasgow's first regular orchestral subscription concert series, played by an orchestra managed by the Glasgow Choral Union, was given in the grand hall from 1874 until the opening of the much larger St Andrew's Hall in 1877. Arthur Sullivan was its conductor for two seasons from 1875 to 1877. The Old Fruitmarket directly adjoins the grand hall and was a functioning market until the 1970s after which it was in occasional use for jazz and folk music events. The adjoining buildings were home to bustling produce markets such as the fresh fruit and flower market and the cheese market.

In the past it featured concerts by the Scottish Chamber Orchestra and the BBC Scottish Symphony Orchestra. For a number of years, after the destruction by fire of the St Andrews Hall in 1962, it was used for concerts by the Royal Scottish National Orchestra, until the opening of Glasgow Royal Concert Hall in 1990. It has also been a venue for many of Glasgow's Festivals, including Celtic Connections, Mayfest and the Jazz Festival, as well as political and trade union gatherings. It has been protected as a category A listed building since 1970.

== Concert hall ==
The City Halls and Old Fruitmarket re-opened in January 2006 after undergoing a period of extensive renovation. The refurbished halls are now the home of the BBC Scottish Symphony Orchestra and the Scottish Music Centre, both members of a partnership with the City Council and Glasgow Cultural Enterprises. The hall is also the regular performance space for the Scottish Chamber Orchestra in Glasgow and is a centre for music education with the city's Education Department as a key participant.

The venue consists of several performance venues under one roof, managed by Glasgow Cultural Enterprises (which also manages The Glasgow Royal Concert Hall):

1. The "Grand Hall", or main City Hall auditorium, which is a traditional "shoebox"-shaped hall with very fine acoustics seating 1066 in total. This is the home of the BBC Scottish Symphony Orchestra (SSO) which rehearses, records and performs here. The stage can accommodate an orchestra of over 90 and there are choir seats for 110. The hall is also used regularly by the (Edinburgh-based) Scottish Chamber Orchestra for its Glasgow concerts and by the Scottish Ensemble, among others.
2. The Recital Room, a new space suitable for chamber music, seating around 100.
3. The Old Fruitmarket, an atmospheric venue still retaining its market hall character with a flexible capacity of 1000–2000. This is used for jazz and traditional music events, and also by the BBC SSO for more experimental contemporary music events.

The City Halls also houses the Scottish Music Centre, offices and recording facilities for the BBC SSO, and extensive music education facilities. Arup Acoustics provided the acoustic design for the renovation, working closely with the architects Civic Design, venue consultants Arup Venue Consultancy and engineers Arup Scotland.

== See also ==
- Culture in Glasgow
