= Riverside Museum =

Transport museum in Glasgow, Scotland

Coordinates: 55.8651°N 4.30638°W

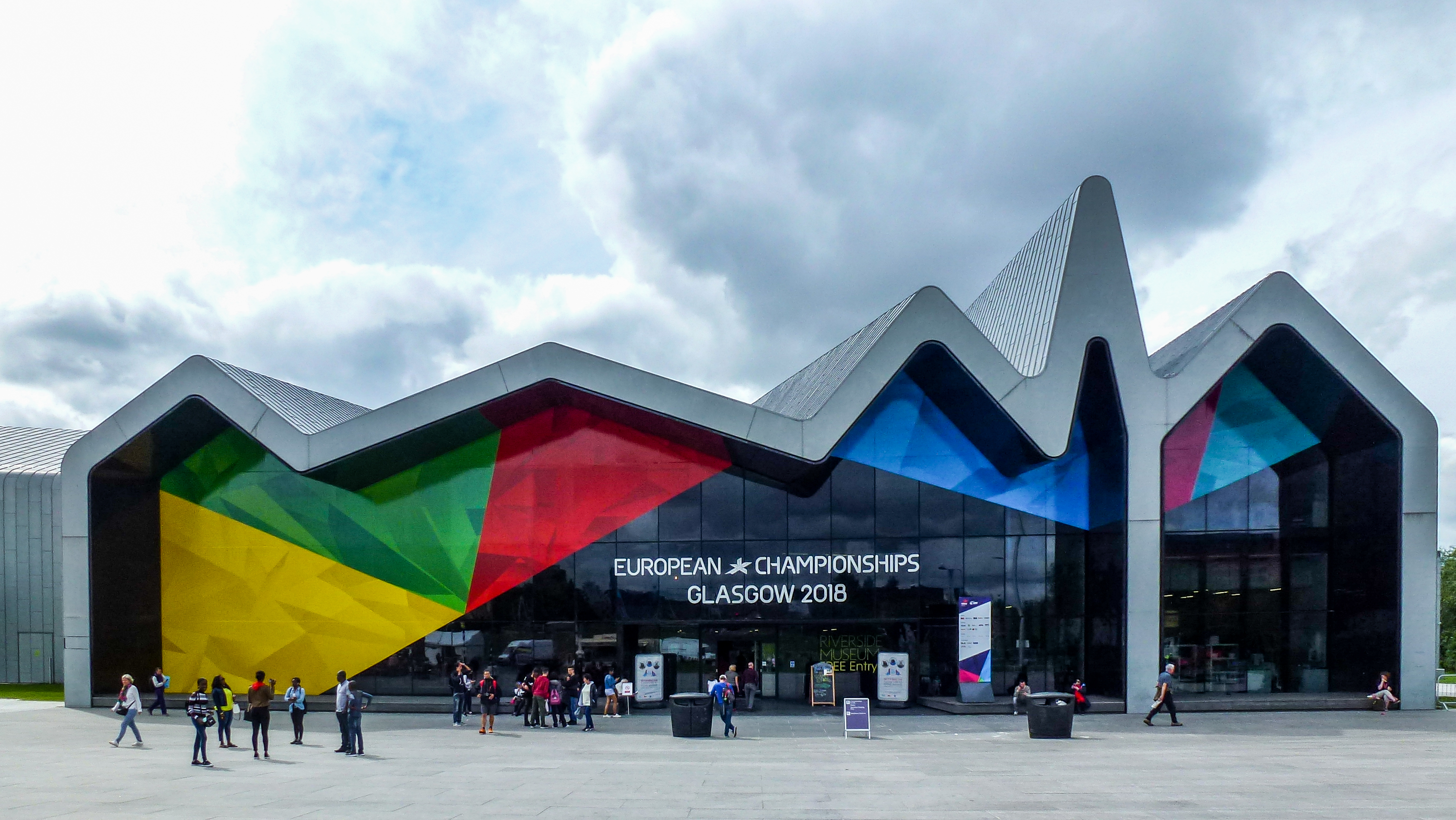
- Established: 14 April 1964; 62 years ago (as Glasgow Museum of Transport); 21 June 2011; 15 years ago (as Riverside Museum)
- Dissolved: 18 April 2010; 16 years ago (as Glasgow Museum of Transport)
- Location: 100 Pointhouse Road, Partick, Glasgow, G3 8RS, Scotland, (The site overlaps Yorkhill Quay to the east)
- Collection size: 3,000 objects
- Visitors: 1,212,151 in 2025
- Architect: Zaha Hadid
- Public transit access: Partick; Govan
- Website: www.glasgowlife.org.uk/museums/venues/riverside-museum

The Riverside Museum (replacing the preceding Glasgow Museum of Transport) is a museum in the Partick area of Glasgow, Scotland, housed in a building designed by Zaha Hadid Architects, with its River Clyde frontage at the new Pointhouse Quay. It forms part of the Glasgow Harbour regeneration project. The building opened in June 2011, winning the 2013 European Museum of the Year Award. It houses many exhibits of national and international importance. The Govan–Partick Bridge, which provides a pedestrian and cycle path link from the museum across the Clyde to Govan, opened in 2024.

== History ==
=== Glasgow Museum of Transport (1964–2010) ===
The Museum of Transport was opened on 14 April 1964 by Queen Elizabeth The Queen Mother. Created in the wake of the closure of Glasgow's tramway system in 1962, it was initially located at the former Coplawhill tram depot on Albert Drive in Pollokshields, before moving to the Kelvin Hall in 1988. The old building was subsequently converted into the Tramway arts centre.

The museum was then situated inside the Kelvin Hall opposite the Kelvingrove Art Gallery and Museum in Yorkhill in the west end of Glasgow. The Kelvin Hall was built in 1927, and operated as an exhibition centre prior of the opening of the Scottish Exhibition and Conference Centre in 1985, then was converted in 1987 to house the Museum of Transport and the Kelvin Hall International Sports Arena.

The Kelvin Hall site itself closed in April 2010, with the Museum moving to its third home at the Riverside Museum in June 2011.

=== Riverside Museum (2011–present) ===
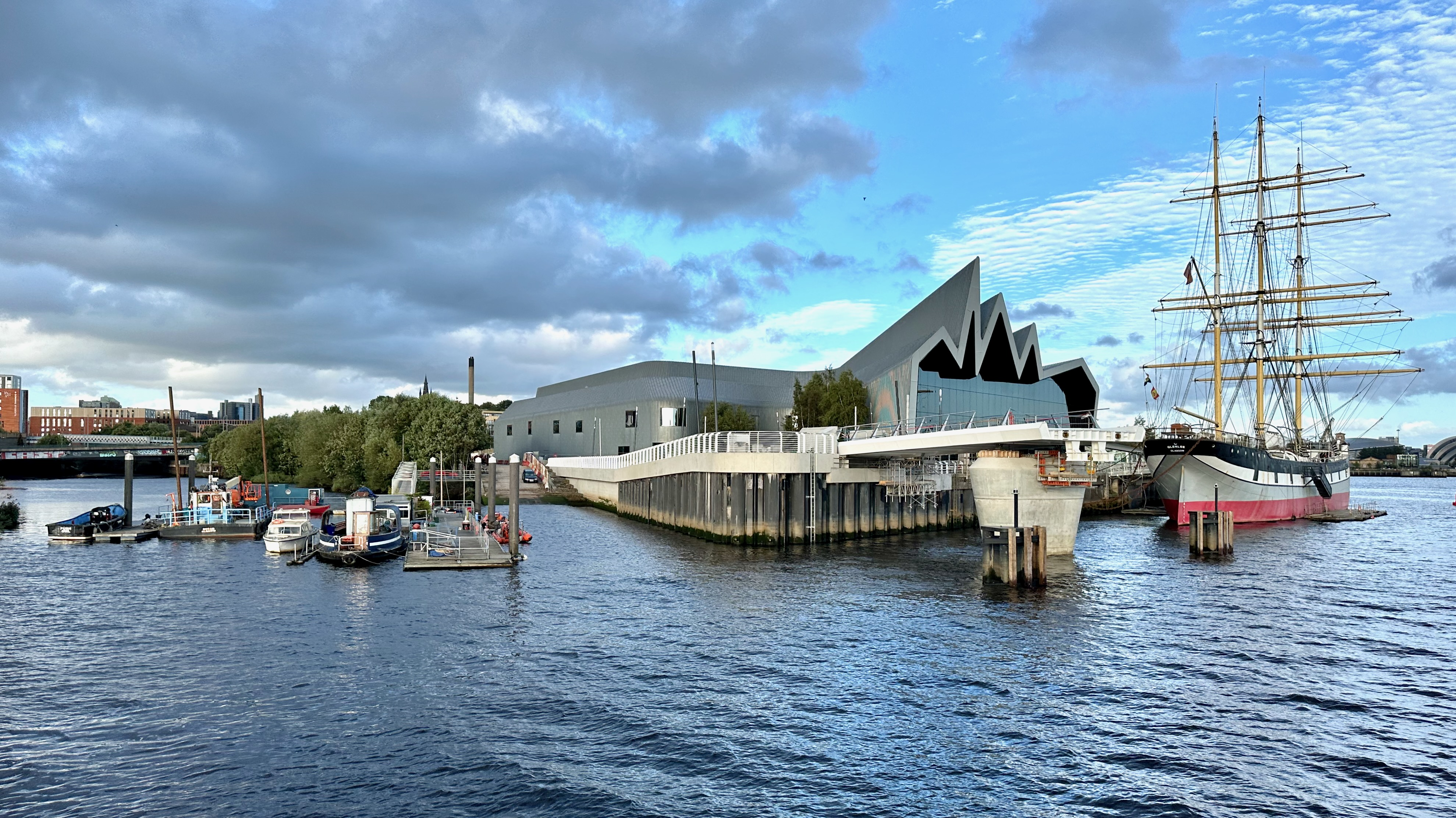
River Kelvin at its confluence with the Clyde. In front of the Riverside Museum, Pointhouse Quay links to the fixed span of the Govan–Partick Bridge, and is the permanent berth of the tall ship Glenlee.

The museum at the Kelvin Hall closed for the final time on 18 April 2010, with most of its collections moved to the purpose-built Riverside Museum at Pointhouse in Partick, located next to the confluence between the River Kelvin and the Clyde. This site, where the former A. & J. Inglis shipyard built the PS Waverley, enables the Clyde Maritime Trust's tall ship Glenlee and other visiting craft to berth alongside the museum. The current museum opened on Tuesday 21 June 2011.

The Riverside Museum building was designed by Zaha Hadid Architects and engineers Buro Happold. The internal exhibitions and displays were designed by Event Communications, a specialist London-based museum design firm.

Of the £74 million needed for the development of the Riverside Museum, Glasgow City Council and the National Lottery Heritage Fund have committed £69 million. The Riverside Museum Appeal is a charitable trust established to raise the final £5 million in sponsorship and donations from companies, trusts and individuals for the development of the museum. The Riverside Museum Appeal Trust is recognised as a Scottish Charity SC 033286. Major patrons of the project include: BAE Systems Maritime – Naval Ships, Weir Group, Rolls-Royce Holdings, FirstGroup, Strathclyde Partnership for Transport, Caledonian MacBrayne, Arnold Clark, SSE plc, Diageo, Bank of Scotland and Optical Express.

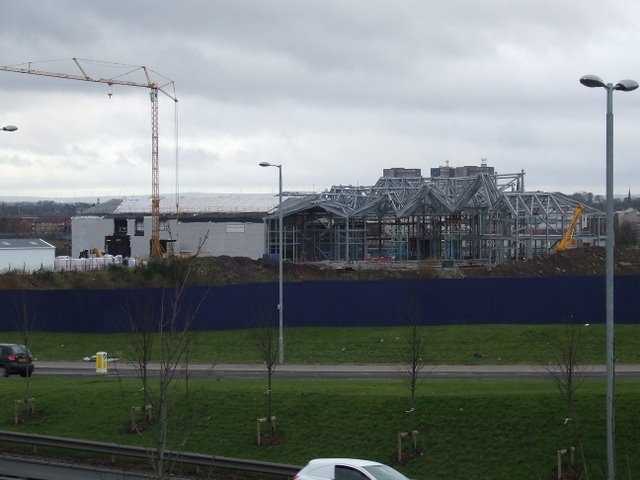
Construction, February 2009 & February 2010

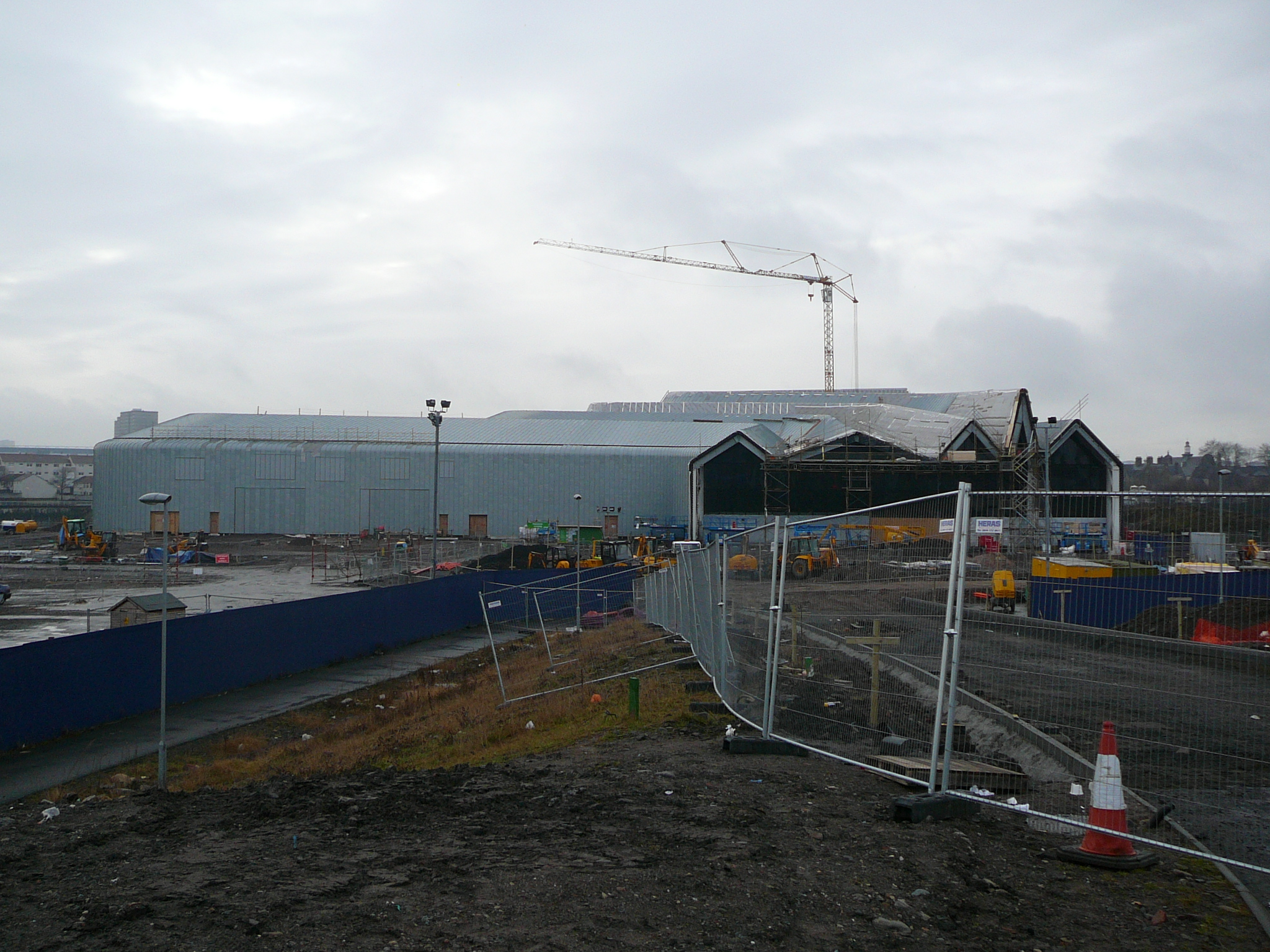

The current museum's home was announced in February 2003 with Zaha Hadid picked as the architect in a competition in October 2004 and the design unveiled in November 2005. On 13 November 2007 the Lord Provost of Glasgow, Bob Winter cut the first turf. The main contractors for the project were BAM Construct UK Ltd with a range of trade subcontractors including the services installations being delivered by BBESL's team of Jordan Kerr, Gordon Ferguson & Jamie Will and FES, project management being the responsibility of Capita Property and Infrastructure and Buro Happold providing Resident Engineering Services. The building was completed on 20 June 2011 and the next day it opened to the public.

== Collections ==
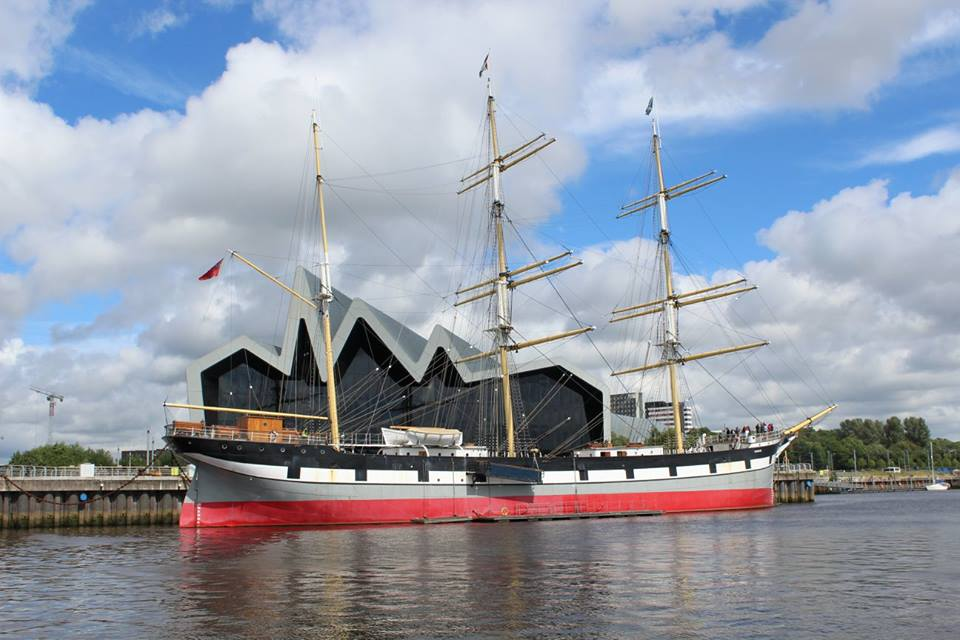
The Riverside Museum with The Tall Ship Glenlee berthed outside

As well as housing many of the existing collections of the Glasgow Museum of Transport, the city has acquired SAR Class 15F 4-8-2 steam locomotive, No.3007. Built by the Glasgow-based North British Locomotive Company at its Polmadie Works in 1945, the locomotive was bought in late 2006 from Transnet. It was on display in George Square for a short time in 2007, as part of the effort to raise the £5 million public contribution funding.

=== Road vehicles ===
The museum houses the oldest surviving pedal cycle and the world's leading collection of Scottish-built cars and trucks, including pioneering examples from Scottish manufacturers Argyll, Arrol-Johnston and Albion. More modern Scottish-built cars, namely the Rootes Group's Hillman Imp, Hillman Avenger and Chrysler Sunbeam are represented too along with many other motorcars in a large showroom-type display sponsored by Arnold Clark.

All forms of transport are featured, from horse-drawn vehicles to fire engines, from motorcycles to caravans, even toy cars and prams.

=== Ship models ===
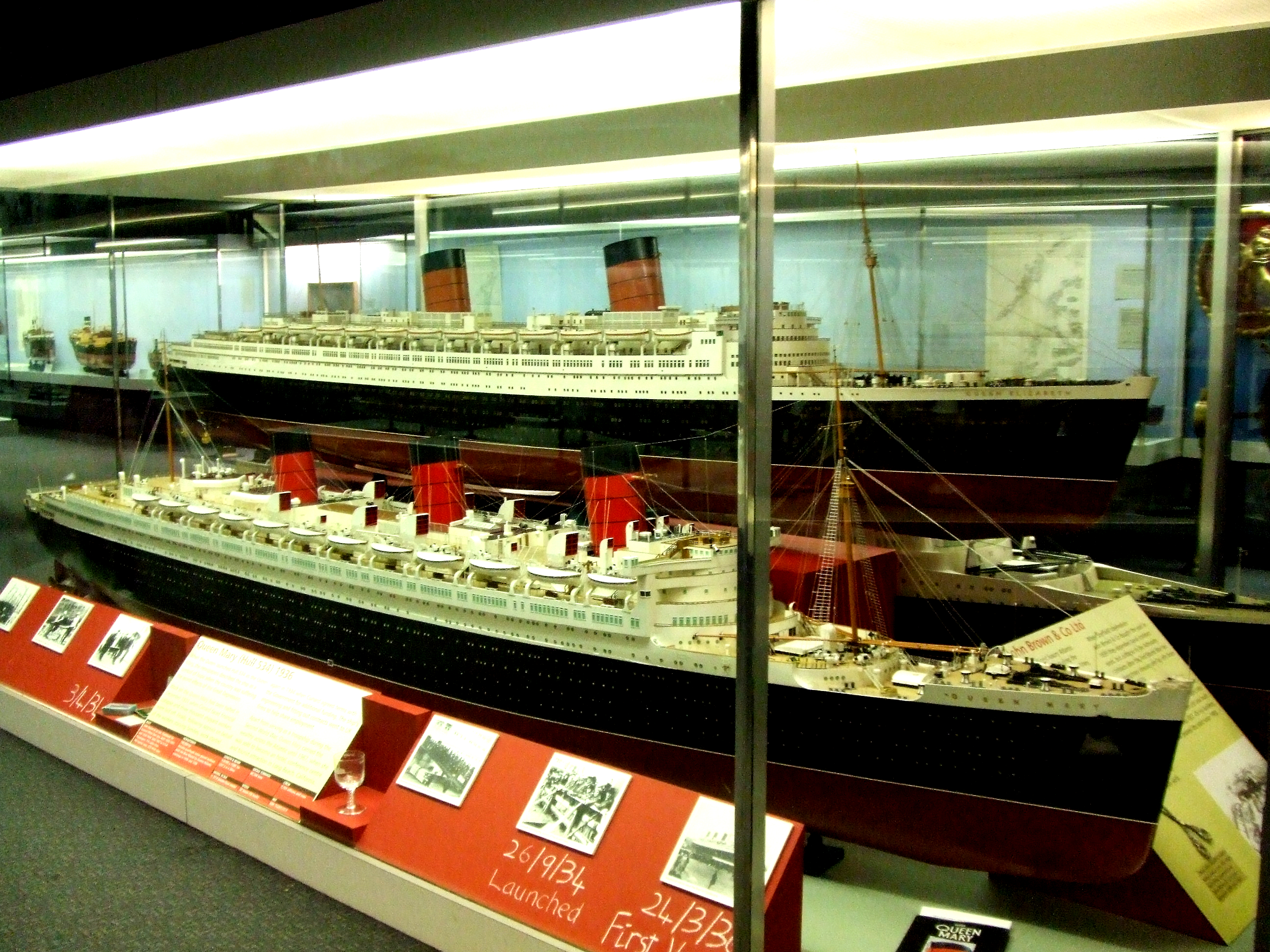
Models of Queen Mary (foreground) and Queen Elizabeth (background) in the Clyde Room (Kelvin Hall)

In the Clyde Room is a display of some 250 ship models, representing the contribution of the River Clyde and its shipbuilders and engineers to maritime trade and the Royal Navy, including the Comet of 1812, the Hood, the Howe, the Queen Mary, and the Queen Elizabeth and the QE2.

=== Railway and municipal transport exhibits ===
Locomotives
Name	Class	Locomotive Type	Images	Manufacturer	Year built	Notes
Caledonian Railway Single 123	LMS 1P	Steam		Nelson and Co.	1886	Only of its class built
Highland Railway 103	Jones Goods	Steam		Sharp, Stewart and Co.	1894	Only of its class preserved
NBR 256 Glen Douglas	NBR K Class	Steam		Cowlairs railway works	1913	Only of its class preserved
G&SWR 9	G&SWR 5 Class	Steam		Glasgow, Hyde Park Works and North British Locomotive Company	1917	Only of its class preserved
South African Railways 3007	South African Class 15F	Steam		North British Locomotive Company	1944	Only of its class preserved outside of South Africa

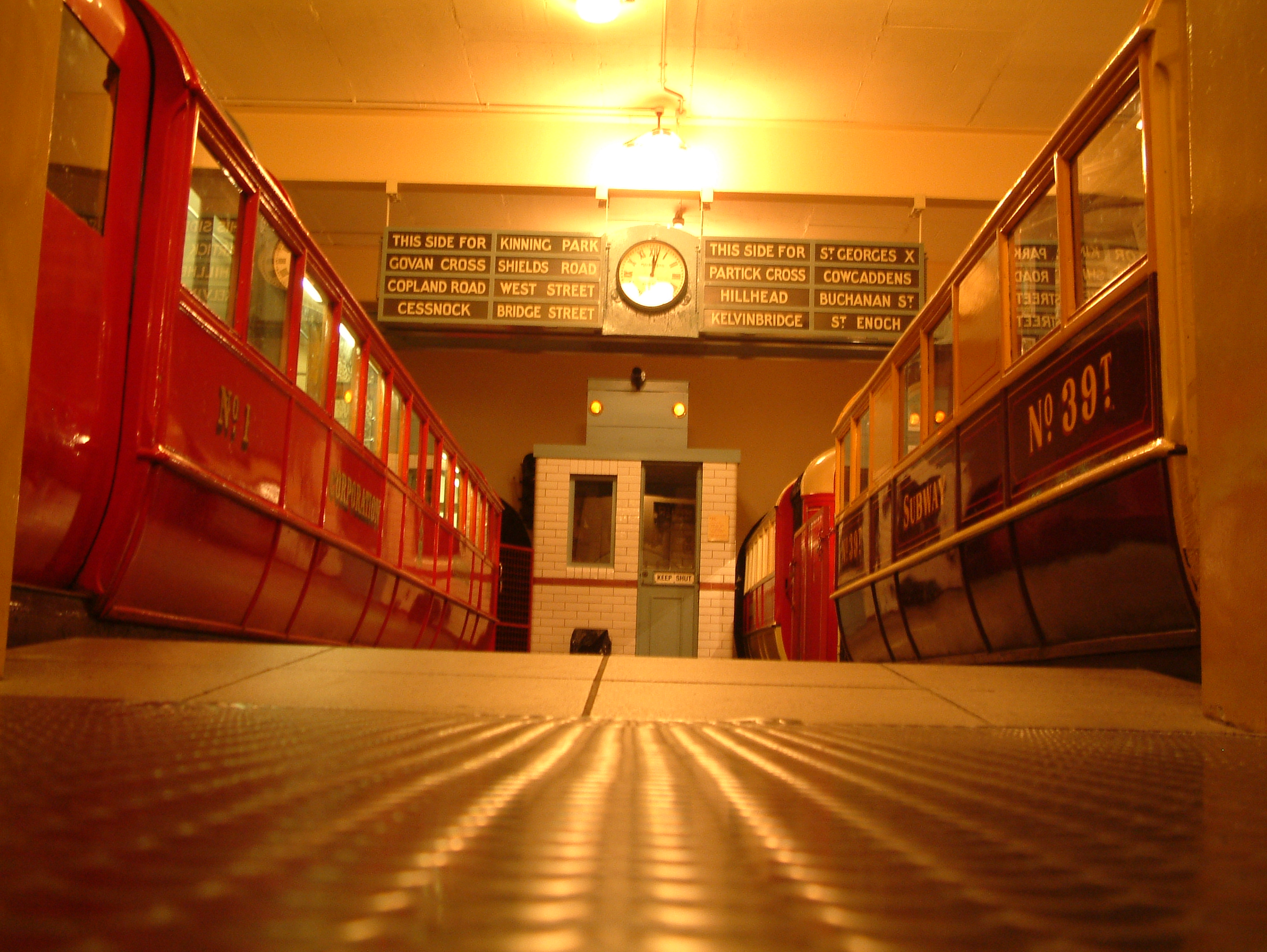
Accurate full-scale recreation of a pre-1977 Glasgow Subway station, featuring salvaged items from the former Merkland Street subway station (Kelvin Hall)

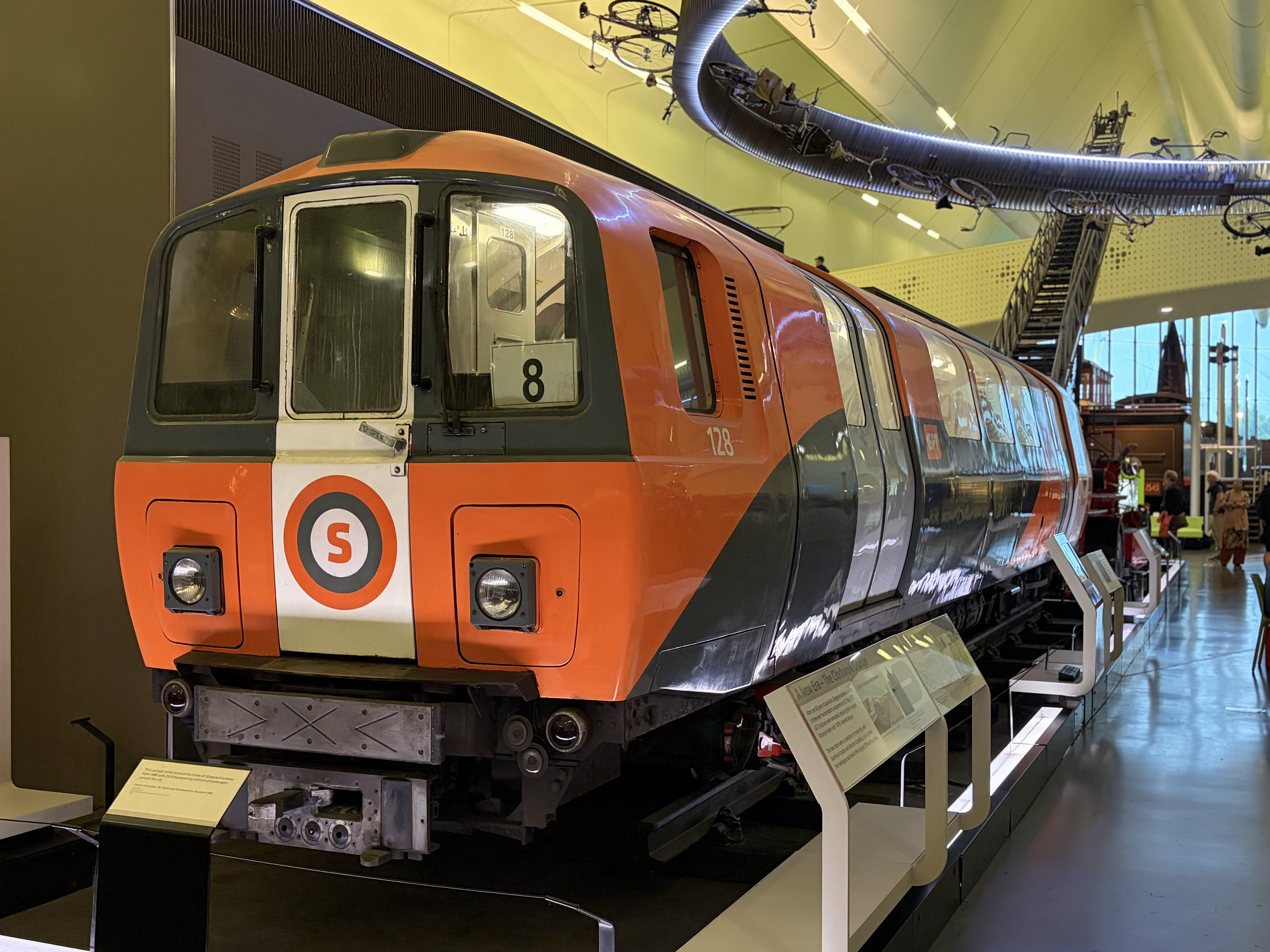
A 1980 Generation 2 subway car on display

Other main exhibits display the evolution of Glasgow's public transport system and include seven Glasgow Corporation Tramways tramcars from different eras, Glasgow Corporation trolleybuses, and the reconstruction of "Kelvin Street", which aims to recapture the atmosphere of 1930s Glasgow, including full-scale replicas of a pre-1977 Glasgow Subway station and the Regal Cinema, which plays Scottish transport documentaries such as Seawards the Great Ships. In June 2024, the museum received the 1980 "Generation 2" subway car from the Glasgow Subway.

== See also ==
- Culture in Glasgow
- Scottish Tramway and Transport Society
- A. & J. Inglis shipyard at Pointhouse Quay, where more than 500 ships have been built
- Titan Clydebank
- Scottish Maritime Museum
- List of transport museums (worldwide)
- Summerlee Museum of Scottish Industrial Life
