= Tramway (arts centre) =

Arts centre in Glasgow, Scotland

Coordinates: 55.84075°N 4.26721°W

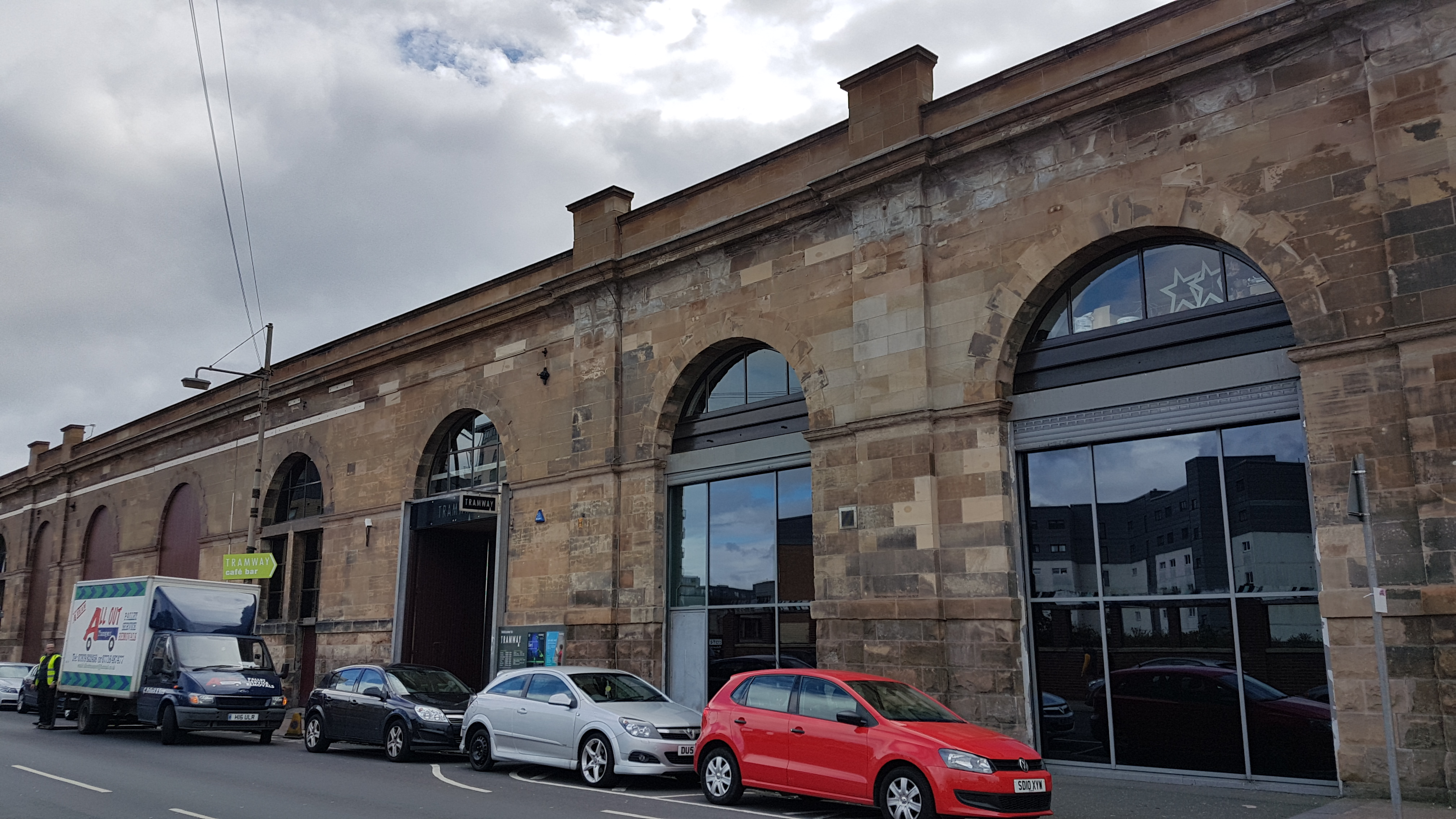
Tramway

Tramway is a contemporary visual and performing arts venue located in the Scottish city of Glasgow. Based in a former tram depot in the Pollokshields area of the South Side, it consists of two performance spaces and two galleries, as well as offering facilities for community and artistic projects. The Hidden Gardens is situated behind Tramway. The new extension to Tramway is the home of the Scottish Ballet, and is claimed to be one of the leading venues of its type in Europe.

== History ==
The Tramway occupies the former Coplawhill Glasgow Corporation Tramways depot. The original horse tram depot was constructed in 1894, and further workshops were added between 1899 and 1912. It was converted for use as the Glasgow Museum of Transport in 1964, until the museum relocated to the Kelvin Hall in Yorkhill in 1987 before relocating in 2010 to its current home at the Riverside Museum which opened at Pointhouse in Partick in 2011. It was first used as a performance venue in 1988, with Peter Brook's The Mahabharata. In 1990, it was a prominent venue as part of the European City of Culture celebrations. It has been protected as a category B listed building since 1990.

It has hosted many leading international and Scottish performers and artists, including Robert Lepage, Douglas Gordon and Les Ballets C de la B. As well as having close links to Glasgow School of Art and the Royal Scottish Academy of Music and Drama.

Exhibitions have included the seminal new works by Christine Borland and Douglas Gordon. In Autumn 1992, Tramway hosted a seminal exhibition Read My Lips: New York AIDS Polemics (exhibition catalogue editor Nicola White), featuring Gran Fury's advertisement/poster with a photo of bi-racial men kissing.

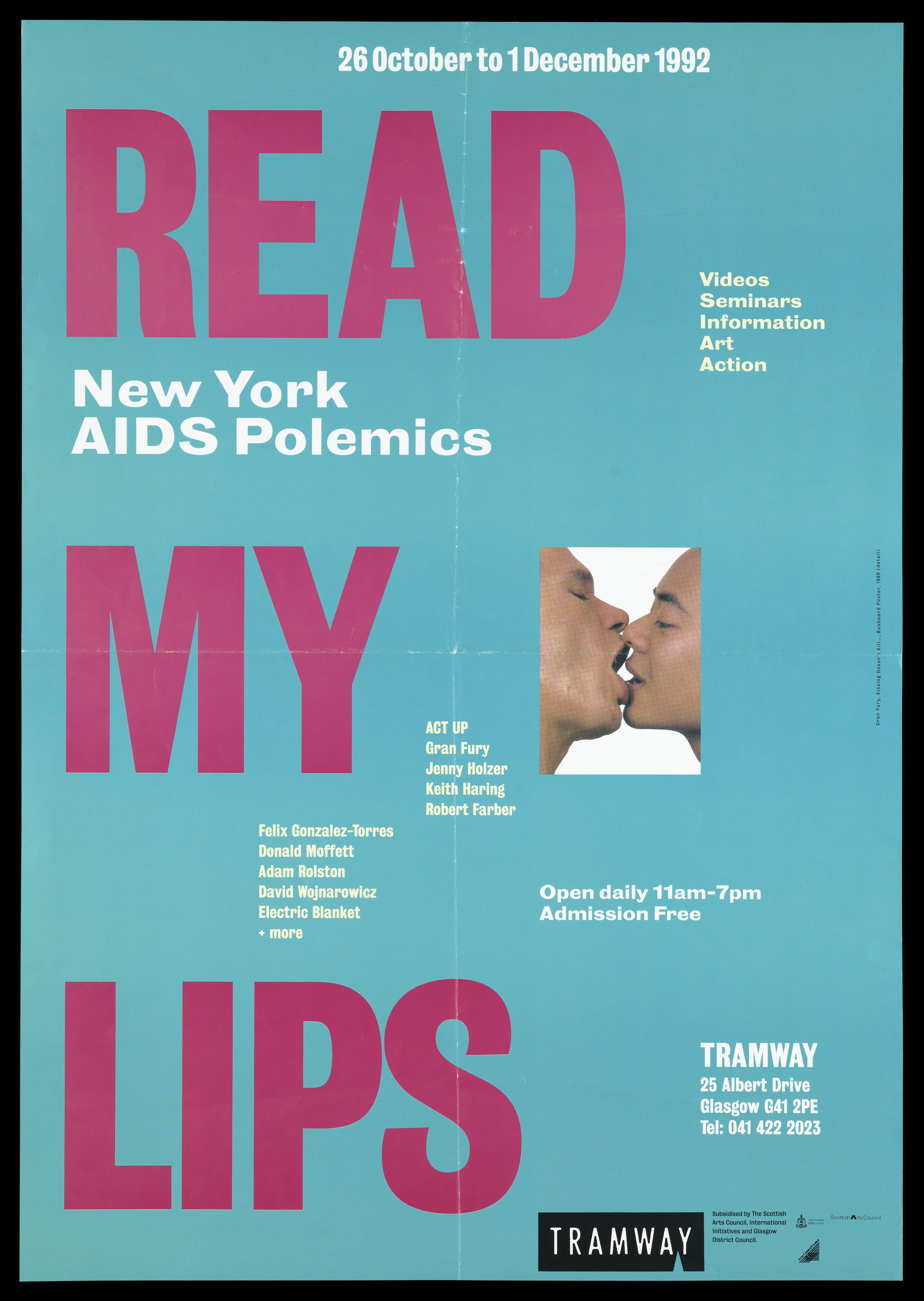
1992 advertisement for: Read My Lips: New York AIDS Polemics

Tramway also has a company for young people called Junction 25, run by Tashi Gore and Jess Thorpe of Glas(s) Performance, who have endured international tours as well as having a biannual Edinburgh Festival Fringe run. The group celebrated their tenth anniversary in March 2015. Tramway was also the base for Glas(s) Performance's 2013 project, Albert Drive.

In 2003, plans to close the arts centre and convert the building to rehearsal and ancillary space for Scottish Ballet resulted in massive opposition from the arts community and the wider public. Eventually it was decided to house the Ballet facilities in formerly derelict space to the rear of the building, retaining the arts centre in the existing structure. Scottish Ballet has moved into its new home in 2009. Sarah Munro was appointed the first General Manager of Tramway in 2008 and remains in her capacity as part of her role as Director of Glasgow Life.

In January 2013, it was announced by Tate that Tramway would host the 2015 Turner Prize.
