= Theatre Guild Glasgow =

Theatre Guild Glasgow is a non-profit company specializing in the production of musical theatre in Glasgow, Scotland.

== History ==

Theatre Guild Glasgow was formed in 1960. The company is one of Glasgow's most highly respected musical theatre groups. They quickly earned a reputation for originality and professionalism and over the years notched up many Glaswegian, Scottish, British, European and even World amateur premiers.

Towards the late 1980s they began to suffer from rising costs and falling audience numbers as the appetite for new and rarely performed musical shows dwindled. In 1993 the company was on the verge of folding following a number of large financial losses. However, a new committee was elected from the existing membership and the company was saved by a combination of fund raising (driven by founder member, Billy Love) and a change in policy regarding the production of rarely performed shows. Their first profit making show for some years was Rodgers and Hammerstein's Oklahoma! in 1995.

Today, the Theatre Guild continues to entertain Glasgow audiences in city centre venues. Famous past members include Billy Boyd (who featured in the Lord of the Rings movies).
