= Kelvin Hall =

Multi-purpose hall in Glasgow, Scotland

Coordinates: 55°52′6.58″N 4°17′38.56″W

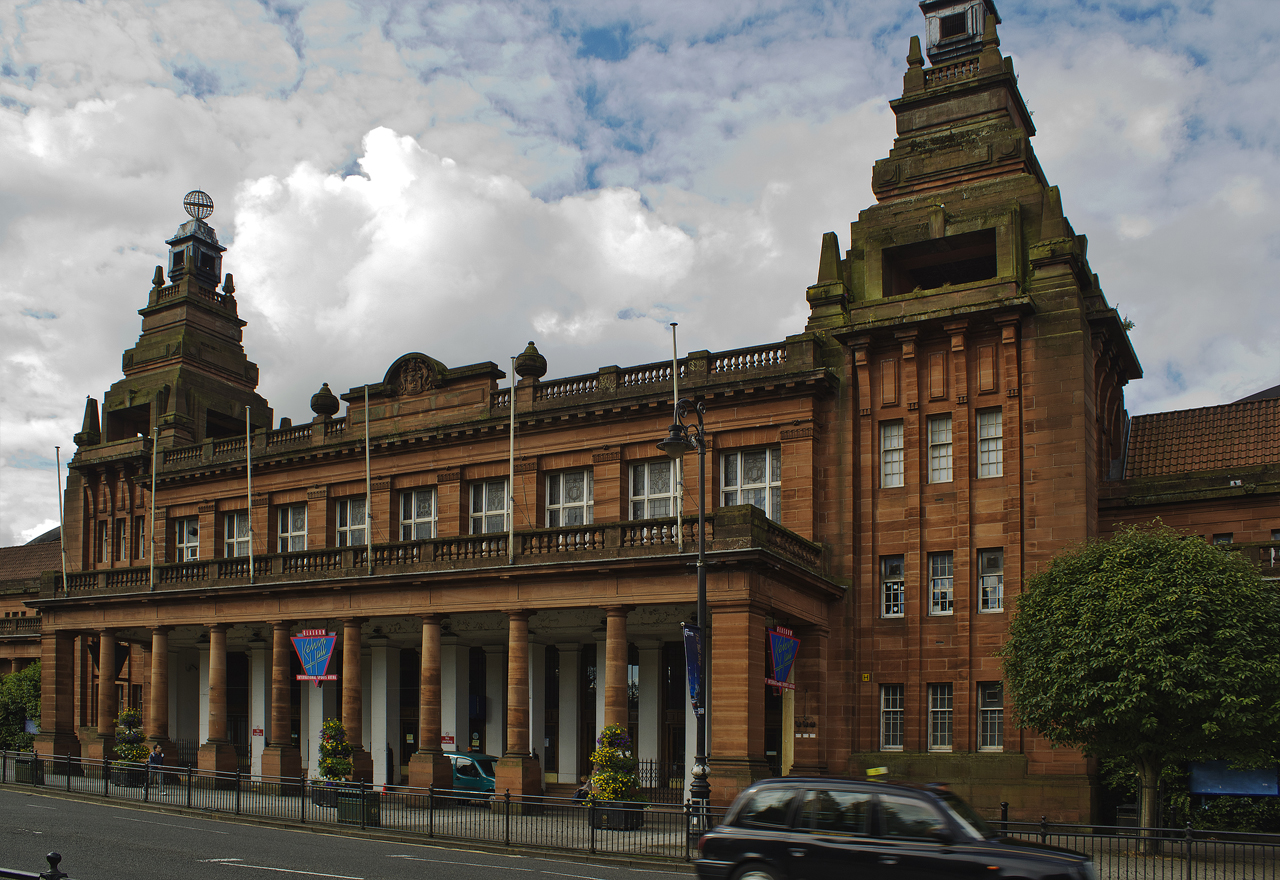
Kelvin Hall, Glasgow

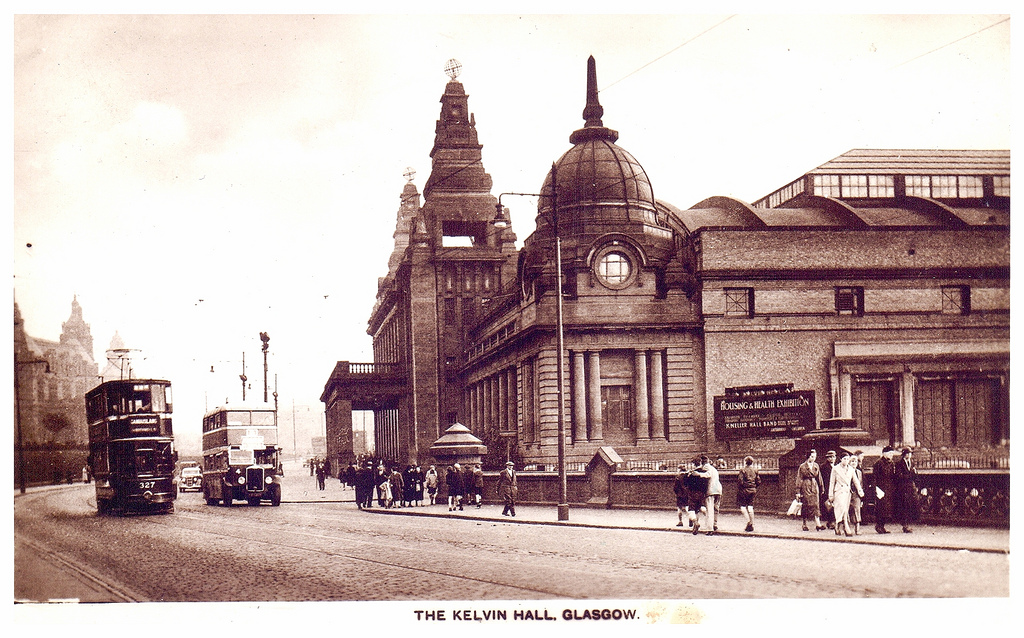
Postcard of the Kelvin Hall, Glasgow with Kelvingrove Museum & Art Galleries opposite, in the 1930s

The Kelvin Hall, located on Argyle Street in the Yorkhill area of Glasgow, Scotland, is one of the largest exhibition centres in Britain and now a mixed-use arts and sports venue that opened as an exhibition venue in 1927. It has also been used as a concert hall, home to the Kelvin Hall International Sports Arena from 1987 to 2014, and from 1987 to 2010, Glasgow's Museum of Transport. As part of the economic redevelopment of Greater Glasgow promoted by the Scottish Development Agency and local authorities to enhance the city's tourist infrastructure and to attract further national and international conferences, the Scottish Exhibition and Conference Centre was designed as the Hall's successor for exhibitions and entertainments, built in 1983 and opened on the nearby Queen's Dock in 1985 with an exhibition area equal in size to the Kelvin Hall but with the benefit of extensive car parks and land for other complementary buildings. The Hall is protected as a category B listed building, and is served by city bus services and by Kelvinhall subway station.

== History ==
The Kelvin Hall stands on the banks of the River Kelvin, opposite the Kelvingrove Art Gallery and Museum in the West End of Glasgow. It was designed to complement the municipal display of Kelvingrove Park, in particular the nearby Gallery and Museum. Fronted in red sandstone with a palatial entrance piazza, the immense steel-framed building dates from 1927. Its predecessor on part of the site, also known as the Kelvin Hall, was constructed on the cinder-based football areas of the Bunhouse Grounds, owned by the Incorporation of Bakers of Glasgow as a temporary hall using brick, wood and iron, and was opened in August 1918 to house the second British Industries Fair in the city. The new structure was designed by Robert James Walker, the leading architect of the Scottish Exhibition of National History, Art and Industry of 1911 held in Kelvingrove Park. The hall was then taken over by the military authorities as a clothing store. As soon as it was released in 1919 the Corporation of Glasgow bought it and the adjacent government building, formerly the indoor West End Roller Skating Rink which also housed flower shows and community exhibitions, used from 1914 for the manufacture of munitions on the remainder of the Bunhouse Grounds, all upon the site of the timber-constructed Machinery Exhibition Hall of the Glasgow International Exhibition of 1901 centred on Kelvingrove Park. From 1918 and 1919 until the Hall was destroyed by fire in 1925, British Industry Fairs and various exhibitions, were held, also flower shows, circuses and carnivals, with the surpluses being paid into the Common Good. The new Kelvin Hall covers 6 acres and was designed to house large-scale exhibitions and events. It was built for Glasgow Corporation in 1926-1927 and was designed by Thomas Somers Glasgow's Master of Work and City Engineer, assisted by Thomas Gilchrist Gilmour. Thomas Somers also designed the new bridge over the Clyde at Oswald Street, known as the King George V Bridge, which was also declared open by King George V on the same day, 12 July 1927.

== Former uses ==
=== Exhibition Centre and Concert Venue ===
The building has housed major concerts, trade and medical conferences, Scottish industrial exhibitions, the British industrial exhibitions of the 1951 Festival of Britain, motor shows, modern homes exhibitions, civic and sporting rallies, world championship boxing, rock concerts, several seasons of the Royal Scottish National Orchestra's Proms and the annual Kelvin Hall Circus and Carnivals (1920s to 1980s) with lions, tigers and African elephants. During the Second World War, it was converted into a factory for barrage and convoy balloons. At the 1955 Billy Graham Crusade, Graham preached daily for six weeks to an estimated aggregate congregation of 180,000. Jim Watt's famous world lightweight-title fight took place in April 1979 when he took over Roberto Durán's title. He subsequently fought three more times as world champion at the Kelvin Hall in 1979 and 1980.

The earliest rock concert was possibly that of Jerry Lee Lewis in 1964. He was supported by The Animals, who were booed off. Lewis also played at the venue on 23 April 1972. Ella Fitzgerald and the Count Basie Orchestra also played at the Kelvin Hall. The late 1960s and the 1970s were the key years for concerts including the Kinks, who issued a live recording of their 2 April 1967 date entitled Live at Kelvin Hall. Between 1972 and 1977 Glaswegians saw Manitas de Plata's Farewell Tour on 8 March 1972, Elton John, Yes on 5 September 1972, Focus 12 May 1973, Captain Beefheart, Richie Havens, The New Seekers, Johnny Mathis on 7 September 1973, Runrig's debut concert (in 1973), The Incredible String Band, and the James Last Orchestra. As part of their 1974 British Tour, Tangerine Dream played a live concert on 20 November 1974. Mike Oldfield with the (then) Scottish National Orchestra played Tubular Bells on 5 September 1975. The Royal Scottish National Orchestra Proms took place there up to 1990, when the new Royal Concert Hall opened in the city centre.

=== Former Museum of Transport ===
The Glasgow Museum of Transport was located in the Kelvin Hall from 1987 to 2010, attracting up to 500,000 annual visitors to its many exhibits of national and international importance. It was relocated to the Riverside Museum building which opened at Glasgow Harbour in Partick in June 2011.

=== International sports arena ===
The international sports arena has hosted international athletic events, boxing, badminton and volleyball competitions. The Scottish Rocks professional basketball team was based there for four years from the 2008–2009 BBL season to the 2011–2012 season, after which the team moved to the Commonwealth Arena.

== Current Kelvin Hall ==
=== Mixed art, cultural and fitness centre ===
In 2016, a £35M redevelopment of part of the Kelvin Hall opened containing art, cultural and health and fitness activities promoted in a partnership of Glasgow City Council, Glasgow Life, the University of Glasgow, and the National Library of Scotland.

=== Proposed TV and film studio ===
Planning permission has also been granted to open a 10,500-square-foot (980-square-metre) TV and film studio in Kelvin Hall costing £11.9M, with up to £7.9M funding from the Scottish Government, to be operated by BBC Studioworks, which was due to open in 2022. The studio will include production and editing suites, dressing rooms, meeting spaces and cafe.
