= Partick Library =

Library in Glasgow, Scotland

Coordinates: 55°52′14″N 4°18′17″W

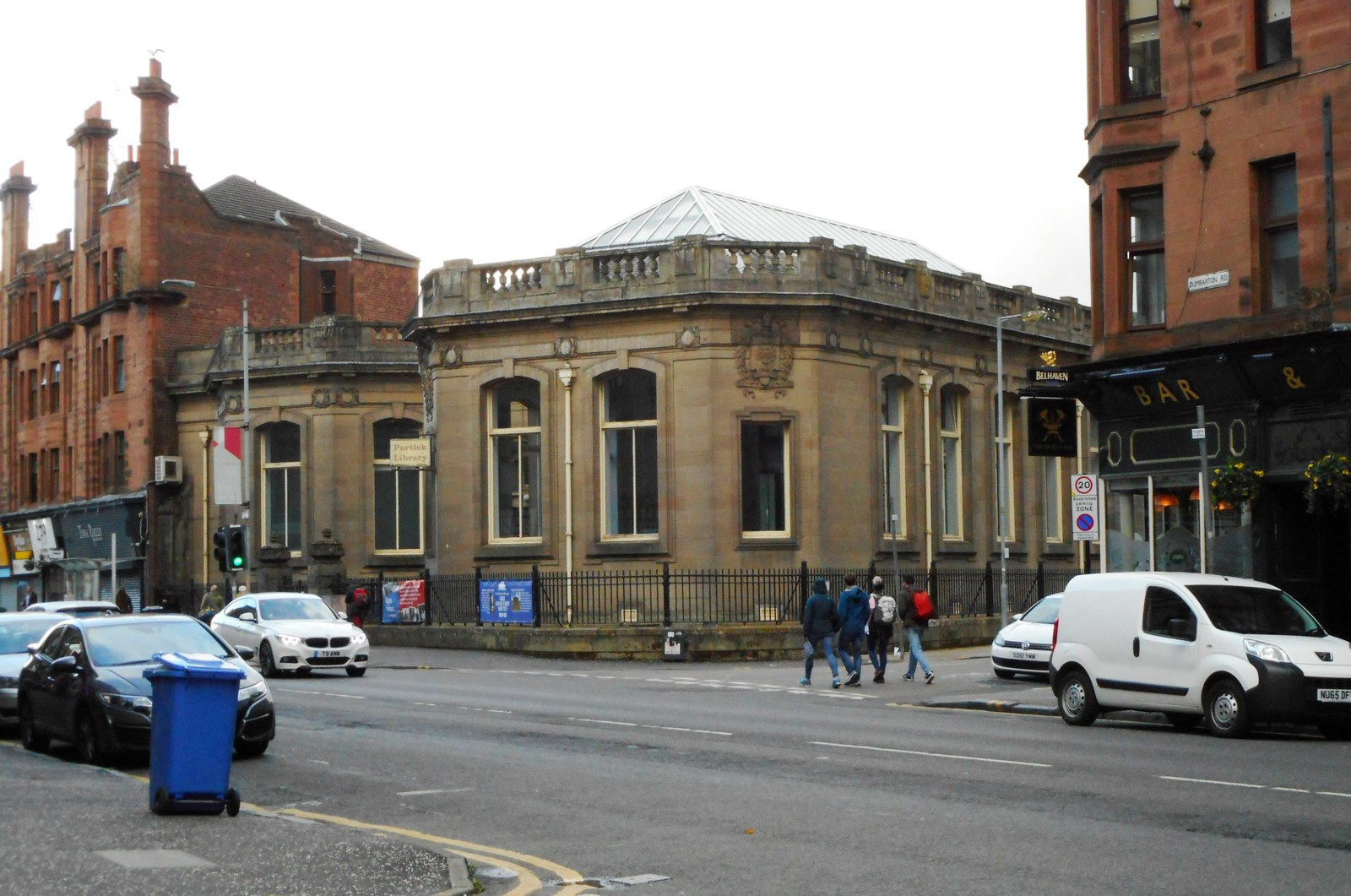
Partick Library in August 2018

Partick Library is a public library at 305 Dumbarton Road in the Glasgow district of Partick.

It was built between 1922 and 1926 by the Office of Works. A single storey building, it has a slate roof with skylights. A boundary wall with wrought iron railings surrounds the library, with its entrance marked by stone piers. The interior is noted for its plasterwork, with coving and corniced ceilings. It was opened in 1925. It closed in December 2018 for a year-long refurbishment that cost £1.5 million and re-opened a year later. The building was re-roofed and rewired, and repairs were made to the drainage and windows. The refurbishment was funded from the £10 million Community Asset Fund of Glasgow City Council with additional funding from the Community Revenue Fund.

The library features Glasgow Library's first 'sensory nook' which was described by the Glasgow Times as a "special multisensory reading space for young people with additional needs"; it was created during its 2019 refurbishment.

In a typical week the library has requests for 1500 books and welcomes 2500 visitors; 133,000 visitors were recorded in 2018.
