= Glenlee (ship) =

1896 steel-hulled three-masted barque

Coordinates: 55°51′52.1″N 4°18′25.0″W

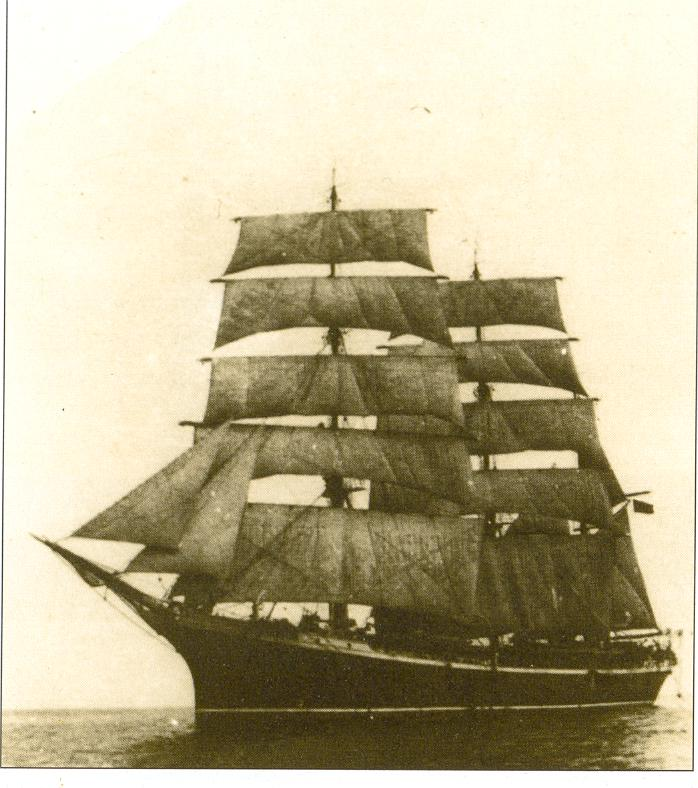
- Glenlee as Galatea in 1922 at Cartagena Harbour

History

United Kingdom
- Name: Glenlee (1896–1898); Islamount (1898–1919)
- Namesake: Glenlee, Dumfries and Galloway
- Owner: Archibald Sterling and Co Ltd, Glasgow (1896-1898); Islamount Sailing Ship Co Ltd (Robert Ferguson & Co), Dundee (1898–1905); Flint Castle Shipping Co Ltd (Robert Thomas & Co), Liverpool (1905–1918); John Stewart & Co, London (1918–1919)
- Port of registry: Port Glasgow (1896-1898); Dundee (1898–1905); Liverpool (1905–1918); London (1918–1919)
- Builder: Anderson Rodger & Company, Bay Yard, Port Glasgow, Renfrewshire, Scotland
- Cost: £24,000 (1896)
- Yard number: 324
- Launched: 3 December 1896
- Maiden voyage: 13 December 1896
- Fate: Sold 1919

Italy
- Name: Clarastella
- Owner: Società Italiana di Navigazione Stella d'Italia
- Port of registry: Genoa
- Acquired: 1919
- Fate: Sold 1922

Spain
- Name: Galatea
- Namesake: Galatea
- Owner: Escuela Naval Militar de Oficiales, Spanish Navy
- Acquired: 1922
- Home port: Ferrol (1922–1981); Seville (1981–1993)
- Fate: Sold 1993

United Kingdom
- Name: Glenlee
- Owner: Clyde Maritime Trust, Glasgow
- Acquired: 1993
- Home port: Glasgow
- Status: Museum ship

General characteristics
- Type: Three-masted barque
- Tonnage: 1,613 gross register tons (GRT); 1,488 NRT
- Displacement: c. 2,990 tons
- Length: 201 ft (61 m) LBP; 282 ft (86 m) LOA; 223 feet (68 m) LOD (length on deck); 245.5 feet (74.8 m) LOH (length of hull)
- Beam: 37.5 ft (11.4 m)
- Depth of hold: 22.5 ft (6.9 m)
- Propulsion: 2 x Ansaldo Diesels - 220HP (1921-1950); 2 x Polar Atlas Diesels - 640HP (1950-Present)

Glenlee is a steel-hulled three-masted barque, built as a cargo ship at Port Glasgow under that name in 1896 for Glasgow owners. With later owners she was named Islamount and Clarastella. From 1922 she was the sail training ship Galatea in the Spanish Navy. Since 1993, carrying her original name, Glenlee has been a museum ship at the Riverside Museum on Pointhouse Quay in the Partick area of Glasgow, known as The Tall Ship at Glasgow Harbour.

== Description ==
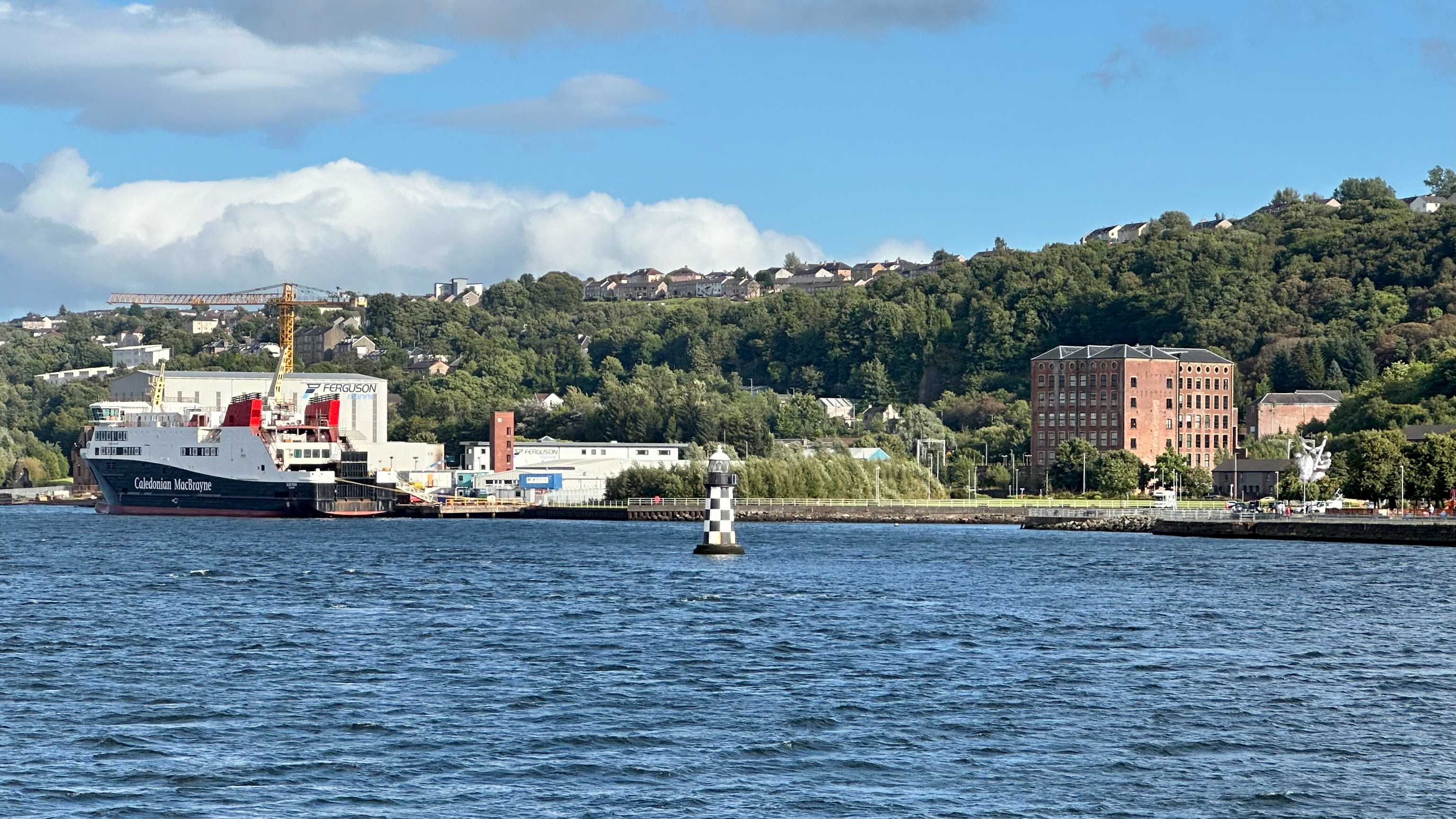
Anderson Rodger's Bay Yard was in Port Glasgow's East Harbour, in front of the Gourock Ropeworks building. The harbour is now infilled as Coronation Park, which features The Skelpies sculpture commemorating shipbuilders.

Glenlee was built by Anderson Rodger & Company at their Bay Shipyard in Port Glasgow for the Glen-line of the Glasgow shipping company Archibald Sterling & Co. Ltd., and was launched on 3 December 1896. She has a hull length of 245.5 ft (74.8 m), beam of 37.5 ft (11.4 m) and depth of 22.5 ft (6.9 m), the over-all length with the spike bowsprit is 282 ft (86 m).

She was measured at 1,613 GRT and 1,488 NRT. Rigged only with double topgallant sails over double top sails, she was not equipped with royal sails (baldheader rigging) to save costs concerning gear and seamen. As with many baldheaded sailing ships the square sails were a little wider than the sails of a standard rigging to gain sail area for a better propulsion.

== Career ==
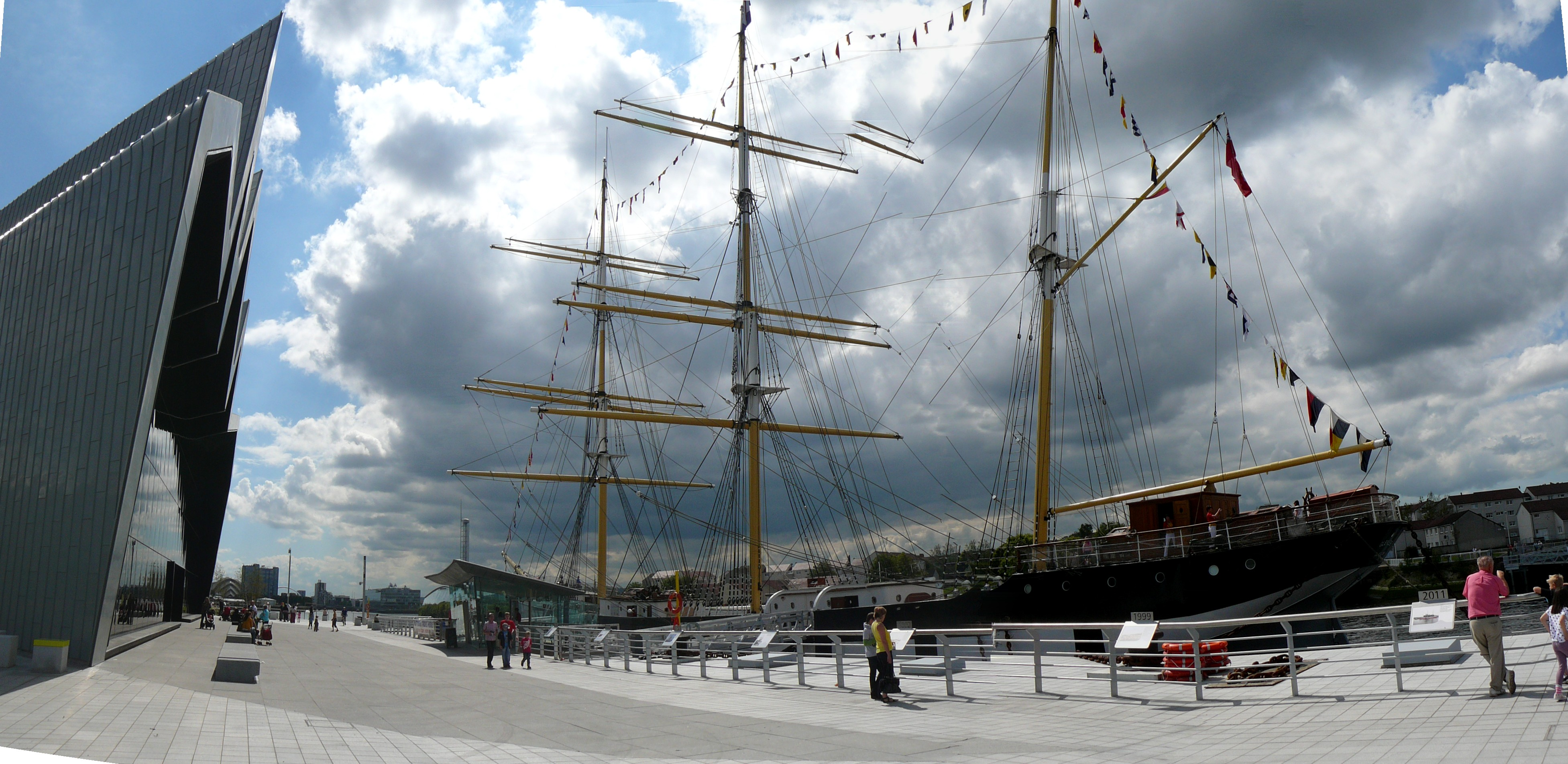
Glenlee docked at her home outside the Riverside Museum, Glasgow.

On 13 December 1896, just ten days after she was launched fully rigged and seaworthy, her maiden voyage brought her in ballast to Liverpool and from there with a general cargo to Portland, Oregon. For 23 years she traded as a bulk cargo carrier under the Red Ensign via Cape of Good Hope to Australia, returning via Cape Horn, firstly under the ownership of Archibald Sterling and Co, Glasgow, then as Islamount of Islamount Sailing Ship Co Ltd (Robert Ferguson & Co), Dundee (1898–1905), and finally with the Flint Castle Shipping Co Ltd (Robert Thomas & Co), Liverpool (1905–1918).

Islamount was renamed the Clarastella in 1919 when she changed hands to the Star of Italy Italian Shipping Company (Italian: Società Italiana di Navigazione Stella d'Italia) of Milan who registered her in Genoa. The new owner had her repaired and equipped with two 160HP Ruston Hornsby auxiliary diesel engines (1922).

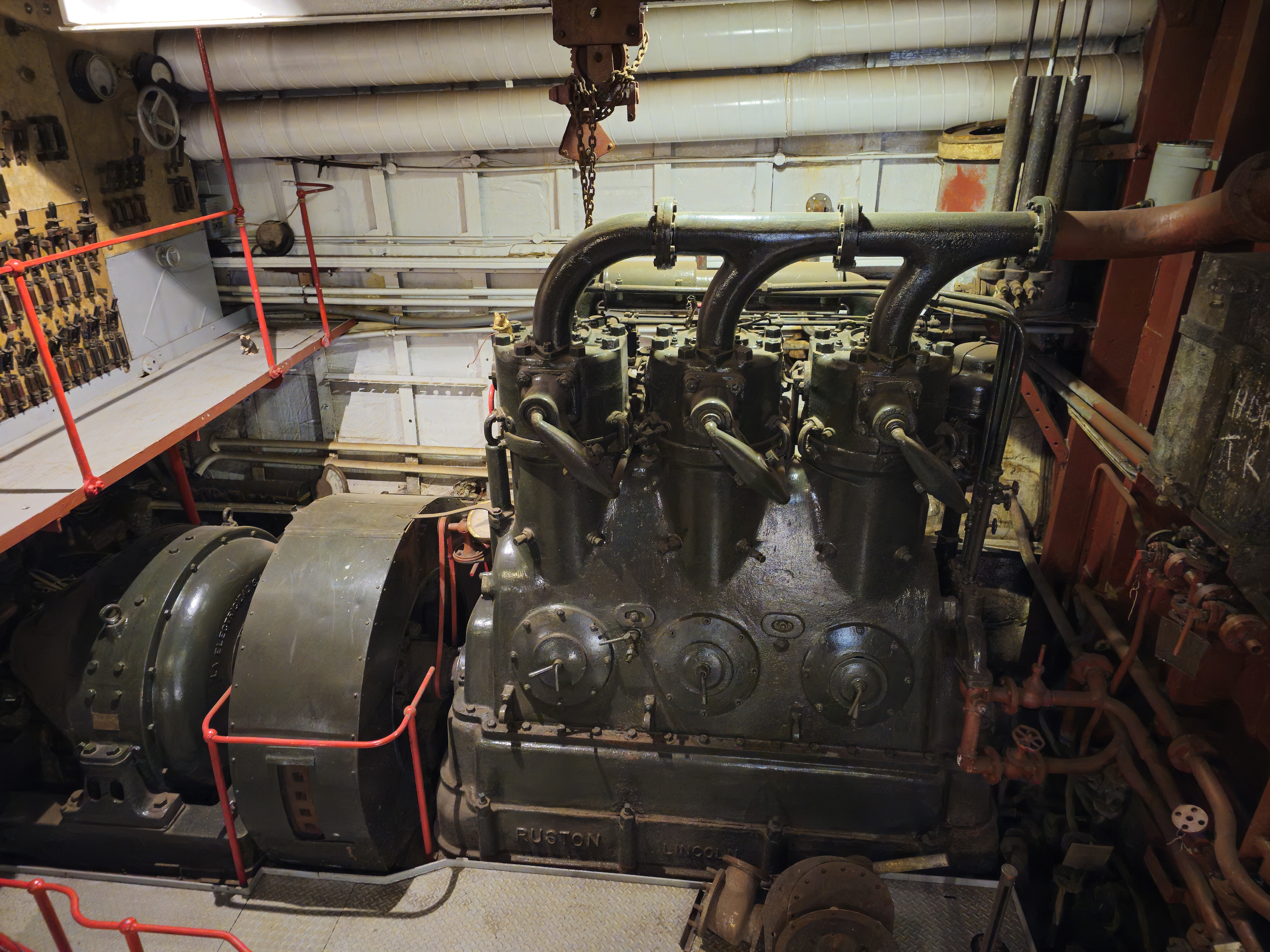
One of the two Ruston Hornsby Auxiliary Diesels

In 1922 the ship came into the hands of the Officers' Military Navy School (Spanish: Escuela Naval Militar de Oficiales) as Galatea to be used as a sail training ship. During this period the ship underwent a lot of changes to her hull and superstructure. A flying bridge was installed on the poop deck, a flying jibboom was attached to the spike bowsprit, and many other changes such as the installation of accommodation facilities for 300 cadets.

In April 1931 she became part of the Spanish Republican Navy. At the time of the coup of July 1936 she was at sea with the Spanish naval cadets. The first news of the revolt was the Madrid radio message of July 20. Commander Don Fausto Escrigas received this personally and immediately destroyed the ship's wireless so no further messages of that kind could be received. He then took the ship to Tenerife in the Canary Islands which were controlled by the Nationalists. Impressed by the guns of the fort there, the ship's personnel consented to join the Nationalist cause. The addition of the Galatea to the Nationalist Navy was of great importance. Since the bulk of the Spanish Navy was Republican, the greatest need of the Nationalists was trained seamen. The crew of the Galatea were experienced in training officers and men and turned speedily to the task the Nationalists gave them. According to Nationalist figures, over 4,000 persons were trained in the Galatea operating out of Cádiz during the three years of the war.

== Preservation ==
After more than 47 years of service as a sail and later on as a stationary training ship she was first laid up in A Graña, Ferrol, her Spanish port of registry. In 1981 the underwater hull was re-plated at the drydock in Ferrol. Later Galatea was completely de-rigged down to a hulk and was towed to Seville to be used as a floating museum.

In any case, the ship had deteriorated so far that it was eventually decided to scrap her. In 1990 a British naval architect (Dr. Sir John Brown, 1901–2000) discovered the ship and in 1993 she was rescued from being scrapped and subsequently bought by the Clyde Maritime Trust at auction for 5,000,000 ₧ or £40,000. After making the hull seaworthy (all openings on deck were closed and the flying bridge spanning the poop deck during her service in Spain and the attached flying jibboom were removed) the ship was returned to Glasgow months later in tow from Seville.

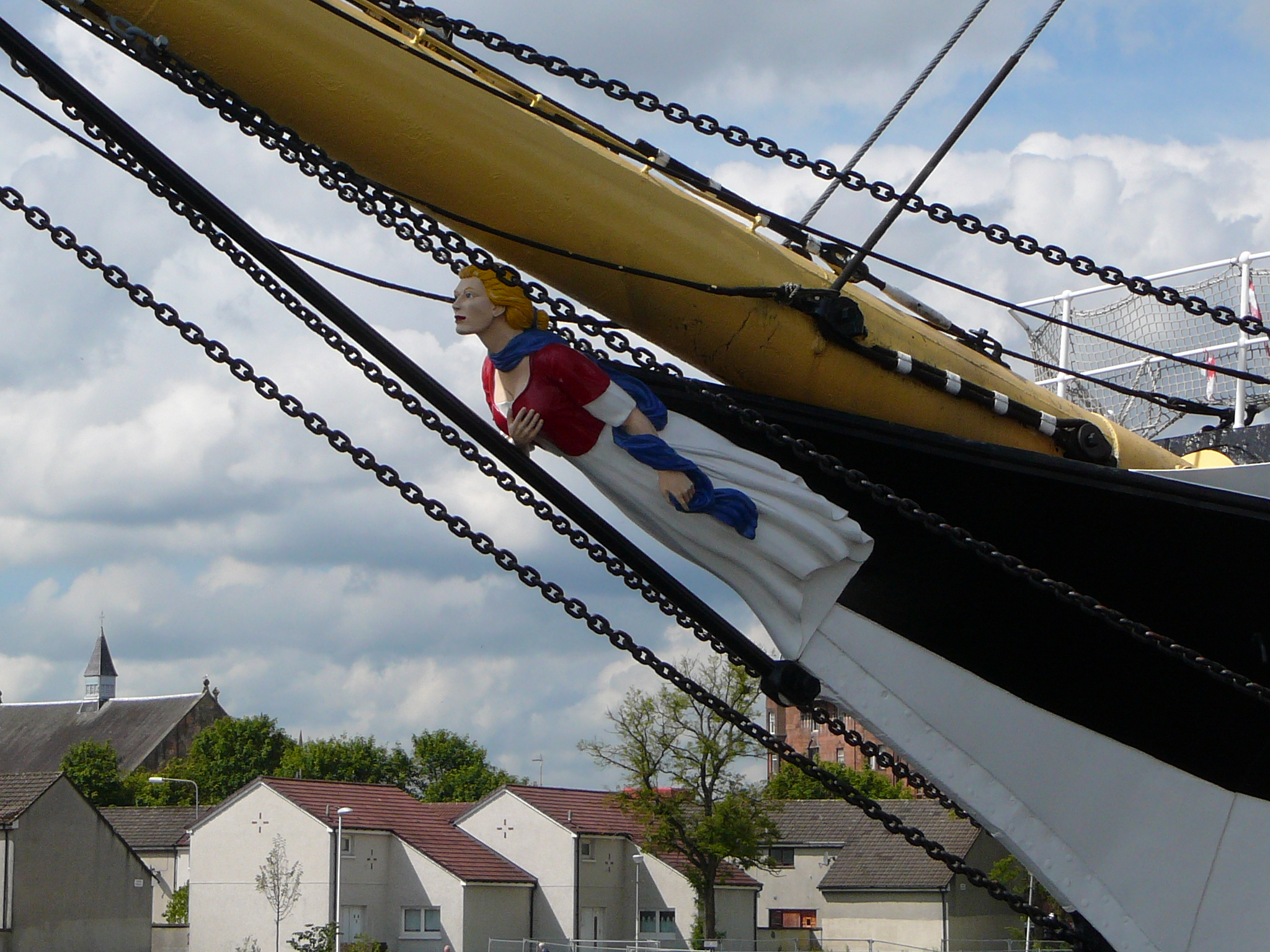
Glenlee's figurehead "Mary Doll".

After preliminary works in dry-dock such as the removal of the unnecessary propellers, the check and repair of all the plates below the waterline and new paint, a six-year-long process of restoration began including a new cut wooden figurehead, a complete set of new rigging including the re-assembling and re-stepping of her original masts and re-crossing of the old yards (1998), as well as many other replacements (original deckhouses) and repairs. Her old masts and many of the old yards, which still existed somewhere in Spain, were returned by the Spanish when they realised that the old ship would be really renewed to her original "Cape Horn status", painted grey again with "gun ports". Her propellers are now situated in the courtyard by the yard arm of the City Of Glasgow College, Nautical Faculty by the River Clyde.

Its owners tried to recover the original figurehead, which remains on display in La Graña, Ferrol (La Coruña) and, failing to do so, a replica was commissioned for 12,000 euros. The answer given in a sarcastic tone was that the figurehead would not be returned until the British returned Gibraltar.

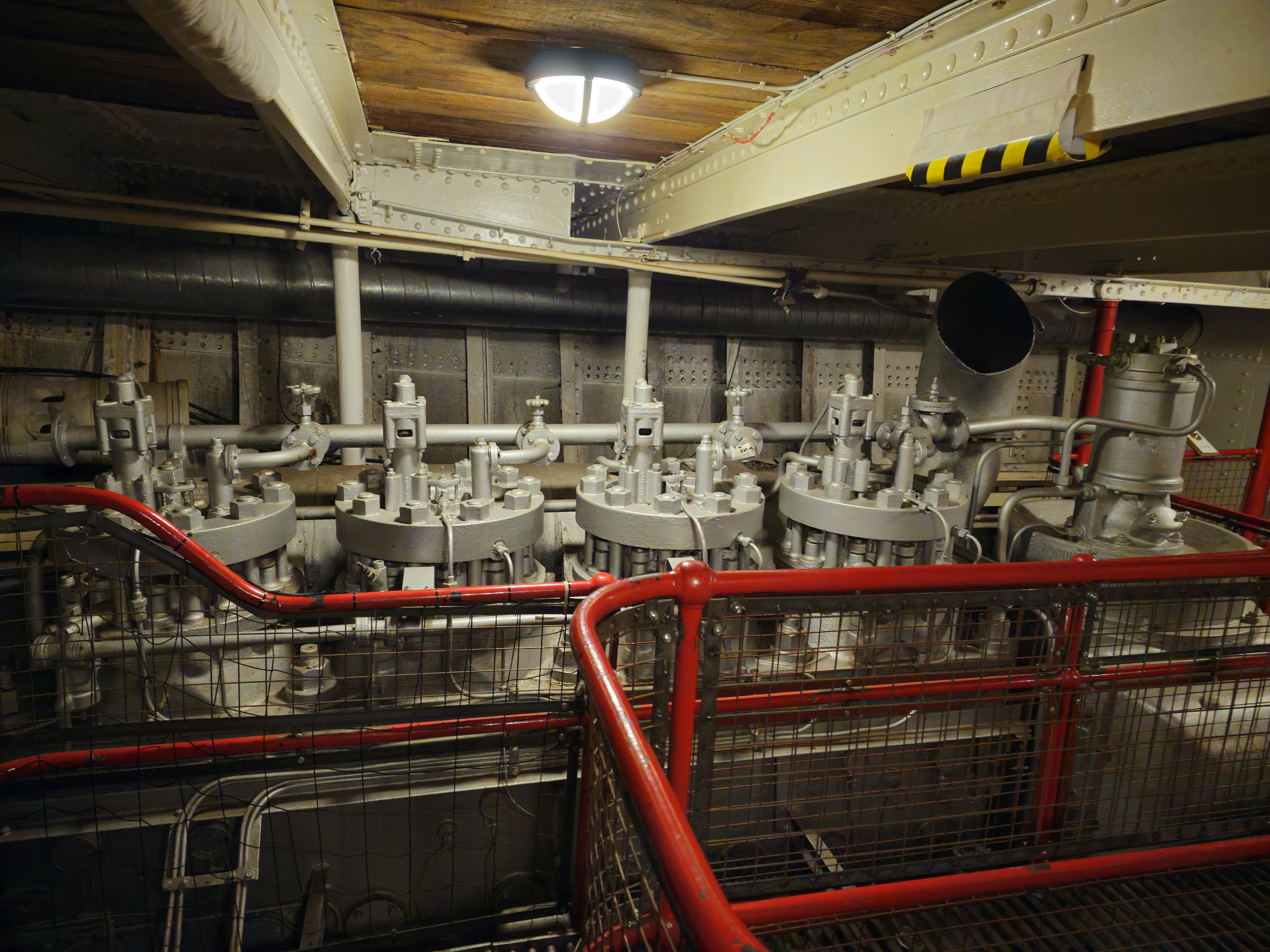
Glenlee Ship Engine Room - 1 of 2 Polar Atlas Diesels

Apart from the hull, the ship had to be rebuilt. All changes made to the ship by the Spanish and previous owners were to be removed, such as all the cabins built for the trainees and the scrap iron ballast in the frames of the holds. First she was given back her original name, Glenlee, by the Lord Provost of Glasgow on 6 July 1993 when the ship arrived in Glasgow for the first time since her launch in 1896. Glenlee is now recognised as part of the National Historic Fleet.

As a museum ship and tourist attraction, Glenlee offers educational programmes, events including exhibitions and is a venue for the West End Festival and volunteering opportunities. Since June 2011, the ship has been open at Glasgow's Riverside Museum.
