= Rosshall =

Area of Glasgow

Coordinates: 55.839888°N 4.365439°W

Rosshall: Scottish Gaelic: Càrn
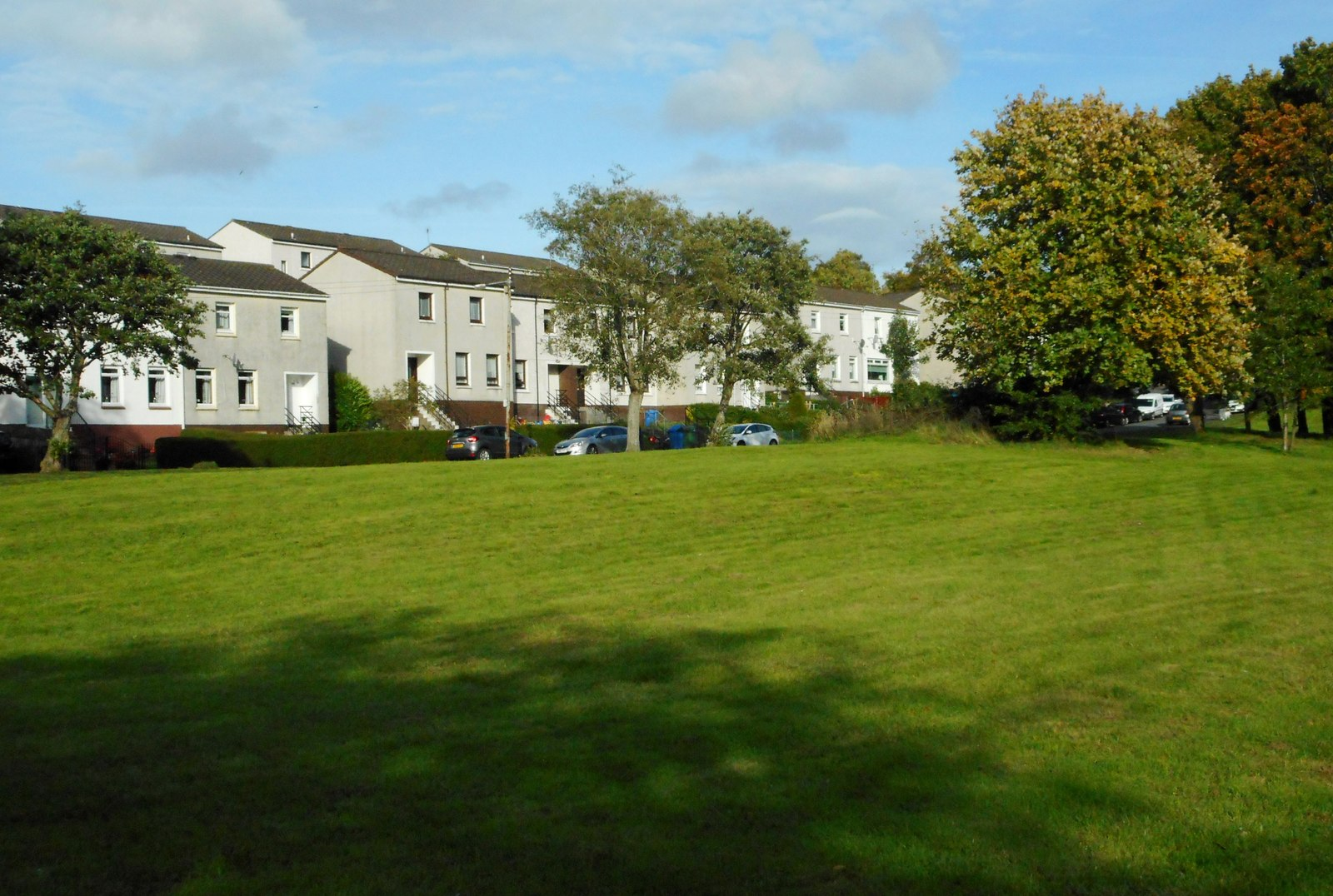
- Green space on the banks of the White Cart, looking towards Cairnhill Circus

- Location within Glasgow
- Population: 700
- OS grid reference: NS518633
- Council area: Glasgow City Council
- Lieutenancy area: Glasgow
- Country: Scotland
- Sovereign state: United Kingdom
- Post town: Glasgow
- Postcode district: G52 3
- Dialling code: 0141
- Police: Scotland
- Fire: Scottish
- Ambulance: Scottish
- UK Parliament: Paisley and Renfrewshire North
- Scottish Parliament: Glasgow Pollok

Rosshall is an area in the south-west of Glasgow, Scotland, within the Cardonald ward of Glasgow City Council. It has a fairly isolated location, with the White Cart Water forming a border to the south and east, the Paisley Canal Line railway to the north, and open fields to the west that form a short green belt between Glasgow and the large town of Paisley – the nearest building 500 yards (460 m) to the west, Rosshall Mains Farm, falls under Paisley administration rather than Glasgow.

== Description ==
The origin of the name derives from the Ross family who owned the surrounding Hawkhead estate from the 13th to the end of the 19th century.

In addition to a small cluster of post-World War II housing surrounding a nursery school, the main features of the area include the Rosshall Academy secondary school (built there in 2002 due to its central location between the two schools being merged to form it, at Penilee to the north and Pollok to the south).

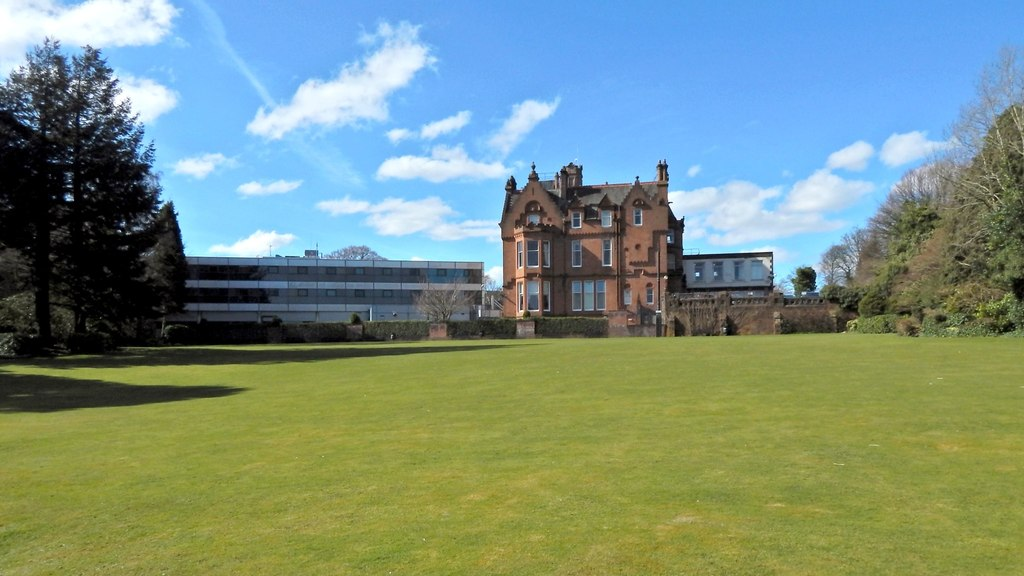
Ross Hall Hospital as seen from Rosshall Park

Ross Hall Hospital, now a private healthcare facility, is based in the former country house of the same name (built 1877, at one time the residence of the owner of the Lobnitz shipyards on the River Clyde), later the 'Scottish Hotel School' linked to the University of Strathclyde. According to residents of Cairnhill, the houses in the area used to be part of a care in the community scheme for patients from Leverndale Hospital. However, this is merely a matter of speculation and folklore in Cairnhill.

Rosshall Park (purchased by the city and opened to the public in the 1960s) was created from the estate grounds of the current mansion and includes the ruined remains of its predecessor 'Ross Hill'. National Cycle Route 7 runs through the park, which has a Category B listed walled rock garden designed by James Pulham and Son. The estate's red sandstone stables block off the main road was adapted into apartments in the 1990s, Opposite the stables block on the main road is a gastro pub, 'The Pines', a converted black-and-white painted Tudor-style mansion and physician's residence / surgery which has had its present function for several decades.

Rosshall is part of the wider Crookston area which includes two distinct localities, one immediately to the north of Rosshall including Crookston railway station and formed mostly by large suburban villas developed in the late 19th century, with the neighbourhoods of Ralston (in Renfrewshire) and Cardonald (in the City of Glasgow) at either end, and the other part – to the south of Rosshall via the Howford Bridge over the White Cart which also leads to Pollok and Crookston Castle – comprising a sprawling development of modern suburban housing, including the original buildings of Leverndale Hospital now converted into apartments.
