= Crookston, Glasgow =

Suburb of Glasgow, Scotland

Coordinates: 55.842780°N 4.368377°W

Crookston: Scottish Gaelic: Baile Cruic; Scots: Cruixtoun
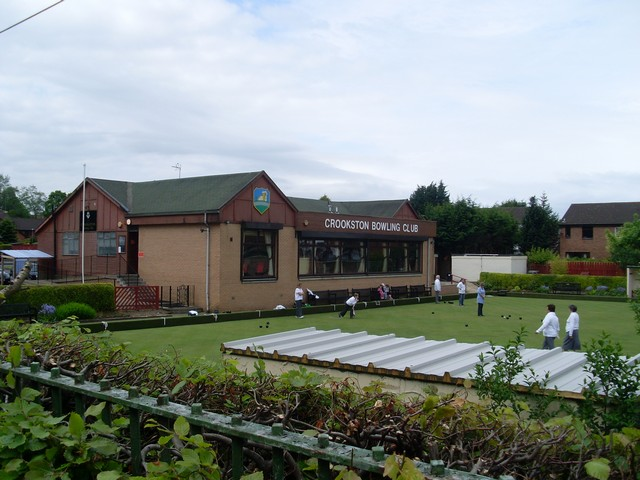
- Crookston Bowling Club

- Location within Glasgow
- OS grid reference: NS518636
- Council area: Glasgow City Council
- Lieutenancy area: Glasgow
- Country: Scotland
- Sovereign state: United Kingdom
- Post town: GLASGOW
- Postcode district: G52 3 / G53 7
- Dialling code: 0141
- Police: Scotland
- Fire: Scottish
- Ambulance: Scottish
- UK Parliament: Glasgow South West
- Scottish Parliament: Glasgow Pollok

Crookston (Scottish Gaelic: Baile Cruic, Scots: Cruixtoun) is a residential suburb on the southwestern edge of the city of Glasgow, Scotland.

Two distinct and geographically separate neighbourhoods about one mile (1.5 kilometres) apart on opposite sides of the White Cart Water are known by the Crookston name, owing to factors in their development. Both areas share the same main road (A736 Crookston Road) and fall within the same U.K. and Scottish Parliamentary constituencies (as of 2019 boundaries), but the northern area falls under the Cardonald ward for Glasgow City Council and is within the G52 postcode zone, while the southern area is in the Greater Pollok ward and the G53 postcode zone.

== History ==
=== Crookston Estate ===
The lands of Crookston were named after the feudal Anglo-Norman lord, Robert Croc who was granted the deeds by David I of Scotland, via Walter fitz Alan, in 1170 and soon built Crookston Castle (Dùn Cruic in Scottish Gaelic) on a small knoll. In addition to the first wooden version of the castle – John Stewart of Darnley had the surviving stone version built in around 1400 – Robert Croc had a chapel constructed, as well as a hospital, beginning a legacy of healthcare facilities in the area which continues to the present era.

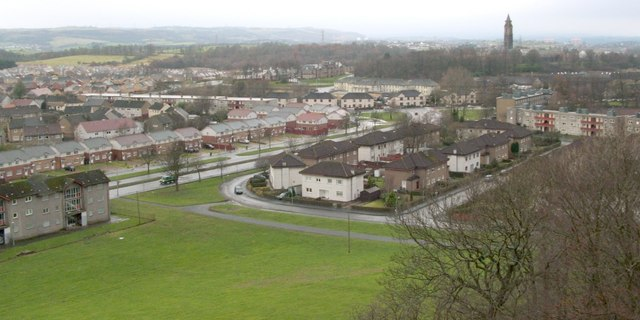
View from Crookston Castle towards west Pollok, Leverndale and Crookston Road (2005)

The area north of the castle, between the Levern Water and the White Cart Water, was forested and known as Crookston Wood (Iron Age remains were found there during a 1959 archaeological excavation), while several farms surrounding the castle also shared the name: Crookston House and Farm to its west, Nether Crookston just to its south, Old Crookston further south and Mains of Crookston to its east. The castle was captured in the mid-1500s and its importance diminished, although it was restored in the mid-19th century by the Maxwells of Pollok and was donated by the family to the National Trust for Scotland in 1931, being the first property the organisation managed.

=== Crookston Station area ===
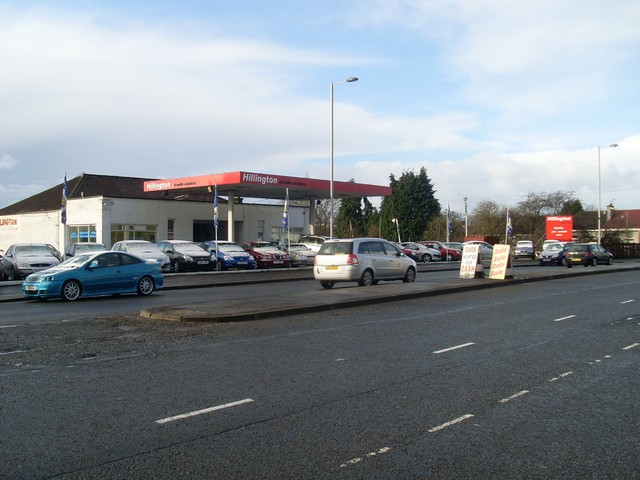
Motor trading business on Paisley Road West, just within Glasgow at its boundary with Ralston, Renfrewshire

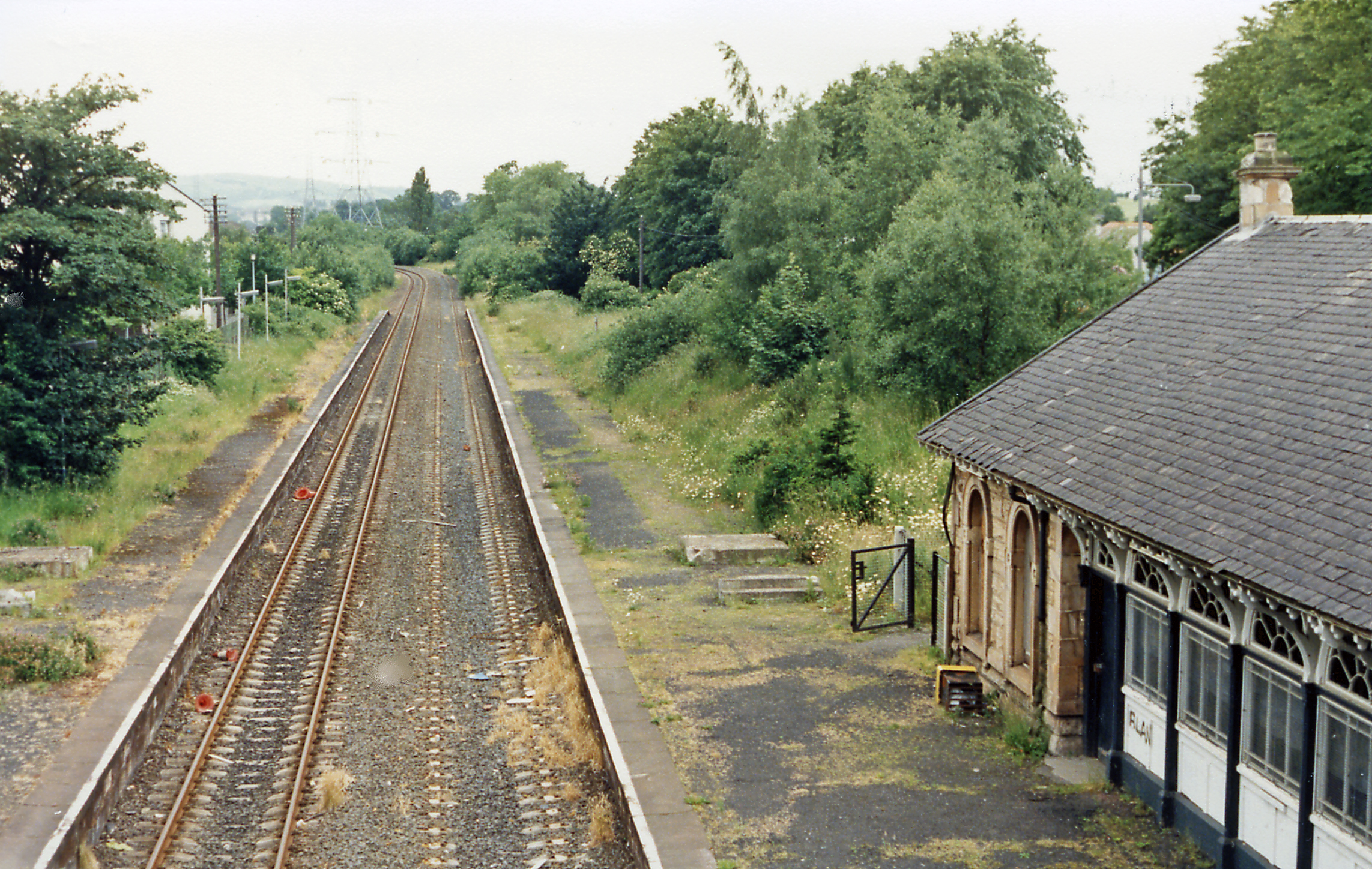
Abandoned buildings (now converted to houses) and tracks at Crookston railway station (1986)

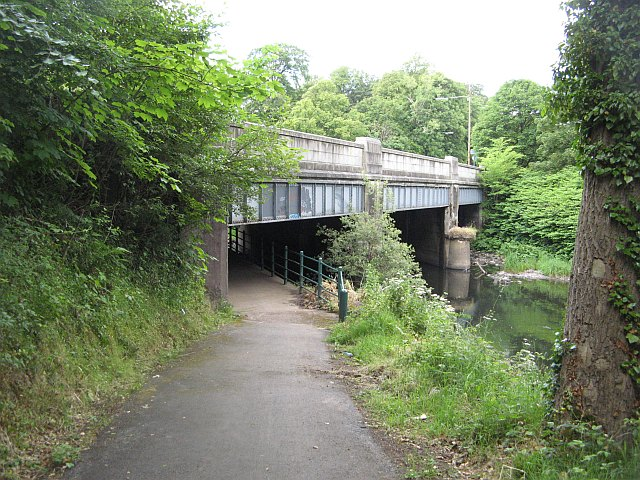
View of the White Cart Water at Howford Bridge from NCR 7 which runs beneath it

Although other names such as Cardonald, Hillington, Ingleston, Ralston and Rosshill were associated with the territory north of the White Cart river, in 1885 the Crookston name was still sufficiently prominent locally for it to be chosen as the name of a station on the Glasgow and South Western Railway's new route between Glasgow and Paisley – sited between the White Cart and the main road between the towns (A761 Paisley Road West), the tracks followed the trajectory of the abandoned Glasgow, Paisley and Johnstone Canal and was thus titled the Paisley Canal line). Over the next few decades, a small commuter suburb consisting mostly of large villas was constructed around the station, and inevitably this community became known as Crookston.

After the lands, previously within the parish of Paisley Abbey, Renfrewshire, were annexed by Glasgow Corporation in 1926, it was gradually surrounded by other residential neighbourhoods including South Cardonald, Hillington, Penilee and Rosshall within the city, also directly bordering the affluent suburb of Ralston, Renfrewshire. Several small developments of housebuilding took place within the area over various eras until almost all the land was built upon, ranging from concrete tenements, terraces of modest houses, semi-detached bungalows and flat-roofed apartment blocks, plus the converted buildings of the original station, which were abandoned after the line closed in 1983; it re-opened in 1990, but now uses only one track and platform for both directions (a small section of double track to the east of Crookston allows trains to pass one another).

In addition to an eponymous hotel (extended from a villa) on Crookston Road, there is a good provision of local shops and other services, including churches on Paisley Road West, and bowling clubs to the east at Cardonald and the west at Ralston. One of the very few pre-railway era remnants in the area is Cardonald Place Farm; a mill sited nearby was demolished in the 1930s. The nearest primary schools are in South Cardonald, as is the Catholic Lourdes Secondary School; the local nondenominational high school is Rosshall Academy, built in 2001 immediately south of the Paisley Canal railway lines and next to Ross Hall Hospital and Rosshall Public Park, beyond which is the Howford Bridge, carrying the main road south over the White Cart. The local community council covering this area is South Cardonald and Crookston CC.

=== Crookston Home and Leverndale area ===
In 1895, a lunatic asylum and hospital (known initially as Govan District Asylum, then as Hawkhead Asylum after the surrounding country estate on the periphery of Paisley) was built on a promontory near the left bank of the White Cart to the west of Crookston Road. It was expanded several times, including the incorporation of the old Hawkhead mansion and a farm for use by inmates, and was renamed Leverndale Hospital in 1964. In that period there was a separate Hawkhead Hospital located across fields to the west of Leverndale, another psychiatric facility south of that at Dykebar Hospital, and another hospital a short distance to the east at Cowglen. New buildings closer to the main road were constructed in the 1990s, and in the 2000s the older units (including the Category A listed Towerview Unit were converted to private housing. In 2011, a station for the Scottish Ambulance Service opened at the new Leverndale site, followed in 2014 by the NHS West of Scotland Mother and Baby Unit (relocated from the Southern General Hospital).

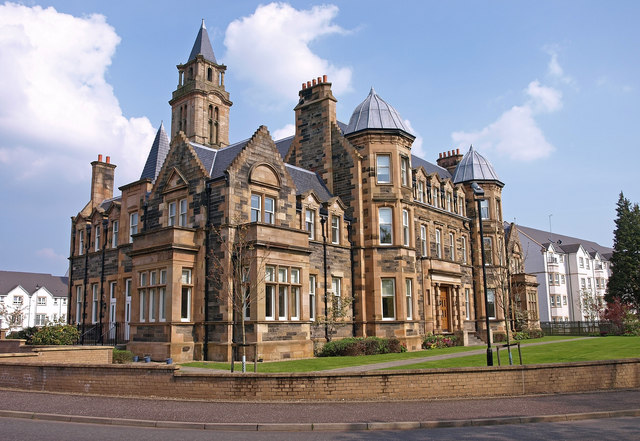
The former Towerview Unit at Leverndale Hospital, now apartments

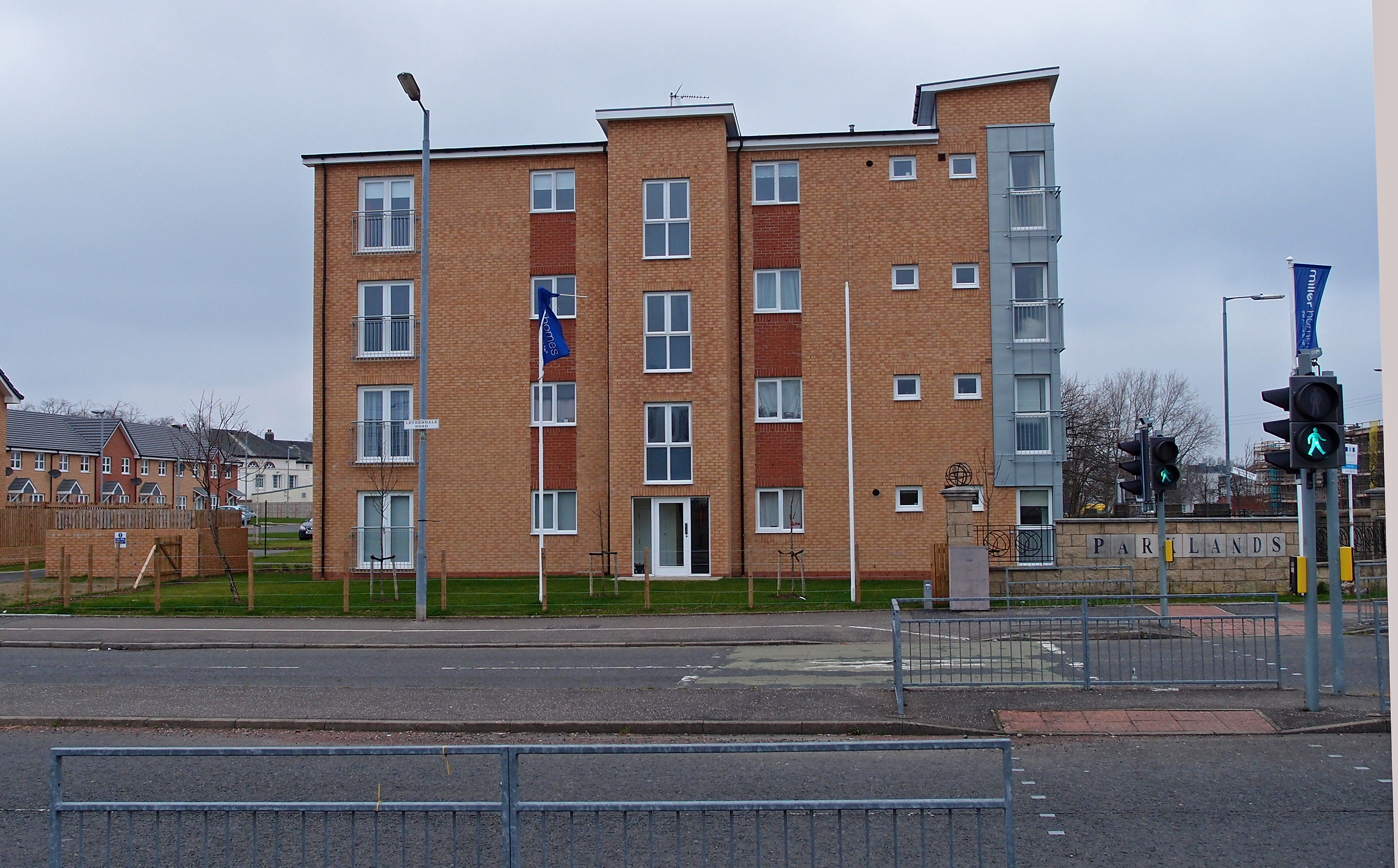
Modern apartment block near Leverndale

In 1906, Renfrewshire Combination Poorhouse was built near Old Crookston Farm to the east of Crookston Road. It was later renamed as Crookston Home Poor Law Institution, before being reconfigured as a nursing home for the elderly in 1934. Four years later, a development of 'cottage homes' (an early version of sheltered housing) was built immediately to its south, with additional care provided from the main block of the complex as required. Around the same time, a wide area of land to the east and north of the Home (within Renfrewshire's Eastwood parish) was purchased by Glasgow from the Pollok Estate for housebuilding, and after its first stage (today's 'Old Pollok') was interrupted by World War II, the large Pollok peripheral housing scheme was constructed along both banks of the Levern Water in the decade after the conflict, surrounding Crookston Castle and also occupying part of the old woodland and farms including Mains of Crookston, Byres, Nether Crookston and Crookston House – the latter, at the confluence of the White Cart and Levern Waters, became the site of Howford Special School in the mid-1960s.

In contrast to the preservation work at Leverndale, the Crookston Home facility operated until the 1990s when its functions became obsolete, and the site was then cleared for housebuilding leaving no trace of the original buildings or the cottages. There was already an existing mid-20th century development of houses at Roughmussel at the southern end of Crookston Road (along with a row of shops), and various housebuilders added clusters of suburban villas accessed from the main road from the 1990s until the 2010s, until most of the accessible land forming Glasgow's western border between Howford Bridge and Barrhead Road, a distance of over one mile (1.5 kilometres), was built upon.

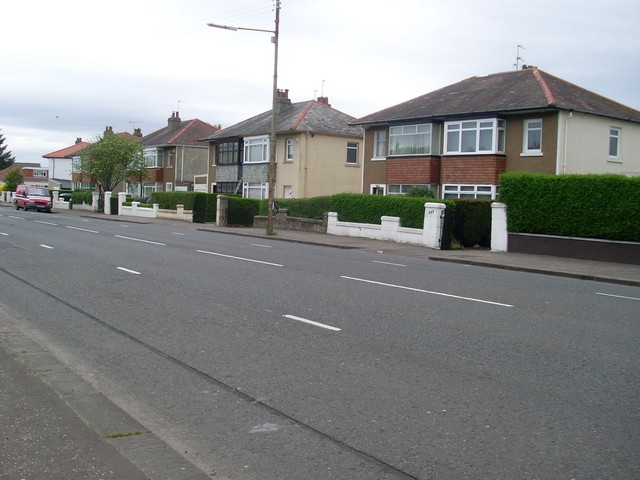
View of some of the older houses at the southern end of Crookston Road

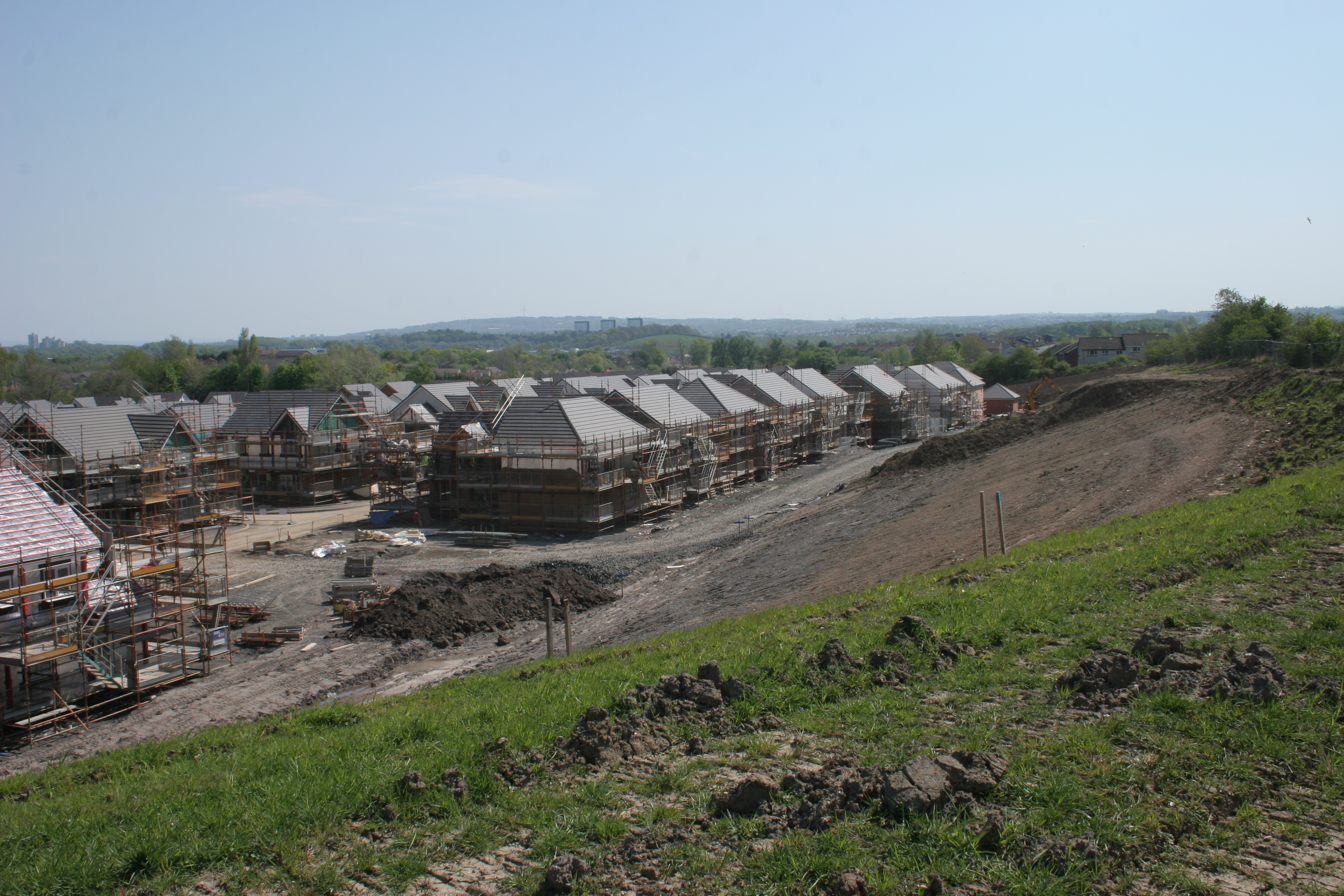
New housing under construction at Raeswood, 2016

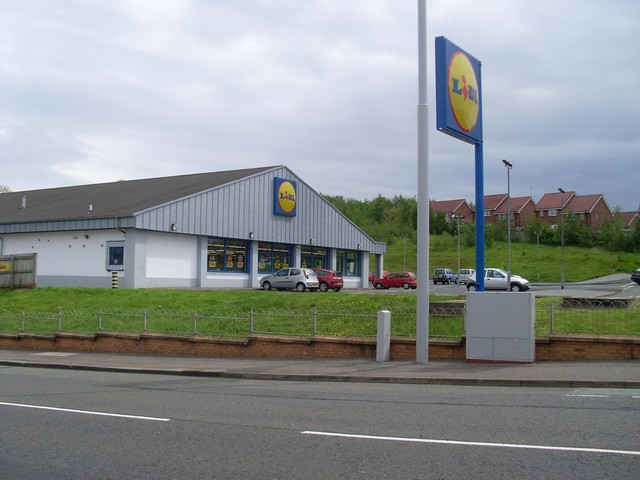
Lidl at Dalmellington Road

Despite the large number of family homes, there are no primary schools in this area itself, the closest being in west Pollok a short distance from each other, and another at a modern campus in Craigbank (Nitshill) – it incorporates the special educational needs base previously at Howford School, the vacated building for which was subjected to arson in 2018. The older local schoolchildren typically attend Rosshall Academy and Lourdes Secondary, although St Paul's High School is physically closer for many.

This southern sector of Crookston has no official recognised centre, the closest equivalent arguably being the crossroads at Bullwood Drive and Dalmellington Road where there is a supermarket and chemist in addition to Crookston Medical Centre (built in 2000) and Crookston Bowling Club, which has its origins in the 1940s as part of the recreational provision for workers at the Rolls-Royce factory in Hillington Industrial Estate. There is a local Crookston Community Group based just east of Crookston Road, but technically this falls under Pollok and is involved with providing support to deprived communities in the south-west of Glasgow, a socio-economic classification into which most of Pollok falls, but Crookston does not – some very large and grand homes have been built, particularly around Leverndale. There is also a natural barrier between the areas for the most part, formed by Haugh Hill and other elevated woodland (labelled as components of the 'Stirling Maxwell Forest Parks', a designation for the many green areas in and around the streets of Pollok, including old Crookston Wood). Echoing the area's past, a new elderly care facility, Meadowburn Home, opened in 2019 close to where Crookston Home had stood but on the Pollok side of these woods; another smaller home at Bonnyholm near Rosshall (replacing a primary school, in a part of north Pollok where most of the residences were rebuilt too) had opened in 2018.

Most amenities are located in the centre of Pollok, including the modernised 'civic realm' with district library, health centre and sports centre, adjacent to the Silverburn Centre with various retail and dining options and a cinema. The local community council covering this area is Hurlet and Brockburn CC.

=== Name ===
While the individual modern developments in this area have used various names in marketing and for their streets (Raeswood, Blacksey Burn, Langhaul, Castlewood, Leverndale, Bullwood, Parklands etc.), none have been adopted more widely as the common name for their community, with 'Crookston' used by the media in reports referring to events in all of its smaller parts. No clarifying prefixes (Old/New, north–south) have ever been adopted in official contexts in relation to the distinct areas on either side of the railway and river, although their differing history and geography would justify the usage of such distinctions.

== Transport ==
The First Glasgow number 3 bus service between Glasgow's West End, city centre, Silverburn and Govan runs the length of Crookston Road through both the northern and southern parts of the area. The number 9 service between Paisley and Glasgow runs via Paisley Road West.

Trains from Crookston operate every half hour, or hourly on Sundays. The closest railway station to the southernmost parts is Nitshill, one mile (1.5 kilometres) from the junction of Barrhead Road. That neighbourhood is also about the same distance from Junction 2 of the M77 motorway between Glasgow and Ayrshire, whereas the northern neighbourhood is slightly further from Junction 25 of the M8 motorway between Glasgow Airport and Edinburgh.

== Notable people ==
- Iain Connell, writer and actor
- Mary Lee, singer
- Jack Milroy, comedian
