= Halfway, Glasgow =

Area of Glasgow, Scotland

Coordinates: 55.845247°N 4.333383°W

Halfway: Scottish Gaelic: Taigh Letheach Slighe; Scots: Haufwey
- Location within Glasgow
- OS grid reference: NS540638
- Council area: Glasgow City Council
- Lieutenancy area: Glasgow
- Country: Scotland
- Sovereign state: United Kingdom
- Post town: GLASGOW
- Postcode district: G52
- Dialling code: 0141
- Police: Scotland
- Fire: Scottish
- Ambulance: Scottish
- UK Parliament: Glasgow South West
- Scottish Parliament: Glasgow Pollok

Halfway, also known as Halfwayhouse (Scottish Gaelic: Taigh Letheach Slighe), is a neighbourhood on the south-west side of the city of Glasgow, Scotland. Once a small village in its own right, sitting on the original Renfrewshire-Lanarkshire border, the area takes its name from the fact that it lies equidistant between Glasgow and Paisley at a distance of three miles (five kilometres) from each ("Three Mile House" was situated on Paisley Road West, but has long since gone, although "Two Mile House" built and owned by the various railway companies at the junction of Dumbreck Road survived into the 1980s).

In 1926, Halfwayhouse and a handful of neighbouring villages including Cardonald, Hillington and Crookston were annexed to the ever-expanding city of Glasgow. This resulted in the renaming of many local roads to prevent duplication with ones in Glasgow.

Through the 1940s and 1950s, Halfwayhouse was developed significantly to the point where there is very little trace of the original village on what is still the main road between Glasgow and Paisley.

The area is bordered by two cemeteries: Craigton Cemetery to the north overlooked by the 1950s Moss Heights multi-storey apartments and Cardonald Cemetery to the south, adjoining the Mosspark neighbourhood.
