= Glasgow Pollok =

Glasgow Pollok may mean or refer to:

- Glasgow Pollok (UK Parliament constituency)
- Glasgow Pollok (Scottish Parliament constituency)
