= FST =

FST may refer to:

== Arts and entertainment ==
- Finlands Svenska Television, now Yle Fem, the Swedish-language department of the Finnish Broadcasting Company
- Florida Studio Theatre, in Sarasota, Florida, United States
- Free Southern Theater, in Mississippi, United States

== Biology ==
- Fixation index (F_{ST}), in population genetics
- Follistatin, a mammalian glycoprotein (and gene)
- Forced swim test, in animal behavioral studies

== Education ==
- Franciscan School of Theology, in California, United States
- French School of Thessaloniki, in Greece
- The interdisciplinary field of food science and technology

== Government and politics ==
- Fermanagh and South Tyrone (Assembly constituency), in Northern Ireland
- Fermanagh and South Tyrone (UK Parliament constituency), in Northern Ireland
- Financial Secretary to the Treasury, of the United Kingdom
- Foreign Sports Talent Scheme, of Singapore

== Military ==
- Fire Support Team of the Royal Artillery
- Fleet Survey Team of the United States Navy
- Forward surgical teams of the United States Army

== Technology ==
- Feature Selection Toolbox, machine learning software
- File Streaming Technology, a digital audio format
- Finite-state transducer
- Full-Scale Tunnel, a demolished NASA wind tunnel

== Transport ==
- Fenchurch Street railway station, in London
- First Stop Travel, a Scottish bus operator
- Fort Stockton–Pecos County Airport, in Texas, United States
- Sint-Truiden railway station, in Belgium

== Other uses ==
- Family Survival Trust, in the United Kingdom
- Foundation for Science and Technology, in the United Kingdom
- Field sobriety testing
- Fiji Standard Time
