= Ralston, Renfrewshire =

Coordinates: 55.84628°N 4.37971°W

Ralston: Scottish Gaelic: Baile Raghnaill; Scots: Ralphstoun
- Location within Scotland Ralston (Scotland)
- Population: 4,507 (1991 Census)
- Lieutenancy area: Renfrewshire
- Country: Scotland
- Sovereign state: United Kingdom
- Post town: PAISLEY
- Postcode district: PA1
- Dialling code: 0141
- Police: Scotland
- Fire: Scottish
- Ambulance: Scottish
- UK Parliament: Paisley and Renfrewshire North
- Scottish Parliament: Paisley

Ralston (Baile Raghnaill in Scottish Gaelic) is a small upper class suburban settlement in Renfrewshire, Scotland. The district straddles the A761 (formerly the A737), the main dual-carriageway between Renfrewshire and the City of Glasgow.

== History ==
=== Estates of Ralston ===
The modern settlement of Ralston takes its name from the ancient feudal estates of Ralphistoun (Ralph's town), named after the younger son of the Earl of Fife, to whom the lands were given in the early 12th century. The feudal estates included the lands of Auldtoun (now Oldhall), Hullhead, Barshaw, Whitehaugh, Byres, Honeybog, Pennilee, Maylee and Ralstonwood.

When the use of surnames was adopted in the Scottish Lowlands, the descendants of the Earl's younger son named themselves 'Ralston' after the estates. The lands remained in the Ralston family until 1704 when they were sold by Gavin Ralston to John, Earl of Dundonald, who conferred them on his daughter, Lady Anne Cochrane, when she married James Hamilton, 5th Duke of Hamilton. Their son sold Ralston in 1755 to William MacDowal of Castle Semple, an eminent Glasgow merchant and one of the founders of the Ship Bank there. His son, William of Garthland and Castle Semple, sold Ralston in 1800 to William Orr, son of a Paisley manufacturer who, with his brother, had made his fortune in the manufacture of linens in Ireland. Three years earlier, he had acquired from the Earl of Glasgow, part of the lands of Ingliston, on which he built an elegant manor house. Upon purchase of the estates, he merged all of them into one, which he called Ralston, and his manor house became the Mansion of Ralston. In 1840, James Richardson, a Glasgow merchant, secured the lands. His son, Thomas Richardson, enlarged the mansion and increased the size of the estate.

The Ralston estates were eventually carved up and sold as farmland in the late 19th century. The ruins of Ralston Mansion were demolished in the 1930s, however part of the original stonework forms an annex to the club house at Ralston Golf Club. The East and West Lodges on the Glasgow Road were the original gate houses to the estates.

=== Planned village ===
In the early 19th century, the development of the textile industry in Renfrewshire resulted in the increase in road traffic across the county. The main road running through the Ralston estates was nothing more than a narrow dirt track. The original road ran from Paisley, through the then-village of Williamsburgh and across the tops of the Byres, Barshaw and Honeybog hills. When a programme of long-distance road construction was introduced, a new road was built, snaking through the low-lying ground at the foot of the hills. The original track later fell into disuse and the new route became what is now the Glasgow Road.

Villas began to appear along Glasgow Road in the late 19th century, mostly in what is now the Oldhall district near Barshaw Park. A village-proper was established in the valley between the hills of Bathgo and Honeybog in the early 1930s as post-war residential development increased. Developers planned Ralston as a leafy haven for wealthy Paisley textile merchants, wishing to raise their families in a more rural setting beyond the burgh's boundaries.

Most of the area's original farmhouses were demolished to make way for the fledgling village. These included:

- Oldhall (at the far end Oldhall Road, which was actually originally the path leading up to the farmhouse)
- Rylees (which sat at the bend of Atholl Crescent - its path coincides roughly with School Road, leading down to Penilee Road, which like Glasgow Road, was a well-established track)
- South Hillington (the most recent victim of Ralston's expansion, which lay in ruin until 1973 when it was finally consigned to the history books to make way for Ossian Avenue)
- South Ingliston (which lay in what is now Ralston Golf Course, just beyond the bend of Bathgo Avenue)
- The Furnace (originally number 18 Penilee Road)

== Geography ==
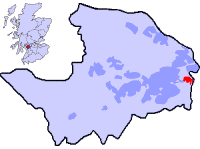
The location of Ralston in Renfrewshire, and Scotland.

Ralston is situated primarily on a series of south-facing hillsides, overlooking the Gleniffer Braes and the Bullwood plantation. The district merges congruously with the sandstone villas of Paisley to its west. Here, Barshaw Park provides a convenient boundary between the district and its larger neighbour. To the east, Ralston's painted stone cottages and their proudly-maintained front gardens define the Glasgow Road all the way to the Renfrewshire border and beyond, merging unobtrusively with the cottages of neighbouring Crookston. Ralston's northern edge is defined by South Arkleston farm at the foot of Penilee Bridge; its southern extent is limited by Ralston Golf Course and the leeward side of Bathgo Hill.

To the north, the district's official (ward) boundary extends beyond Penilee Bridge, to the main Paisley - Glasgow railway (Inverclyde Line), which forms the boundary between North and South Arkleston farms. To the south, Ralston's 'jurisdiction' takes in the whole of Ralston Golf Course and extends beyond the Paisley Canal railway line to the White Cart Water at Ross Hall Mains farm.

Ralston's northern boundary falls close to the out-of-town retail development at Braehead on the River Clyde near Renfrew. To the west, Ralston's boundary with Paisley is less well-defined. Despite Paisley's pre-1974 burgh boundary intersecting the Glasgow Road at the corner of Oldhall Road, today, the district is considered by many, including the local community council, to include the part of Paisley between Hawkhead Road and the historic Paisley-Ralston boundary. This is primarily attributable to the fact that, in spite of the formal administrative boundaries, both current and traditional, children living east of Hawkhead Road have always fallen within the catchment area of Ralston Primary School.

== Administration ==
Despite its close proximity to Paisley, Ralston has always remained independent of its larger neighbour, and until 1974, formed the most part of Hurlet and Oldhall in the 2nd Landward District of the County of Renfrew.

In a local referendum, held in 1995 ahead of the planned abolition of the Strathclyde Region and the partition of Renfrewshire into three separate local government areas, the residents of Ralston voted overwhelmingly against leaving the new Paisley-based (and Labour-dominated) Renfrewshire authority to become an annex of the newly partitioned (and Conservative-run) East Renfrewshire. Despite East Renfrewshire's assurance that a local government office would be set up within Ralston, locals were concerned that the district would be no more than a remote outpost, linked to the rest of the authority by a narrow strip of countryside with no direct road or public transport links connecting the two. By far the most persuasive reason against annexation, however, was that Ralston School was (and is) one of the five feeder primaries, serving Paisley's Grammar School. Parents were concerned that if the district were to leave the jurisdiction of Renfrewshire's education authority, local children would be prevented from attending Ralston's closest secondary school.

Ralston is now administered as a local government ward of the Renfrewshire authority (named Paisley Northeast and Ralston). In terms of local democracy, the district is represented by the Ralston Community Council, which lobbies the Renfrewshire authority on matters of local significance. Nationally, the area falls within the Paisley constituency of the Scottish Parliament and is represented in the UK Parliament as part of Paisley and Renfrewshire North.

Today, mainly as a result of postal addressing and local government reorganisation, many newcomers to Ralston are unaware that they do not technically live in Paisley. Nowadays, the only obvious, albeit subtle, reminder of Ralston's separate identity is the fact that on crossing into Renfrewshire on the A761 Glasgow Road, drivers pass a "Welcome to Renfrewshire" sign a whole kilometre before they pass a sign welcoming them to Paisley.

Ralston's current status, however, is that of a middle-class Paisley suburb.

== Transport ==
The main road through Ralston is the A761, which begins in Port Glasgow at the junction with the A8, and runs through Linwood and Paisley before reaching Ralston. It then continues across the Renfrewshire-Glasgow border through Crookston, Cardonald and Ibrox to Paisley Road Toll, where it meets the A8 once again. The road is regularly subject to police speed checks, due to the problem of drivers speeding through Ralston's 30 mph limit. Typically around 1,400 vehicles travel in both directions through the area per hour.

As a middle-class suburb, car ownership is among the highest in Renfrewshire, with many 2-car households. Ralston is also above the Strathclyde regional average in car ownership, which is the lowest in Scotland.

Ralston is bounded by both the Paisley Canal and Ayrshire & Inverclyde railway lines on its southern and northern sides, respectively. Whilst Hillington, Crookston and Hawkhead stations are close for some residents, the majority of the district's population live too far away to receive a convenient train service. The Paisley Canal line partially re-opened in 1990, following its closure in 1983, one of the last railway lines to ever fall victim of the Beeching cuts. Hawkhead station opened later than the rest of the line in 1991.

Primarily on account of its location on the main route between Paisley and Glasgow, Ralston is well-served by local bus services, with some services running 24 hours a day at weekends. It is estimated that the frequency of buses on the main A761 road is every 2–3 minutes during the day, which makes traffic through Ralston very busy indeed. First Glasgow, First Stop Travel and McGill's Bus Services operate bus routes through the area, connecting Ralston with neighbouring towns and facilities, including Paisley, Johnstone, Glasgow Airport and Glasgow.

== Trivia ==
- Scottish actors David Tennant, Tom Conti and Gerard Butler hail from Ralston, as does interior designer John Amabile and poet Graham Fulton.
- Today, Penilee Road runs northward past the Arkleston farms and turns sharply to the right to avoid the M8 motorway as it enters Hillington Estate. At this bend, the road used to veer slightly to the left and continued through to Renfrew, where it became what is now Newmains Road.
- Historically, Ralston's boundaries were defined by the East and West Gates, the former entrances to what was the Ralston Estate, which still contains period houses at these locations. Bus fares, however, have remained true to history and buses only enter the Ralston 'fare stage' at Bathgo Avenue - at the site of the period house at Ralston East Gate. The Ralston stage runs from here to the corresponding West Gate at Strathmore Avenue. This leaves the section from the Renfrewshire boundary at Killearn Drive to Bathgo Avenue erroneously in the Crookston stage. Similarly, a mismatch between the Strathclyde ZoneCard and local authority boundaries has resulted in the portion of Ralston east of Penilee Road in the Greater Glasgow 'G3' zone, with the rest of the district in the more appropriate Renfrewshire 'R1' zone. This anomaly does, however, result in residents in eastern Ralston, who commute to Glasgow for work, enjoying cheaper public transport costs, as they require one less zone than the rest of eastern Renfrewshire.
- Until the 1950s, Buchlyvie Road only existed on the Auchmannoch side of the Southwold hill crest, turning sharply right into Southwold Road rather than continuing down-hill toward Ralston School. Similarly, Auchmannoch Avenue ran from its cul-de-sac near Dalfoil Court to Buchlyvie Road where it formed a T-junction - the stretch between Buchlyvie Road and Penilee Road was a later addition, as characterised by the modern brick construction of the houses in contrast to the traditional sandstone that is common in Ralston.
- Up until 1966, what is now the M8 motorway between Hillington and Arkleston was built adjacent to the runway of Renfrew Airport, which closed in that year, following the opening of the new Glasgow (Abbotsinch) Airport slightly further west. Hillington Estate was actually the airport engineering works, hence it being (until recently) the location of the Rolls-Royce Plc aero engine plant.
- St Mirren F.C. along with Renfrewshire Council turned the Ralston Community Centre fields into a football training facility and academy.
