= James Stewart of Cardonald =

Scottish landowner

James Stewart of Cardonald (1512–1584) was a Scottish landowner and soldier.

== Career ==
His lands were at Cardonald, near Glasgow, and his principal home, the Place of Cardonald or Cardonald Castle on the banks of the River Cart has been demolished. There was formerly a stone at the site carved with the initials "J.S. 1565" and a helmet.

During the war between Scotland and England now known as the Rough Wooing, James Stewart wrote letters to Mary of Guise and to English commanders including Thomas Wharton. He was a kinsman and supporter of the Earl of Lennox.

In October 1543 seven ships arrived at Dumbarton Castle and James Stewart of Cardonald was appointed to escort Jacques de la Brosse and the lawyer, Jacques Ménage, seigneur de Caigny. Stewart wrote to Cardinal Beaton that these envoys were, "na grett personages" who had brought, "sellvar and artellyery monesyzonis pekes and halberdes."

During the war of the Rough Wooing he sent news to England, describing the building in April 1547 of new spur fortifications at Edinburgh Castle and Stirling Castle.

He was captain of the guard for Mary, Queen of Scots in 1561. He was keeper of James Hamilton, 3rd Earl of Arran at Edinburgh Castle in 1562. On 18 January 1565 he was attacked and injured on the High Street of Edinburgh by three members of the Hume family.

John Stewart of Cardonald signed the band made at Hamilton on 8 May 1568 in support of Mary after her escape from Lochleven.

He died in 1584.

== Family connections ==
His sister Margaret Stewart married John Stewart of Minto, and their children included Walter Stewart, 1st Lord Blantyre.

His brother Matthew Stewart married Jehane or Jean Montgomerie, a daughter of Hugh Montgomerie, 2nd Earl of Eglinton and Marion or Mariota Seton, a sister of George Seton, 6th Lord Seton.

His brother Alan Stewart was Commendator or Abbot of Crossraguel. Richard Bannatyne wrote that Allan Stewart was a friend to Cardonald.
