= Rosshall Academy =

Location
- 131 Crookston Road; Crookston, Glasgow, G52 3PD; Scotland
- 55.842145°N 4.363187°W

Information
- Established: 2001
- Head Teacher: Pauline Swan
- Gender: Co-educational
- Age: 11 to 18
- Enrolment: 1241
- Capacity: 1250
- Houses: Lewis, Harris, Barra, Skye, Iona
Colour
- Feeder primaries: Cardonald, Craigton, Crookston Castle, Hillington & Sandwood, along with Mosspark (part of).
- Website: http://www.rosshallacademy.glasgow.sch.uk/

Rosshall Academy is a secondary school in the Rosshall (Crookston) area of Glasgow, Scotland. The school was formed in August 1999 to merge Penilee Secondary School (Penilee) and Crookston Castle Secondary School (Pollok) and moved to a new building roughly equidistant between them on Crookston Road in 2002. It holds over 1,100 pupils.

Rosshall Academy has five main feeder primary schools – Cardonald Primary, Craigton Primary, Crookston Castle Primary, Hillington Primary and Sandwood Primary, along with a part association with Mosspark Primary (Mosspark's catchment being split between Rosshall and Bellahouston Academy).

== Building ==
Less than a year after opening, the Rosshall school was at the centre of an investigation into so-called "sick building syndrome". Staff blamed their suffering health on classrooms being too small and ventilation so poor that they had to leave fire doors wedged open. Teachers suffered myriad illnesses including headaches, throat problems and eye conditions such as conjunctivitis. Doctors and opticians consulted by staff blamed the illnesses on the environmental conditions at the school, particularly the fact that the classrooms were far smaller than those in the schools it had replaced. Professor Derek Clements-Croome of Reading University, an expert in sick building syndrome, said that Rosshall appeared to conform to the general profile of "unhealthy" buildings: "Hot air rises, so generally in normal classrooms, the heat and any pollutants in the air will rise above the head of a class. Lowering the ceiling height means anyone standing up will find their nose and mouth at exactly the level where this fog of carbon dioxide can be found."

== Death ==
Euan Craig, a 14-year-old pupil, died after being punched five times in the head by a fellow pupil in the academy's gymnasium on 23 May 2012. The other boy, also 14, who had been accidentally hit by a sponge ball Euan had thrown to friends, admitted walking over and punching Euan. The youth was sentenced on 23 November 2012 by Lord Bracadale at the High Court in Edinburgh to three and a half years in custody for the violent assault. Darren Taylor, the youth who killed Euan Craig, was released after 20 months in detention on 22 August 2014.
