= John Amabile (interior designer) =

Scottish interior designer

John Amabile (pronounced Am-ah-bih-lay) is a Scottish interior designer, media content writer, TV presenter and event host, who has worked on TV makeover shows.

== Life and career ==
Born in 1964, Amabile grew up in the Ralston district of Paisley, Renfrewshire.

In the 1980s he got a degree in interior design from Glasgow College of Building and Printing.

He then moved to London, worked in set design for television and progressed onto appearing in many ITV design shows, as occasional chat show guest. He appeared on the ITV show Better Homes with Carol Vorderman several times and offered design advice on the morning show, GMTV. He then moved on to the ITV afternoon show, 60 Minute Makeover.

In 2002 The Scotsman voted him the tenth most eligible bachelor in Scotland.

In June 2011, Amabile appeared on STV's tea-time lifestyle show The Hour as their interior design expert.

Amabile is a Charity Ambassador for Spina Bifida Scotland.

== Personal life ==
In September 2018, Amabile spent five days in the hospital and almost lost his hand due to a mosquito bite.

In July 2021, Amabile got into a drink-driving accident and was banned from driving for four years.

Amabile married Steven Gormley, his partner of twenty years, in December 2022.
