= Cardonald Parish Church =

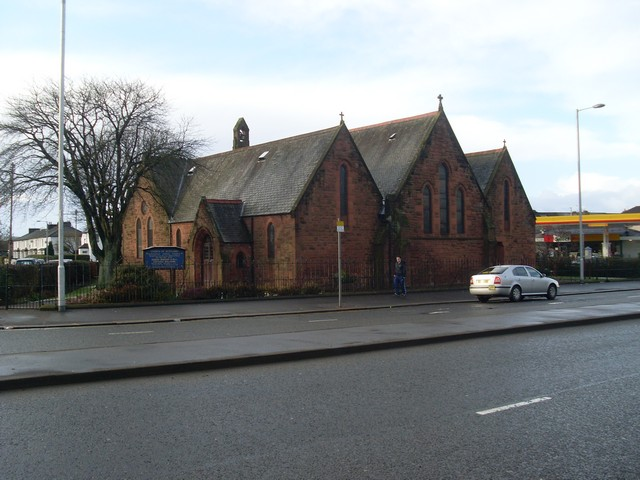
- Cardonald Parish Church
- 55°50′44″N 4°21′21″W
- Location: Glasgow
- Country: Scotland
- Denomination: Church of Scotland
- Website: Church Website

History
- Status: Active
- Founded: 26 January 1887
- Dedicated: 17 February 1889

Architecture
- Functional status: Parish church
- Architect: Peter Macgregor Chalmers
- Architectural type: Church
- Style: English Gothic
- Years built: 1887–1889

Administration
- Parish: Cardonald

Listed Building – Category B
- Designated: 17 February 1992
- Reference no.: LB33603

Cardonald Parish Church is a 19th-century Parish church of the Church of Scotland, located in the Cardonald area of Glasgow.

== History of the Congregation ==
The congregation was established on 26 January 1887, with a meeting held in a school room in Cardonald. In 1889 a Minister was appointed to minister to the congregation, while on 14 July 1890, the parish of Cardonald was created, after it was disjoined from the parish of Paisley and Govan. Initially the parish was part of the Presbytery of Paisley, however, in 1929, Cardonald Parish Church was transferred to the Presbytery of Glasgow.

== History of the Church Building ==
The church was built in the early English Gothic style, designed by Peter Macgregor Chalmers. It was built between 1887 and 1889, using Ballochmyle red sandstone. The church was dedicated on dedicated on 17 February 1889. The west gable was added in 1899, while the east gable, including the extension of the chancel, was built in 1925. The church halls were built in 1940.

== Interior of the Church ==
The chancel includes an alabaster and stone pulpit, the work of Jackson Brown & Co. there is also an oak communion table, reading desk and elders’ benches. The north wall screen was designed by Ross & Manson. A number of stained glass windows can also be found, notably the three-light chancel window by J & W Guthrie, a series of six windows by Sadie McLellan, and a Millennium window by Roland Mitton.
