= Hillington East railway station =

Railway station in Glasgow, Scotland

Hillington East Scottish Gaelic: Hillington an Ear
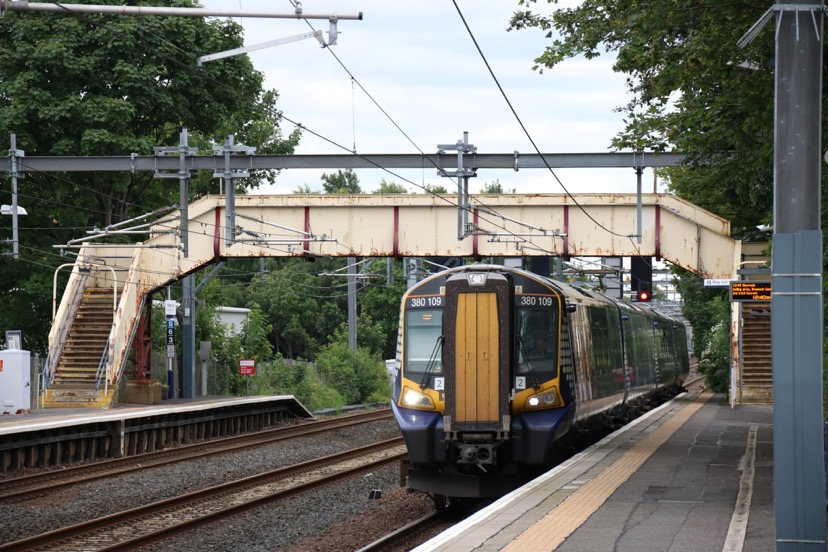
- Hillington East station in 2020.

General information
- Location: Hillington, Glasgow; Scotland
- Coordinates: 55.8542°N 4.3551°W
- Grid reference: NS526648
- Managed by: ScotRail
- Transit authority: SPT
- Platforms: 2
- Tracks: 3

Other information
- Station code: HLE

Key dates
- 19 March 1934: Opened as Hillington
- 1 April 1940: Renamed Hillington East

Passengers
- 2020/21: ▼68,926
- 2021/22: ▲0.143 million
- 2022/23: ▲0.176 million
- 2023/24: ▲0.209 million
- 2024/25: ▲0.230 million
Location
Notes
- Passenger statistics from the Office of Rail and Road

Hillington East railway station is located in the Hillington district of Glasgow, Scotland, also serving the eastern portion of the large Hillington industrial estate (which is part of the town of Renfrew) to the north. The station is managed by ScotRail and is on the Inverclyde Line.

== History ==
The station opened on 19 March 1934 as Hillington. The station was renamed Hillington East on 1 April 1940.

== Services ==
The basic off peak frequency from here (Monday to Sataturday) is half-hourly, eastbound to Glasgow Central and westbound to Greenock Central and Gourock. A few Wemyss Bay trains call in the peaks and also in the evenings (once per hour each way after 18:30, as the Gourock service drops to hourly). On Sundays both Gourock and Wemyss Bay trains call here, giving a half-hourly frequency to/from Glasgow.

== Footnotes ==
Preceding station	National Rail	Following station
Hillington West	ScotRail; Wemyss Bay or Gourock - Glasgow Central	Cardonald
