= Chris Stephens =

Scottish politician (born 1973)

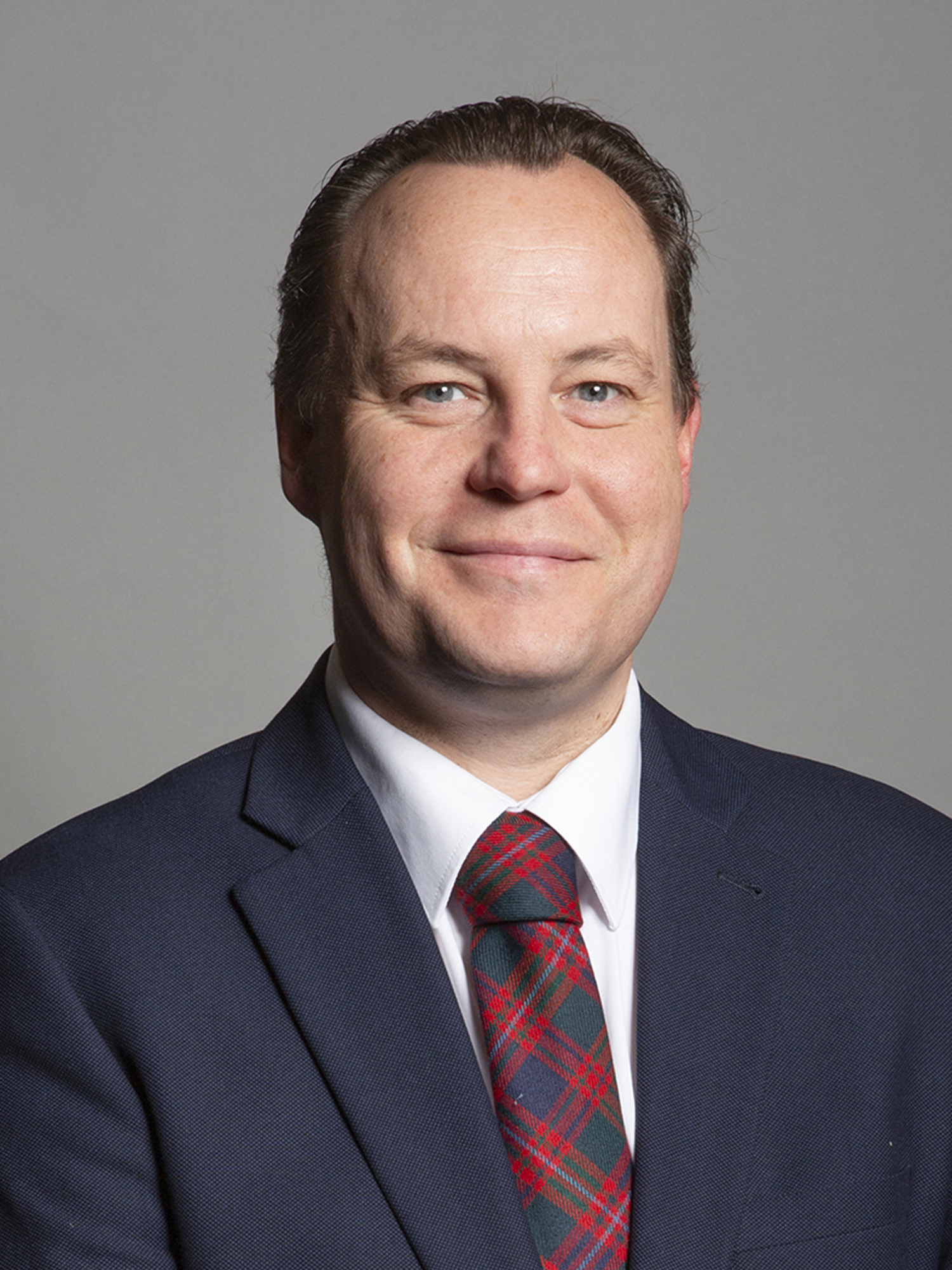
- Official portrait, 2019

SNP Justice and Immigration Spokesperson in the House of Commons
- In office September 2023 – July 2024
- Leader: Stephen Flynn
- Preceded by: Stuart McDonald
- Succeeded by: Position Abolished

SNP Spokesperson for Levelling Up in the House of Commons
- In office 10 December 2022 – 4 September 2023
- Leader: Stephen Flynn
- Preceded by: Patricia Gibson
- Succeeded by: Anum Qaisar

Member of Parliament for Glasgow South West
- In office 7 May 2015 – 30 May 2024
- Preceded by: Ian Davidson
- Succeeded by: Zubir Ahmed

Personal details
- Born: Christopher Charles Stephens; 20 March 1973 (age 53) Glasgow, Scotland
- Party: Scottish National Party
- Spouse: Aileen Colleran
- Website: www.chrisstephens.scot

Christopher Charles Stephens (born 20 March 1973) is a Scottish National Party politician who was the Member of Parliament (MP) for Glasgow South West from 2015 until 2024. He was SNP Spokesperson for Justice and Immigration between September 2023 to July 2024.

== Early life and career ==
Christopher Stephens was born on 20 March 1973 in Glasgow and was educated at Trinity High School, Renfrew and James Watt College in Greenock, where he studied public administration. He joined the SNP at the age of sixteen.

He completed an apprenticeship at Strathclyde Regional Council before working at the council. Stephens then worked for the Glasgow City Council. During this time, he joined the trade union UNISON. Initially Stephens was their youth officer in Glasgow and was later promoted in that branch to treasurer and then vice-chair.

== Political career ==
At the 2007 Scottish Parliament election, Stephens stood as the SNP candidate in Glasgow Pollok, coming second with 31.2% of the vote behind the incumbent Labour and Co-op MSP Johann Lamont. Stephens again stood in Glasgow Pollok at the 2011 Scottish Parliament election, coming second with 44.7% of the vote behind Johann Lamont.

Stephens was 6th on the list of SNP candidates for the six Scottish seats in the 2014 European Parliament election, although as only the first two SNP candidates were elected, Stephens was not elected.

Stephens was the secretary of the SNP Trade Union Group, a member of the party's National Executive Committee.

== Parliamentary career ==
At the 2001 general election, Stephens stood as the SNP candidate in Hamilton North and Bellshill, coming second with 17.2% of the vote behind the incumbent Labour MP John Reid.

Stephens was elected to Parliament at the 2015 general election as MP for Glasgow South West with 57.2% of the vote and a majority of 9,950.

In October 2016, Stephens was reported to have signed the highest number of Early Day Motions of any Member of Parliament.

At the snap 2017 general election, Stephens was re-elected as MP for Glasgow South West with a decreased vote share of 40.7% and a decreased majority of 60.

Stephens is a vice-chair of the All-Party Parliamentary Group on South Africa and Chair of the Public and Commercial Services Union Parliamentary Group.

In March 2018, it was reported that he attempted to make two members of staff in his constituency office redundant, subsequently suspending them from employment, generating criticism from members of his own party.

Stephens was again re-elected at the 2019 general election, with an increased vote share of 47.9% and an increased majority of 4,900.

In November 2023, Stephens was re-elected as the SNP candidate for Glasgow South West at the 2024 general election.

== Personal life ==
Stephens is married to Aileen Colleran, a former Labour councillor elected to Glasgow City Council until 2017. He employed his wife as a part-time parliamentary assistant from August 2017 to 30 April 2018.

Parliament of the United Kingdom
Preceded by Ian Davidson	Member of Parliament for Glasgow South West; 2015–2024	Succeeded by Zubir Ahmed
