= Spruell =

Spruell is a surname. Notable people with the surname include:

- Freddie Spruell (1893–1956), American Delta blues guitarist and singer
- John Spreull also known as John Spreul and Bass John - Glasgow apothecary and businessman
- Sam Spruell, British actor
- Walter Spreull of Cowden Hall, East Renfrewshire
