= Hillington West railway station =

Railway station in Glasgow, Scotland

Hillington West Scottish Gaelic: Hillington an Iar
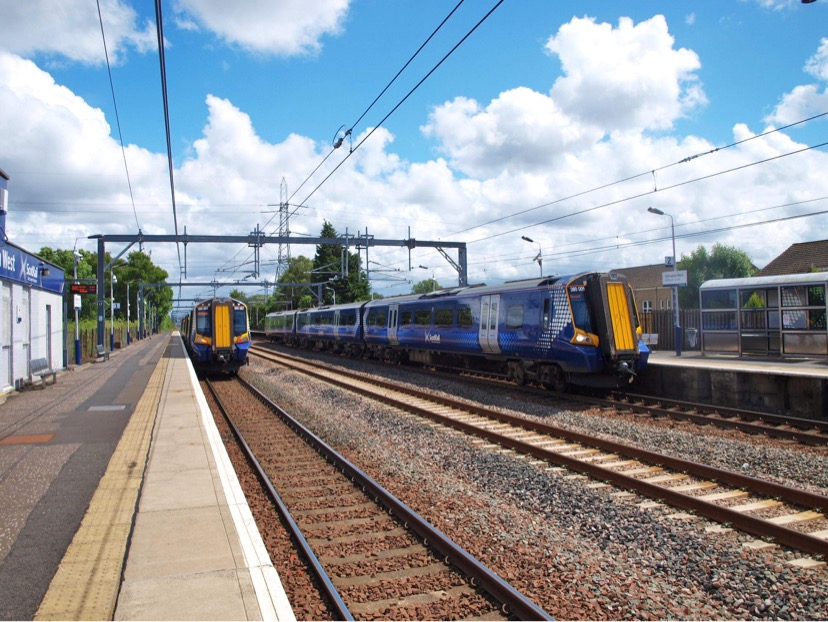

General information
- Location: Hillington, Glasgow; Scotland
- Coordinates: 55.8559°N 4.3708°W
- Grid reference: NS516650
- Manager: ScotRail
- Transit authority: SPT
- Platforms: 2
- Tracks: 3

Other information
- Station code: HLW

Key dates
- 1 April 1940: Opened as Hillington
- 3 March 1952: Renamed Hillington West

Passengers
- 2021/22: ▲0.207 million
- 2022/23: ▲0.242 million
- 2023/24: ▲0.278 million
- 2024/25: ▼0.274 million
- 2025/26: ▼0.226 million
Location
Notes
- Passenger statistics from the Office of Rail and Road

Hillington West railway station is located in the Hillington district of Glasgow, Scotland, also serving the western portion of the large Hillington industrial estate (which is part of the town of Renfrew) to the north, and the Penilee neighbourhood (within Glasgow) to the south. The station is managed by ScotRail and is on the Inverclyde Line.

== History ==
The station opened on 1 April 1940 as Hillington. The station was renamed Hillington West on 3 March 1952.

== Services ==
The basic off peak frequency from here (Mon-Sat) is half-hourly, eastbound to Glasgow Central & westbound to Greenock Central and Gourock. A few Wemyss Bay trains call in the peaks and also in the evenings (once per hour each way after 18:30 to maintain the overall frequency, as the Gourock service drops to hourly). On Sundays the Gourock - Glasgow trains call hourly. The station is served by a staffed ticket office, 07:14 to 14:14 Monday to Saturday.

== Footnotes ==
| Preceding station | National Rail | Following station |
|---|---|---|
| Paisley Gilmour Street | ScotRail; Wemyss Bay or Gourock - Glasgow Central | Hillington East |
