= Zubir Ahmed =

British politician and doctor

Zubir Ahmed MP
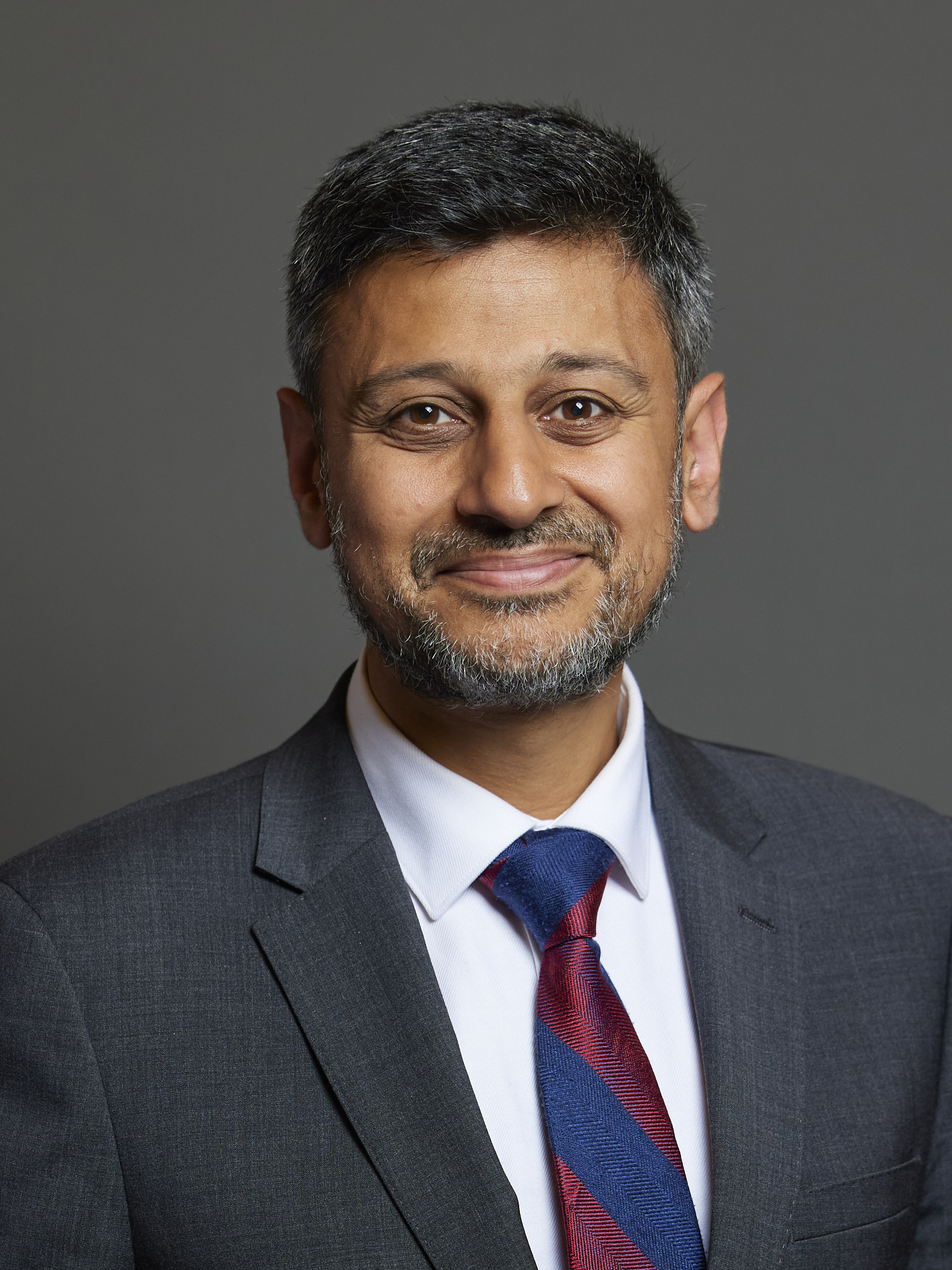
- Official portrait, 2024

Parliamentary Under-Secretary of State for Health Innovation and Safety
- In office 6 September 2025 – 12 May 2026
- Prime Minister: Keir Starmer
- Preceded by: Office established
- Succeeded by: Preet Kaur Gill

Member of Parliament for Glasgow South West
- Incumbent
- Assumed office 4 July 2024
- Preceded by: Chris Stephens
- Majority: 3,285 (9.2%)

Personal details
- Born: July 1981 (age 45) Glasgow, Scotland
- Party: Labour
- Education: University of Glasgow (MB ChB); University College London (MSc); King's College London (PhD); University of Strathclyde (MBA)
- Website: Official website

Zubir Ahmed (born 1980 or 1981) is a Scottish Labour politician and surgeon serving as Member of Parliament (MP) for Glasgow South West since 2024. He served as Parliamentary Under-Secretary of State for Health Innovation and Safety from 2025 to 2026.

== Early life and medical career ==
Ahmed was born to Pakistani parents who emigrated to Scotland in the 1960s, and was the eldest of five children. His father was a taxi driver and he grew up in Govanhill, Glasgow.

Ahmed was educated at Hutchesons' Grammar School, initially fee-paying and latterly on scholarship, where he was a contemporary of Anas Sarwar and Humza Yousaf.

Ahmed received a Bachelor of Medicine, Bachelor of Surgery degree from the University of Glasgow in 2005, where he studied alongside Sarwar once again. He was awarded a Master of Science degree in healthcare from University College London in 2012, a research fellowship in transplantation at King's College London in 2019, and a Master of Business Administration degree from the University of Strathclyde in 2020.

Ahmed was a transplant and vascular surgeon in Glasgow and volunteered in Pakistan. He has been a fellow of the European Board of Surgery and the Royal College of Physicians and Surgeons of Glasgow. Following his election to Parliament, he continued to practise to maintain his medical licence.

== Political career ==
Ahmed joined the Labour Party as a teenager, and decided to stand for office during the COVID-19 pandemic. He was the Labour candidate for Glasgow Pollok in the 2021 Scottish Parliament election, coming second to the Scottish National Party's (SNP) Humza Yousaf.

Ahmed was elected as Member of Parliament for Glasgow South West at the 2024 general election, defeating SNP incumbent Chris Stephens. He was appointed as a Parliamentary Private Secretary to the Health Secretary, Wes Streeting, several weeks after his election.

Ahmed received a £10,000 donation from the think tank Labour Together.

On 12 May 2026, he resigned as junior health minister, citing the Labour Party's poor performance in the 2026 Scottish Parliament election and calling for Keir Starmer to resign.

== Personal life ==
Ahmed met his wife at university. They have two sons and live in Glasgow South West.

Parliament of the United Kingdom
Preceded by Chris Stephens	Member of Parliament for Glasgow South West; 2024–present	Incumbent
