= Glasgow South West =

UK Parliament constituency (since 2005)

Coordinates: 55°50′01″N 4°20′19″W

- Burgh constituency for the House of Commons
- Location of Glasgow South West within Scotland
- Subdivision: Glasgow City
- Electorate: 70,431 (March 2020)
- Major settlements: Cardonald, Darnley, Govan, Mosspark, Nitshill, Pollok, Priesthill

Current constituency
- Created: 2005
- Member of Parliament: Zubir Ahmed (Labour)
- Created from: Glasgow Pollok; Glasgow Govan

Overlaps
- Scottish Parliament: Glasgow Pollok, Glasgow Southside, Glasgow

Glasgow South West is a constituency of the House of Commons of the Parliament of the United Kingdom. As in all other seats since the 1950 abolition of multi-member university returns to the Commons, residents elect one Member of Parliament (MP) by the first past the post system of election. The current Member of Parliament (MP) is Zubir Ahmed of the Labour Party.

== Boundaries ==
Map of boundaries 2005–2024

Map of boundaries from 2024

=== 2005–2024 ===
Before the 2005 general election the city was covered by ten constituencies, of which two straddled boundaries with other council areas. The area's representatives before its inception were those for Glasgow Pollok and to a lesser extent Glasgow Govan.

Under the Fifth Review of UK Parliament constituencies which came into effect for the 2005 general election, the boundaries were defined in accordance with the ward structure in place on 30 November 2004 as containing the Glasgow City Council wards of Cardonald, Crookston, Darnley, Drumoyne, Govan, Ibrox, Mosspark, Nitshill, North Cardonald, Penilee, and Pollok. Further to reviews of local government ward boundaries which came into effect in 2007 and 2017, but did not affect the parliamentary boundaries, the constituency comprised the City of Glasgow Council wards or part wards of: Newlands/Auldburn (small part), Greater Pollok, Cardonald, Govan (majority) and Pollokshields (small part).

=== 2024–present ===
Further to the 2023 review of Westminster constituencies which came into effect for the 2024 general election, there were moderate changes to the constituency boundaries involving the addition of parts of the abolished constituency of Glasgow Central, including the districts of Kingston, Tradeston, Kinning Park and Dumbreck; Pollokshields was transferred from Glasgow South. As part compensation, the districts of North Cardonald, Hillington, Penilee and Rosshall were transferred to Paisley and Renfrewshire North.

The constituency currently consists of the following wards or part wards of the City of Glasgow:

- A small part of Newlands/Auldburn (Arden housing estate);
- the whole of Greater Pollok ward;
- southern parts of Cardonald ward – largely to the south of the A761 (Paisley Road West) and east of the A736 (Crookston Road);
- the whole of Govan ward; and
- the majority of Pollokshields ward, comprising the area to the north of the railway line between Pollokshaws West, Crossmyloof and Rutherglen stations.

The seat is one of six covering the Glasgow City council area; none have overspill. Scottish Parliament constituencies retain the names and boundaries of the immediate forebear seats.

== History ==
The seat saw its first MP at the 2005 general election. Its 2017 general election result was the ninth-closest result, with a winning margin of 60 votes.

At the 2019 general election, Chris Stephens of the SNP was re-elected with an increased majority over Matt Kerr of Labour Co-op, with 4,900 votes and a 7.2% swing from the previous election two years earlier. However, in 2024, he lost his seat to Zubir Ahmed of the Labour Party by 3,285 votes and a 9.2% swing to Labour.

== Members of Parliament ==
Elections	Member	Party
2005; 2010	Ian Davidson	Labour Co-op
2015; 2017; 2019	Chris Stephens	SNP
2024	Zubir Ahmed	Labour

== Election results ==
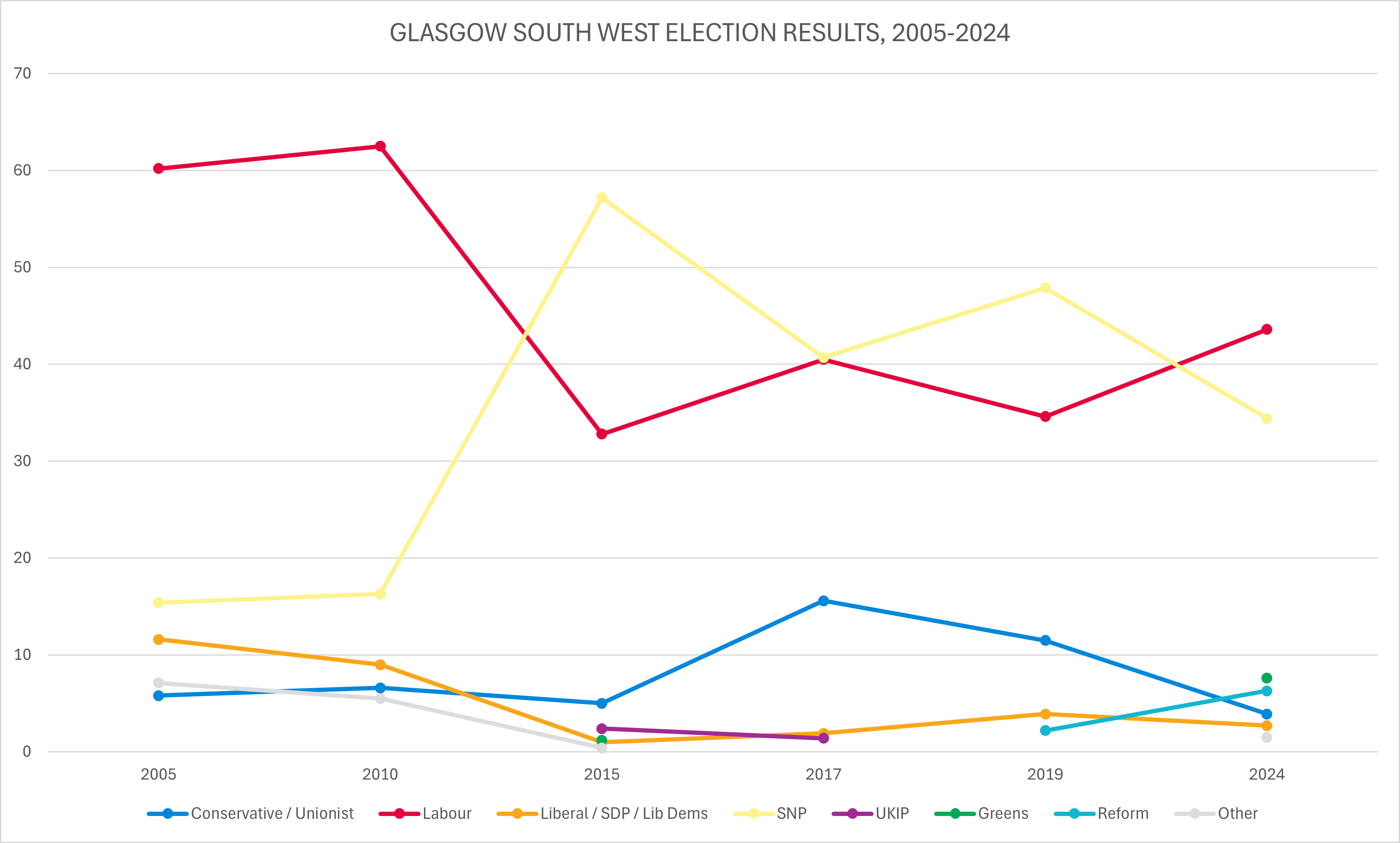
Election results 2005-2024

=== Elections in the 2000s ===
General election 2005: Glasgow South West
Party	Candidate	Votes	%	±%
Labour Co-op	Ian Davidson	18,653	60.2	−1.7
SNP	James Dornan	4,757	15.4	−2.1
Liberal Democrats	Katy Gordon	3,593	11.6	+6.1
Conservative	Scott Brady	1,786	5.8	+0.4
Scottish Socialist	Keith Baldassara	1,666	5.4	−4.1
Independent Green Voice	Alistair McConnachie	379	1.2	New
Socialist Labour	Violet Shaw	143	0.5	New
Majority		13,896	44.8	−0.4
Turnout		30,977	50.0	+0.2
Labour Co-op win (new seat)				

=== Elections in the 2010s ===
General election 2010: Glasgow South West
Party	Candidate	Votes	%	±%
Labour Co-op	Ian Davidson	19,863	62.5	+2.3
SNP	Chris Stephens	5,192	16.3	+0.9
Liberal Democrats	Isabel Nelson	2,870	9.0	−2.6
Conservative	Maya Forrest	2,084	6.6	+0.8
Solidarity (TUSC)	Tommy Sheridan	931	2.9	New
BNP	David Orr	841	2.6	New
Majority		14,671	46.2	+1.4
Turnout		31,781	54.6	+4.6
Labour Co-op hold		Swing	+0.7	

General election 2015: Glasgow South West
Party	Candidate	Votes	%	±%
SNP	Chris Stephens	23,388	57.2	+40.9
Labour Co-op	Ian Davidson	13,438	32.8	−29.7
Conservative	Gordon McCaskill	2,036	5.0	−1.6
UKIP	Sarah Hemy	970	2.4	New
Green	Sean Templeton	507	1.2	New
Liberal Democrats	Isabel Nelson	406	1.0	−8.0
Scottish Socialist	Bill Bonnar	176	0.4	New
Majority		9,950	24.4	N/A
Turnout		40,921	61.8	+7.2
SNP gain from Labour Co-op		Swing	+35.2	

General election 2017: Glasgow South West
Party	Candidate	Votes	%	±%
SNP	Chris Stephens	14,386	40.7	−16.5
Labour Co-op	Matt Kerr	14,326	40.5	+7.7
Conservative	Thomas Haddow	5,524	15.6	+10.6
Liberal Democrats	Ben Denton-Cardew	661	1.9	+0.9
UKIP	Sarah Hemy	481	1.4	−1.0
Majority		60	0.2	−24.2
Turnout		35,378	56.2	−5.6
SNP hold		Swing	−12.1	

General election 2019: Glasgow South West
Party	Candidate	Votes	%	±%
SNP	Chris Stephens	17,643	47.9	+7.2
Labour Co-op	Matt Kerr	12,743	34.6	−5.9
Conservative	Thomas Haddow	4,224	11.5	−4.1
Liberal Democrats	Ben Denton-Cardew	1,435	3.9	+2.0
Brexit Party	Peter Brown	802	2.2	New
Majority		4,900	13.3	+13.1
Turnout		36,847	57.1	+0.9
SNP hold		Swing	+6.6	

2019 notional result (Note: Estimate of the 2019 general election result as if the revised boundaries recommended under the 2023 boundary review were in place)
Party	Vote	%
SNP	20,094	46.7
Labour	14,561	33.8
Conservative	5,423	12.6
Liberal Democrats	1,892	4.4
Brexit Party	695	1.6
Scottish Greens	358	0.8
Majority	5,533	12.9
Turnout	43,023	61.1
Electorate	70,431	

=== Elections in the 2020s ===
General election 2024: Glasgow South West
Party	Candidate	Votes	%	±%
Labour	Zubir Ahmed	15,552	43.6	+9.8
SNP	Chris Stephens	12,267	34.4	−12.3
Green	John Hamelink	2,727	7.6	+6.8
Reform	Morag McRae	2,236	6.3	+4.7
Conservative	Mamun Rashid	1,387	3.9	−8.7
Liberal Democrats	Paul McGarry	958	2.7	−1.7
Alba	Tony Osy	542	1.5	New
Majority		3,285	9.2	N/A
Turnout		35,669	51.8	−9.3
Registered electors		68,871		
Labour gain from SNP		Swing	+11.1	

== See also ==
- Politics of Glasgow
