= Robert Croc =

Anglo-Norman knight

Sir Robert Croc, posthumously often referred to as Sir Robert de Croc in reference to Crookston Castle), was an Anglo-Norman knight and landowner in Scotland in the High Middle Ages. In 1170 (?) he was given the Levern valley in Scotland by King David I of Scotland.

Crookston, Glasgow takes its name from Robert. Crookston Castle is surrounded by a defensive ring-ditch that dates back to the 12th century when Robert, built a timber and earth castle. Remains of a chapel founded by Robert 1180 have been uncovered.

Robert is known to have assigned the patronage of Neilston to the monks of St Mirren's in 1163, on condition that masses should be regularly said for the benefit of his soul.

== See also ==
- Paisley Abbey
- Scoto-Norman
