= Hillington, Scotland =

Area of Glasgow, Scotland

Coordinates: 55°51′03″N 04°21′41″W

Hillington: Scottish Gaelic: Hileantan; Scots: Hullintoun
- Location within Glasgow
- OS grid reference: NS523647
- Council area: Glasgow City Council
- Lieutenancy area: Glasgow
- Country: Scotland
- Sovereign state: United Kingdom
- Post town: GLASGOW
- Postcode district: G52
- Dialling code: 0141
- Police: Scotland
- Fire: Scottish
- Ambulance: Scottish
- UK Parliament: Glasgow South West
- Scottish Parliament: Glasgow Pollok

Hillington (Scots: Hullintoun, Scottish Gaelic: Hileantan) is an area on the southwestern edge of the Scottish city of Glasgow comprising a residential neighbourhood and a large industrial suburb. While the residential area (close to Penilee to the west and directly adjoining North Cardonald to the east, primarily consisting of cottage flats) is wholly within Glasgow, the greater part of the industrial estate on the other side of the Inverclyde Line railway tracks falls under the jurisdiction of neighbouring Renfrew, although uses a Glasgow postcode.

== History ==
=== World War II shadow factory ===
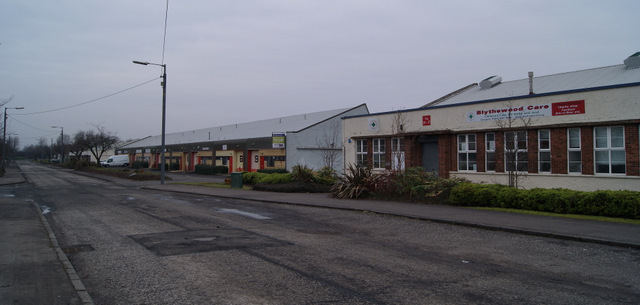
Montrose Avenue, Hillington Industrial Estate

With the developing political situation in Europe in the mid-1930s, the British government set up a plan to treble the output of the British aircraft industry. Under a plan managed by the Air Ministry, the Shadow factory plan was managed by industrialist Herbert Austin, with the aim to create nine new factories, and invest in enabling existing motor vehicle manufacturing plants to expand capacity and make the switch to aircraft production more easy.

Rolls-Royce were key to the plan, and specifically production of their Merlin engine. Having developed a new facility themselves in Crewe, production director Ernest Hives was looking for a northern-based greenfield site with easy transport access, an available skilled workforce, and a local authority willing to build the required associated housing: Rolls had been let down in Crewe, and didn't want to repeat the experience. With its ready-built housing areas, easy access to the Glasgow to Paisley railway line, and in need of commercial activity, Hillington proved an opportunity not to be missed.

The Air Ministry funded the factory construction, with the facility opening in 1937. The industrial estate was opened in 1938 by Queen Elizabeth (later the Queen Mother), and was the first of its kind in Scotland. The first Merlin engines were produced two weeks before the start of World War II. By 1943, output had reached 400 engines each week, with production peaking at 100 engines in one day, and 1,650 a month. By the end of the war, the plant had manufactured 23,500 new engines during the war, 14% of the total Merlin production worldwide.

=== Post war ===
Taken over by Rolls-Royce themselves directly on 1 April 1947, the factory initially repaired and overhauled both Merlin and Griffon engines as well as producing spare parts. Increased requirement for the Avon turbojet for the Korean War meant that it switched totally to fanjet production, and in 1965 became a specialist compressor component manufacturing facility.

The factory closed in December 2005, with all production moved to either the new facility at Inchinnan next to Glasgow Airport, or the redeveloped East Kilbride plant (which itself closed little over a decade later).

In 2015, Glasgow distillery commenced production in Hillington.

== Transport ==
The area is served by two railway stations, Hillington East and Hillington West (at Penilee). Junction 26 of the M8 motorway is located to the north of the industrial estate.

== Business ==
- Instyle Furniture (1983)
