= Penilee =

Coordinates: 55°51′08″N 4°22′12″W

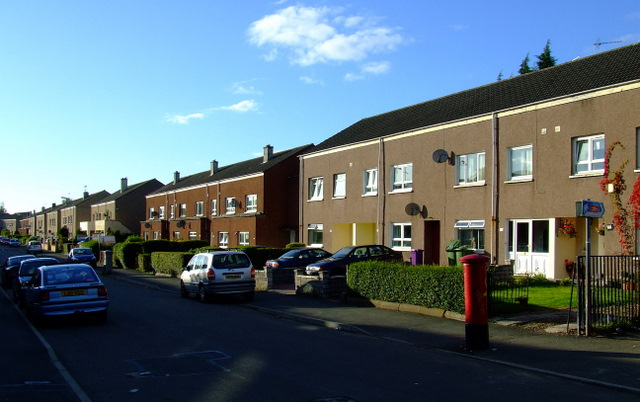
- Linburn Road

- Location within Glasgow
- Council area: Glasgow City Council
- Lieutenancy area: Glasgow
- Country: Scotland
- Sovereign state: United Kingdom
- Post town: GLASGOW
- Postcode district: G52 4
- Dialling code: 0141
- Police: Scotland
- Fire: Scottish
- Ambulance: Scottish
- UK Parliament: Glasgow South West
- Scottish Parliament: Glasgow Pollok

Penilee is a small housing scheme and suburb on the southwestern edge of Glasgow, Scotland. The area is bounded to its east by the Glasgow suburbs of Cardonald and Hillington, and to the west by the Renfrewshire border and the farms of North and South Arkleston. The district's southern boundary forms Glasgow's border with the Renfrewshire settlement of Ralston. The area is currently undergoing considerable residential redevelopment.

== Initial development ==
Penilee was brought into the city of Glasgow with the boundary extension of 1938, and work began on a planned community to house workers at the nearby Hillington Industrial Estate. Some evidence of modernist architecture can be seen in the houses illustrated here, such as the flat roofs, horizontal windows and ship-deck balcony rails.

Although most council house building was suspended for the duration of the Second World War, an exception was made in the case of Penilee because of the demand for homes for workers at the numerous armaments factories at Hillington. Shortage of traditional materials meant that many of the wartime flats at Penilee were built of prefabricated materials such as foamslag.

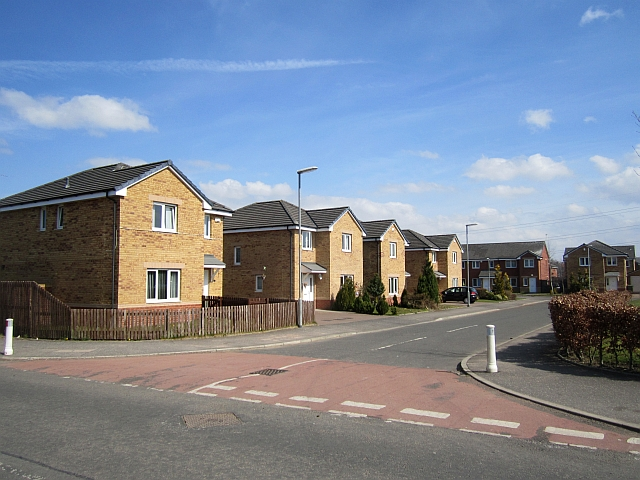
New housing at Craigmuir Place

The war also caused the cancellation of the 1941 census, but it is likely that wartime saw Glasgow's population reach its highest level as workers flooded in to take jobs in the city's numerous essential industries.

The area is served by Hillington West railway station, the lines for which form the northern boundary of the neighbourhood.

== Notable residents ==
Scottish professional footballer Alan Hutton was born in Penilee.

Three members of the music outfit The Orchids grew up and started the band in 1986 in Penilee. The guitarist Zal Cleminson of The Sensational Alex Harvey Band (SAHB) was also born in Penilee.
