= Leverndale Hospital =

- NHS Greater Glasgow and Clyde
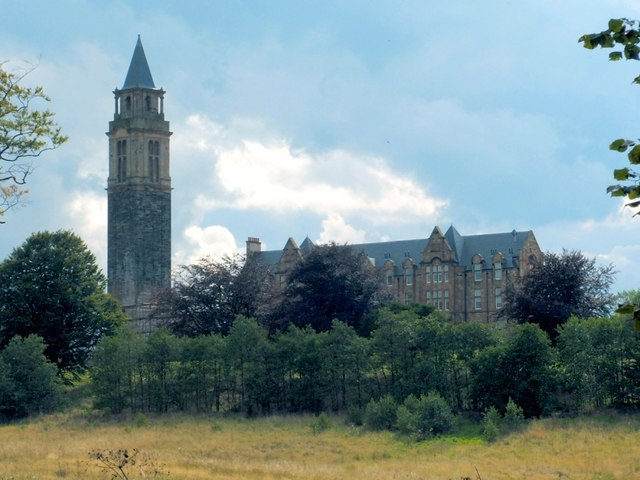
- Leverndale Hospital

- Shown in Glasgow

Geography
- Location: Crookston, Glasgow, Scotland
- Coordinates: 55.8339°N 4.3693°W

Organisation
- Care system: NHS Scotland
- Type: Psychiatric hospital
- Affiliated university: University of Glasgow Medical School

Services
- Emergency department: No

History
- Founded: 1895

Links
- Website: Leverndale Hospital
- Lists: Hospitals in Scotland

Leverndale Hospital is a mental health facility at Crookston, Glasgow, Scotland. It is managed by NHS Greater Glasgow and Clyde. The Towerview Unit, which has been taken out of use, is Category A listed.

== History ==
The hospital, which was designed by Malcolm Stark in the Renaissance Revival style, opened as the Govan District Asylum in September 1895. Two single‑storey pavilions were added in 1908. In 1914, the nearby 17th century Hawkhead House mansion was annexed to become part of the hospital facility, which became known as Hawkhead Asylum (not to be confused with Hawkhead Hospital for infectious diseases a short distance to the west within the boundaries of Paisley, which was constructed in the 1930s).

It joined the National Health Service in 1948 as Hawkhead Mental Hospital; Hawkhead House was demolished in the 1950s. The facility's name was changed to Leverndale Hospital in 1964, and new units for psycho‑geriatric patients were added in the mid-1970s.

After the introduction of Care in the Community in the early 1980s, the hospital went into a period of decline and some of the substantial older buildings, including the Kelburne Unit and Towerview Unit, were taken out of use in the late 20th century and then converted into apartments between 2003 and 2006. Modern medical facilities built on the site to replace the older buildings include a new acute admissions unit completed in summer 2013.
