= First Stop Travel =

Scottish bus company

First Stop Travel was a Scottish bus company, which operated primarily in Renfrewshire and southwest Glasgow. Its depot was located in Muriel Street, Barrhead. It was closed in 2008 after the Traffic Commissioner revoked its licence.

== History ==
Initially founded as the 'Govan Minibus Company' after bus deregulation, it provided strong competition to Strathclyde Buses in the Govan area of Glasgow by operating cheaper minibuses instead of Strathclyde's then full-size buses. Strathclyde countered the threat with minibuses of their own, known as 'Your Wee Happy Bus'. This was the first round of the 'Paisley bus wars' with many competing companies challenging for routes, threatening to bankrupt the larger companies, including Clydeside (now McGill's Bus Company). The bus wars failed to stop the progress of the company, which was competing on a number of key routes with Strathclyde. After FirstGroup purchased Strathclyde's Buses, Govan Minibus Company lost its operating licence when it was revoked by VOSA. The company changed direction away from mini-buses and was re-opened as 'First Stop Travel', usually shorted to F.S.T.

The company still had a large patronage on the former Govan Minibus Company routes and exploited this by running many services in competition with First Glasgow and Arriva. Gibson Direct, another Paisley company, accepted a number of SPT contracts in 2004, and was unable to continue its competition with Arriva on the busy 21 route linking Paisley, Renfrew, Braehead and Govan and thus the buses and route passed to FST. This was FST first route in Renfrew, especially unusual since their depot had been based in the town for some years. This also saw an influx of modern buses and a move to proper albeit small buses rather than minibuses. This service has returned to Gibsons in 2006. First's service cuts in 2005 saw FST become the only operator on the key "Paisley-Penilee-Govan corridor", a route that was well-patronised and run using double deckers with First, as well as the Nitshill-Govan service.

In August 2005, due to reported ill-health of the founder, the Port Glasgow company Slaemuir Coaches acquired the operation. Subsequently following redirection of the business by Slaemuir, the company has been sold on to the Walker Family who run a variety of small bus operations including Gullivers Travel, Erskine Travel and L.B.C. The buses of both Gullivers, First Stop Travel and LBC have now been branded First Stop. As a result, First Stop took over a number of new routes, although these were licensed and operated by vehicles belonging to LBC, Erskine Travel and Gullivers Travel. The buses were painted in an all yellow livery, and the operations moved to premises in Barrhead with the other Walker companies, having left the previous depot in Renfrew.

There was also a significant expansion of services in 2007 with many used vehicles purchased. This saw First Stop compete on many main corridors with local independent operators as well as major companies like Arriva and First. The company operated a service into Glasgow City Centre over the busy 38 corridor with full-size buses. Further into 2007 further expansion took place with the addition of the 9 Paisley - Hawkhead, 19 Paisley - Bridge of Weir and 301 Johnstone - Kilmacolm.

On 14 July 2008 The Traffic Commissioner revoked the company's operating licence, fined owner John Walker £42,000 and banned him from holding an operating licence for 10 years.

== Fleet ==
The fleet varied from Iveco minibuses to full size single deck Dennis Lances, most vehicles were dating from the mid- to late 1990s. The average estimated age of the fleet was 7 to 10 years. After the recent purchase of 10 Dennis Darts the fleet had a big mix of Iveco, Mercedes, Optare and Dennis vehicles. The licence allowed for over 30 vehicles to be run by First Stop Travel with more being licensed for use by associated companies.

When the company was closed down it had around 60 vehicles and employed 87 staff.

== See also ==
- List of bus operators of the United Kingdom
