= Crookston Castle =

Ringwork castle in Glasgow, Scotland, UK

Coordinates: 55°50′06″N 4°21′21″W

- Pollok Glasgow, Scotland
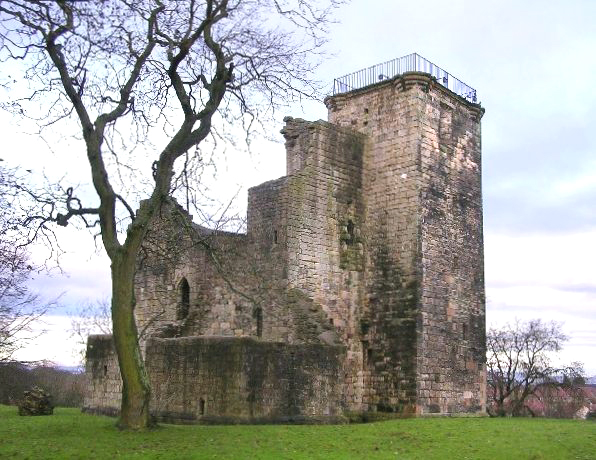
- Crookston Castle in 2005

Site information
- Owner: Scottish Government (Historic Environment Scotland)

Scheduled monument
- Official name: Crookston Castle
- Designated: 27 April 1920
- Reference no.: SM90085

Site history
- Built: 12th century; rebuilt c. 1400

Crookston Castle is a ruined medieval castle in the Pollok area of Glasgow, Scotland. It is located some five miles (eight kilometres) south-west of the city centre, on a hill overlooking the Levern Water, just before its confluence with the White Cart Water. Crookston Castle was built by the Stewarts of Darnley around 1400, and is set within earthworks constructed in the 12th century. Once the property of the earls and dukes of Lennox, the castle was extensively repaired following a siege in 1544, and it is the only surviving medieval castle in Glasgow.

== History ==
Crookston is surrounded by a defensive ring ditch that dates back to the 12th century when Sir Robert de Croc, who also gave his name to the village of Crookston, built a timber and earth castle. Remains of a chapel founded by de Croc in 1180 have been uncovered. Evidence of an even earlier fortification on the same site has also been found. The lands of Crookston were bought by Sir Alan Stewart in 1330, and passed to Sir John Stewart of Darnley, in 1361. The Darnley Stewarts replaced the early castle with the present stone structure around 1400.

In 1489 the Stewart Earl of Lennox rebelled against James IV. James responded by bringing the cannon Mons Meg from Edinburgh and bombarding the castle, virtually destroying its western end and ensuring a quick surrender. On 3 April 1544, the castle was besieged and taken by the Earl of Arran and Cardinal Beaton, while the then Earl of Lennox was defending Glasgow Castle. At this time, Crookston was regarded as the principal house of the earls of Lennox. Regent Arran installed five gunners in the castle in May 1544.

Crookston was included in the dower lands of Margaret Douglas, Countess of Lennox. Her son was the most famous of the Darnley Stewarts, Henry Stuart, Lord Darnley, the second husband of Mary, Queen of Scots. It may have been at Crookston that the couple were betrothed, under a yew tree. The yew was felled in 1816, and a model of Crookston Castle, now on display in Pollok House, was carved from its wood. In 1572, Crookston was granted to another Stewart, Charles, the Earl of Lennox.

In 1703 the Duke of Lennox sold the castle to the Duke of Montrose, and it remained the property of the Dukes of Montrose until 1757, when it was sold by William Graham, 2nd Duke of Montrose to the Maxwells of Pollok. Following several years of abandonment, the castle was partially restored by the Maxwells in 1847, to honour Queen Victoria's visit to Glasgow. In 1931, Crookston became the first property acquired by the National Trust for Scotland, having been presented by Sir John Maxwell Stirling-Maxwell, who was one of the Trust's founder members and first Vice Presidents. During the Second World War the north-eastern tower was used as an aircraft watch tower.

Today, Crookston Castle is a scheduled monument. Its maintenance is the responsibility of Historic Environment Scotland, and the castle is open to the public. It is the second-oldest building in Glasgow, after Glasgow Cathedral.

== Architecture ==
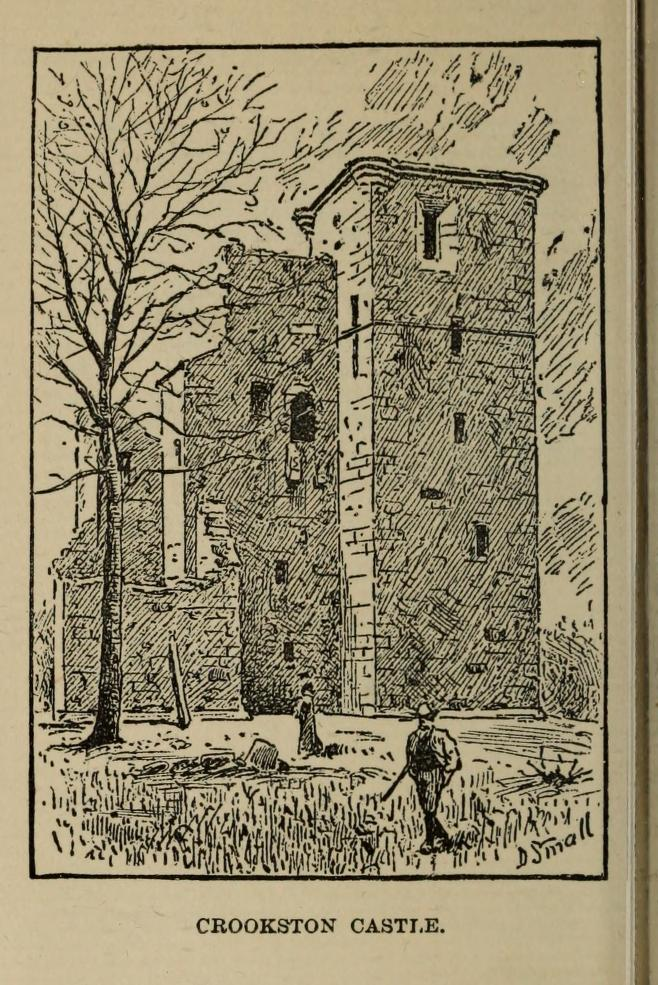
Crookston Castle in 1900

Crookston Castle sits atop a natural hill, emphasised by the early ring ditch, which can still be seen. To the north is a steep drop to the Levern Water. The castle has a rectangular main block, which was strengthened by a tower at each corner. This formed an irregular 'X-plan' shape, an unusual layout also seen at Hermitage Castle. Only the north-east corner tower survives to its former height, as well as the basement of the south-east tower. The two western towers were destroyed in the 15th century and never rebuilt, repairs in the 19th century have obscured even the remains of these. The main body of the castle measures about 19 m by 12 m, with walls up to 3.7 m thick, and the north-east tower is around 6m square.

The entrance is on the north side, adjacent to the north-east tower, and defended by a portcullis and two doors. A straight mural stair leads up to the right, while ahead is a barrel-vaulted basement with slit windows and a well. The hall is at first-floor level, and was also vaulted, rising to 8.3 m high. A turnpike stair in the south-east corner gave access to another storey above the hall, as well as upper rooms in the eastern towers. The towers had one room on each floor. In the basement of the north-east tower is a prison only accessible from above, while at the top there is access to the four storeys of the tower, via modern iron ladders, opening onto an impressive view from the roof. The top of the north-east tower, including corbels, was also rebuilt in the 19th century.

== Verse and fiction ==
The poets Robert Burns, William Motherwell and Robert Tannahill have all mentioned the castle in their works, while Sir Walter Scott, in his 1820 novel The Abbot, suggested Mary, Queen of Scots, watched the Battle of Langside from beneath its yew tree, although the topography makes this impossible.

== See also ==
- Cowden Hall, East Renfrewshire
