= Cardonald Place Farm =

Farmhouse in Glasgow, Scotland

Coordinates: 55.841881°N 4.355924°W

Cardonald Place Farm is a farmhouse on the banks of the White Cart Water river in Cardonald, Glasgow, Scotland. It was built in 1848 on (or close to) the site occupied by the former Cardonald Palace.

Cardonald Castle was the seat of the Cardonald Stewart family in the 16th Century. Nothing remains of Cardonald Palace, although a stone from the palace has been set into the farmhouse above the door.

The farmhouse is featured on the cover of the 1993 book "Old Cardonald Had A Farm" by John A. Innes.

== History ==
The Cardonald Stewarts built a palace at Cardonald around 1565. In 1580, Walter Stewart, Commendator of Blantyre Priory, based himself at Cardonald Palace. Walter Stewart held Angus MacDonald, 8th of Dunnyveg and his wife Mary Maclean as prisoners at Cardonald in September 1597.

The palace is referred to in John Thomson's Atlas of Scotland (1832) as 'Cardonald Ho.').

The palace was demolished in 1846 to be replaced by Cardonald Place Farm in 1848, "Place" being a corruption of palace. A stone from the palace, showing the coat of arms of the Cardonald Stewarts, was set above the entrance to the farm house. The five bedroom farmhouse at 135 Cardonald Place Farm, Cardonald Place Road, Cardonald, G52 3JX, has a large coat of arms above its entrance.

Cardonald (or Crookston) Mill, built in 1748 and with a 30 feet (9.1 m) diameter wheel, was located a short distance to the west of the farm.

In 1926, Glasgow Corporation bought the Cardonald estates, including Cardonald Place Farm. They then built the Moulin Circus estate on the grounds of the farm orchard in the 1940s, which also removed all traces of the old mill.

The steading was used as a Council yard up until around 1992 and had fallen into a state of disrepair. It was sold to a private developer, Hugh Kinnaird, who refurbished the main farmhouse and converted the steading into 3 houses.

Nothing remains of the original farmland or orchard.

== Architecture ==
The farm is built in blonde sandstone with crow stepped gables and is a Category C(S) listed building.

The main building is in a T-shape.
