= Cardonald =

Suburb of Glasgow, Scotland

Coordinates: 55.8494°N 4.3528°W

Cardonald: Scottish Gaelic: Cair Dhòmhnaill; Scots: Cardonal
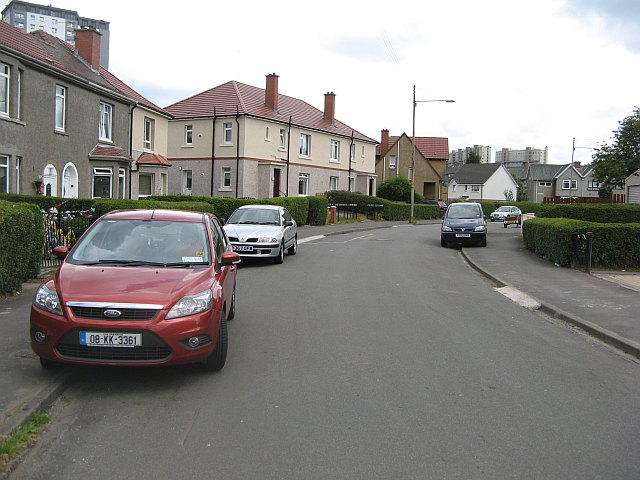
- Ladykirk Drive, North Cardonald (2009)

- Location within Glasgow
- Population: 5,000
- OS grid reference: NS528643
- Council area: Glasgow City Council
- Lieutenancy area: Glasgow
- Country: Scotland
- Sovereign state: United Kingdom
- Post town: GLASGOW
- Postcode district: G52
- Dialling code: 0141
- Police: Scotland
- Fire: Scottish
- Ambulance: Scottish
- UK Parliament: Glasgow South West Paisley and Renfrewshire North
- Scottish Parliament: Glasgow Pollok Renfrewshire North and Cardonald (from May 2026)

Cardonald (/kɑːrˈdɒnəld/; Scots: Cardonal, Scottish Gaelic: Cair Dhòmhnaill) is an outlying suburb of the Scottish city of Glasgow. Formerly a village in its own right, it lies to the southwest of the city and is bounded to the south by the White Cart Water. The area was part of Renfrewshire until 1926 when the villages of Cardonald, Crookston, Halfway and their surrounding farmland were annexed to Glasgow.

== Toponymy ==
This place-name was first recorded in 1413 as "Cardownalde" and means ("the fort of Donald"). Cair means 'a fort' or 'a fortified place', and Donald came from either the Gaelic male personal name Dòmhnall or its Cumbric equivalent Dyfnwal, both of which are usually anglicised as 'Donald' (three kings of Strathclyde were named Dyfnwal). The fortalice of Cardonald (known as the Place of Cardonald, Cardonald Castle, or Cardonald House) was first recorded in 1565, but the place-name suggests this later medieval structure was built on the site of an older fortification.

== History ==
In 1413 the lands of Cardownalde in Renfrewshire were the property of Johannes Norwald (John Norwald), dominus (lord) of Cardownalde. His granddaughter and heiress, Marion Stewart (daughter of Isabella Norwald of Cardonald and Sir William Stewart of Castlemilk), married Allan Stewart, establishing the line of Stewarts of Cardonald. The Cardonald Stewarts were a junior branch of the House of Stewart. Allan Stewart of Cardonald, the first Stewart of Cardonald, was the younger son of John Stewart, 1st Earl of Lennox. The Cardonald Stewarts had their seat at the Place of Cardonald (also known as Cardonald Castle or Cardonald House), built in 1565. It was demolished and replaced by a farmhouse – Cardonald Place Farm – in 1848. A corn mill existed in Cardonald from around 1789 until it was demolished in 1958. The site of Cardonald Mill is now occupied by the houses on Lade Terrace.

The line of the Stewarts of Cardonald ended with Allan's great-grandson, James Stewart of Cardonald (1512–1584). He had served as a captain in the Scottish Guards of the Kings of France, and is buried in Paisley Abbey. As he had no issue, the lands of Cardonald passed to his sister's son, Walter Stewart, 1st Lord Blantyre. His family resided at the Place of Cardonald for generations, and retained lands in Cardonald until the 20th century. With the death of the 12th Lord Blantyre in 1900, his estates passed to his grandson, William Arthur Baird.

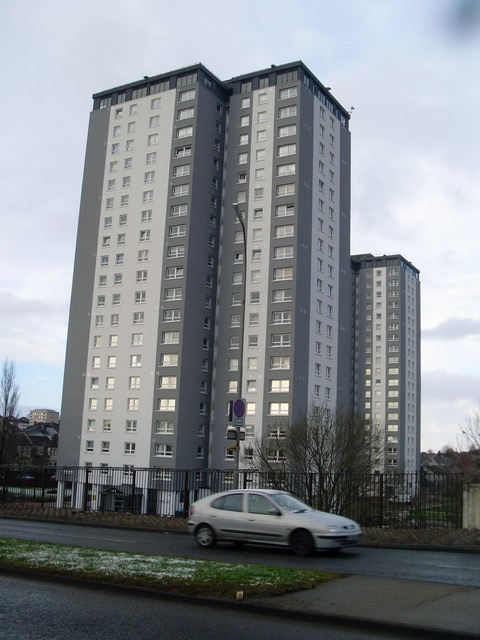
Highrise flats in Cardonald (2009)

The transformation of Cardonald from a rural to an urban community was largely brought about by the coming of the railway and the tram in the 19th century. The first railway to reach Cardonald was the Glasgow, Paisley and Greenock Railway, with a station (then known as Moss Road station) opening on Berryknowes Road in 1843. However, due to poor traffic returns, this station was closed in 1845. In 1879, the present day Cardonald railway station opened on the same site. The siting of this station influenced the building of the terrace of houses at Hillington Park Circus and the large country houses of Dalveon and Turnberry on Berryknowes Road, along with the terraced houses in Kingsland and Queensland Drive. There was also the lodge house on Berryknowes road next to Dalveon house which was part of the estate (now Craigton cemetery) that contained Cruickston Hall (now the site of the new Lourdes Primary School) and Craigton House.

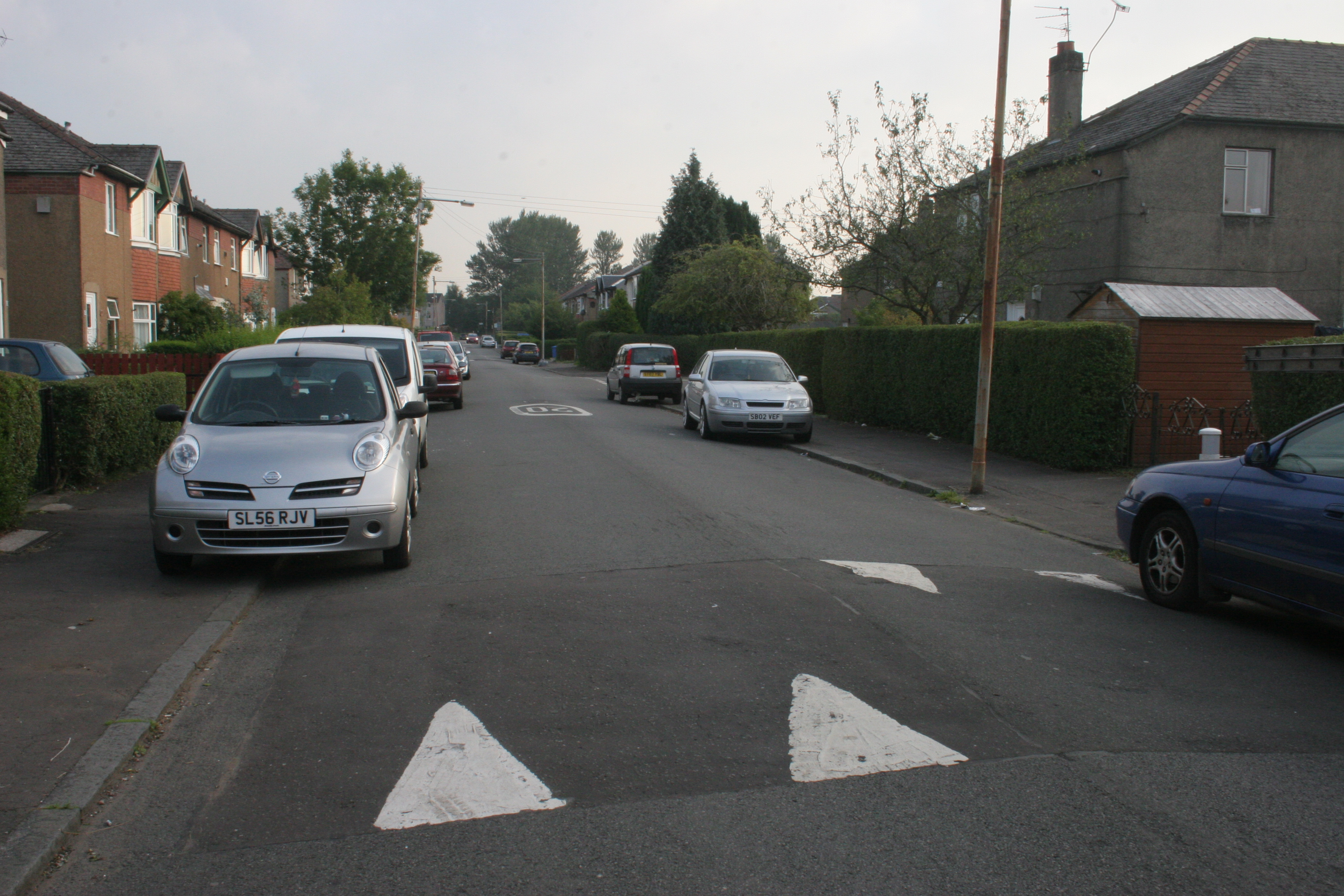
Muirdrum Avenue, South Cardonald (2015)

With the arrival of the electric tram in 1903, the growth of Cardonald began in earnest along the stretch of Paisley Road West between the villages of Cardonald and Halfway, with the building of Cardonald Police station (1905) and Nazareth House (1906). In 1926, Glasgow Corporation bought the Cardonald estates from William Arthur Baird. The final upsurge in house building in the area took place from 1931, when most of the existing farm land disappeared, with the building of the North Cardonald and South Cardonald houses by the Western Heritable Investment Company after 1935. North Cardonald was mostly made up of owner-occupied houses and council homes owned by Glasgow Corporation (the predecessor to Glasgow City Council), while South Cardonald was mostly composed of owner-occupied and privately rented cottage flats. The 1930s also saw the building of two cinemas in the area, The Westway (1934–1960) and the Aldwych/Vogue (1938–1964). The Westway later became the Flamingo ballroom, and was then a bingo hall until its demolition in 2003. The Vogue was demolished in 1964. Both have supermarkets in their place today.

In the 1950s, the Corporation erected the UK's first high-rise flats in the area. Although only 10 storeys high, the Moss Heights flats were the first of many high-rise blocks to be built in Glasgow. They were revolutionary in the fact that their heating system was supplied from a central coal-fired boiler house. They have been renovated and survive well into the 21st century, unlike other developments constructed in later decades.

== Education ==
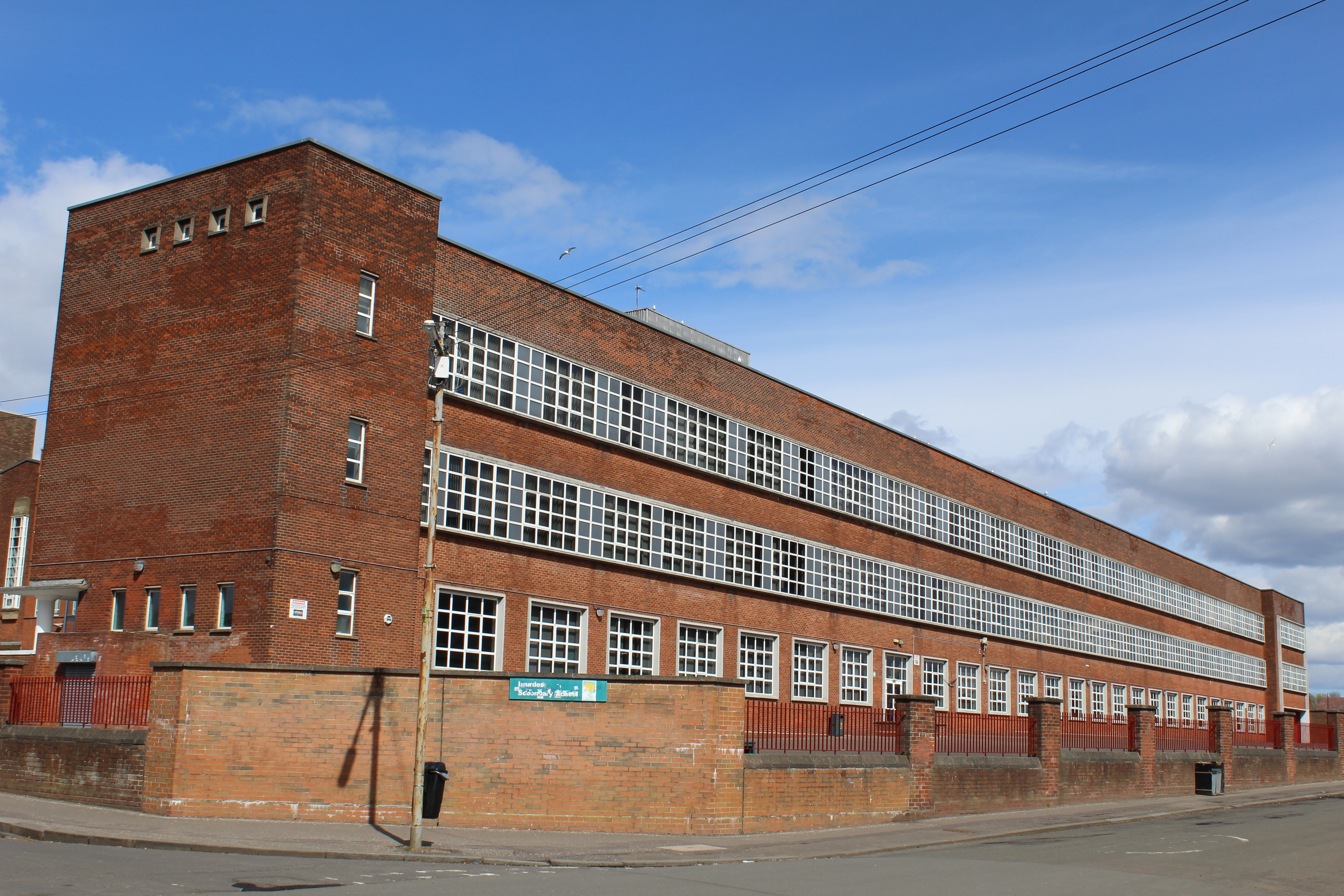
Lourdes Secondary School (2013)

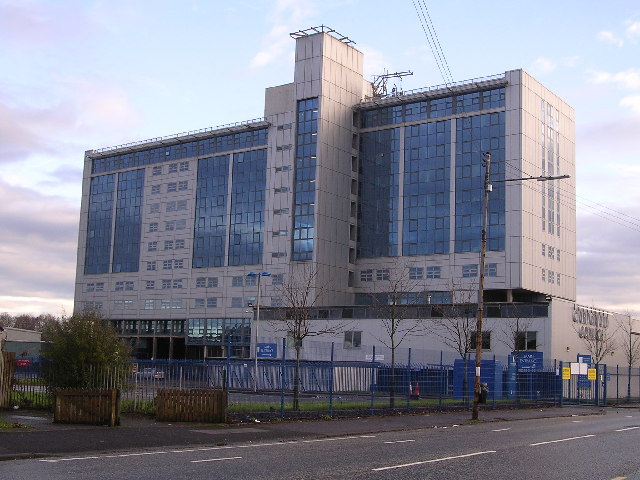
Cardonald Campus of Glasgow Clyde College (2005)

The first school in the vicinity of Cardonald was established at Halfway in 1790, by a local blacksmith who taught the rudiments of reading, writing and arithmetic. In 1860, Cardonald School was established when a school building and teacher's house were built at the corner of Paisley Road West and Lammermoor Avenue. The two-roomed, single-storey school building was extended in 1899 with the addition of a second storey, and was further extended in 1911.

Cardonald School remained the only school in the area until the 1930s when Lourdes Primary School and Angus Oval Primary School were built. Cardonald School transferred to the new building (built on the site of the former Angus Oval Primary School) in 1965. NB Angus Oval had acted as an annexe for Cardonald Primary for some years - handling Primaries 1 and 2 until around 1963. The old Cardonald School building on Paisley Rd. West was used as a careers office and for a number of other uses, before being demolished in 2003. In the heart of north Cardonald was Belses Primary school. Sited on Belses Drive at the junction of Kingsland Drive. This was an annexe for the larger Hillington Primary school. After this wooden school was demolished a new school was built on the existing playing field at Hallrule drive. The Roman Catholic Lourdes Secondary School was opened in 1956.

Cardonald College, one of Scotland's largest further education colleges, opened in 1972. It merged with Anniesland College and Langside College in August 2013 to form Glasgow Clyde College, and was renamed Cardonald Campus.

== Religion ==
The oldest church in the area is Cardonald Parish Church (Church of Scotland), which was built at the corner of Paisley Road West and Cardonald Place Road on a plot of ground which was donated by Lord Blantyre. The red sandstone church, designed by Peter Macgregor Chalmers, was built 1887-1889 and was dedicated in February 1889. The west wing was added in 1899 and the east wing in 1925, while the church halls were built in 1940.

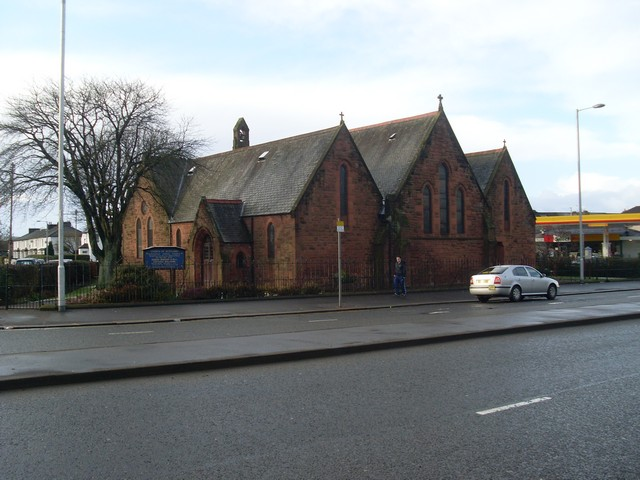
Cardonald Parish Church (2009)

Hillington Park Parish Church (Church of Scotland) was originally called “Cardonald United Free Church”, with the current church hall on Berryknowes Road being built as a parish church of the United Free Church of Scotland in 1908. The harled red sandstone church was built 1924-1925. With the union of the United Free Church and the Church of Scotland in 1929, the church was renamed as Hillington Park Parish Church.

The local Roman Catholic church, Our Lady of Lourdes, was designed by Stellmacs Ltd and built 1937-1939. This church, which opened in May 1939, replaced an earlier small chapel which had been built on the site in 1922. The local Catholic community had originally met in Maryland House and then from 1906 in the chapel of Nazareth House.

The Church of the Good Shepherd (Scottish Episcopal Church) on Hillington Road was designed by Noad & Wallace and was built 1939-1940. Before this church was built, the congregation, which was formed in 1938, had met in a shop at 2222 Paisley Road West.

== Amenities ==
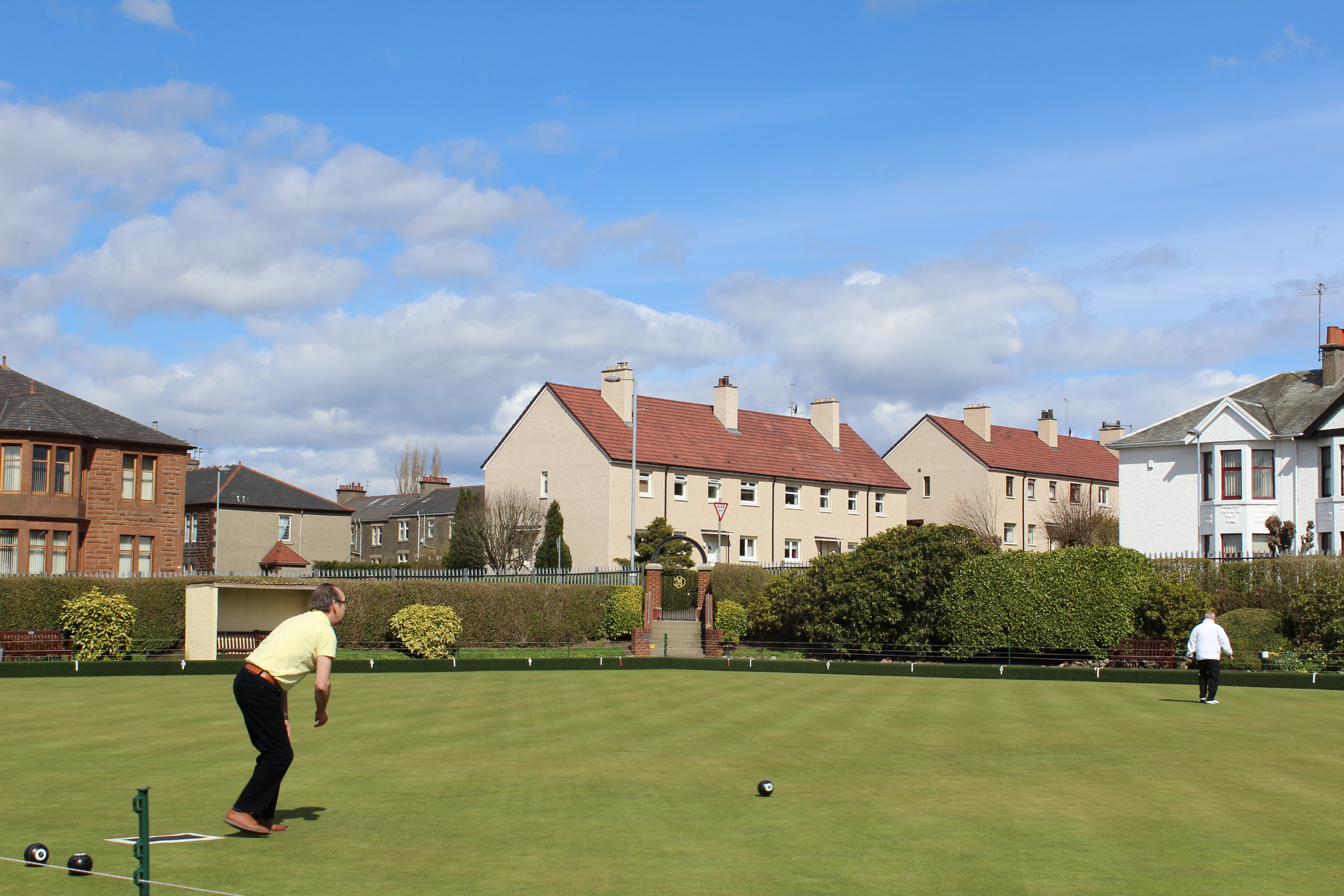
Cardonald Bowling Club (2013)

Cardonald Bowling Club was established in 1914 and is a popular club within the area.

== Transport ==
The district is served by Cardonald railway station on the Inverclyde Line and by Mosspark railway station on the Paisley Canal line, as well as numerous bus routes. There is also easy access to the Clyde Tunnel and the M8 motorway via Junction 25.

The number 9 and 9A buses (First Bus) and 38 (McGills) pass regularly along Paisley Road West. There are around ten buses per hour during peak times, and around four buses per hour early morning and in the evenings and on Sundays.

== See also ==
- Glasgow tower blocks
