= Glasgow Pollok (Scottish Parliament constituency) =

Region or constituency of the Scottish Parliament

- Former burgh constituency for the Scottish Parliament

- Glasgow Pollok shown within the Glasgow electoral region and the region shown within Scotland
- Population: 81,004 (2019)

Former constituency
- Created: 1999
- Abolished: 2026
- Council area: Glasgow City
- Replaced by: Glasgow Cathcart and Pollok, Glasgow Central, Renfrewshire North and Cardonald, Glasgow Southside

Glasgow Pollok (Gaelic: Glaschu Pollaig) was a constituency of the Scottish Parliament, being one of eight constituencies within the Glasgow City council area. Under the additional-member system used for elections to the Scottish Parliament, the seat elected one Member of the Scottish Parliament (MSP) by the plurality (first past the post) method of election, and was also one of nine constituencies in the Glasgow electoral region, which elected seven additional members, in addition to the nine constituency MSPs, to produce a form of proportional representation for the region as a whole.

As a result of the second periodic review of Scottish Parliament boundaries in 2025, the constituency was abolished ahead of the 2026 Scottish Parliament election. Most of the former area was divided between the new seats of Glasgow Cathcart and Pollok, Glasgow Central and Renfrewshire North and Cardonald, with a portion also being transferred to Glasgow Southside.

Humza Yousaf, who served as the First Minister of Scotland from March 2023 until May 2024, held the seat for the Scottish National Party from the 2016 Scottish Parliament election until its abolition in 2026.

== Electoral region ==
During the period Glasgow Pollok was in existence, the other eight constituencies of the Glasgow region were; Glasgow Anniesland, Glasgow Cathcart, Glasgow Kelvin, Glasgow Maryhill and Springburn, Glasgow Provan, Glasgow Shettleston, Glasgow Southside and Rutherglen.

In this period the region covered all of the Glasgow City council area, and a north-western portion of the South Lanarkshire council area.

== Constituency boundaries ==
Map of boundaries from 2011

The Glasgow Pollok constituency was created at the same time as the Scottish Parliament, for the 1999 Scottish Parliament election, using the name and boundaries of the existing Glasgow Pollok constituency of the UK Parliament. Ahead of the 2005 United Kingdom general election, the constituencies used for the House of Commons were mostly amended, whilst the boundaries were retained for use in elections to the Scottish Parliament. There is now no longer any link between the two sets of boundaries.

=== Boundary review ===
The boundaries of the seat were altered by the first periodic review of Scottish Parliament boundaries; the first election under these new boundaries was the 2011 Scottish Parliament election. The following electoral wards of Glasgow City Council were used to define Glasgow Pollok at this review:

- In full: Greater Pollok, Craigton
- In part: Govan

== Member of the Scottish Parliament ==
Election	Member	Party
1999	Johann Lamont	Labour
2016	Humza Yousaf	SNP

== Election results ==
=== 2020s ===
2021 Scottish Parliament election: Glasgow Pollok
Party	Candidate	Constituency			Regional		
Party	Candidate	Votes	%	±%	Votes	%	±%
SNP	Humza Yousaf (Note: Incumbent member for this constituency)	18,163	53.7	▼1.1	16,600	49.1	▼0.4
Labour	Zubir Ahmed	11,058	32.7	▲1.1	8,899	26.3	▲0.5
Conservative	Sandesh Gulhane (Note: Elected on the party list)	1,849	5.5	▼4.0	3,832	11.3	▲2.2
Green	Nadia Kanyange	1,651	4.9	New	1,975	5.8	▲0.9
Alba					659	1.9	New
Liberal Democrats	James Speirs	522	1.5	▼0.6	455	1.3	0.0
All for Unity					318	0.9	New
Scottish Family					240	0.7	New
Independent Green Voice					180	0.5	New
Abolish the Scottish Parliament					105	0.3	New
UKIP	Daryl Gardner	185	0.5	New	95	0.3	▼1.8
Freedom Alliance (UK)					76	0.2	New
Scottish Libertarian	Alan Findlay	157	0.5	New	75	0.2	New
TUSC					62	0.2	New
Women's Equality					58	0.2	▼0.4
Communist					51	0.2	New
Reform					50	0.1	New
Reclaim	Leo Kearse	114	0.3	New	32	0.1	New
No label	Joseph Finnie	94	0.3	New			
Independent	Craig Ross				25	0.1	New
SDP					20	0.1	New
Renew					11	0.03	New
Independent	Daniel Donaldson				10	0.03	New
Majority		7,105	21.0	▼2.2			
Valid votes		33,793			33,828		
Invalid votes		131			87		
Turnout		33,924	54.3	▲8.5	33,915	54.3	▲8.4
SNP hold		Swing					

=== 2010s ===
2016 Scottish Parliament election: Glasgow Pollok
Party	Candidate	Constituency			Regional		
Party	Candidate	Votes	%	±%	Votes	%	±%
SNP	Humza Yousaf (Note: Incumbent member on the party list, or for another constituency)	15,316	54.8	▲10.1	13,902	49.5	▲7.4
Labour Co-op	Johann Lamont (Note: Lamont stood on a joint ticket on behalf of Scottish Labour and the Scottish Co-operative Party. The regional list vote was for Scottish Labour only.) (Note: Incumbent member for this constituency)	8,834	31.6	▼15.8	7,237	25.8	▼12.3
Conservative	Thomas Haddow	2,653	9.5	▲3.8	2,545	9.1	▲4.9
Liberal Democrats	Isabel Nelson	585	2.1	0.0	375	1.3	▼0.1
TUSC	Ian Leech	555	2.0	New			
Green					1,363	4.9	▲2.4
Solidarity					915	3.3	New
UKIP					582	2.1	▲1.6
BUP					341	1.2	New
Animal Welfare					224	0.8	New
Scottish Christian					212	0.8	0.0
RISE					185	0.7	New
Women's Equality					158	0.6	New
Independent	Andrew McCullagh				25	0.1	New
Majority		6,482	23.2	N/A			
Valid votes		27,943			28,064		
Invalid votes		142			69		
Turnout		28,085	45.8	▲6.3	28,133	45.9	▲6.4
SNP gain from Labour Co-op		Swing		▲13.0			
Notes

Scottish Parliament Election 2011: Glasgow Pollok
Party	Candidate	Constituency			Regional		
Party	Candidate	Votes	%	±%	Votes	%	±%
Labour Co-op	Johann Lamont (Note: Lamont stood on a joint ticket on behalf of Scottish Labour and the Scottish Co-operative Party. The regional list vote was for Scottish Labour only.) (Note: Incumbent member for this constituency)	10,875	47.5	N/A	8,760	38.1	N/A
SNP	Chris Stephens	10,252	44.7	N/A	9,713	42.2	N/A
Conservative	Andrew Morrison	1,298	5.7	N/A	963	4.2	N/A
Respect					664	2.9	N/A
All-Scotland Pensioners Party					617	2.7	N/A
Green					571	2.5	N/A
Socialist Labour					369	1.6	N/A
BNP					330	1.4	N/A
Liberal Democrats	Isabel Nelson	490	2.1	N/A	325	1.4	N/A
Scottish Christian					192	0.8	N/A
Scottish Unionist					158	0.7	N/A
UKIP					126	0.5	N/A
Scottish Socialist					100	0.4	N/A
Pirate					55	0.2	N/A
Independent	Caroline Johnstone				25	0.1	N/A
Scottish Homeland Party					24	0.1	N/A
Majority		623	2.8	N/A			
Valid votes		22,915			22,992		
Invalid votes		154			97		
Turnout		23,069	39.5	N/A	23,089	39.5	N/A
Labour win (new boundaries)							

=== 2000s ===
Scottish Parliament Election 2007: Glasgow Pollok
Party	Candidate	Votes	%	±%
Labour Co-op	Johann Lamont	10,456	53.9	+10.5
SNP	Chris Stephens	6,063	31.2	+12.1
Conservative	Gerald Michaluk	1,460	7.5	+2.8
Liberal Democrats	Christine Gilmore	1,436	7.4	+2.9
Majority		4,393	22.7	+7.2
Turnout		19,415		
Labour Co-op hold		Swing		

Scottish Parliament Election 2003: Glasgow Pollok
Party	Candidate	Votes	%	±%
Labour Co-op	Johann Lamont	9,357	43.4	−0.3
Scottish Socialist	Tommy Sheridan	6,016	27.9	+6.4
SNP	Kenny Gibson	4,118	19.1	−6.8
Conservative	Ashraf Anjum	1,012	4.7	−0.6
Liberal Democrats	Isabel Nelson	962	4.5	+0.9
Parent Excluded	Robert Ray	73	0.3	New
Majority		3,341	15.5	−2.3
Turnout		21,538	45.7	−6.9
Labour Co-op hold		Swing	-0.3	

=== 1990s ===
,

Scottish Parliament Election 1999: Glasgow Pollok
Party	Candidate	Votes	%	±%
Labour Co-op	Johann Lamont	11,405	43.7	N/A
SNP	Kenny Gibson	6,763	25.9	N/A
Scottish Socialist	Tommy Sheridan	5,611	21.5	N/A
Conservative	Rory O'Brien	1,370	5.3	N/A
Liberal Democrats	James King	931	3.6	N/A
Majority		4,642	17.8	N/A
Turnout		26,080	52.6	N/A
Labour Co-op win (new seat)				

== See also ==
- Glasgow Pollok (UK Parliament constituency)
- Politics of Glasgow

== Footnotes ==
Preceded by Glasgow Southside	Constituency represented by the First Minister; 2023 – 2024	Succeeded by Perthshire North
