= List of Category A listed buildings in Glasgow =

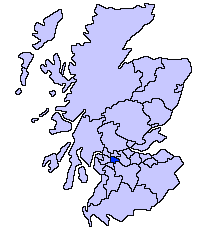
Glasgow shown within Scotland

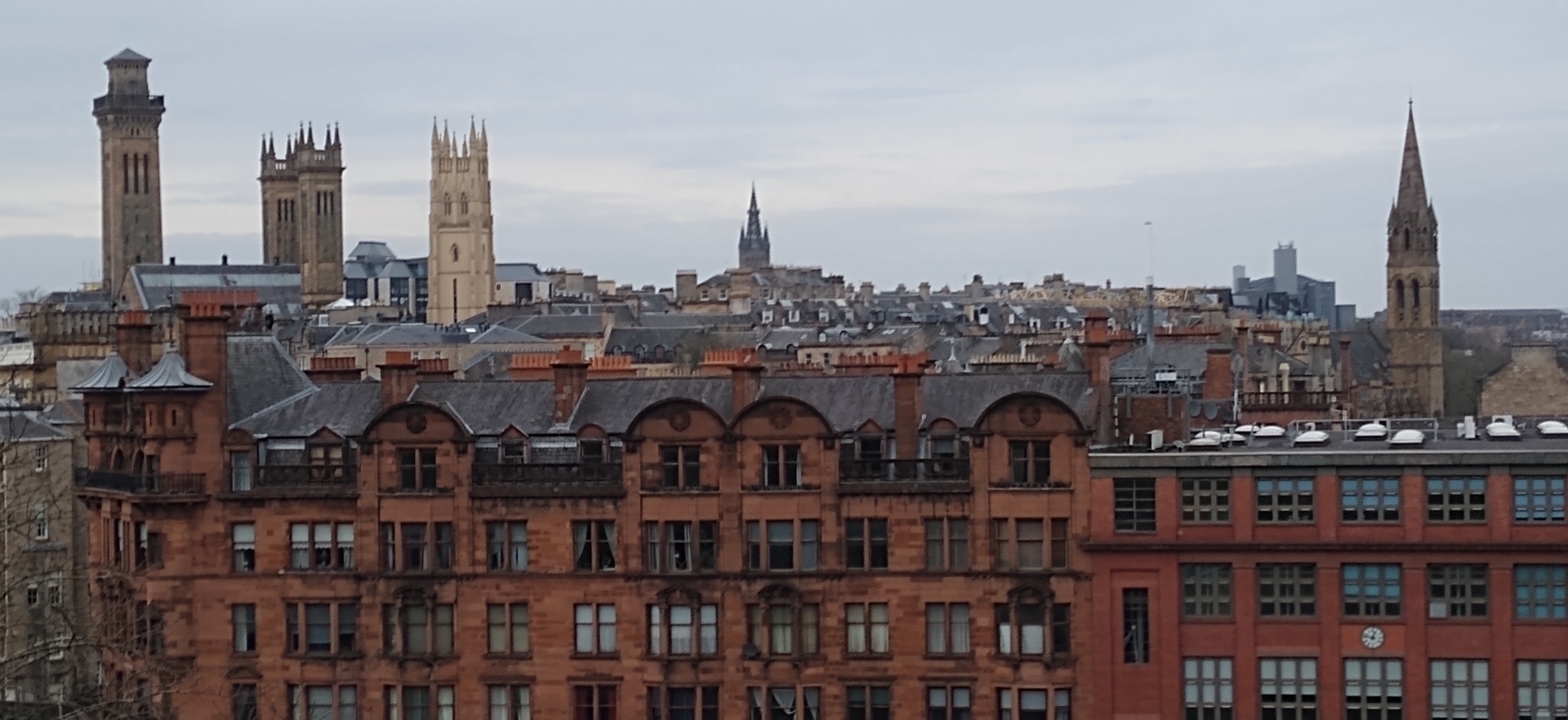
Skyline of Hillhead, Glasgow as seen from Garnethill. The towers of Trinity College and Glasgow University are visible.

This is a list of Category A listed buildings in Glasgow, Scotland.

In Scotland, the term listed building refers to a building or other structure officially designated as being of "special architectural or historic interest". Category A structures are those considered to be "buildings of national or international importance, either architectural or historic, or fine little-altered examples of some particular period, style or building type." Listing was begun by a provision in the Town and Country Planning (Scotland) Act 1947, and the current legislative basis for listing is the Planning (Listed Buildings and Conservation Areas) (Scotland) Act 1997. The authority for listing rests with Historic Scotland, an executive agency of the Scottish Government, which inherited this role from the Scottish Development Department in 1991. Once listed, severe restrictions are imposed on the modifications allowed to a building's structure or its fittings. Listed building consent must be obtained from local authorities prior to any alteration to such a structure. There are approximately 47,400 listed buildings in Scotland, of which around 8% (some 3,800) are Category A.

The medieval city of Glasgow formed around two axes, that of the High Street and the Saltmarket which was bisected by Trongate and Gallowgate at Glasgow Cross. Despite its ancient origins very little of the medieval fabric of the city survives. Only two buildings from the earliest period are extant in Glasgow; the Cathedral and the former canon's house. Nor do the riggs and wynds of the old city remain, though a great deal of the original street pattern has persisted down the centuries. Additionally, a mere handful of buildings from the period between the Reformation and the end of the eighteenth century have come down to us. The majority of the city's building stock, then, is nineteenth century when the population of Glasgow rose from c. 78,000 in 1801 to 770,000 in 1901. The pattern of expansion can be traced from the commercial centre of the High Street and Merchant City westwards to the Blythswood Hill New Town laid out in the 1820s and 30s, and south of the river in Laurieston and Tradeston. The feus of both these developments were, unusually for the British Isles, laid out on a gridiron pattern. Further development came with the construction of the Woodlands and Park District areas, the latter of which was the work of Charles Wilson, in the 1830s and 40s. With the relocation of the University from the High street to Gilmorehill in the 1860s came the expansion of the city to the west where suburbs at Dowanhill and Partickhill were laid out on the garden principal with villas and cottages in a number of styles. Similarly, the coming of the railways and trams permitted the development of the suburbs of Pollokshields and Langside to the south. In 1866 the city corporation established the City Improvement Trust to control planning and clear slums. The outlying burghs were amalgamated into the City Corporation in 1891 and in the following decades the city witnessed its peak population of circa 1.1 million. With the post-war period came the proposals of the Bruce Plan in 1945 and the Clyde Valley Report in 1946. The former recommended the phased replacement of the entire city centre and its encirclement with a ring-road, of which scheme only the M8 at Charing Cross and Anderston was completed. The latter advised the displacement of the population of the City centre to New Towns and peripheral estates which led to the contraction of the city's population and the wholesale redevelopment of areas such as the Gorbals and Townhead.

The architectural character of Glasgow has been described as follows: “[t]he architecture of the City Centre exhibits a distinctive confidence from the late 18th century into the 21st century that makes it unique in Scotland. Although a variety of architectural styles exist, there are certain Glasgow characteristics: depth of modelling; wealth of ornamentation and sculpture; animated roofline; and consistent building lines and predominantly flat (not stepped or curved) linear elevations along the backs of the pavements. Glasgow architects and engineers were, and remain, frequent pioneers of new building technology and materials.” Perhaps the most striking quality of Glasgow's urban form is the eclectic mix of styles which it exhibits. Of those belonging to the early nineteenth century include: the neoclassicism of William Stark and David Hamilton; a vigorous tradition of Greek Revival, possibly the longest lasting in Britain, which persisted down to the 1890s; Italianate evidenced in the Western Club and Rochead's 2 St Vincent St.; and Gothic Revival notably practised by Leiper and G. Gilbert Scott. By the mid-century Glasgow had produced its first native architect of national and later international importance in Alexander Thomson, whose eclectic historicism produced its own school. Later nineteenth-century work includes the art nouveau inspired buildings of James Salmon, particularly the “Hatrack” on St Vincent St.; the Beaux arts style common to many public buildings of the period especially the City Chambers; Mackintosh's art and crafts inflected work; Edwardian Baroque revival; and the distinctive free Glasgow Style of Millar and the later Salmon. The inter-war period sees the use of Art Deco and some reference to the Chicago Style in the elevator buildings demanded by commerce of the time, specifically in James Miller's St Vincent St. Bank of Scotland and 98 West George Street. Post-war there is the creative application of Functionalism in the work of Jack Coia and Brutalism elsewhere in the city's redevelopment. The best of Glasgow's historic architecture was metropolitan in its ambition, as the Buildings of Scotland remarks: “A visitor with time to spare will find that the city centre is rich with remarkable buildings from the height of its industrial prosperity and that its grandest suburbs are planned on a scale comparable with many European capitals.”

== Listed buildings ==
Name	Location	Date listed	Geo-coordinates	Notes	LB number	Image
Trinity College	31, 33, 35 Lynedoch Street and 92, 96 Woodside Terrace Lane	15 December 1970	55°52′05″N 4°16′34″W	1856 architect Charles Wilson.	32171	Upload another image See more images
Arlington Baths Club	61 Arlington Street	20 May 1986	55°52′15″N 4°16′24″W	1871 by John Burnet Senior. Additions by A Myles of 1893 and B Conner of 1902.	32173	Upload another image See more images
1-12 Claremont Terrace	Claremont Terrace	15 December 1970	55°52′04″N 4°16′40″W	John Baird I, architect; 1842-1847. No 6 built first as freestanding mansion in 1842. Remainder of Terrace added in 1847.Includes 1 Claremont Place, and gatepiers to Claremont Terrace Lane	32185	Upload another image
Great Western Road Bridge over River Kelvin	West End	20 May 1986	55°52′29″N 4°16′47″W	Bell and Miller, engineers; Morrison and Mason, contractors; Sir W Arrol, iron and steel work. Begun April 1890, opened September 1891.	32197	Upload another image See more images
St Mary's Episcopal Cathedral	300 Great Western Road/Holyrood Crescent	15 December 1970	55°52′25″N 4°16′30″W	George Gilbert Scott, architect, 1871-8. Spire by John Oldrid Scott, completed 1893.	32198	Upload another image See more images
445-459 (Odd Nos) Great Western Road and 6 Caledonian Crescent, 1-8 (Inclusive Nos) Caledonian Mansions		15 December 1970	55°52′30″N 4°16′52″W	1897-8 by James Millar. Free Arts and Crafts/ Glasgow Style terrace of tenements.	32200	Upload another image
Lansdowne Parish Church (Church of Scotland)	416 and 420 Great Western Road/433 North Woodside Road	15 December 1970	55°52′28″N 4°16′41″W	1863, John Honeyman. Sculptor; John Mossman.	32205	Upload another image See more images
Roberts Memorial	Kelvingrove Park	15 December 1970	55°52′13″N 4°16′55″W	Unveiled in 1916; replica of monument by Harry Bates ARA in Calcutta to Field Marshal Earl Roberts, erected in 1915.	32211	Upload another image See more images
Stewart Memorial Fountain	Kelvingrove Park	15 December 1970	55°52′05″N 4°17′02″W	1872 James Sellars, architect; John Mossman, sculptor; H Pringle & Co bronze founders.	32213	Upload another image See more images
41-53 (Odd Nos) Oakfield Avenue and 18 Great George Street		15 December 1970	55°52′27″N 4°17′04″W	1865 by Alexander Thomson.	32235	Upload another image
1-29 (Inclusive Nos) Park Circus and 9 Park Street South	Park District	15 December 1970	55°52′11″N 4°16′41″W	1855-6 by Charles Wilson. Nos 1-16 built 1857-9; Nos 18-22 built 1861-3 (No 22 by J Boucher 1872); Nos 23-29 built 1872-3. Includes 22 Park Circus, Glasgow	32238	Upload another image See more images
1-17 (Odd Nos) and 2-8 (Even Nos) Park Circus Place	Park District	15 December 1970	55°52′07″N 4°16′40″W	Charles Wilson, architect: designed 1855-6 built 1872-3.	32239	Upload another image
1-6 (Inclusive Nos) Park Gardens and Park Gardens Lane	Park District	15 December 1970	55°52′05″N 4°16′49″W	Charles Wilson, architect; circa 1855.	32240	Upload another image
Park Gardens, Stairway to Park Street South	Park District	15 December 1970	55°52′05″N 4°16′49″W	1853-4, Charles Wilson.	32241	Upload another image
1-5 (Odd Nos Inclusive) and 4 Park Gate	Park District	15 December 1970	55°52′10″N 4°16′49″W	1857-9, Charles Wilson.	32242	Upload another image
1-10 (Inclusive Nos) Park Quadrant	Park District	15 December 1970	55°52′14″N 4°16′46″W	Charles Wilson, architect; circa 1855-8.	32243	Upload another image
1-21 (Inclusive Nos) Park Terrace and 18-24 (Inclusive Nos) Woodlands Terrace and 2-4 (Even Nos) Park Terrace East Lane and 3 Park Street South	Park District	15 December 1970	55°52′07″N 4°16′46″W	Charles Wilson, 1855.	32245	Upload another image
Park Terrace Balustrade Railings and Gateway	Kelvingrove Park	15 December 1970	55°52′12″N 4°16′52″W	Charles Wilson, architect, circa 1855.	32246	Upload another image
Stairway to Clifton Street	Woodlands Terrace	15 December 1970	55°52′05″N 4°16′45″W	Circa 1855.	32267	Upload another image
6-19 (Inclusive No) Woodside Crescent		15 December 1970	55°52′03″N 4°16′19″W	1831, George Smith.	32268	Upload another image
1-28 (Inclusive Nos) Woodside Place and 138, 140 Elderslie Street		15 December 1970	55°52′01″N 4°16′23″W	1838, George Smith.	32270	Upload another image
1-22 (Inclusive Nos) Woodside Terrace, 11-63 Woodside Terrace Lane, 4 Claremount Place		15 December 1970	55°52′04″N 4°16′30″W	George Smith, architect. Nos 1-11, 1835; Nos 12-21, 1842.	32271	Upload another image
North British Engine Works	739 South Street	22 August 1984	55°52′23″N 4°20′40″W	J Galt architect, 1913-14. Steel framed, brick and glass building modelled on Peter Behren's A E G Turbine Factory in Berlin (1909).	32280	Upload another image
Former North British Diesel Engine Engine Works, Quayside Titan Crane	739 South Street	14 April 1989	55°52′21″N 4°20′44″W	Ordered 1913, completed 1920; by Sir William Arrol and Co Ltd.	32281	Upload another image
48 Cleveden Drive, Stoneleigh, and Gatepiers		15 December 1970	55°53′01″N 4°18′15″W	H E Clifford, built circa 1900-10.	32306	Upload another image
Forth and Clyde Canal Aqueduct	Adjoining Skaethorn Road Bridge	10 July 1989	55°53′33″N 4°18′06″W	Robert Whitworth, engineer, 1787-90.	32316	Upload another image See more images
Gartnavel Royal Hospital	1055 Great Western Road	15 December 1970	55°53′01″N 4°19′09″W	1841-3, Charles Wilson.	32318	Upload another image See more images
St Mungo's Academy Centenary Club	998 Great Western Road	15 December 1970	55°53′01″N 4°18′17″W	1877, James Boucher.	32334	Upload another image
11 Whittinghame Drive		5 September 1979	55°53′05″N 4°18′54″W	John Ednie, 1907.	32342	Upload another image
Ruchill Church Hall	17 Shakespeare Street	15 December 1970	55°53′12″N 4°17′02″W	Charles Rennie Mackintosh, 1899.	32356	Upload another image See more images
Queen's Park Church and Hall	20 Balvicar Drive, Balvicar Street, Camphill	15 December 1970	55°50′03″N 4°16′16″W	William Leiper, 1875-8.	32359	Upload another image See more images
Langside Hall	1 Langside Avenue	15 December 1970	55°49′53″N 4°16′39″W	John Gibson (of Gibson and MacDougall) 1847-9 as National Bank of Scotland, Queen Street; re-erected without significant change on this site 1901; A B MacDonald City Engineer, assistant in charge named Horne.	32369	Upload another image See more images
25, 25A Mansionhouse Road		15 December 1970	55°49′32″N 4°16′30″W	Alexander Thomson, 1856-7.	32373	Upload another image See more images
2, 2A-38 (Even Nos) Millbrae Crescent		15 December 1970	55°49′20″N 4°16′33″W	1876-7 in style of Robert Turnbull.	32384	Upload another image See more images
1-10 (Inclusive Nos) Moray Place Including 81 Nithsdale Road		6 July 1966	55°50′14″N 4°16′25″W	Built 1859-60, design perhaps 1857, by Alexander Thomson. Thomson himself resided at No 1.	32386	Upload another image See more images
Camphill House	799 Pollokshaws Road	15 December 1970	55°49′56″N 4°16′31″W	Possibly David Hamilton as architect. Built for Robert Thomson, cotton manufacturer, probably circa 1798.	32401	Upload another image See more images
265-289 (Odd Nos) Allison Street, 19, 21, 23 Garturk Street and 34 Daisy Street		15 December 1970	55°50′09″N 4°15′32″W	Alexander Thomson (d 1875), 1875-7, and presumably completed by his partner, Robert Turnbull, in Thomson's own style.	32423	Upload another image See more images
Former Crosshill Queen's Park Church	40 Queen's Drive	15 December 1970	55°49′56″N 4°15′41″W	Campbell Douglas and Sellars, 1872-3.	32451	Upload another image See more images
Kelvinside Academy	20 Bellshaugh Road	6 July 1966	55°52′58″N 4°17′41″W	James Sellars, architect; 1877-9.	32476	Upload another image See more images
15 Cleveden Gardens		15 December 1970	55°53′05″N 4°17′59″W	1904, A N Prentice.	32486	Upload another image
3-10 (Inclusive Nos) Crown Circus and 1, 1A and 2 Crown Terrace and 15 and 17 Crown Road North		15 December 1970	55°52′34″N 4°18′03″W	James Thompson, 1858.	32489	Upload another image
Kibble Palace	Botanic Gardens, 730 Great Western Road	15 December 1970	55°52′44″N 4°17′18″W	John Kibble, engineer. Originally erected 1863-6 at Coulport, Loch Long; removed here and enlarged 1873.	32513	Upload another image See more images
1-11 (Inclusive Nos) Great Western Terrace, 2-34 (Even Nos) Great Western Terrace Lane, 1 and 1B Westbourne Gardens and 19 Westbourne Gardens	Great Western Road	15 December 1970	55°52′51″N 4°18′01″W	1869, Alexander Thomson.	32517	Upload another image
1-17 (Inclusive Nos) Grosvenor Terrace	Great Western Road	6 July 1966	55°52′41″N 4°17′31″W	J T Rochead, 1855. Eastern half of terrace gutted by fire in 1978, rebuilt 1980.	32520	Upload another image
21-39 (Odd Nos) Hyndland Road		6 July 1966	55°52′54″N 4°18′13″W	1871, Alexander Thomson.	32530	Upload another image
Hyndland Parish Church, Church of Scotland	79 Hyndland Road	15 December 1970	55°52′45″N 4°18′19″W	William Leiper, 1886.	32532	Upload another image See more images
3 Kirklee Road and 1 Redlands Road		15 December 1970	55°52′52″N 4°17′50″W	John A Campbell, circa 1902.	32550	Upload another image
7-23 (Odd Nos) Kirklee Road and 2 Redlands Road		15 December 1970	55°52′54″N 4°17′48″W	John A Campbell, 1900.	32551	Upload another image
1-14 (Inclusive Nos) Kirklee Terrace, and 1-14 Kirklee Terrace Lane (Inclusive Numbers)	Great Western Road	6 July 1966	55°52′49″N 4°17′40″W	1845, Charles Wilson.	32553	Upload another image
9 Lowther Terrace	Great Western Road	15 December 1970	55°52′53″N 4°17′56″W	Sydney Mitchell, 1904-6.	32563	Upload another image
10 Lowther Terrace	Great Western Road	15 December 1970	55°52′53″N 4°17′56″W	James Miller, 1904.	32564	Upload another image
Notre Dame High School	160 Observatory Road	28 July 1987	55°52′42″N 4°17′57″W	Thomas S Cordiner, designed 1939, resumed 1949 completed 1953. Damaged by fire, 2010	32571	Upload another image See more images
1 Prince's Terrace	Prince Albert Road	15 December 1970	55°52′37″N 4°18′03″W	James Thomson, circa 1870.	32576	Upload another image
Kelvinside Hillhead Parish Church, Glasgow	23 Saltoun Street	15 December 1970	55°52′39″N 4°17′36″W	James Sellars, 1875-6.Church of Scotland. Formerly Belmont and Hillhead Parish Church.	32584	Upload another image See more images
Belhaven-Westbourne Church and Hall, Church of Scotland	52 Westbourne Gardens	15 December 1970	55°52′53″N 4°18′12″W	1881, John Honeyman.	32605	Upload another image
145-195 (Odd Nos) Albion Street		3 September 1974	55°51′36″N 4°14′38″W	Sir Owen Williams, 1936; 1986 alterations and large additions. Roof top addition by Frank Burnet, Bell and Partners, 1986-1988.	32607	Upload another image
Buck's Head Building	63 Argyle Street	15 December 1970	55°51′27″N 4°15′05″W	Alexander Thomson, 1863.	32608	Upload another image
Argyle Street, Argyll Arcade (Through 98-102 Argyle Street) 3-66 (Inclusive Nos, Leading to Buchanan Street)	Argyle Street	15 December 1970	55°51′30″N 4°15′12″W	John Baird I, 1827.	32613	Upload another image
David Sloan's Arcade Cafe	62 Argyll Arcade/108 Argyle Street, Morrison Court	15 December 1970	55°51′31″N 4°15′13″W	Possibly by John Baird 1827-8; interior remodelled by Charles H Robinson 1900.	32614	Upload another image
Martyrs' Public School	17 Parson Street.	15 December 1970	55°51′55″N 4°14′15″W	Charles Rennie Mackintosh (of John Honeyman and Keppie), 1895-1898.	32619	Upload another image See more images
60-62 (Even Nos) Buchanan Street	Buchanan Street	15 December 1970	55°51′34″N 4°15′15″W	Robert Thomson (with Andrew Wilson assisting), 1894-96.	32635	Upload another image
92-100 (Even Nos) Buchanan Street, known as 98 Buchanan Street	Buchanan Street	15 December 1970	55°51′37″N 4°15′14″W	Charles Wilson, 1850-51.	32639	Upload another image
Britannia Buildings	164A-168 (Even Nos) Buchanan Street with 10 Dundas Lane	15 December 1970	55°51′45″N 4°15′11″W	John A Campbell, 1898.	32643	Upload another image See more images
Glasgow City Halls	Candleriggs, Merchant City	15 December 1970	55°51′32″N 4°14′43″W	Main hall facade to Candleriggs John Carrick, 1885. Complex site with multiple architects over time.	32647	Upload another image See more images
Provand's Lordship	3 Castle Street	6 July 1966	55°51′45″N 4°14′13″W	1471 with extensions to the West of 1670.	32648	Upload another image See more images
Bridge of Sighs and Superintendent's House	Cathedral Square	15 December 1970	55°51′45″N 4°14′08″W	David and James Hamilton architects, 1833-40. Includes gates and gatepiers by David Hamilton, 1838, ironwork of gates by T Edington.	32651	Upload another image
Glasgow Evangelical Church; (Former Barony North Church), and Church House	20 Cathedral Square, 14 Cathedral Square	15 December 1970	55°51′41″N 4°14′06″W	John Honeyman, 1878.	32652	Upload another image See more images
Glasgow Cathedral and Cathedral Graveyard	70 Cathedral Square	15 December 1970	55°51′50″N 4°14′04″W	A new cathedral to serve the diocese of Glasgow was begun circa 1118 and consecrated in 1136. Further works in the 1180s prior to its second consecration in 1197. Subsequent campaigns of work include the Blackadder aisle completed between 1483 and 1508.	32654	Upload another image See more images
Statue of William III	Cathedral Square	6 July 1966	55°51′42″N 4°14′11″W	Presented 1835 by Governor Macrae of Madras. Equestrian bronze of William III (as Emperor Constantine), sculptor unknown.	32660	Upload another image See more images
Former Our Lady and St Francis Secondary School	72 Charlotte Street	4 September 1989	55°51′13″N 4°14′29″W	Jack Coia of Gillespie, Kidd & Coia, 1963.	32662	Upload another image See more images
52 Charlotte Street		15 December 1970	55°51′16″N 4°14′27″W	Built circa 1790, school of Robert Adam.	32663	Upload another image
Old Fish Market known as the Briggait	72 Clyde Street and 135 Bridgegate	15 October 1970	55°51′16″N 4°14′58″W	Clarke and Bell, 1873.	32664	Upload another image See more images
Merchants Steeple, now enclosed within The Briggait	72 Clyde Street, Bridgegate	6 July 1966	55°51′17″N 4°14′57″W	Completed 1665.	32665	Upload another image
St Andrew's Roman Catholic Cathedral	168 Clyde Street and Fox Lane	15 December 1970	55°51′20″N 4°15′10″W	J Gillespie Graham, 1814-17.	32666	Upload another image See more images
Albert Bridge	Clyde Street	22 March 1977	55°51′09″N 4°14′50″W	Bell and Miller, architects and engineers, Hanna, Donald and Wilson contractors; 1868-1871.	32667	Upload another image See more images
South Portland Street Suspension Bridge	Clyde Street and South Portland Street	6 July 1966	55°51′18″N 4°15′20″W	Alexander Kirkland, architect. George Martin, engineer. 1851-3.	32668	Upload another image See more images
Victoria Bridge	Clyde Street	15 December 1970	55°51′14″N 4°15′04″W	James Walker, engineer; 1851-1854.	32669	Upload another image See more images
Formerly the John Street Church	29 Cochrane Street and 18 John Street	15 December 1970	55°51′36″N 4°14′51″W	J T Rochead, 1859.	32672	Upload another image
Extension to the City Chambers	20-40 (Even Nos) Cochrane Street, 20 John Street and 233-235 (Odd Nos) George Street	15 December 1970	55°51′40″N 4°14′51″W	Watson Salmond and Gray, 1913-1929.	32675	Upload another image
Former General Post Office	George Square	15 December 1970	55°51′37″N 4°15′00″W	Original building Robert Mathieson, architect H M Office of Public Works for Scotland, 1875-8. Rear elevation to Ingram Street remodelled by W W Robertson in 1892-4. Side elevations enclosing Robertson's work, by W T Oldrieve and C J W Simpson, 1914-16.	32685	Upload another image
24 George Square and 12-16 (Even Nos) Anchor Lane	George Square	15 December 1970	55°51′41″N 4°15′07″W	James Sellars, 1874.	32688	Upload another image See more images
The Merchants' House	30 George Square and 7 West George Street	15 December 1970	55°51′41″N 4°15′06″W	John Burnet, 1874-8, 3-storey and basement office building, raised by J J Burnet 1907-8, by 2 storeys and an attic. Sculpture by Young.	32689	Upload another image
Glasgow City Chambers	80 George Square	15 December 1970	55°51′40″N 4°14′55″W	William Young, architect, 1882-1888, interior 1887-1890. Contractors, Morrison and Mason. Sculpture by John Mossman and George Lawson.	32691	Upload another image See more images
Walter Scott Memorial Column	George Square	6 July 1966	55°51′40″N 4°15′01″W	Column and base by David Rhind, 1837. Statue designed by John Greenshields, executed by A Handyside Ritchie.	32696	Upload another image See more images
James Watt Statue	George Square	6 July 1966	55°51′40″N 4°15′04″W	Francis Chantrey, 1832.	32697	Upload another image See more images
Statue of Sir John Moore	George Square	6 July 1966	55°51′39″N 4°14′58″W	John Flaxman, 1819.	32698	Upload another image See more images
Equestrian statue of Albert, Prince Consort (Glasgow)	George Square	15 December 1970	55°51′40″N 4°15′04″W	Baron Carlo Marochetti, pre-1854.	32701	Upload another image See more images
Equestrian statue of Victoria (Glasgow)	George Square	15 December 1970	55°51′41″N 4°15′04″W	Baron Carlo Marochetti, pre-1854.	32702	Upload another image See more images
266 George Street		9 March 1989	55°51′42″N 4°14′53″W	Thomson and Sandilands, 1900.	32709	Upload another image
The Trades Hall of Glasgow	85 Glassford Street	6 July 1966	55°51′33″N 4°14′57″W	Robert Adam, 1791-9, completed posthumously. David Hamilton extensions at rear 1838, interior recast by James Sellars in 1887-8 partially or totally refaced by John Keppie 1927; 1916 John Keppie redecorated the saloon.	32713	Upload another image
Tolbooth Steeple	Glasgow Cross	6 July 1966	55°51′24″N 4°14′37″W	Built 1626-1634 by John Boyd, architect and Master of Works. The Tolbooth was demolished in 1921.	32717	Upload another image See more images
177 Ingram Street with 99 Glassford Street		15 December 1970	55°51′35″N 4°14′56″W	John Burnet, 1865-66. Sculpture by George Frampton.	32734	Upload another image
Lanarkshire House, Corinthian Club (Former Sheriff Court and Justice of Peace Court)	191 Ingram Street	15 December 1970	55°51′34″N 4°14′59″W	David Hamilton in 1841 with alterations and additions including a telling room by James Salmon Sr in 1853. It was refronted and additions made by John Burnet Senior in 1876-9.	32735	Upload another image See more images
Ramshorn Theatre	98 Ingram Street	15 December 1970	55°51′35″N 4°14′42″W	Thomas Rickman, 1824-1826; Page and Park, conversion to theatre c1990-92. Formerly St Paul's and St David's Church, Church of Scotland	32740	Upload another image See more images
Hutchesons' Hall	158 Ingram Street, and 2 John Street	6 November 1966	55°51′36″N 4°14′51″W	David Hamilton, 1802-1805, interior by John Baird II 1876.	32744	Upload another image See more images
16 McPhater Street, and return elevation to Dunblane Street (Ozalid's)		15 December 1970	55°52′02″N 4°15′19″W	William James Anderson, 1892-95.	32754	Upload another image
61-63 (Odd Nos) Miller Street		15 December 1970	55°51′33″N 4°15′05″W	J Burnet Sr, 1854 with alterations by J Burnet and Son, 1900 and 1901.	32758	Upload another image
Arthur's Warehouse	77-81 (Odd Nos) Miller Street	6 November 1966	55°51′34″N 4°15′04″W	Robert Black and James Salmon Sr, 1849-50.	32759	Upload another image
42 Miller Street		15 December 1970	55°51′31″N 4°15′03″W	John Craig, wright, 1775; restored by McGurn, Logan, Duncan & Opfer, 1994-5.	32760	Upload another image
Formerly Stirling's Library	48-54 (Even Nos) Miller Street	15 December 1970	55°51′32″N 4°15′03″W	James Smith, 1863-5, completed after his death by Melvin and Leiper.	32761	Upload another image
Tron Steeple	71 Trongate	6 July 1966	55°51′25″N 4°14′44″W	1630-36. Tower pierced at ground by Tudor arches in 1855 by John Carrick.	32769	Upload another image See more images
Britannia Music Hall	109-121 (Odd Nos) Trongate and 9 New Wynd	22 March 1977	55°51′25″N 4°14′49″W	Gildard & MacFarlane architects, dated 1857 on frieze; rear staircase, 1869, by Hugh Barclay; further alterations to cinema usage 1904-10 by Boswell & McIntyre.	32774	Upload another image See more images
60-90 (Even Nos) Trongate and 19-29 (Odd Nos) Albion Street		15 December 1970	55°51′26″N 4°14′45″W	J T Rochead, 1854.	32782	Upload another image
190 Trongate and 2-4 (Even Nos) Glassford Street		15 December 1970	55°51′27″N 4°14′56″W	T P Marwick architect with W Birnie Rhind sculptor 1903.	32789	Upload another image
St Andrew's-by-the-Green	33 Turnbull Street	6 July 1966	55°51′15″N 4°14′39″W	Andrew Hunter and William Paull, joint master masons; Thomas Thomson, wright; built 1750-1.	32790	Upload another image See more images
37-47 (Odd Nos) Virginia Street		15 December 1970	55°51′32″N 4°15′01″W	Circa 1817.	32795	Upload another image
49-53 (Odd Nos) Virginia Street		15 December 1970	55°51′32″N 4°15′00″W	Circa 1817. Designed in unison with Nos 37-49 Virginia Street, known as Virginia Buildings; surviving examples of commercial street architecture in the Merchant City.	32796	Upload another image
42 Virginia Street		15 December 1970	55°51′31″N 4°14′59″W	R G Melvin and W Leiper, 1867.	32798	Upload another image
Tron Theatre	38 Parnie Street	15 December 1970	55°51′24″N 4°14′45″W	James Adam, 1793-4. To the East wall a Baroque screen wall and gateway were added forming a courtyard, J J Burnet, 1899-1900. In 1981 the former Church was converted into a theatre by McGurn, Logan and Duncan. Former Tron Kirk	32812	Upload another image See more images
Gallery of Modern Art	111 Queen Street and 46-58 (Even Nos) Royal Exchange Square	6 July 1966	55°51′36″N 4°15′09″W	David Hamilton, 1827-30, with 2nd E attic by Hamilton, 1880. Sculpture by James Fillans. Former Stirling's Library, Former Cunninghame Mansion and Former Royal Exchange	32818	Upload another image See more images
St George's Buildings	151-157 (Odd Nos) Queen Street	6 July 1966	55°51′38″N 4°15′08″W	David Hamilton, circa 1834.	32819	Upload another image
Queen Street station	Cathedral Street	15 December 1970	55°51′45″N 4°15′04″W	James Carswell, 1878-80, executed by P and W MacLellan.	32822	Upload another image See more images
Duke of Wellington Statue	Queen Street	15 December 1970	55°51′36″N 4°15′07″W	Baron Carlo Marochetti, 1844.	32823	Upload another image See more images
Barony Hall, University of Strathclyde	Cathedral Square	6 July 1966	55°51′43″N 4°14′14″W	Sir John James Burnet and John Archibald Campbell, 1886-90; David Leslie of Walter Underwood and Partners followed by David Leslie Partnership restored with additions, 1986-95. Former Barony Church and Church Hall. Listing includes War Memorial, retaining wall, railings and gatepiers	32824	Upload another image See more images
1-29 (Odd Nos) and 2-40 (Even Nos) Royal Exchange Square with 145-147 (Odd Nos) Queen Street and Archways		15 December 1970	55°51′38″N 4°15′08″W	Nos 1-29 at S, David Hamilton and Robert Black, 1830, and Nos 2-40 at N, Hamilton and James Smith, based on scheme by Archibald Elliot II.	32826	Upload another image
Royal Bank of Scotland (Glasgow)	Royal Exchange Square	6 July 1966	55°51′37″N 4°15′13″W	Archibald Elliot, 1827.	32827	Upload another image
Blochairn Parish Church (Church of Scotland)	178 Roystonhill, Royston	3 September 1974	55°52′05″N 4°13′38″W	Campbell Douglas and Stevenson, architects, 1865-6, interior and stained glass by Morris and Co.	32828	Upload another image See more images
St Andrew's in the Square	St Andrews Square	6 July 1966	55°51′17″N 4°14′34″W	Alan Dreghorn, 1739-1756. Gibbsesque Palladian modelled after St Martin-in-the-Fields.	32830	Upload another image See more images
St Enoch Square Travel Centre	St Enoch Square	15 December 1970	55°51′27″N 4°15′19″W	James Miller, 1896. Formerly St Enoch Underground Station.	32833	Upload another image See more images
Scottish Provident Institution	17-29 (Odd Nos) St Vincent Place	15 December 1970	55°51′39″N 4°15′10″W	J M Dick Peddie, 1904-8.	32836	Upload another image
2 St Vincent Place and 2 and 4 Anchor Lane		6 July 1966	55°51′40″N 4°15′07″W	J T Rochead, 1867-70. Sculpture by William Mossman.	32838	Upload another image
Anchor Building	12-16 (Even Nos) St Vincent Place	15 December 1970	55°51′41″N 4°15′08″W	James Miller, 1906-7.	32839	Upload another image
Citizen Building	24 St Vincent Place	15 December 1970	55°51′41″N 4°15′10″W	T L Watson, 1885-9.	32840	Upload another image
30 St Vincent Place		15 December 1970	55°51′41″N 4°15′11″W	John Burnet Sr, 1870-73.	32841	Upload another image
Justiciary Courts	212 Saltmarket	15 December 1970	55°51′13″N 4°14′49″W	Portico by William Stark, 1807-1814; main building to Saltmarket J H Craigie of Clarke and Bell and J H Craigie reconstruction of 1910-1913.	32844	Upload another image See more images
1-16 (inclusive Nos) Buckingham Terrace, 2, 4 Buckingham Street, 1, 3 Ruskin Place	Great Western Road	15 December 1970	55°52′38″N 4°17′13″W	J T Rochead, 1852-54.	32850	Upload another image
Lilybank House	University of Glasgow, Gilmorehill Campus	15 December 1970	55°52′26″N 4°17′25″W	In the style of David Hamilton, built around 1850 and altered by A & G Thomson (1863-65) and Honeyman, Keppie & Mackintosh (1894-95; 1900 and 1908).	32853	Upload another image
35-51 (Odd Nos) Hamilton Drive, (1-9 Inclusive Nos) Northpark Terrace	Kelvinside	15 December 1970	55°52′39″N 4°17′09″W	Alexander Thomson, circa 1869.	32874	Upload another image
Cottier Theatre Complex	93-95 (Odd Nos) Hyndland Street	15 December 1970	55°52′27″N 4°18′07″W	William Leiper 1865-66. Former Dowanhill Church and Halls.	32879	Upload another image See more images
Woodbank [de	56 Partickhill Road	15 December 1970	55°52′28″N 4°18′31″W	Circa 1841.	32895	Upload another image
1-9 (Inclusive Nos) Ruskin Terrace, 1, 1A, 3 Hamilton Park Avenue		15 December 1970	55°52′35″N 4°17′01″W	Circa 1855-58.	32903	Upload another image
Wellington Church	76 University Avenue	6 July 1966	55°52′21″N 4°17′13″W	T L Watson, 1882-84.	32912	Upload another image See more images
Gilbert Scott Building and Memorial Chapel (with the Lion and Unicorn Staircase)	University of Glasgow, Gilmorehill Campus	15 December 1970	55°52′19″N 4°17′20″W	Sir George Gilbert Scott (N, S and E elevations), 1867-1870; tower and spire finished 1891 by John Oldrid Scott. Later made into 2 quadrangles with the addition of Bute and Randolph Halls, designed by Sir George Gilbert Scott and executed by his son, John Oldrid Scott, and Edwin Morgan, 1878-84. West Quadrangle Sir John James Burnet, 1923-29. Lion and Unicorn Staircase, William Riddell, 1690	32913	Upload another image See more images
Joseph Black Building	University of Glasgow, Gilmorehill Campus	15 January 1985	55°52′19″N 4°17′36″W	T Harold Hughes with D S R Waugh, 1936-9.	32918	Upload another image
Pearce Lodge	University of Glasgow, Gilmorehill Campus	15 December 1970	55°52′19″N 4°17′09″W	A G Thomson, Architect & Civil Engineer, 1887. Incorporates decorative mid 17th-century sculptural fragments from demolished Old College (High Street) into exterior.	32925	Upload another image
McMillan Reading Room	University of Glasgow, Gilmorehill Campus	15 January 1985	55°52′22″N 4°17′17″W	T Harold Hughes and D S R Waugh, 1936-39.	32927	Upload another image
Graham Kerr Building	University of Glasgow, Gilmorehill Campus	15 December 1970	55°52′17″N 4°17′35″W	Sir John James Burnet, 1923-27	32928	Upload another image
2-10 (inclusive) University Gardens	University of Glasgow, Gilmorehill Campus	15 December 1970	55°52′23″N 4°17′25″W	John James Burnet, 1882-96.	32931	Upload another image
Salmon House (12 University Gardens)	University of Glasgow, Gilmorehill Campus	15 December 1970	55°52′23″N 4°17′26″W	J Gaff Gillespie, 1900.	32932	Upload another image
14 University Gardens	University of Glasgow, Gilmorehill Campus	15 December 1970	55°52′24″N 4°17′27″W	John James Burnet, 1904.	32933	Upload another image
The Salon [de	17 Vinicombe Street	22 March 1977	55°52′37″N 4°17′26″W	Brand and Lithgow, 1913; altered 1931 by James McKissack and 1940 by Burnet and Boston, converted to Salon restaurant 2007.	32934	Upload another image
Former Botanic Gardens Garage	24 Vinicombe Street	6 February 1989	55°52′38″N 4°17′24″W	D V Wyllie, circa 1906-12.	32935	Upload another image See more images
Savings Bank of Glasgow	752-756 (Even Nos) Argyle Street and 3, 5, 7 Shaftesbury Street	15 December 1970	55°51′42″N 4°16′27″W	James Salmon junior and J Gaff Gillespie, 1899-1900, sculpture by Albert Hodge.	32953	Upload another image
181-199 (Odd Nos) Bath Street and Blythswood Street		15 December 1970	55°51′52″N 4°15′47″W	Probably John Baird I, begun 1833; with later block by Andrew Robertson, 1930-2. Includes the Glasgow Art Club	32960	Upload another image
King's Theatre	335 Bath Street and Elmbank Street	15 December 1970	55°51′54″N 4°16′07″W	Frank Matcham, 1903-04.	32963	Upload another image See more images
Mercantile Chambers	39-69 (Odd Nos) Bothwell Street	15 December 1970	55°51′40″N 4°15′40″W	James Salmon junior, 1897-8. Sculptor Derwent Wood.	32980	Upload another image
2-28 (Even Nos) Bothwell Street, 123 Hope Street		24 July 1973	55°51′40″N 4°15′32″W	Alexander Kirkland and John Bryce, 1849. The western pavilion was replaced by the National Commercial Bank, H E Clifford 1892.	32983	Upload another image
21-31 (Odd Nos) (Known As 21) Buchanan Street and 8-28 (Even Nos) Mitchell Street		15 December 1970	55°51′31″N 4°15′20″W	William Spence, circa 1879.	32991	Upload another image
Former Wylie and Lochead's	45 Buchanan Street and 34-50 (Even Nos) Mitchell Street	23 March 1977	55°51′33″N 4°15′19″W	South section of Buchanan Street frontage 1853-4. Central section James Sellars 1884. North section Boucher and Cousland after 1883.	32992	Upload another image
91 Buchanan Street		15 December 1970	55°51′36″N 4°15′17″W	Sir George Washington Browne, 1896.	32998	Upload another image
113-115 (Odd Nos) Buchanan Street and 4 Gordon Street		15 December 1970	55°51′38″N 4°15′16″W	A G Sydney Mitchell, 1887.	33000	Upload another image
Former Western Club	147 Buchanan Street and St Vincent Street	15 December 1970	55°51′41″N 4°15′15″W	D and J Hamilton with the assistance of J T Rochead, 1841.	33002	Upload another image See more images
St George's Tron Parish Church	163 Buchanan Street	6 July 1966	55°51′43″N 4°15′14″W	William Stark, 1807. Church of Scotland.	33003	Upload another image See more images
Former Athenaeum Theatre	179 Buchanan Street	6 July 1966	55°51′45″N 4°15′14″W	Sir J J Burnet and J A Campbell, 1891-3.	33004	Upload another image
No 4 Clairmont Gardens		15 December 1970	55°52′00″N 4°16′38″W	Previously included in listing of nos 2-13 Clairmont Gardens. Up-graded B to A 28 September 1994 and included as a separate item due to high quality of interior work.	33008	Upload another image
Former Custom House	298-306 (Even Nos) Clyde Street	15 December 1970	55°51′23″N 4°15′24″W	John Taylor, 1840. Now Office of Procurator Fiscal.	33012	Upload another image
49 Derby Street, 22, 30 Bentinck Street		6 July 1966	55°52′00″N 4°17′05″W	James Sellars, 1879-80.	33015	Upload another image
17-21 (Odd Nos) Drury Street	Including "The Horse Shoe Bar"	21 July 1988	55°51′39″N 4°15′23″W	Circa 1870, interior remodelled 1885-87 and 1901. Unknown architect, after Alexander Thomson.	33016	Upload another image
120 Elmbank Street with 71-83 (Odd Nos) Holland Street and Lodges, 59, 61 Holland Street		15 December 1970	55°51′51″N 4°16′04″W	Main block, Charles Wilson, 1846. Sculptures by John Mossman. 71-83 Holland St: J L Cowan, completed 1897. Science Block: John Watson 1931-32. Lodges, Holland St: Watson, Salmond and Gray, 1938.	33022	Upload another image
Central Station & Hotel	Gordon Street	15 December 1970	55°51′35″N 4°15′31″W	Sir R Rowand Anderson, 1883-4. Extensive additions to Hope Street, James Miller 1900-1907.	33029	Upload another image See more images
6 Gordon Street, Part of Former Commercial Bank		6 July 1966	55°51′38″N 4°15′18″W	David Rhind, 1854-7.	33030	Upload another image
20-40 (Even Nos) Gordon Street and 1, 3 West Nile Street		15 December 1970	55°51′38″N 4°15′22″W	Peddie and Kinnear, 1873.	33031	Upload another image
Grosvenor Building	72-80 (Even Nos) Gordon Street	15 December 1970	55°51′39″N 4°15′28″W	Alexander Thomson, 1864, with later additional storeys by J H Craigie, 1902-07.	33034	Upload another image
Mitchell Theatre	Granville Street, Berkeley Street and Kent Road	6 July 1966	55°51′53″N 4°16′24″W	James Sellars, 1873-77, interior reconstructed. Sculpture by John Mossman at 1st floor. William Mossman at ground floor. Formerly St Andrew's Halls.	33036	Upload another image
Breadalbane Terrace	97-113B (Odd Nos) Hill Street	15 December 1970	55°52′01″N 4°15′56″W	Possibly Charles Wilson. Built in 2 sections 1845-6 and 1855-6.	33038	Upload another image
Hill Street Synagogue	129 Hill Street and 29 Garnet Street	27 November 1979	55°52′02″N 4°16′04″W	John McLeod, in association with N.S. Joseph, 1877-79.	33040	Upload another image See more images
Peel Terrace	102-112 (Even Nos) Hill Street, and 37, 39 Garnethill Street	11 May 1981	55°52′03″N 4°15′57″W	1841-2. Possibly David Hamilton.	33044	Upload another image
Atlantic Chambers	43, 45, 47 Hope Street and 1A Cadogan Street	15 December 1970	55°51′34″N 4°15′34″W	Sir J J Burnet, 1899.	33050	Upload another image
Central Chambers [de	91-115 (Odd Nos) Hope Street, 2-14 (Even Nos) Waterloo Street and 1-13 (Odd Nos) Bothwell Street	15 December 1970	55°51′38″N 4°15′34″W	Peddie and Kinnear, 1876-77.	33052	Upload another image
157-167 (Odd Nos) Hope Street and 169-175 (Odd Nos) West George Street		6 July 1966	55°51′44″N 4°15′31″W	John A Campbell, 1902.	33053	Upload another image
106, 108, 110 Hope Street (Known As 108)		15 December 1979	55°51′40″N 4°15′30″W	W Forrest Salmon, 1894 assisted by J Gaff Gillespie and James Salmon, sculpture by W Ferris.	33056	Upload another image
Lion Chambers	170, 172 Hope Street	6 July 1966	55°51′49″N 4°15′26″W	James Salmon Jr., 1905.	33059	Upload another image See more images
Theatre Royal	282 Hope Street, Cowcaddens	22 March 1977	55°51′59″N 4°15′22″W	George Bell, 1867; burnt down 1879, restoration after fire by Charles J Phipps, 1880. Further fire, also rebuilt by Phipps, 1895, in similar scheme to previous one; altered James Miller 1901; restored and new foyer Derek Sugden of Arup Associates 1974-5.	33061	Upload another image See more images
Gardner's Warehouse	36 Jamaica Street and 10 Midland Street	6 July 1966	55°51′27″N 4°15′27″W	John Baird I and R McConnel iron founder, 1855-56. Early example of Iron Frame architecture.	33065	Upload another image
Atlantic Apartments	69 James Watt Street	15 December 1970	55°51′30″N 4°15′51″W	Circa 1855.	33068	Upload another image
44-54 James Watt Street		15 December 1970	55°51′30″N 4°15′50″W	Circa 1863.	33069	Upload another image
66-72 James Watt Street		15 December 1970	55°51′30″N 4°15′50″W	Probably J Stephen 1847-8.	33070	Upload another image
Kelvingrove Art Gallery and Museum	Kelvingrove Park	15 December 1970	55°52′07″N 4°17′26″W	J W Simpson and Milner Allen, 1892 by competition, completed 1901; sculpture supervised and partly executed by George Frampton, other sculptors involved, W Birnie Rhind, E G Bramwell, Johann Keller, A McF Shannon, F Derwent Wood, A Falkner.	33071	Upload another image See more images
Hindu Mandir	1 La Belle Place	6 July 1966	55°52′00″N 4°16′45″W	Charles Wilson, 1857. Former Queen's Rooms.	33082	Upload another image
2-5 La Belle Place		15 December 1970	55°52′00″N 4°16′47″W	Charles Wilson, 1857.	33083	Upload another image
Former Glasgow Herald Building	60-76 (Even Nos) Mitchell Street	15 December 1970	55°51′35″N 4°15′20″W	John Keppie and Charles Rennie Mackintosh, 1893-5.	33087	Upload another image See more images
Glasgow Stock Exchange	63-77 (Odd Nos) Nelson Mandela Place, West George Street with 153-159 (Odd Nos) Buchanan Street	15 December 1970	55°51′42″N 4°15′15″W	John Burnet 1875-7; Sir J J Burnet western addition 1894-8 and 1904, re-cast behind the facade.	33089	Upload another image See more images
Former Daily Record Building	20, 26, 28 Renfield Lane and St Vincent Lane	15 December 1970	55°51′40″N 4°15′28″W	Charles Rennie Mackintosh, 1900-01 and 1903-04.	33099	Upload another image
Pavilion Theatre	121-125 Renfield Street	22 March 1977	55°51′54″N 4°15′21″W	Bertie Crewe, 1902-4.	33103	Upload another image See more images
Glasgow School of Art	167 Renfrew Street and 11, 15 Dalhousie Street	6 July 1966	55°51′58″N 4°15′49″W	Charles Rennie Mackintosh, Eastern section, 1897. Western section, 1907-9.	33105	Upload another image See more images
71-75 Robertson Street and 58, 60 Robertson Lane		15 December 1970	55°51′30″N 4°15′42″W	J A Campbell 1901.	33112	Upload another image
Clyde Navigation Trust	16 Robertson Street	6 July 1966	55°51′25″N 4°15′39″W	Sir J J Burnet. 1883-6 North section. 1905-8 corner with Broomielaw. Sculpture by Albert Hodge.	33113	Upload another image See more images
St Aloysius' Church (Roman Catholic)	23, 25 Rose Street	15 December 1970	55°51′59″N 4°15′42″W	C J Menart, 1908-10.	33115	Upload another image See more images
Charing Cross Mansions	2-30 (Even Nos) St George's Road, 540-546 (Even Nos) Sauchiehall Street and 357,359 Renfrew Street	15 December 1970	55°52′00″N 4°16′14″W	Sir J J Burnet, 1891.	33127	Upload another image See more images
19-30 St Vincent Crescent (Excluding Nos 23, 23A, 23B, 26A) and 21 Corunna Street		15 December 1970	55°51′48″N 4°17′00″W	Alexander Kirkland, circa 1855.	33128	Upload another image
31-70 St Vincent Crescent (Excluding Nos 35A,36A,37A,39A) and 30 Corunna Street		15 December 1970	55°51′51″N 4°17′20″W	Alexander Kirkland, 1850 onwards.	33129	Upload another image
115-117 St Vincent Street		15 December 1970	55°51′41″N 4°15′28″W	John Burnet Sr, 1870.	33138	Upload another image
St Vincent Street Church	261 St Vincent Street	6 July 1966	55°51′44″N 4°15′56″W	Alexander Thomson, 1857-59. Former United Free Church of Scotland, now Free Church.	33150	Upload another image See more images
84-94 St Vincent Street		15 December 1970	55°51′42″N 4°15′21″W	John A Campbell 1908-9.	33153	Upload another image
Bank of Scotland (110-120 St Vincent Street)	110, 120 St Vincent Street and 29-37 (Odd Nos) Renfield Street and West George Lane	15 December 1970	55°51′43″N 4°15′26″W	James Miller, 1925-27.	33156	Upload another image
Royal Bank Building [de	140, 142 St Vincent Street and 153, 155 Hope Street	21 July 1988	55°51′43″N 4°15′31″W	Burnet and Boston, circa 1900.	33159	Upload another image
142a-144 St Vincent Street	The "Hatrack"	6 July 1966	55°51′43″N 4°15′31″W	James Salmon Jnr, 1899-1902.	33160	Upload another image
200 St Vincent Street		6 July 1966	55°51′44″N 4°15′39″W	Sir J J Burnet, 1926-9, major internal remodelling 1986/7.	33162	Upload another image
Willow Tearooms	217 Sauchiehall Street	15 December 1970	55°51′54″N 4°15′40″W	Designed by Charles Rennie Mackintosh and Margaret Macdonald in 1903.	33173	Upload another image See more images
901-903 Sauchiehall Street		15 December 1970	55°51′55″N 4°17′05″W	Charles Wilson, 1853.	33184	Upload another image
336-356 (Even Nos) Sauchiehall Street and 1 Scott Street		15 December 1970	55°51′57″N 4°15′54″W	Alexander Thomson, 1865.	33193	Upload another image See more images
Albany Chambers	528-538 (Even Nos) Sauchiehall Street	15 December 1970	55°51′59″N 4°16′12″W	Sir J J Burnet, 1896-7.	33199	Upload another image
The Egyptian Halls	84-100 Union Street	6 July 1966	55°51′35″N 4°15′24″W	Alexander Thomson, 1871-3.	33208	Upload another image See more images
Ca d'Oro Building	122-136 (Even Nos) Union Street and 41-55 (Odd Nos) Gordon Street and Union Place	15 December 1970	55°51′37″N 4°15′24″W	John Honeyman, 1872.	33209	Upload another image See more images
Former Waterloo Street Post Office, Parcels Office	50 Waterloo Street with 81 Wellington Street	15 December 1970	55°51′38″N 4°15′40″W	W T Oldrieve (for the Office of Works), 1903-05.	33214	Upload another image
Former Sun Life Building	117, 121 West George Street and 38-42 (Even Nos) Renfield Street	15 December 1970	55°51′43″N 4°15′22″W	William Leiper, 1889-94.	33223	Upload another image
4 Nelson Mandela Place		15 December 1970	55°51′44″N 4°15′13″W	A N Paterson, 1908-10.	33233	Upload another image
Former Athenaeum de	8 Nelson Mandela Place	6 July 1966	55°51′45″N 4°15′15″W	Sir J J Burnet, 1886.	33234	Upload another image
Royal Faculty of Procurators	68 West George Street, 12 Nelson Mandela Place	6 July 1966	55°51′44″N 4°15′17″W	Charles Wilson, 1854.	33235	Upload another image See more images
Cornhill House	144, 146 West George Street	15 December 1970	55°51′46″N 4°15′26″W	James Sellars, 1879 with sculpture by William Mossman.	33241	Upload another image
196-198 West George Street and 118 Wellington Street		15 December 1970	55°51′46″N 4°15′33″W	Circa 1830. Probably by John Brash.	33246	Upload another image
Finnieston Crane	Stobcross Quay	14 April 1989	55°51′30″N 4°17′04″W	1926, completed 1931 by Cowans Sheldon and Co Ltd under the supervision of Daniel Fife Mechanical Engineer to the Clyde Navigation Trust.	33285	Upload another image See more images
140-142 Balgrayhill Road, including Redclyffe		22 March 1977	55°53′18″N 4°13′49″W	Charles Rennie Mackintosh, 1890, for his cousin James Hamilton.	33288	Upload another image
Springburn Winter Gardens	Springburn Park	22 March 1985	55°53′20″N 4°13′37″W	Simpson and Farmer, hothouse builders, with William Baird of Temple ironworks, 1899-1900.	33298	Upload another image See more images
Elder Cottage Hospital	1A Drumoyne Drive and Langlands Road	15 December 1970	55°51′38″N 4°19′40″W	Sir John James Burnet, 1902.	33300	Upload another image
Statue of Mrs John Elder	Elder Park	15 December 1970	55°51′41″N 4°19′32″W	By Archibald McFarlane Shannan, RSA.	33304	Upload another image See more images
Elder Park Library	228A Langlands Road and Elder Park Street	15 December 1970	55°51′43″N 4°19′19″W	Sir John James Burnet, 1902-3.	33310	Upload another image
Govan Graving Docks	18 Clydebrae Street	15 May 1987	55°51′39″N 4°18′03″W	No 1 Dock (at North): by James Deas and Alex Lister, 1869-75. No 2 Dock (Centre): by James Deas, 1883-6. No 3 Dock (South): by James Deas, 1894-8.	33336	Upload another image See more images
Former British Linen Bank	816, 818 Govan Road, 1, 3 Water Row	15 December 1970	55°51′48″N 4°18′42″W	James Salmon and Son, and J G Gillespie, 1899.	33351	Upload another image See more images
Pearce Institute	840, 860 Govan Road	6 July 1966	55°51′49″N 4°18′46″W	Sir R Rowand Anderson, designed 1892, built 1902-5.	33352	Upload another image
Govan Old Parish Church	866, 868 Govan Road	6 July 1966	55°51′53″N 4°18′47″W	Sir R Rowand Anderson 1883-8, chancel lengthened 1906 and dedicated in 1908.	33353	Upload another image See more images
Govan Shipbuilders Ltd, General Offices	1030, 1048 Govan Road	15 December 1970	55°51′56″N 4°19′25″W	Honeyman and Keppie, 1890. Listing excludes the 1956 extension to the west.	33356	Upload another image See more images
Govan Shipbuilders' Store, Former Engine Works of Fairfield Shipbuilding and Engineering Company	1048 Govan Road	15 May 1987	55°51′56″N 4°19′25″W	Angus Kennedy: 1st drawings December 1868, working details summer 1869, completed 1871, in full production 1874.	33357	Upload Photo
Former Prince's Dock Hydraulic Power Station	1 Pacific Quay	15 December 1970	55°51′25″N 4°17′15″W	Burnet, Son and Campbell, 1894.	33360	Upload another image
The Knowe	301 Albert Drive	15 December 1970	55°50′34″N 4°16′37″W	Alexander Thomson, begun circa 1852.	33371	Upload another image
Miller and Lang Building	50 Darnley Street, Pollokshields	22 March 1977	55°50′35″N 4°16′10″W	D B Dobson, 1902. Category A for the fine and exceptionally complete art nouveau office interiors on 1st floor.	33402	Upload another image
Pollokshields Burgh Hall	70 and 72 Glencairn Drive	15 December 1970	55°50′19″N 4°17′15″W	H E Clifford, 1888-90 with additions and alterations by Thomas Somers, Office of Public Works, 1935.	33411	Upload another image See more images
Ellisland	200 Nithsdale Road	15 December 1970	55°50′32″N 4°17′11″W	Alexander Thomson, 1871.	33450	Upload Photo
Castlehill (Glasgow)	202 Nithsdale Road	15 December 1970	55°50′32″N 4°17′13″W	Alexander Thomson, 1870.	33451	Upload Photo
Pollok House	2060 Pollokshaws Road	6 July 1966	55°49′39″N 4°19′04″W	Possibly Allan Dreghorn. Dated 1752.	33455	Upload another image See more images
Bridge over White Cart Water at Pollok House	2060 Pollokshaws Road	6 July 1966	55°49′37″N 4°19′05″W	Built 1757-8.	33456	Upload another image See more images
Stables of Pollok House	2060 Pollokshaws Road	6 July 1966	55°49′35″N 4°18′59″W	Mainly 17th-19th century; formerly stables to Pollok house, but at site of previous house (the Laighe Castle) and containing much re-used 17th century work. Fragments at E corner said to be of c. 1536 tower.	33457	Upload another image
Benefrey	124 Springkell Avenue	15 December 1970	55°50′21″N 4°18′17″W	W Hunter McNab, 1910.	33486	Upload another image
Former Caledonia Road Church	1 Caledonia Road	6 July 1966	55°50′50″N 4°15′17″W	Alexander Thomson, 1856.	33497	Upload another image See more images
40-61 (Inclusive) Carlton Place and 16 Nicholson Street		15 December 1970	55°51′13″N 4°15′19″W	Peter Nicholson, 1802-4. No 50-53, Laurieston House has exceptional plaster work with columns, pilasters, swags and cherubs in vestibule and stair well.	33499	Upload another image See more images
Former Eglinton Engine Works	27-117 (Odd Nos) Cook Street (Westbridge Gardens) and 181 and 183 West Street	17 June 1986	55°51′03″N 4°15′54″W	Built from circa 1855.	33504	Upload another image
162-170 Gorbals Street		15 December 1970	55°51′00″N 4°15′16″W	James Salmon, Jr. 1900. Former British Linen Bank, shop and flats with Glasgow style detailing.	33513	Upload another image
Scotland Street School	225 Scotland Street	6 July 1966	55°50′58″N 4°16′25″W	Charles Rennie Mackintosh between 1903 and 1907.	33534	Upload another image See more images
Craigie Hall	6 Rowan Road, Dumbreck	27 April 1978	55°50′49″N 4°18′32″W	John Honeyman, 1872. Added to during the 1890s by his architectural partners John Keppie and Charles Rennie Mackintosh.	33583	Upload another image
Leverndale Hospital, Towerview Unit	510 Crookston Road	15 December 1970	55°50′04″N 4°22′14″W	Malcolm Stark and Rowntree, 1890-5. Additions by D Barclay, 1903.	33597	Upload another image See more images
Former Springburn College	110-136 (Even Nos) Flemington Street	29 January 1990	55°52′47″N 4°13′50″W	James Miller, 1903-9.	33612	Upload another image
Tollcross House	591 Tollcross Road	15 December 1970	55°50′47″N 4°10′47″W	David Bryce, 1848.	33648	Upload another image
Daldowie Dovecot	Hamilton Road	12 January 1971	55°50′27″N 4°07′45″W	Mid 18th century cylindrical dovecot.	33668	Upload another image See more images
Southern Necropolis Lodge	316 Caledonia Road, Rutherglen Road	15 December 1970	55°50′38″N 4°14′43″W	Charles Wilson, 1848. The main cemetery is Category B.	33685	Upload another image See more images
St Francis Church and Presbytery	405, 407 Cumberland Street	15 December 1970	55°50′47″N 4°14′45″W	Gilbert Blount, 1868; rebuilt by Pugin & Pugin 1878-81, chancel and chapels completed 1895.	33690	Upload another image See more images
St Andrews Suspension Bridge	Adelphi Street/Glasgow Green	23 March 1992	55°50′56″N 4°14′18″W	Neil Robson and Charles O'Neill, 1853-5.	33692	Upload another image See more images
Sentinel Works	61 Jessie Street, Polmadie	13 May 1991	55°50′07″N 4°14′32″W	Archibald Leitch, engineer with Brand and Lithgow, architects, 1903-1904. Earliest reinforced concrete (ferro concrete) building in Scotland.	33693	Upload another image
Aikenhead House	325 Carmunnock Road, King's Park	15 December 1970	55°48′55″N 4°14′30″W	1806, 1823 flanking wings and alterations all probably by David Hamilton.	33708	Upload another image See more images
Ruchill Hospital, Water Tower	520 Bilsland Drive	6 April 1992	55°53′13″N 4°15′57″W	Alexander Beith McDonald, 1892.	33750	Upload another image See more images
Kelvin Stevenson Memorial Church	62 Belmont Street, 93 and 99 Garriochmill Road	15 December 1970	55°52′38″N 4°16′44″W	John James Stevenson, 1898-1902. Church of Scotland.	33753	Upload another image See more images
Queens Cross Church and Hall	870 Garscube Road	6 July 1966	55°52′49″N 4°16′19″W	Charles Rennie Mackintosh, 1896-99.	33764	Upload another image See more images
St Columba of Iona Roman Catholic Church and Presbytery	74 and 76 Hopehill Road	6 April 1992	55°52′35″N 4°16′00″W	1937, Gillespie, Kidd & Coia.	33765	Upload another image See more images
Former St George's In the Fields	485 St George's Road	6 July 1966	55°52′27″N 4°15′50″W	1885-6. H and D Barclay.	33782	Upload another image See more images
St Mary's Roman Catholic Church	99 Abercromby Street	16 March 1993	55°51′14″N 4°13′37″W	Goldie and Child, 1841-2.	33810	Upload another image See more images
105-169 Bell Street		22 March 1977	55°51′27″N 4°14′31″W	Built 1882.	33814	Upload another image
Shelter (Bridgeton Umbrella)	Bridgeton Cross	16 March 1993	55°50′56″N 4°13′35″W	1874.	33818	Upload another image
Alexander's School	94 Duke Street	15 December 1970	55°51′34″N 4°14′08″W	John Burnet Sr., 1858. Previously used as an annex by St Mungo's Academy. Currently housing small businesses.	33827	Upload another image See more images
The Doulton Fountain	Glasgow Green	15 December 1970	55°51′06″N 4°14′10″W	A E Pearce, 1888.	33836	Upload another image See more images
Nelson Monument	Glasgow Green	15 December 1970	55°51′05″N 4°14′27″W	David Hamilton, 1806.	33837	Upload another image See more images
People's Palace	Glasgow Green	15 December 1970	55°51′04″N 4°14′15″W	A B MacDonald, City Engineer, 1894-8.	33838	Upload another image See more images
Mercat Building	15-23 (Odd Nos) London Road and 26 Gallowgate	15 December 1970	55°51′23″N 4°14′35″W	A Graham Henderson, 1928-1933.	33851	Upload another image
Sacred Heart Church	50-56 (Even Nos) Old Dalmarnock Road	15 December 1970	55°50′46″N 4°13′24″W	C J Menart, 1909-10; Presbytery, 1890 by Pugin & Pugin; later alterations by Gillespie, Kidd & Coia, 1953-4 including fresco restoration by William Crosbie.	33855	Upload another image See more images
Templeton Carpet Factory	62 Templeton Street	6 July 1966	55°51′01″N 4°13′58″W	William Leiper, 1889.	33857	Upload another image See more images
Provan Hall	Auchinlea Park, Easterhouse	15 December 1970	55°52′18″N 4°07′52″W	House possibly of late medieval origin, retaining a significant amount of early fabric.	33863	Upload another image See more images
Gartloch Hospital	Gartloch Road	14 June 1991	55°52′46″N 4°06′21″W	Thomson and Sandilands, 1889.	33868	Upload another image See more images
Walmer Crescent	Cessnock	6 July 1966	55°51′07″N 4°17′48″W	Alexander Thomson, 1857-62.	33876	Upload another image See more images
St Andrew's East Church	681 Alexandra Parade and 6 Easter Craigs	15 December 1970	55°51′47″N 4°12′31″W	James Miller, 1903.	33879	Upload another image See more images
Cast-iron Fountain (Saracen Fountain)	Alexandra Park	17 June 1992	55°51′52″N 4°12′30″W	Walter Macfarlane & Co, Saracen Foundry, originally for 1901 Glasgow Empire Exhibition.	33880	Upload another image See more images
The Necropolis	Cathedral Square	15 December 1970	55°51′46″N 4°13′51″W	Opened May 1833.	33890	Upload another image See more images
Our Lady of Good Counsel Church	73 Craigpark	23 September 1994	55°51′45″N 4°13′21″W	1964-5, Gillespie, Kidd & Coia.	33891	Upload another image See more images
176 Duke Street, Kirkhaven		15 December 1970	55°51′32″N 4°13′48″W	Peddie and Kinnear, 1857-8.	33899	Upload another image
St Anne's Church and Presbytery	17-23 (Odd Nos) Whitevale Street	27 November 1979	55°51′27″N 4°12′58″W	Jack Coia of Gillespie, Kidd & Coia, 1931-3.	33912	Upload another image See more images
52-54 Langside Drive		19 March 1991	55°48′55″N 4°16′43″W	Late 19th century villa. Listed for its exceptional, near intact Glasgow Style interior.	33936	Upload Photo
Former Waverley Cinema	18 Moss-Side Road	17 June 1992	55°49′52″N 4°16′54″W	Watson, Salmond and Gray, 1922.	33941	Upload another image
Holmwood House	61, 63 Netherlee Road	17 June 1967	55°48′35″N 4°15′34″W	Alexander Thomson, 1857-59.	33944	Upload another image See more images
Pollokshaws Burgh Hall	2025 Pollokshaws Road	15 December 1970	55°49′31″N 4°17′54″W	Robert Rowand Anderson, 1895-8.	33953	Upload another image See more images
Anniesland Court	833-861 (Odd Nos) Crow Road, Anniesland	2 April 1996	55°53′27″N 4°19′31″W	Jack Holmes and Partners, 1966-8.	43034	Upload another image See more images
St Andrew's East Church Hall	685 Alexandra Parade	15 December 1970	55°51′47″N 4°12′30″W	James Salmon Junior and J Gaff Gillespie, 1899.	48569	Upload another image
Scottish Ambulance Service station and St Andrew's House, St Andrew's Ambulance Association	30 Maitland Street and 54 Milton Street	7 February 2005	55°52′04″N 4°15′24″W	Begun Skinner, Bailey & Lubetkin, followed by Bailey and Robb, circa 1966-70.	50073	Upload another image
Burrell Collection	2060 Pollokshaws Road, Pollok Country Park	23 January 2013	55°49′51″N 4°18′27″W	Barry Gasson Architects (firm), 1971-1983.	52002	Upload another image See more images

== See also ==
- Media related to Category A listed buildings in Glasgow at Wikimedia Commons
- List of listed buildings in Glasgow
- Scheduled monuments in Glasgow
- Architecture of Glasgow

== Bibliography ==
- William A. Brogden (ed), The Neo-classical Town: Scottish Contributions to Urban Design Since 1750, Rutland Press, 1996
- A.M. Doak, D. Walker, Glasgow at a Glance: an Architectural Handbook, Collins, 1965
- Glasgow Central Conservation Area Appraisal, City Design Group, Development & Regeneration Services, Glasgow City Council, 2012, (PDF)
- A. Gomme, D. Walker, Architecture of Glasgow, Lund Humphries, 1968
- Henry-Russell Hitchcock, Early Victorian Architecture in Britain, Yale, 1954
- John R. Hume, Industrial Archaeology of Glasgow, Blackie & Son, 1974
- Deborah Mays, The Architecture of Scottish Cities, Tuckwell Press, 2001
- Ronald McFadzean, Life and Work of Alexander Thomson, Routledge, 1979
- Charles McKean, Central Glasgow - an Illustrated Architectural Guide, Mainstream Publishing, 1989
- Ray McKenzie, Public Sculpture of Glasgow, Liverpool University Press, 2002
- Peter Reed, Glasgow: The Forming of The City, Edinburgh University Press, 1999
- Sam Small, Greater Glasgow: An Illustrated Architectural Guide, The Royal Incorporation of Architects in Scotland, 2008.
- Robin Ward, Exploring Glasgow: The Architectural Guide, Birlinn, 2017
- Elizabeth Williamson, Anne Riches, Malcolm Higgs, Buildings of Scotland: Glasgow, Yale, 1990
- F. Worsdall, Victorian City, Richard Drew, 1982
- Frank Worsdall, The Tenement: A Way of Life, Chambers, 1979
