= Denis William Brogan =

Scottish historian (1900–1974)

Sir Denis William Brogan
- Brogan in 1955
- Born: 11 August 1900
- Died: 5 January 1974 (aged 73)

Academic background
- Education: University of Glasgow; Balliol College, Oxford; Harvard University

Academic work
- Discipline: Historian
- Sub-discipline: Modern history; American political history; French political history
- Institutions: University College, London; London School of Economics; Corpus Christi College, Oxford; Peterhouse, Cambridge

Sir Denis William Brogan (11 August 1900 – 5 January 1974) was a Scottish writer and historian.

== Early life and education ==
Denis Brogan was born in Glasgow, the eldest son of Denis Brogan (1856–1934), a master tailor, and Elizabeth Toner. His father, originally from County Donegal, was a liberal-minded pro-Boer and Irish nationalist who, at one point, served as head of the Glasgow branch of the United Irish League, while his mother was a sister of John Toner, Bishop of Dunkeld. The younger Brogan was educated at St Columcille's Roman Catholic School, Rutherglen, and Rutherglen Academy. Having initially been cajoled by his parents to study medicine at the University of Glasgow, he switched to an arts degree following a series of low marks in his examinations, graduating MA Hons. in 1923. Brogan subsequently studied at Balliol College, Oxford, where he obtained a further degree in history in 1925. He then spent an additional year studying American politics at Harvard University on a Rockefeller Research Fellowship.

Brogan had three brothers, of whom the best known was the conservative journalist Colm Brogan (1902–1977). His other two siblings, Willie and Diarmuid, both taught at St Mungo's Academy in the East End of Glasgow.

== Career ==
Upon returning from Harvard, Brogan was briefly a journalist at The Times of London. He then chose to enter academia, acquiring successive teaching posts at University College, London, and the London School of Economics. It was while at the latter institution that Brogan published his work The American Political System (1933), which was later described in The Guardian as "in many ways replac[ing] the classic work of Lord Bryce on American politics." According to Herbert Butterfield, the left-wing economist Harold Laski endowed Brogan with "both the stimulus and the patronage" necessary to write the book.

In 1934, Brogan was elected a fellow of Corpus Christi College, Oxford. Five years later, in 1939, he moved to the University of Cambridge to take up the chair in political science, becoming a fellow of Peterhouse; he remained there until his retirement in 1968. He was elected to the American Academy of Arts and Sciences in 1966 and the American Philosophical Society in 1971. Brogan became known for broadcast radio talks, chiefly on historical themes, and as a panellist on BBC Radio's Round Britain Quiz, where he affected a testy, hyperacademic persona. In 1963, he was knighted.

== Death ==
Brogan died in Cambridge on 5 January 1974. He is buried in the Parish of the Ascension Burial Ground in Cambridge. His wife Olwen Phillis Francis (Lady Brogan), OBE, archaeologist and authority on Roman Libya and the mother of his four children – including the historian Hugh Brogan and journalist Patrick Brogan – is also buried in the same cemetery; she later became Olwen Hackett on her second marriage, when she married Charles Hackett.

== Works ==
- The American Political System (1933) Excerpts
- Proudhon (1934)
- Abraham Lincoln (1935)
- The Development of modern France, 1870–1939 (1940 and later editions)
- Politics and Law in the United States (1941) Excerpts
- Is Innocence Enough? Some reflections on foreign affairs (1941)
- The English People: Impressions and Observations (1943)
- The American Character (1944)
- The Free State: some considerations on its practical value (London, 1945)
- French Personalities and Problems (1945) Excerpts
- American Themes (1948)
- The Era of Franklin D. Roosevelt (1950)
- The Price of Revolution (1951)
- Politics in America (1954)
- The French Nation: from Napoleon to Pétain, 1814–1940 (1957)
- America in the Modern World (1960)
- Citizenship Today: England, France, the United States (1960)
- Political Patterns in Today's World, together with Douglas V. Verney (1963)
- American Aspects (1964)
- Worlds in Conflict (1967)
- France under the Republic (1974)
