= John Burnet (architect) =

Scottish architect

- Born: 27 September 1814; Kirk o' Shotts
- Died: 15 January 1901 (aged 86); Glasgow
- Occupation: Architect
- Awards: FRIBA
- Practice: John Burnet and Son, later Sir John Burnet & Partners
- Buildings: Glasgow Stock Exchange; Clydesdale Bank, Glasgow; Govan Burgh Chambers
- Design: Neolassical, Gothic, Renaissance, Italianate, Scottish Baronial, Greek Revival

John Burnet (27 September 1814 – 15 January 1901) was a Scottish architect who lived and practised in Glasgow. He was born the son of militia officer and trained initially as a carpenter, before becoming a Clerk of Works. He rose to prominence in the mid-1850s.

Burnet designed many of Victorian Glasgow's public buildings, employing a range of styles, including Neoclassical, Gothic, Renaissance, Italianate and Scottish Baronial. He commissioned many sculptors to adorn his buildings, among them John Mossman and John Crawford.

== Biography ==
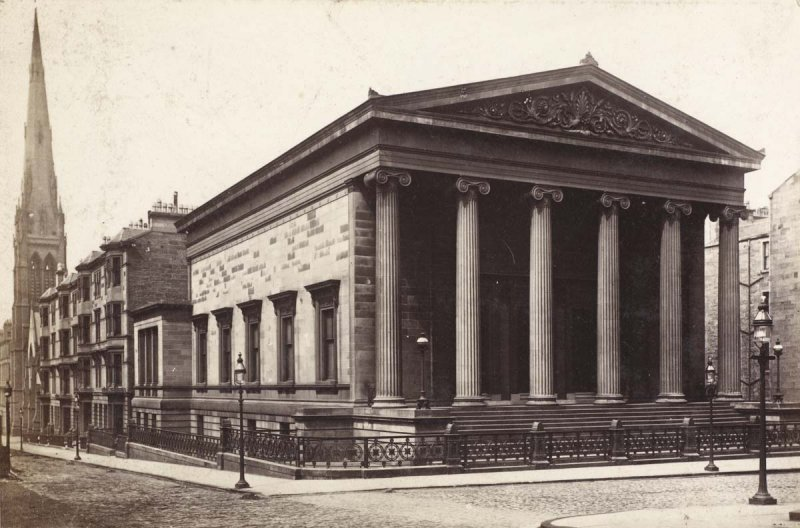
Elgin Place Congregational Church, 1856.

John Burnet was born at Craighead House, Kirk o' Shotts on 27 September 1814. He was the son of Lieutenant George Burnet, a soldier in the Kirkcudbright and Galloway Militia, and Margaret Wardlaw, who was the daughter of a Dalkeith merchant, John Wardlaw. John Burnet was educated at Dunipace Parish School. He later took an apprenticeship as a carpenter, graduating to architecture and becoming a clerk of works in the Alloa-Clackmannan area.

Burnet was largely self-taught as an architect. He worked for the Architectural Publication Society's Dictionary and through this work he had access to a library of architectural work by Jean-Nicolas-Louis Durand, Paul Letarouilly and Eugène Viollet-le-Duc. It is also known that Burnet travelled and sketched in Germany, France and Italy.

In 1845 he married Elizabeth Hay Bennet, the daughter of Lindsay Bennet, a Leith merchant. They had five children. The eldest, George Wardlaw, grew up to become Sheriff Substitute of Aberdeen but predeceased his father in an accident on a bamboo bicycle. His second son Lindsay Burnet, a mechanical engineer, and his youngest daughter Elizabeth also died before him. He had another daughter, Margaret. The most well-known of his children was his youngest son, John James Burnet (1857–1938), who himself became an influential Modernist architect.

Burnet architectural partnerships
| Dates | Practice name | Partners |
|---|---|---|
| 1882–1886 | John Burnet and Son | John Burnet, JJ Burnet |
| 1886–1897 | John Burnet, Son and Campbell | John Archibald Campbell |
| 1897–1919 | John Burnet and Son | reverted to old name after Campbell left |
| 1918–1930 | Sir John Burnet & Partners | Thomas Smith Tait and David Raeside |
| 1919-1920 or 1921 | John Burnet, Son & Partners | Thomas Harold Hughes |
| 1921–1940 | Burnet, Son & Dick | Norman Aitken |
| 1930-c.1949 | Sir John Burnet, Tait & Lorne | JJ Burnet, Thomas Smith Tait and Francis Lorne (later also Gordon Thomas Tait) |

In the mid-1850s John Burnet (senior) rose in prominence with his designs for Glasgow buildings such as the Greek temple-style Elgin Place Church, the Clapperton/Middleton warehouse on Miller Street, and Madeira Court on Argyle Street, which was shows influences of the work of Charles Wilson. He won commissions in the 1860s from Glasgow merchants and shipowners, building large baronial houses for them at Auchendennan, Arden, Kildalton and Kilmahew.

In 1869 he had a business address at 150 St Vincent Street in Glasgow and lived in Victoria Crescent Road in the Dowanhill area of the city.

Burnet became an accomplished Gothic designer, which is evident in his designs for Woodlands Church and the Glasgow Stock Exchange.

Burnet became a Fellow of the Royal Institute of British Architects (FRIBA) in 1876.

In 1882, he formed and architectural partnership with his son John James Burnet (1857–1938). As his son John James took a greater role in the architects' practice, Burnet was less active in the design of buildings, acting increasingly as a consultant. In 1886 John Archibald Campbell joined the partnership, and around 1889 Burnet senior went into semi-retirement at the age of seventy-five.

John Burnet died in Glasgow on 15 January 1901, leaving moveable estate of £3,210 5s 2d.

== Notable works ==
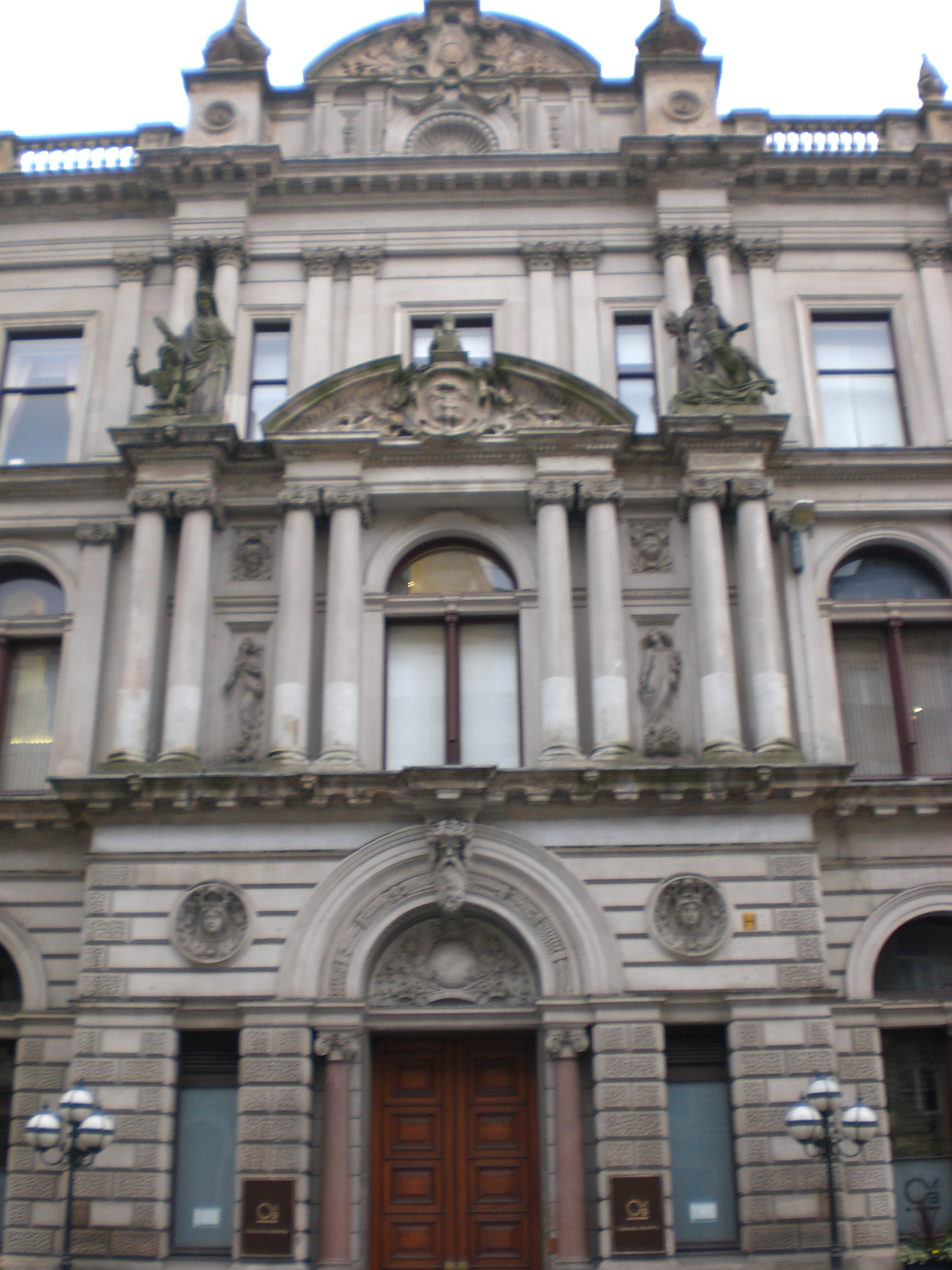
Clydesdale Bank HQ, Glasgow

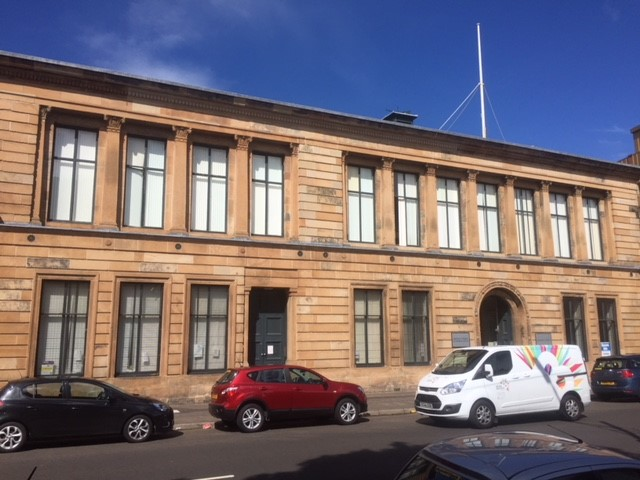
Govan Burgh Chambers

Three of Glasgow's most important buildings are credited to Burnet Senior in his later years: the Clydesdale Bank headquarters in St Vincent Place, the Merchants' House and the Union Bank of Scotland building (the latter assisted by his son).

Among his surviving works are:

- Glasgow Stock Exchange, 159 Buchanan Street
- Merchants' House, 7 West George Street
- Fitzroy Place, Sauchiehall Street (1847)
- Bank of Scotland, 1-3 Bridge Street, (1857)
- Alexander's School, 94 Duke Street (1858)
- Govan Burgh Chambers, 18-20 Orkney Street (1867)
- Campbeltown Parish Church (1870-1872)
- Arlington Baths Club (1870–1871)
- Tomb of George Baillie outside Glasgow Cathedral (1873)
- Woodlands Parish Church, Woodlands Gate, (1874)
- Overnewton School, 50 Lumsden Street (1877)
- Lanarkshire House (now the Corinthian Club), 191 Ingram Street, (1876)
- Killean House, Tayinloin (1876)
- John McIntyre Building, University of Glasgow (1886)
- Hotel (now Youth Hostel), Lochranza, Arran (1893-94)
- Gardner Memorial Church of Scotland, Brechin

Other work has been destroyed or demolished, including:

- Elgin Place Congregational Church, 193-5 Pitt Street (1856, demolished 2004)
- Eglinton Congregational Church, 341 Eglinton Street (1866, demolished 2000)
- Western Infirmary, Dumbarton Road, (1874, demolished 1981).

He is buried in the Western Necropolis.
