= John Leck Bruce =

Scottish-born architect, sanitary engineer and teacher

- Born: 16 October 1850; Glasgow, Lanarkshire, Scotland
- Died: 29 November 1921 (aged 71); Blakehurst, Sydney, New South Wales, Australia
- Occupation: Architect
- Practice: Bruce & Sturrock
- Buildings: Arlington Baths Club

John Leck Bruce (16 October 1850 – 29 November 1921) was a Scottish-born architect, sanitary engineer and teacher. He was born in Glasgow to Robert Bruce (clerk), and his wife Jane (née Leck).

Bruce began practising professionally at 21 years old (1871/72), and in 1874/75 he took David Sturrock into partnership under "Bruce & Sturrock", as well as working as a consulting engineer for Glasgow Corporation. He was one of the architects contributing to the development of the Victorian Turkish baths at the Arlington Baths Club Glasgow and presented a paper to the Philosophical Society of Glasgow on the heating of Turkish baths in 1879.

In 1877, he married Charlotte Florence Cochran in Birkenhead, England. They had five children: Robert (1878–unknown), Charles John (1880–1961), Gerald Whitney (1882–1917), Cecile Blanche Ritchie (1891–1959) and Maida Charlotte Jean (1895–1943).

In 1887, he migrated to Australia and settled in Sydney, New South Wales. In 1889, he became a foreman of works in the government architect's branch of the Department of Public Works, and from 1891 until his death he worked as first lecturer in sanitary engineering at Sydney Technical College.

Bruce worked as the Sydney editor of Building and Engineering Journal of Australia and New Zealand and assistant editor of Australian Technical Journal, and in 1901 he authored The Australian Sanitary Inspector's Textbook. He died in 1921 of cerebral thrombosis in Blakehurst, Sydney.
