= Colm Brogan =

Scottish journalist and author

Colm Brogan (20 October 1902 – 28 January 1977) was a Scottish journalist and writer.

== Background ==
He was born in Glasgow to Denis Brogan, a tailor from County Donegal. One of Colm Brogan's four brothers was the historian Denis William Brogan and his maternal grandfather was a founder of Celtic F.C. He was educated at St Aloysius (a Jesuit college) and then at Glasgow University, where he studied English. After attending teacher training college, Brogan became a master at St Mungo's Academy and then at St Gerard's.

== Career ==
Brogan began his career in journalism by writing for the Glasgow University magazine and the Scottish schoolmasters' periodical. He then began a weekly column in the Glasgow Bulletin before moving to The Herald. He also worked for The Daily Telegraph as a leader-writer and wrote a daily column for the Daily Sketch.

He reviewed Whittaker Chambers's posthumous book in "The Comfort of Cold Friday" for National Review magazine (29 December 1964).

In Who are 'the People'? published in 1943, he promoted the idea that political ideologies of the Left were responsible for the rise to power of Adolf Hitler. He continued with this thesis in Our New Masters, published in 1947. Michael Foot replied to Who are 'the People'? with Who are the Patriots?, to which Brogan wrote Patriots? My Foot! in response. Our New Masters was an attack on Clement Attlee's Labour government.

== Legacy ==
After his death, The Times described Brogan as:

one of the few journalists and pamphleteers of the Welfare era to assail the idols and institutions of the Left with the same zest and skill that Socialist intellectuals devoted to personalities and policies of the Right. ... Brogan's pamphleteering was the more vigorous because he had no reverence for the Conservative establishment. It was disconcerting to conventional Tories to discover an ally contemptuous of the Crown, but Brogan conformed to no class-image. In the first postwar years he rapidly turned out anonymous colloquial leaflets addressed to working-class readers.

== Books ==
- Who are 'The People'? (1943)
- The Democrat at the Supper Table (1945)
- Our New Masters (1947)
- They Are Always Wrong (1949)
- Patriots? My Foot! (1949)
- Fifty Years On: British Socialism, 1900-1950 (1950)
- Glasgow Story (1952)
- The Educational Revolution (1955)
- Suez: Who was right? (1957)
- The Nature of Education (1962)
