= Botanic Gardens Garage =

Architectural structure in Glasgow City, Scotland

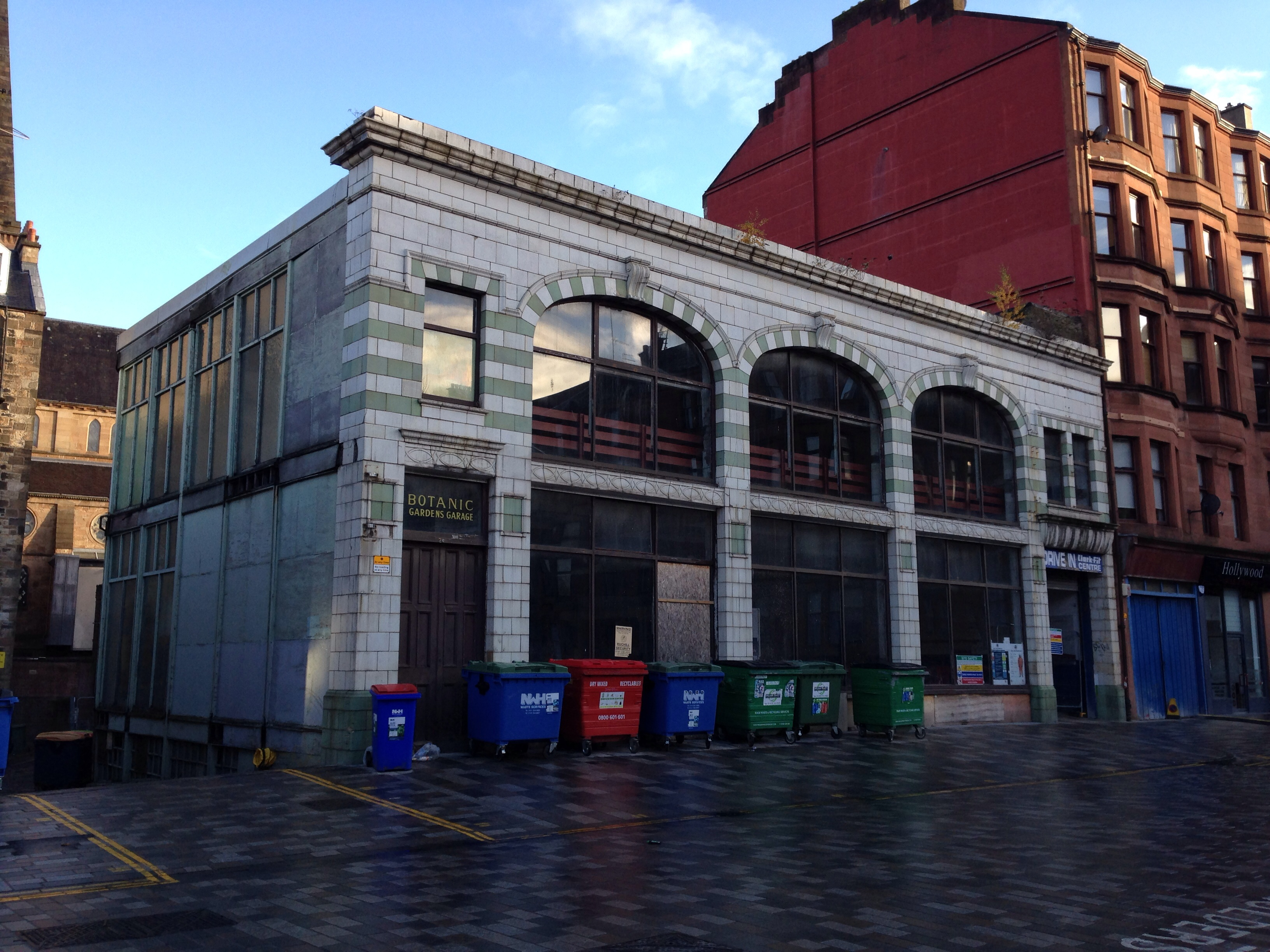

General information
- Location: 24 Vinicombe St, Glasgow, Scotland
- Coordinates: 55°52′38″N 4°17′24″W

The Botanic Gardens Garage is a two-story, five-bay Category A-listed building in the West End of Glasgow, Scotland. It is located on Vinicombe Street, a one-minute-walk from the Glasgow Botanic Gardens. It is the oldest surviving purpose-built motor garage in Glasgow. The building is no longer used as a garage, and instead houses restaurants and a gym.

== History ==
David V. Wyllie was the architect and it was built between 1906 and 1912. In the 1920s the proprietor was Alexander Kennedy.

The building has been owned by Arnold Clark since the 1960s. In the 1970s, with two new balcony ramps fitted, the firm positioned the garage as a master workshop within the city. It included car boy repair and a paint shop. It became vacant in 2006 and the owners initially planned to demolish it. In December 2007 the building was designated a category A listed building. The owners then looked to convert it for residential, retail and other commercial use. The decision was referred to Scottish Government ministers for the final approval. The company withdrew their plans to demolish the building and in 2014 a planning application was granted to convert it into a gym. Work was suspended in December 2016 when a wall collapsed on three workmen. After restoration work was completed it was named as a finalist at the Scottish Property Awards 2020, in the Regeneration Project of the Year category.
