= John Crawford (sculptor) =

Scottish sculptor

John Crawford (1830–1861) was a talented Scottish sculptor, apprenticed to John Mossman. He attended Glasgow School of Art, where he won many prizes and attracted the attention of art collectors. He set up his own studio (at 28 Mason Street) in 1858 and was one of the many British sculptors who worked with John Thomas on the new Houses of Parliament. He and most of his family died in the typhus epidemic of 1861 - the same one that carried away Prince Albert of Saxe-Coburg and Gotha.

The quality of his work is evident from the carved heads on Alexander's School (later St Kentigern's Annex) in Duke Street Glasgow. Other work has been demolished or lost, though the armorial set on the Bank of Scotland in Carlton Place still exists.

His son John M. Crawford (1854 - ) became an architect, designing among others, Dennistoun Baptist Church in Craigpark Drive (1907)
