= James Salmon (architect, born 1805) =

Scottish architect

James Salmon (1805-1888) was a Scottish architect, active chiefly in Glasgow and the west of Scotland.

Salmon served his apprenticeship with John Brash, who between 1823 and 1829 designed the houses of Glasgow's Blythswood Square. Salmon would no doubt have been involved with the work. One of the great architectural opportunities of 19th century Glasgow came in the opening up of whole new areas for development and the freedom to design them. This was the opportunity Brash had with Blythswood Square. James Salmon's chance came with the planning of the new suburb of Dennistoun. In 1854, he planned an area of ornamental villas and self-contained houses mixed with terraces and open spaces. Unfortunately, very little of this came about since the area was too near the industrial heart of the city to become popular. By 1861, Salmon's plans had been discarded. Of the original design only Westercraigs survives - with a few of the 'ornamental villas' and four terraces. Surviving buildings in the city designed by Salmon in succeeding partnerships include:

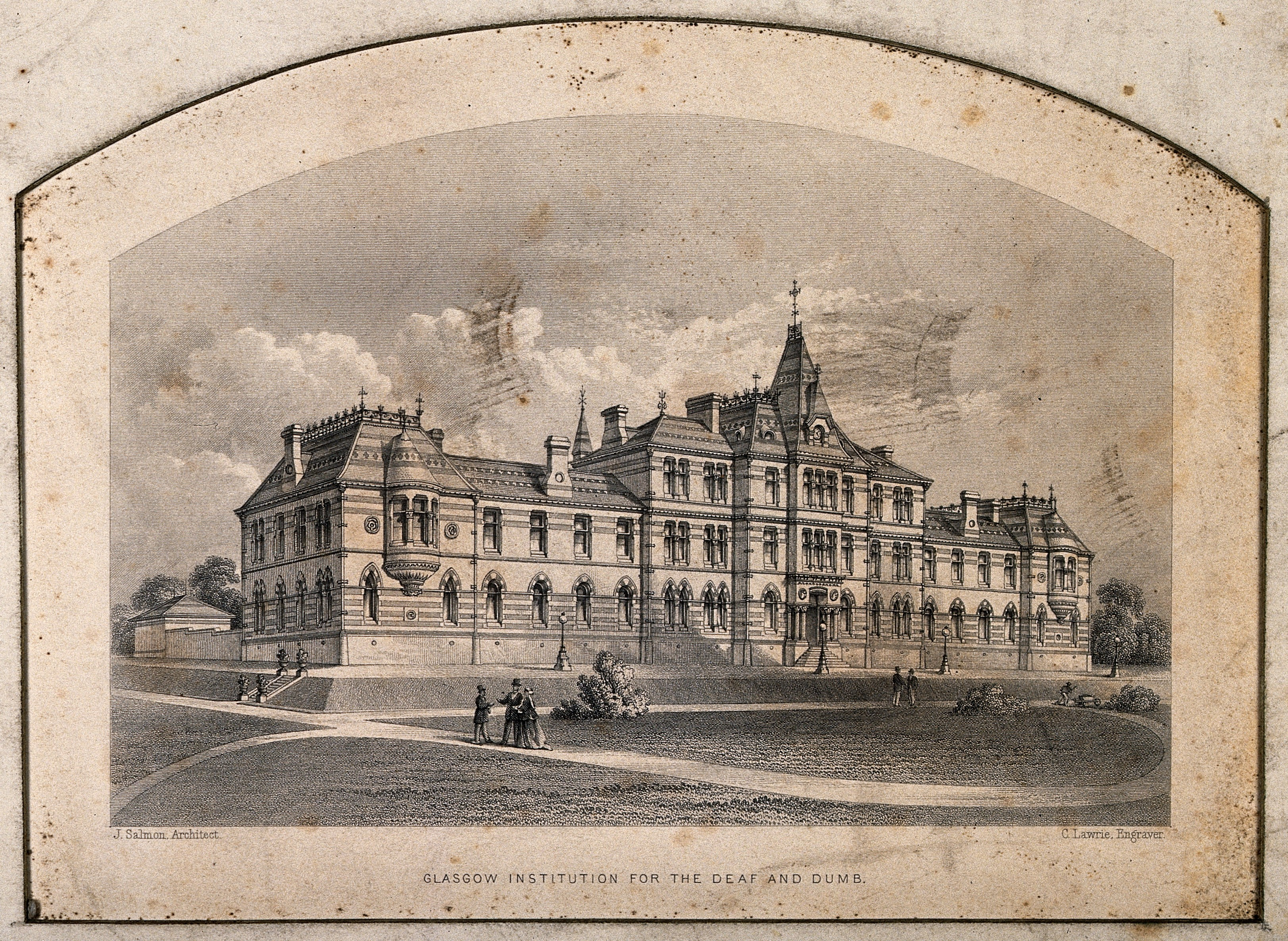
The Deaf and Dumb Institution

- 65-81 Millar Street - Warehouse 149/5 1 in partnership with Robert Black.
- 191 Ingram Street - Lanarkshire House (1853) in partnership with Robert Black.
- 38 Bath Street - Originally Mechanics' Institute (1861).
- 50 Prospecthill Road - Deaf Institute (afterwards Langside College) (1866) Salmon, Son & Richie.
- 22 Park Circus, Glasgow - briefing from Walter Macfarlane II of the Saracen Foundry, who asked Salmon and J. Gaff Gillespie to modernise the building after the death of his uncle Walter Macfarlane

There were also some "working" tenements in Plantation.

James Salmon died on 5 May 1888, while walking to his home at Broomknowe, Broompark Circus, Dennistoun.

James Salmon's architectural practice, opened in 1830, eventually became Gillespie, Kidd & Coia, one of Scotland's most renowned modernist architectural firms.

James Salmon's grandson, James, was also a notable architect in Glasgow.
