= Alexander's School =

Coordinates: 55°51′35″N 4°14′08″W

- Duke Street, Glasgow,

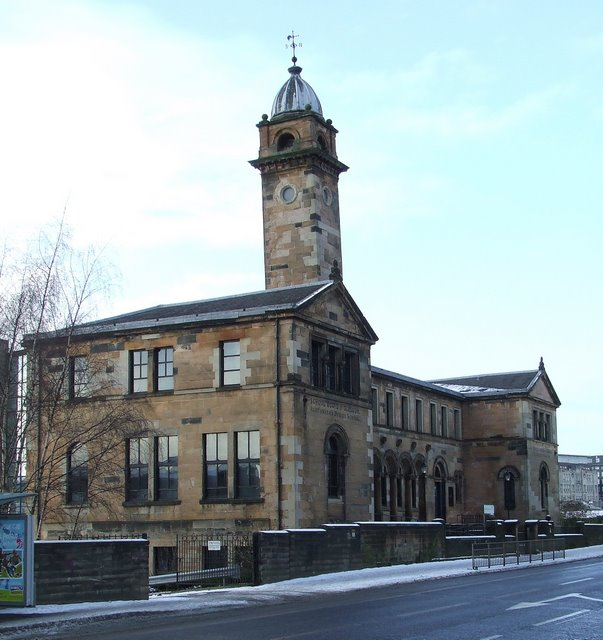
Former Alexanders Public School

Alexander's School, at 94 Duke Street, Glasgow, was designed by John Burnet and built in 1858 at a cost of £6000 for James Alexander, the proprietor of the cotton mill next door - itself an innovative 1849 fire-proof construction - to educate local children. It was known as "Alexander's Endowed School".

It is built in an impressive Italianate style, with the heads of Homer, Aristotle, Shakespeare, Michelangelo and Milton carved high on the front wall by John Crawford. The site is close to where the University of Glasgow stood in the 19th century, and was opposite Duke Street Women's Prison.

Following the Education (Scotland) Act 1872, it became a state school known as the Ladywell School - the district has a well long associated with Our Lady - and in the 1960s became an Annexe to St Mungo's Academy. This was removed in 1977 to Crownpoint Road and the building housed a special education school.

The building was protected as a category B listed building in 1970, and this was upgraded to category A in 1998.

In 1996 it was taken over by the East End Partnership, a local agency dedicated to urban regeneration. This commissioned extensive renovation in 2000 to form The Ladywell Business Centre, housing small businesses.
