= Arlington Baths Club =

Swimming club in Glasgow, Scotland

Coordinates: 55°52′15″N 4°16′24″W

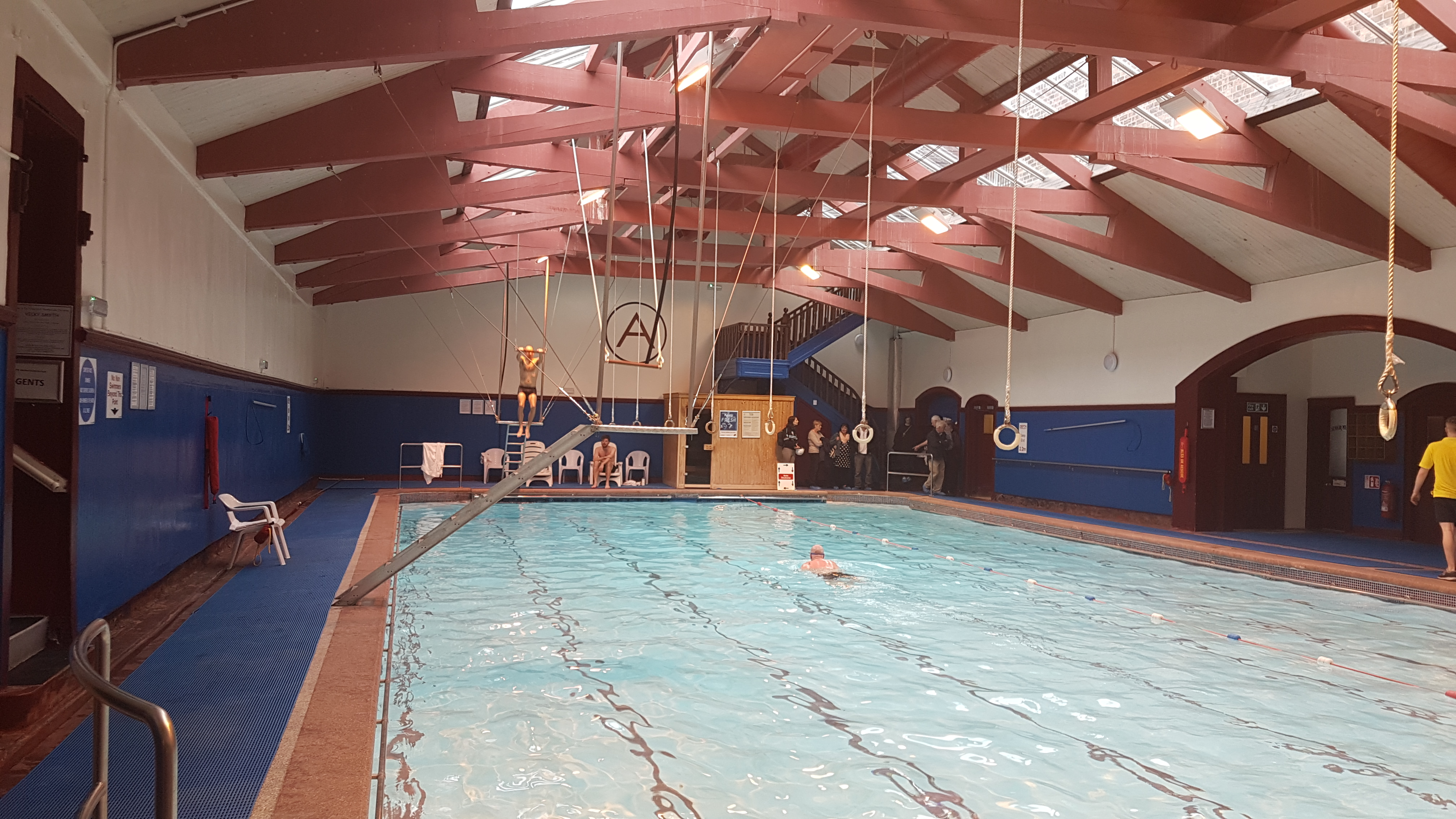
The Arlington Baths, swimming pool, 2018

Arlington Baths Club is a non-profit member-run swimming club in Glasgow. The Arlington Baths Club was the first swimming club in Glasgow and is located in a purpose-built Category A Listed Building that opened on 1 August 1871.

The building is in the Charing Cross neighbourhood and was part of the westward development of the city. It was designed largely in the traditional tenement idiom, albeit with some exceptions such as the famous Charing Cross Mansions. The area quickly attracted well-off middle-class residents who were the primary members of the Arlington Baths Club.

The membership typically showed up first thing in the morning before leaving for work and returned in the evening after work before leaving for home. These behaviours created the club's customs.

A replica of the Arlington Baths was built soon after in London, however, the drawings of the Arlington were stolen sometime towards the end of the 19th century. This replica was bombed during the Second World War and was never rebuilt. The building of the Arlington Baths coincided with the implementation of the first of the Public Health Acts in 1870 and was considered by some to be the precursor to the growth of public bathing in the United Kingdom.

== Building history ==
=== Original building ===
The building was originally designed by John Burnet, the father of Sir John James Burnet. He designed the part of the building containing the swimming pool, the senior and junior baths, and the senior changing room and smoking room, which now forms the northern part of the building.

As originally designed by Burnet, the building was single story and conceived as a kind of theme and variation on the idea of subdivision by twos and threes. Thus, the main façade onto Arlington Street was modulated by means of two pavilions, located at either end of the building with the centre marked by arched windows arranged in groups of threes.

One entered the building at the higher level through the arched entrance in the middle of the façade, coming straight out onto the transverse axis of the pool. From this point, the emphasis of the building swung through ninety degrees onto the main axis of the pool hall along which the other accommodation was laid out.

Burnet's intention was to create a composition organized symmetrically, that is by halves, but relieved by a sub-division by threes.

The original building is now protected as a category A listed building.

=== First extension ===
In 1875, four years after the club was opened, an extension was built allowing the membership to increase to six hundred. This was constructed by Charles Drake utilizing his pioneering poured concrete construction technique.

At the front, stands the entrance hall, shoe hall and a reading room (now the members' lounge). Behind this area is the Victorian Turkish baths suite. This comprises a large square room, heated to high temperatures by a plenum, with tiled walls and floor, and a dome-shaped ceiling studded with small star-shaped windows glazed with colored glass. There is also a fountain in the centre, no longer functioning. The remainder of the Turkish Suite consists of a hot room, cool room, shampooing room and washing room. Originally, the washing room connected to the pool via a swim through.

Shortly after the extension was completed, the club's Turkish baths stove was part of an important heating efficiency experiment conducted by John Leck Bruce who compared its heat-loss calculations with those of the baths stove at another Glasgow club, the Victoria.

=== Second extension ===
By 1893, more space was needed. Andrew Myles was employed as an architect to add billiard and card rooms. This extension added another story accessed by a grand staircase, which in turn led to a junior billiard room (now reading room), senior billiard room, card room, and other administrative spaces, on the first floor Myles extended the facade up to form a space with exposed roof trusses, added glazing at the apex and added a five windowed loggia above the entrance.

=== Third extension ===
In 1902, the club added a story to the street frontage of Burnet's original building. This did not extend the pool hall itself, but simply the bank of rooms which lay between the pool hall and the street.

The club hired Benjamin Conner as the architect. He extended the front wall of the original building directly upwards to create a new larger billiard hall and dressing room now used as a gym. Exposed timber roof trusses and partial roof glazing were used in these spaces.

Since the work carried out by Conner, no further large-scale additions have taken place to the fabric of the building. Numerous smaller-scale alterations have taken place. Internal alterations carried out during the late 1960s and 1970s in order to comply with fire safety legislation have damaged the interior of the building.

== Naturist swimming ==
Arlington Baths offers a naturist swim to those over eighteen on Sunday evenings, dubbed “The Sunday Swim”. The swim allows people who are not members of the baths to swim completely nude and make use of the baths’ Turkish suite, steam room, and saunas. Nude yoga classes are also offered.
