= 1 Prince's Terrace =

Scottish monument

Coordinates: 55°52′37.1″N 4°18′2.4″W

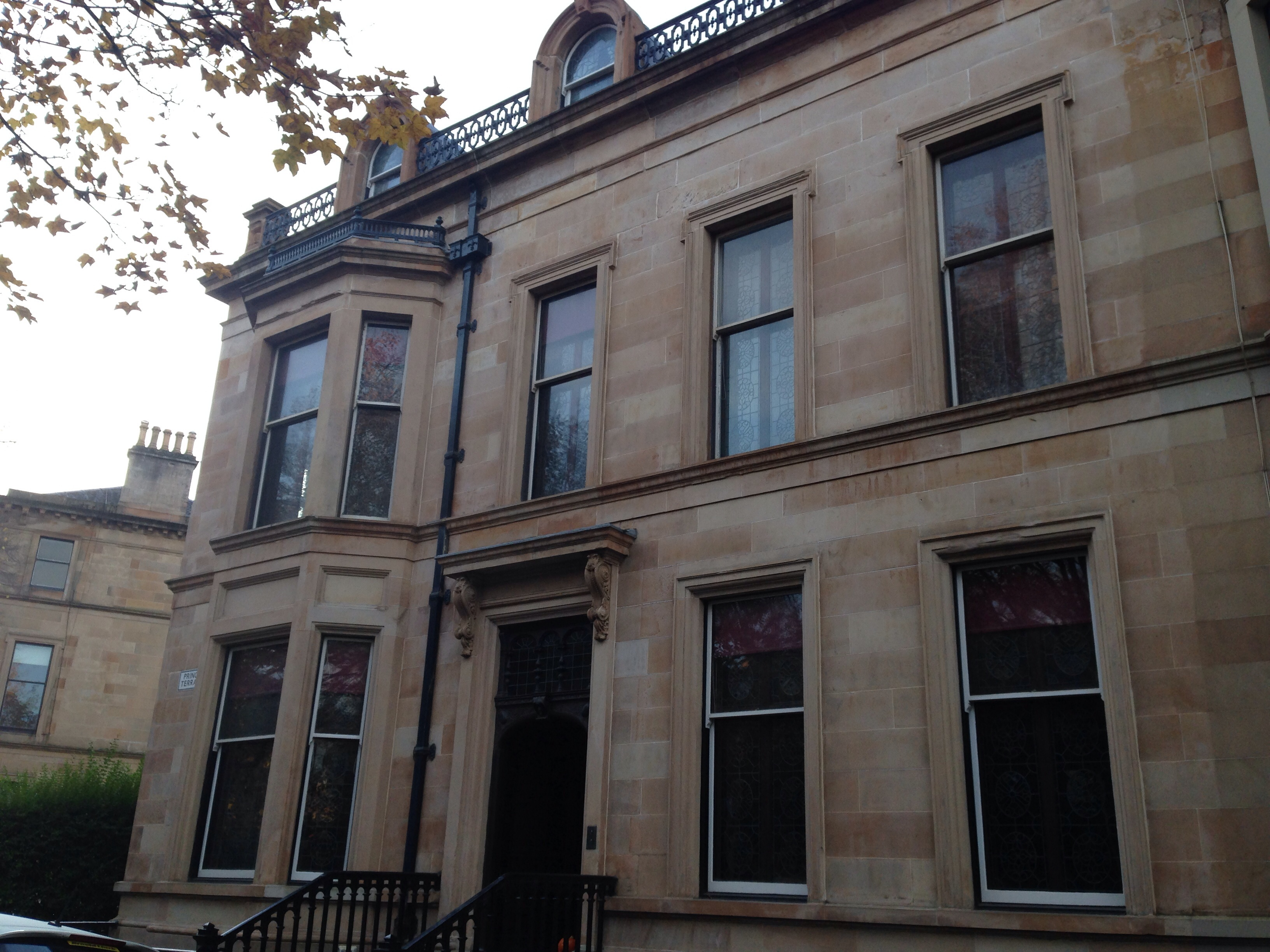
1 Prince's Terrace

1 Prince's Terrace is a residential building in the Scottish city of Glasgow. In 1970, the building was included in the Scottish monument lists as an individual monument in Category A, the highest monument category.

== History ==
The building was built around 1870. The Scottish architect James Thomson provided the design. The local starch producer James Morrice bought house number 1 in 1895. Morrice, who lived in the building until 1932, had the interior completely redesigned around 1900.

== Description ==
The two-story building is the corner house between Prince's Terrace and Queen's Place in the northwest of Glasgow. The building is designed in the historic Italianate style. Its north-facing main facade is four axes wide. A short front staircase leads to the double-leaf entrance door. It is equipped with side windows, fighter window, architrave and on consoles bearing crown decorations. On the left there is a beveled, two-story promontory. It ends with a flat, cast iron railing. Cornices divide the facade horizontally. The arched dormers are designed with archivolts in relief. A cast iron balustrade runs between the dormers. The roof is covered with slate.
