= The Briggait =

Category A listed building in Glasgow, Scotland

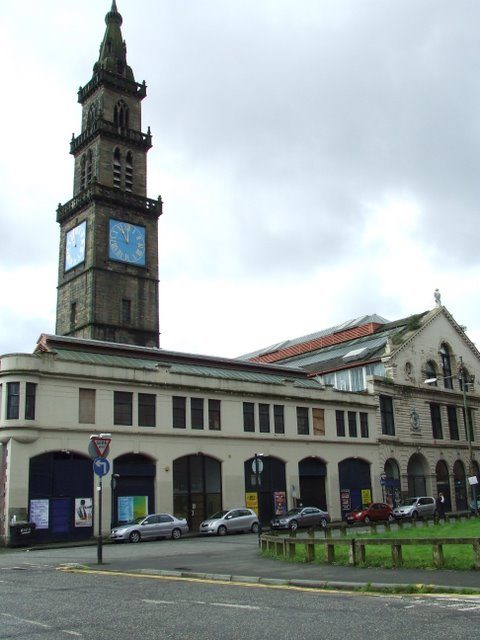
- The Briggait Centre complete with steeple
- Interactive map of the The Briggait area

General information
- Status: Category A listed
- Location: Glasgow, Scotland
- Coordinates: 55.8545°N 4.2494°W
- Current tenants: Wasps artists' studios
- Completed: 1873
- Renovated: 2010

Website
- http://www.waspsstudios.org.uk/

The Briggait is a category A listed building in Glasgow, Scotland, situated in the Merchant City area on the Bridgegate (A8) and Clyde Street (A814) just north of the River Clyde. Construction of the building was completed in 1873.

== History ==
The building was originally used as Glasgow's fish market until the late 1970s. It was then converted into a shopping centre during the 1980s – this proved to be a temporary venture. In the 21st century it was converted into artists studios which opened to the public in August 2010.

The incorporated steeple, which dates back to 1659 as part of the Merchants' House trade body headquarters (they later moved to new premises at George Square) and is a Category A listed structure in its own right, has been restored.
