= James Salmon (architect, born 1873) =

Scottish architect (1873–1924)

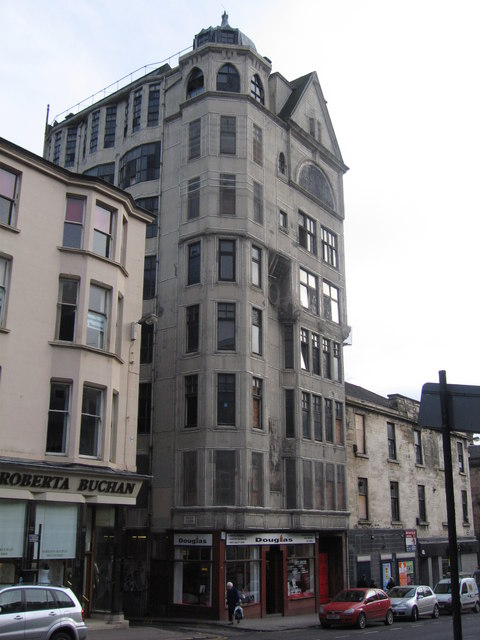
Lion Chambers, Hope Street (1904–1905)

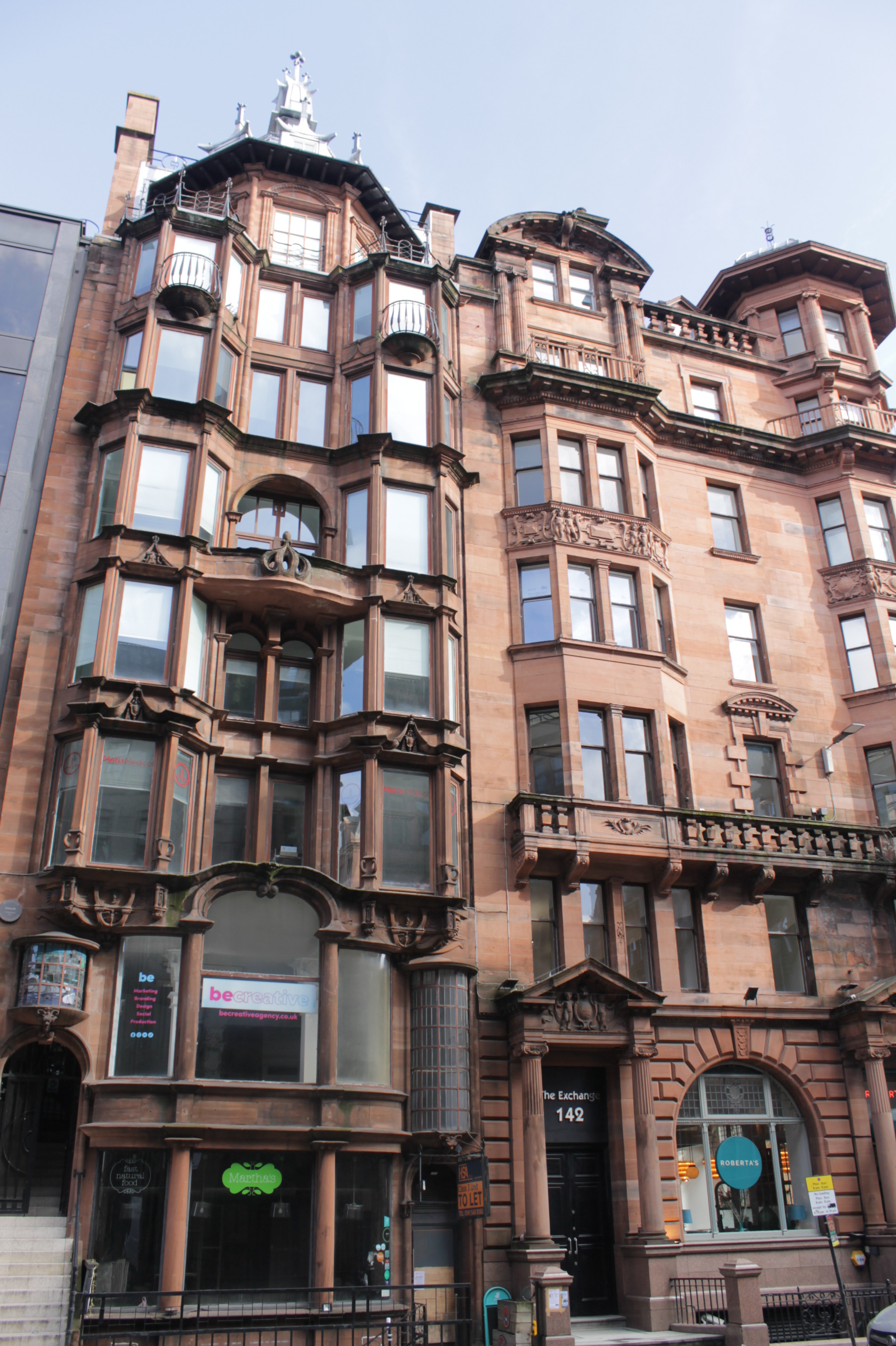
The Hatrack Building, St Vincent Street, Glasgow (1899-1902)

James Salmon (13 April 1873 – 27 April 1924) was a Scottish architect, who practiced mainly in Glasgow. With his partner, John Gaff Gillespie, he developed an attenuated high-rise style for the office buildings of the fin de siecle cities.

One of his most famous buildings is the category-A listed "The Hatrack" (1899–1902) in St Vincent Street, a heavily glass-fronted Modern Style (British Art Nouveau style) tower, remarkable in execution for its day. This building was only recently rescued from demolition.

Salmon was born in Glasgow, the son of architect William Forrest Salmon (1843–1911) and Jessie Alexander, and grandson of architect James Salmon (1805–1888). He was educated at Glasgow High School from 1883 to 1888, when he joined the architecture practice his grandfather had established in 1830. James senior had died that year, leaving William in charge. James junior attended classes at Glasgow School of Art from 1888 until 1895, and completed his apprenticeship in the office of William Leiper (1839–1916). On completion of his articles he undertook a grand tour, taking in France, Germany, Switzerland, Norway, Belgium, Holland, Austria, Hungary, Romania, Turkey, Greece and Spain.

Some works include:

- Rowantreehill in Kilmacolm (1898) (tudor, art nouveau)
- Hatrack Building, St Vincent Street, Glasgow (1899-1902)
- chauffeur's house in Gallowshill (1903)
- Miyanoshta in Kilmacolm (1905) (romantic, art nouveau)
- Lion Chambers in Glasgow (1905)
- Den o' Gryffe (c.1903) (art nouveau)
- Hazelhope in Kilmacolm (c.1900) (tudor, art nouveau)
- Northernhay in Kilmacolm (1906) (modernism)
- Nether Knockbuckle in Kilmacolm (c.1910)
- North Lodge in Edzell (1906) (Arts & Crafts)

In 1895 Salmon rejoined the family firm, where John Gaff Gillespie (1870–1926) was now a partner. He worked on designs for the Mercantile Chambers in Bothwell Street, and was himself made a partner in 1898. In that same year he designed his first villa for his father. In November 1903 the firm was renamed Salmon Son & Gillespie. He continued to undertake study tours to Europe, and was admitted as a Fellow of the Royal Institute of British Architects (RIBA) in 1906. Salmon's designs were largely in the Glasgow Style of Art Nouveau, influenced by the sculptors he had met at Glasgow School of Art, and by the architecture of the Arts and Crafts movement. In 1904-5 Salmon was responsible for the Lion Chambers on Hope Street, an early example of reinforced concrete construction.

William Forrest Salmon died in 1911, leaving his share of the partnership to his second wife Agnes, James Salmon's stepmother. Gillespie bought out Agnes' interest, becoming senior partner, and later taking on William Kidd (1879–1929) to form the basis of the modernist practice Gillespie, Kidd & Coia. Salmon left the practice in 1913, retaining a commission for the Admiralty Village at Greenock, and setting up on his own as James Salmon & Son. When the First World War broke out, this connection brought further commissions, although he had little other work after the split. After the war, he concentrated on domestic and hospital work. In 1923 he retired due to bowel cancer, and died the following April.
