= Martyrs' Public School =

Building in Glasgow, Scotland

Coordinates: 55.8653°N 4.2374°W

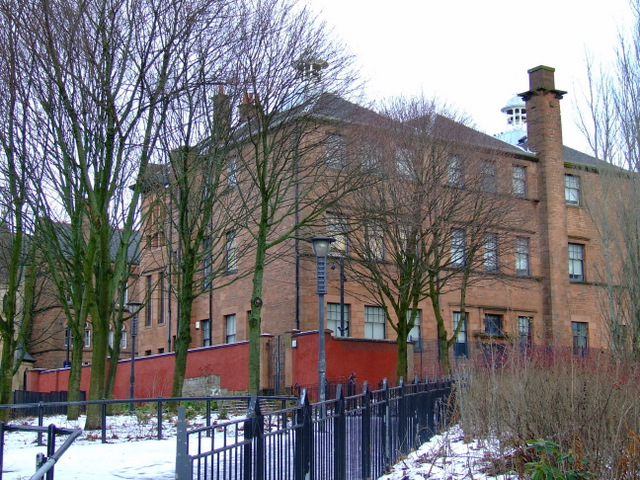
The Martyrs School building

The Martyrs' Public School, in Parson Street in the Townhead area of Glasgow, Scotland, is one of the earlier works of architect Charles Rennie Mackintosh. Until recently, an arts centre run by Glasgow Museums, it is now home to Glasgow City Council's Social Work Leaving Care Services. It is protected as a category A listed building. Stranded above the main road it was once set in the middle of a densely populated area of tenement buildings. It was built following the Education (Scotland) Act 1872 which provided for increased public expenditure on education. Commissioned by the School Board of Glasgow and built between 1895 and 1898, the architects were Honeyman and Keppie.

At the time, Charles Rennie Mackintosh was a senior assistant in the practice and his influence can be seen in the building, especially in the details. It was built largely of red sandstone, as were many of Glasgow's public buildings of this period, and has many hints of Scotland's architectural heritage. Inside there is a light central open space, used for access and for school assemblies. Above this two galleries run around the building, giving access to classrooms. Another classroom block spread to the north. There are Art Nouveau details round the doorways, which indicate separate entrances for Boys, Girls and Infants, as was the custom of the time. The ironwork is often fine, as is the woodwork. The external massing and windows have attracted varying comment.

The building served for many years as the non-denominational public school for Townhead. After the Second World War, following another Education Act, it became the Martyrs' Primary School. In 1959 it was briefly a part of Stow College, but in 1961 became an annex to St Mungo's Academy and remained so until 1973. It was an Arts Centre for a time, run by the Forum Arts Trust.
