= John Baird I =

Scottish architect

John Baird I (1798-1859)
- Portrait of John Baird I by James MacLehose

John Baird (1799– 18 December 1859) was a Glasgow architect of the 19th century, also called John Baird Primus by Thomas Gildard (from the book An Old Glasgow Architect on some Older Ones) in order for people to be able distinguish him from a second John Baird (1816-93). He was an influential figure in the development of Glasgow’s late Georgian and early Victorian Architecture. He was responsible for around 40 projects and worked in the "background" compared to other Glasgow architects.

== Life and work ==
John Baird was born in the village of Dalmuir, Dunbartonshire (now part of the town of Clydebank). He was the son of Thomas Baird, a Wright, and Agnes Baird, and he was the elder brother of another architect with the name of Anthony Baird (practised, 1834-5).

At the age of 15, he started training as an architect with a relative of his named John Shepherd, of John Shepherd & Co., which was a firm that consisted of architects and property agents and was located at 636 Argyle Street. While he was an apprentice, the firm completed the west terrace of Carlton Place for Peter Nicholson. In 1818, when he was 20 and barely out of his apprenticeship and after Shepherd’s death, he took over the business.

Baird's design style was similar to Greek and Roman architecture with slight modifications and it also leans slightly towards the Tudor and early British Renaissance architecture styles. After his design of the Greyfriars United Presbyterian Church on North Albion Street, it began his public career in 1822. He never participated in architectural competitions, calling them "a species of professional speculation - to use a mild epithet - which he consistently protested against to the last" and he managed to progress his career significantly. Despite this, he was due to act as a judge on the necropolis competition with David Hamilton. Baird designed a total of twelve churches, more than any other building type he has designed. These churches were fashionable to the time period, yet not quite of a Gothic style.

Baird’s most important contribution to the city of Glasgow’s architecture was his spearheading use of the cast iron in his buildings’ constructions. The earlier use of the cast iron was for the roof trusses in the Argyll Arcade, in 28-32 Buchanan Street (1827).

Baird designed the lands of Claremont, the numerous houses and grounds that needed to be replaced. He worked with the design of George Smith from Edinburgh for the adjacent lands of South Woodside and this consequently increased the value of both of these properties. Baird also designed Claremont House, which is now the centre of Claremont Terrace though it used to be a sole property. This house is an excellent example of Baird’s domestic design as it is a large and neatly arranged town house that has a frontage of 58 feet.

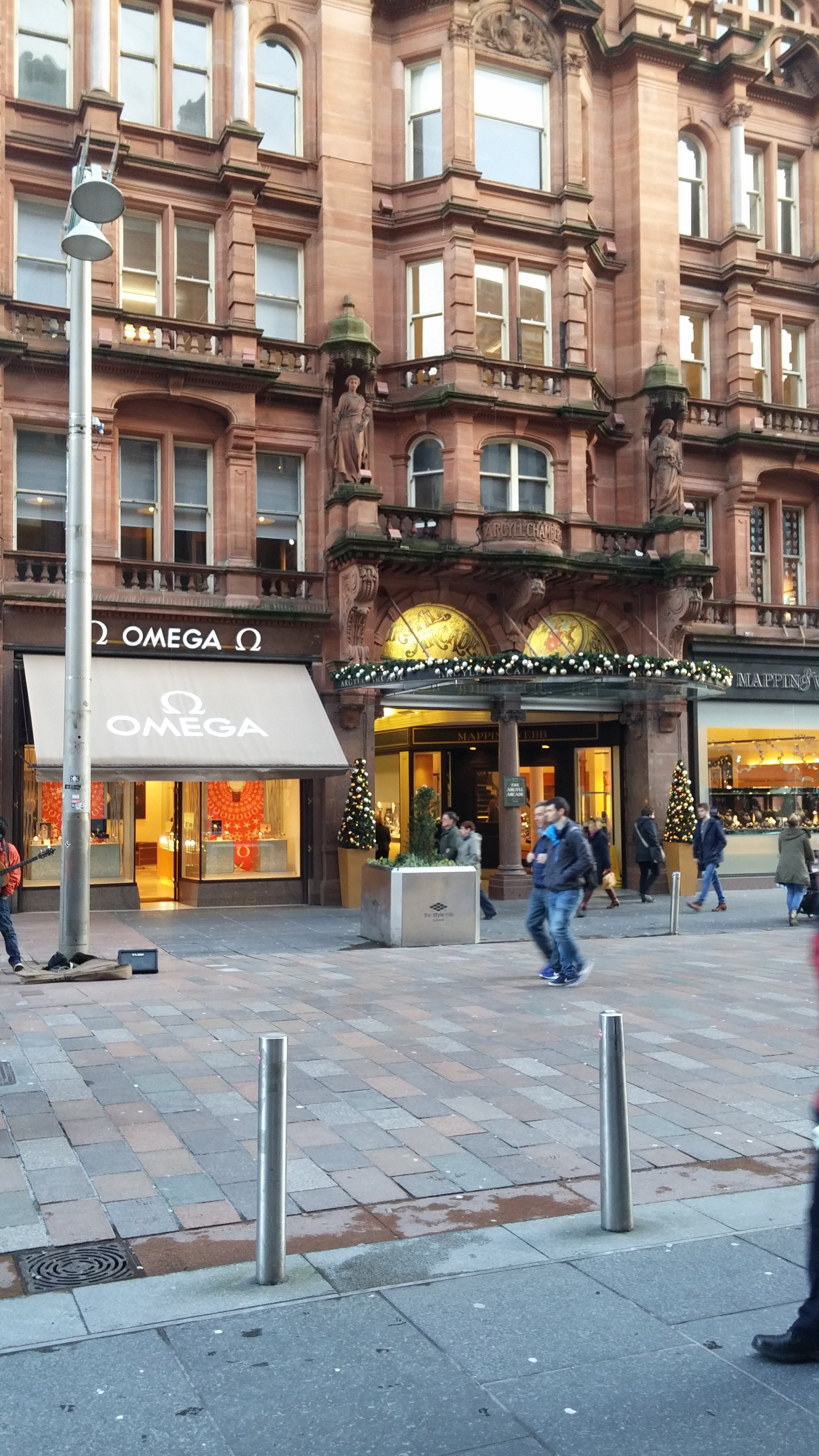
Argyll Arcade from the outside in 2015

Later in 1828, Baird was appointed by an organisation called the Merchants' House to work together with David Hamilton in figuring out and devising the layout of the Necropolis which is Glasgow's finest cemetery, but their plans were put aside and he was, not long after that, relegated as an advisor in approving George Milne as its eventual designer.

In 1836, Baird took on his first apprentice, Alexander Thomson, who then became his assistant until 1849 when he went into partnership with a second John Baird, Alexander's brother-in-law, not related to Baird.

In 1840, Baird designed generous business premises for Sir James Campbell on Buchanan Street, known as the Prince's Buildings. Campbell then hired him to design his warehouse that sits on the corner of Ingram and Brunswick Streets and then the elevations were drawn up by the author of "Baronial and Ecclesiastical Antiquities of Scotland.", Mr Billings. He designed the simple Princes Square which has since been re-designed and upgraded.

One of Baird's largest architecture projects would have been his Jacobean design for the new University of Glasgow building that was to be built on Woodlands Hill which is right by Kelvingrove Park. However, the plans were abandoned after the land was bought to build Park Terrace and Circus. The design for this was shown at the International Exhibition of 1862. Later the University decided to move their College buildings to Gilmorehill and they used Baird for the design of the buildings.

Early in 1853 he was accounted for the design of the pink granite sarcophagus for James Ewing of Strathleven in the Necropolis, an eye capturing work of art, which featured four bronze relief panels by Mossman.

In Baird's later life his knowledge of different kinds of properties allowed him to also work as a property valuator. He was known for his attention to detail and he was honest in his opinions.

== Personal life ==
Baird married Janet McKean from Bonhill, in 1837 and he had two daughters Flora, in 1838 and Agnes in 1841. He was a freemason, attending Lodge Glasgow St John. His appearance and character is described by a portrait of him by Daniel Macnee, now in Glasgow Art Gallery. It pictures Gildard's description of him as 'a large well-built man' who 'had a presence of one that ought to be in authority'. The portrait was reproduced in Memoirs and Portraits of One Hundred Glasgow Men by James MacLehose in 1886.

== Architectural work ==
The table below shows the principal projects which Baird designed or worked on. Some of these he worked as part of a team on and others were only minor additions.

| Date Started | Name of Building | Location |
|---|---|---|
| 1820 | Greyfriars UP Church | Glasgow, Scotland |
| 1823 | St Thomas Wesleyan Methodist Church | Glasgow, Scotland |
| 1825 | UP Church, Wellington Street | Blythswood, Glasgow, Scotland |
| 1826 | Oakshaw Street UP Church | Paisley, Renfrewshire, Scotland |
| 1828 | Argyle Arcade | Glasgow, Scotland |
| 1830 | Layout of the lands of South Woodside and Clairmont | Woodlands Hill, Glasgow, Scotland |
| 1831 | Glasgow Necropolis | Dennistoun, Glasgow, Scotland |
| 1831 | Woodside Crescent | Woodlands Hill, Glasgow, Scotland |
| 1833 | Cambridge UP Church | Glasgow, Scotland |
| 1833 | Clober House | New Kilpatrick, Dunbartonshire, Scotland |
| 1833 | Highland Parish Church | Campbeltown, Argyll, Scotland |
| 1833 | Terraced houses, Athol Place, Bath Street | Glasgow, Scotland |
| 1833 | West of Scotland Agricultural College | Glasgow, Scotland |
| 1834 | Union Church | Greenock, Scotland |
| 1835 | Bonhill Parish Church | Bonhill, Scotland |
| 1835 | Woodside Terrace | Glasgow, Scotland |
| 1837 | Caledonia Place | Glasgow. Scotland |
| 1838 | Woodside Place | Glasgow, Scotland |
| 1838 | Anderston UP Church | Glasgow, Scotland |
| 1839 | George Square Congregational Church | Greenock, Scotland |
| 1839 | Park of Drumquhassle | Drymen, Scotland |
| 1840 | 169 Elderslie Street | Glasgow, Scotland |
| 1840 | 2-4 Clifton Street | Glasgow, Street |
| 1840 | National Bank of Scotland, Airdrie Branch | Airdrie, Scotland |
| 1840 | Somerset Place | Glasgow, Scotland |
| 1840 | Erskine UP Church | Glasgow, Scotland |
| 1840 | Viewpark House | Uddingston, Scotland |
| 1841 | Cairnhill House | Airdrie, Scotland |
| 1841 | Congregational Church, Dunfermline | Dunfermline, Scotland |
| 1841 | National Bank of Scotland, Glasgow Branch | Glasgow, Scotland |
| 1842 | Claremont House | Glasgow, Scotland |
| 1842 | Claremont Terrace an Beresford House | Woodlands, Scotland |
| 1844 | Stonebyres House | Lesmahagow, Scotland |
| 1845 | Lynedoch Place and Lynedoch Crescent | Glasgow, Scotland |
| 1847 | University of Glasgow (proposed new college) | Woodlands, Scotland |
| 1847 | Wellington Street UP Church, mural monument to John Mitchell | Glasgow, Scotland |
| 1849 | 1-17 Woodlands Terrace | Woodlands, Scotland |
| 1850 | UP Church, Shamrock Street | Glasgow, Scotland |
| 1851 | 64 Buchanan Street | Glasgow, Scotland |
| 1851 | Macdonald's Muslin Warehouse | Glasgow, Scotland |
| 1851 | Premises of Messrs Wilson, Kay & Co | Glasgow, Scotland |
| 1852 | House in St Vincent Street | Glasgow, Scotland |
| 1853 | James Ewing Monument | Glasgow, Scotland |
| 1853 | Church School | Campbeltown, Scotland |
| 1854 | Houses in Hope Street and West George Street | Glasgow, Scotland |
| 1854 | Prince of Wales' Buildings | Glasgow, Scotland |
| 1854 | Sir James Campbell's Warehouse | Glasgow, Scotland |
| 1854 | Tobacco Warehouse, James Watt Street | Glasgow, Scotland |
| 1855 | Carbeth Guthrie House | Stirlingshire, Scotland |
| 1855 | Gardner's Warehouse | Glasgow, Scotland |
| 1855 | Urie House | Fetteresso, Scotland |
| 1856 | Smith and Sons' Warehouse | Glasgow, Scotland |
| 1857 | Birkwood House | Lesmahagow, Scotland |
| 1858 | Crown Circus | Glasgow, Scotland |
| 1859 | Commercial Building on 138-140 West George Street | Glasgow, Scotland |
| 1859 | Gartsherrie Offices | Glasgow, Scotland |

== Death ==
Baird died peacefully at home in Westfield, Partick on 18 December 1859 and was buried in Glasgow Necropolis. From 1855 he had suffered from a chronic brain disease which then resulted in his death four years later. Some time before his death he took on a partner, James Thomson to help him carry out his business until the illness took over. James carried on the business as Baird & Thomson with his sons and his successors until the 1940s. Most of the work during his sickness period is thought to be that of James Thomson. His wife outlived him and died on 24 April 1887.
