= St Mungo's Academy =

St. Mungo's Academy

Location
- 235 Crownpoint Road; Glasgow, G40 2RA; Scotland; 55.8541°N 4.2207°W

Information
- Type: Comprehensive secondary school
- Motto: Bringing Out The Best; Nil Sine Labore ("Nothing without labour")
- Religious affiliation: Catholic
- Established: 1858
- Head teacher: Megan Gardner
- Gender: Coeducational
- Age: 12 to 18
- Enrolment: 1,000
- Website: http://www.st-mungosacademy.glasgow.sch.uk

St Mungo's Academy is a Roman Catholic, co-educational, comprehensive, secondary school located in Gallowgate, Glasgow. The school was founded in 1858 by the Marist Brothers religious order.

The debate team at St Mungo's were the first Scottish team to represent the UK at the World Parliamentary Debate Competition, which they won. They were congratulated by First Minister Nicola Sturgeon.

== History ==
=== The founding ===
St Mungo's Academy was founded by the Marist Brothers in 1858 at 96 Garngad Hill, Glasgow to educate poor Catholic boys, largely Irish immigrants or their children. The school was named for the patron saint of Glasgow, Saint Mungo, and had ambitions to create a Catholic professional class by educating the boys to secondary level and prepare them for university studies. Some of its students pursued entering priesthood or other religious orders.

Marist Brothers played a large role in shaping the educational and social life of the Catholic residents of Glasgow in the second half of the 19th and the beginning of the 20th century. In addition to founding St.Mungo's Academy they were active in the running and staffing of the primary schools of St. Mungo's, St. Alphonsus', St Patrick's, St Mary's and the Sacred Heart as well as the Junior Secondary schools of St. Mark's and St. Mary's. A Marist Brother, Brother Walfrid, also founded Celtic F.C. in 1888.

=== 1860–1949 ===
After only two and half years the school moved to St. Mungo Street, Townhead, and in 1883 overcrowding led the school to move again, this time to Parson Street also in Townhead where it remained until 1973. In the wake of the Education Act 1918 the demand for admission to the school surged. In 1919 the school was absorbed into the state system, while retaining its Roman Catholic character under the running of the Marist Brothers.

The school roll increased from 350 to 580 and within 10 years stood at 1,147. With access to the school opening up, more lay teachers were recruited. These included the brothers Colm and Willie Brogan. Until the 1930s many boys who attended the school came from beyond Glasgow. Pupils travelled daily from Lanarkshire, Renfrewshire, Stirlingshire, Ayrshire and Dunbartonshire due to the lack of Catholic secondary schools in these parts.

During these years the school population also reflected a migration into the city from the Highlands, Italy and after the Second World War, Poland. During this period former pupils began to return to the school to teach.

In 1923 the school motto 'Nil sine labore' was included in the new badge. The motto came from two lines in one of Horace's Satires 'Nil sine magno, Vita labore dedit mortalibus'. The motto means Nothing without work. As a result of the increasing numbers of pupils a new annex, St. Kentigern's (formerly Alexander's School) in Duke Street, was purchased. St. Mungo's Academy was transferred to Glasgow Corporation in 1918 and nominal fees were abolished in 1928. Before the Second World War St. Mungo's was not a neighbourhood school but a selective one with a highly competitive entrance exam.

According to at least 108 former pupils were killed during World War II. One of those, John Gerard Woods, was posthumously awarded the MC in 1945 for gallant and distinguished service in Burma. Most of the school's casualties saw service in the RAF. There is a war memorial located in the school.

=== 1950–1998 ===
Further increases of the school population in the early 1950s required the use of additional annexes, including, directly across the road, Barony Street (the former Martyrs' Public School, designed by Charles Rennie Mackintosh), Kennedy Street Primary School (built in 1875) which was shared with the City Public School, and Rigby Street in Carntyne which in 1954 housed two "prep" (preparatory) classes and two first year and two-second year classes, under the local headship of Mr. Sweeney. Brother Clare (the historian James E. Handley) was the overall headmaster of the academy at this time. The Rigby Street annex was later used by St. Gregory's Secondary Cranhill.

During the late 1960s the Secretary of State for Scotland, William Ross, mandated changes to Scottish secondary education. Glasgow Corporation was committed to this system of rigid catchment areas using existing and planned new facilities. As a result, in 1967 St. Mungo's Academy was facing a future without a catchment area as soon as four new Catholic secondary schools would be completed to service its districts. In addition, the school lacked facilities and was overcrowded.

Despite these changes the school headmaster, Brother Kenneth, still contended that the school had a role to play and wished to continue its selective recruitment policy to create a centre of excellence for providing Catholic community leaders. At this time Catholics tended to occupy the lower half of the class group in Glasgow.

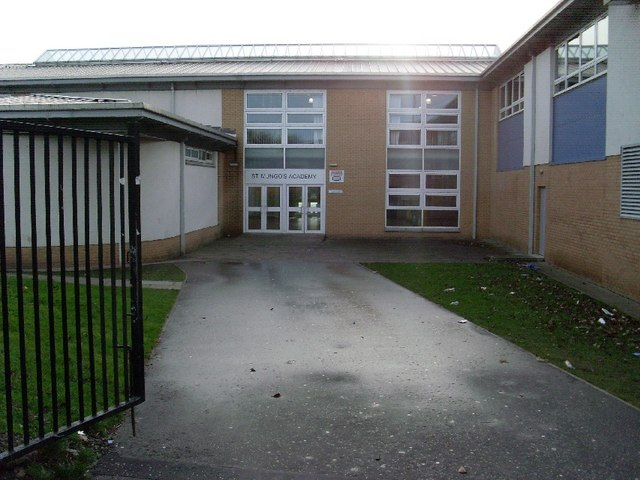
Entrance to the current school site building

In 1973 the buildings in Parson Street were declared unsafe and work began on the new school in Crownpoint Road. The next year part of the buildings in Parson Street were demolished, though some still remain. Old school registers were destroyed in a fire in December 1975. The school rehoused to new premises in Hanson Street part of the Central College of Commerce for a short period before the move to the newly built school in Crownpoint Road, Gallowgate, in 1976. At this time St Mungo's Academy was still a boys school run by the Marist Brothers but over the following years the Brothers moved to other work and, by 1988, when the first girls arrived from Our Lady and St Francis Secondary School, the Brothers had passed control of the school to lay staff. By 1989, the school was a comprehensive, co-educational state Roman Catholic school, still called St Mungo's Academy with equal numbers of boys and girls.

=== 1999–present ===
Since August 1999 the school has been part of an education pilot project in which it works very closely with its associated primary schools, some nursery schools and other agencies such as Health, Social Work, Careers and Psychological services. It is known as the St Mungo Learning Community and has considerable autonomy with a devolved budget to organise its own affairs. The aim is to reduce administration in individual schools, leaving more time for teaching and learning and work with other agencies in addressing pupils' needs. In October 2001 staff and pupils transferred to a new purpose-built school. In 2005, the school comprised 29 general classrooms, 7 dedicated ICT teaching areas, 10 science labs, 4 technical rooms, 4 art and design rooms, 3 home economics rooms, 3 music rooms, 2 gymnasia, a drama studio, a games hall, and a purpose-built oratory. Physical education facilities include 4 indoor areas and a new all-weather sports pitch, all used extensively by the local community.

The 150th anniversary of the founding of St. Mungo's Academy was celebrated in April 2008 at a dinner in a Glasgow hotel. Pride of place at the dinner went to the then 100-year-old Alasdair McCann, a Govan native, living in Galway. An icon of Saint Marcellin Champagnat, founder of the Marist Brothers was unveiled at a celebratory mass, at St Mungo's Church, Townhead, in June 2008.

In 2012, The Mungo Boys, a play based on the reunion of six, former St Mungo's Academy boys, meeting again 40 years after they left the school in 1968 played at the Edinburgh Fringe Festival. The play was described as "a funny but gentle heart-warming record of youthful naivety, hope and optimism; a story of six pals who, to paraphrase the school motto, achieved nothing without work – but never lost the dream."

== Sports ==
Athletics, rugby union and football were the main sports pursued by the school. The athletics team participated in both track and field and cross country city and national competitions, often with success.

The rugby teams were established in 1934-5 and operated in the years before national schools competitions in Scotland. The teams played a series of matches each season against other rugby playing schools in the Greater Glasgow area. The football teams were the most successful school sports team and were a source of pride to both pupils and teachers. The school first XI won the Scottish Secondary Schools' Shield in 1915 at the first time of competing. As the school population grew other age group teams were established. Over the years the teams were successful in both Glasgow and District secondary schools' championships as well as in national championships. The last national title was won in 1990 in the Scottish Secondary Schools' Shield Under 18 Championship Final.

In total the school football teams have won 16 Scottish Schools Championships at all age grades. The football teams have also won 47 Glasgow School Championships and 18 Glasgow Cups.

=== Football championships ===
Competition	Under 18	Under 16	Under 15	Under 14	Under 13	Total
Scottish Secondary Schools' Shield	10	3	3	0	0	16
Glasgow Schools League Champions	21	4	10	9	3	47
Glasgow Schools Cups	14	2	6	4	2	28
Total	45	9	19	13	5	91

== Notable former pupils ==
- James Allan (musician), lead singer and guitarist of the Scottish rock band Glasvegas
- Joe Moretti, guitarist
- Roderick Macdonald, Lord Uist is a Senator of the College of Justice in Edinburgh
- James Scanlan, Archbishop of Glasgow
- Maurice Brennan, aerospace engineer

Football

- Tommy Burns 1973–89 Celtic manager 1994–97
- John McPhail, Celtic 1941–56
- Joe Miller, Celtic 1987–93

Sport

- Nicola Glencross, professional wrestler currently signed to WWE
- Paige Stirling, professional wrestler currently signed to WWE

In 1876 the first Former Pupils' reunion was held and in 1884 the Former Pupils' Association was formed to encourage pupils to keep a connection with the school after they had left and to create and fund bursaries for the pupils of the school. The association still exists today and meets in the academy on the first Saturday of each month. The Former Pupils football team plays in the Caledonian Amateur Football League.
