= Architecture of Scotland =

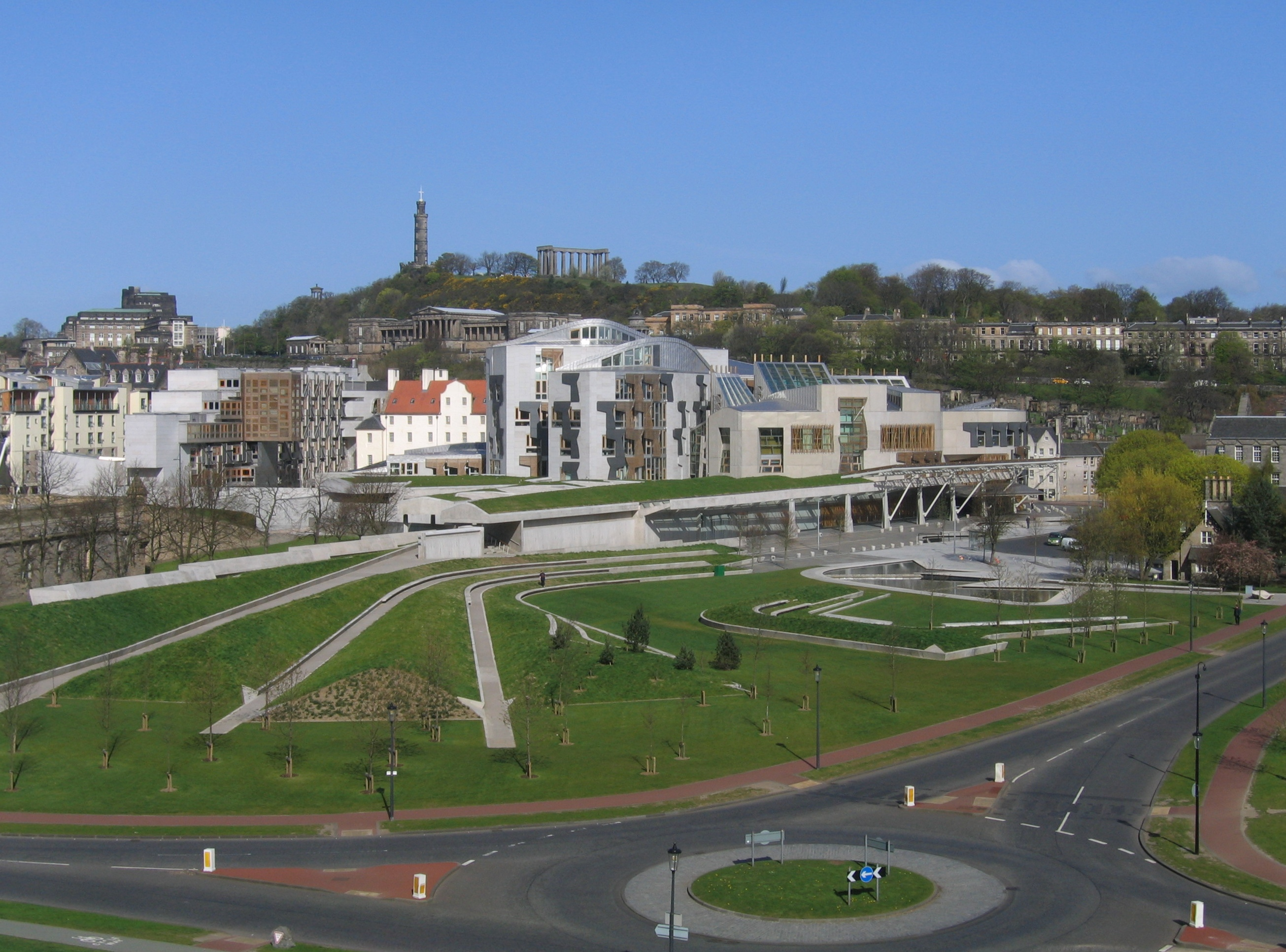
The Scottish Parliament Building at Holyrood designed by the Catalan architect Enric Miralles and opened in October 2004.

The architecture of Scotland includes all human building within the modern borders of Scotland, from the Neolithic era to the present day. The earliest surviving houses go back around 9500 years, and the first villages 6000 years: Skara Brae on the Mainland of Orkney being the earliest preserved example in Europe. Crannogs, roundhouses, each built on an artificial island, date from the Bronze Age and stone buildings called Atlantic roundhouses and larger earthwork hill forts from the Iron Age. The arrival of the Romans from about 71 AD led to the creation of forts like that at Trimontium, and a continuous fortification between the Firth of Forth and the Firth of Clyde known as the Antonine Wall, built in the second century AD. Beyond Roman influence, there is evidence of wheelhouses and underground souterrains. After the departure of the Romans there were a series of nucleated hill forts, often utilising major geographical features, as at Dunadd and Dunbarton.

Castles arrived in Scotland with the introduction of feudalism in the twelfth century. Initially these were wooden motte-and-bailey constructions, but many were replaced by stone castles with a high curtain wall. In the late Middle Ages new castles were built, some on a grander scale, and others, particularly in the borders, simpler tower houses. Gunpowder weaponry led to the use of gun ports, platforms to mount guns and walls adapted to resist bombardment. Medieval parish church architecture was typically simpler than in England, but there were grander ecclesiastical buildings in the Gothic style. From the early fifteenth century the introduction of Renaissance styles included the selective use of Romanesque forms in church architecture, as in the nave of Dunkeld Cathedral, followed more directly influenced Renaissance palace building from the late fifteenth century, beginning at Linlithgow. The private houses of aristocrats adopted some of these features and incorporated features of Medieval castles and tower houses into plans based on the French Château to produce the Scots Baronial style. From about 1560, the Reformation led to the widespread destruction of church furnishings, ornaments and decoration and in post-Reformation period a unique form of church emerged based on the T-shaped plan.

After the Restoration in 1660, there was a fashion for grand private houses influenced by the Palladian style and associated with the architects Sir William Bruce and James Smith. Scotland produced some of the most significant British architects of the eighteenth century, including: Colen Campbell, James Gibbs, William Chambers and particularly Robert Adam. They looked to classical models and Edinburgh's New Town was the focus of a classical building boom. The Industrial Revolution transformed Scottish towns, leading to urban sprawl, exemplified by tenements like those of the Gorbals in Glasgow. New towns, of designed communities like New Lanark, developed from 1800 by Robert Owen, were one solution. Sociologist Patrick Geddes (1854–1932) preferred "conservative surgery": retaining the best buildings in an area and removing the worst. There was a revival of the baronial style, particularly after the rebuilding of Abbotsford House for Walter Scott from 1816, and a parallel revival of the Gothic in church architecture. Neoclassicism was pursued by William Henry Playfair, Alexander "Greek" Thomson and David Rhind. The late nineteenth century saw some major engineering projects including the Forth Bridge, a cantilever bridge and one of the first major all steel constructions in the world.

The most significant Scottish architect of the early twentieth century, Charles Rennie Mackintosh, developed a unique and internationally influential "Glasgow style". Architects who continued to employ styles informed by the past included James Robert Rhind and James Miller. From the mid-twentieth century, architecture in Scotland became increasingly utilitarian and influenced by modernism. Key Scottish architects in this movement included Thomas S. Tait, James Stirling and James Gowan. The introduction of brutalism led to urban clearances and extensive use of the tower block. The style was also used in new towns like Glenrothes and Cumbernauld, but has received considerable criticism. More recent major architectural projects include the Scottish Exhibition and Conference Centre, Glasgow, the many striking modern buildings along the side of the River Clyde and the Scottish Parliament Building in Edinburgh.

== Prehistoric era ==
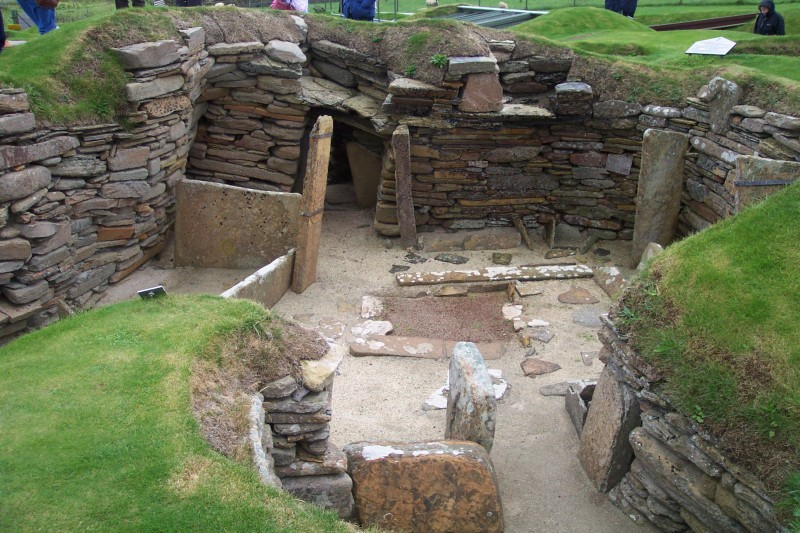
Skara Brae, a Neolithic settlement, located in the Bay of Skaill, Orkney.

Groups of settlers began building the first known permanent houses on what is now Scottish soil around 9500 years ago, and the first villages around 6000 years ago. The stone building at Knap of Howar at Papa Westray, Orkney is one of the oldest surviving houses in north-west Europe, making use of locally gathered rubble in a dry-stone construction. Skara Brae on the Mainland of Orkney also dates from this period and is Europe's most complete Neolithic village. Neolithic habitation, burial and ritual sites are particularly common and well-preserved in the Northern Isles and Western Isles, where a lack of trees led to most structures being built of local stone. From the Early and Middle Bronze Age we have evidence of the occupation of crannogs, roundhouses partially or entirely built on an artificial island, usually in lakes, rivers and estuarine waters. The peoples of early Iron Age Scotland, particularly in the north and west, lived in substantial stone buildings called Atlantic roundhouses. The remains of hundreds of these houses exist throughout the country, some merely piles of rubble, others with impressive towers and outbuildings. They date from about 800 BC to AD 300 with the most imposing structures having been created circa 200–100 BC. In the south and east larger earthwork hill forts survive. There is evidence for about 1,000 Iron Age hillforts in Scotland, most located below the Clyde-Forth line. They appear to have been largely abandoned in the Roman period, but some seem to have been reoccupied after their departure. Most are circular, with a single palisade around an enclosure.

== Roman and post-Roman constructions ==
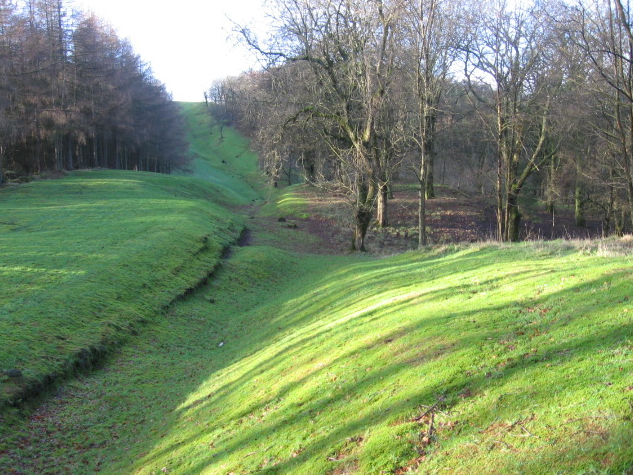
The course of the Antonine Wall, at Bar Hill

The Romans began military expeditions into what is now Scotland from about 71 AD. In the summer of AD 78 Gnaeus Julius Agricola arrived in Britain to take up his appointment as the new governor and began a series of expeditions to Scotland. Two years later his legions constructed a substantial fort at Trimontium near Melrose. He is said to have pushed his armies to the estuary of the "River Taus" (usually assumed to be the River Tay) and established forts there, including a legionary fortress at Inchtuthil. Agricola's successors were unable or unwilling to further subdue the far north. The fortress at Inchtuthil was dismantled before its completion and the other fortifications of the Gask Ridge were abandoned within the space of a few years. By AD 87 the occupation was limited to the Southern Uplands and by the end of the first century the northern limit of Roman expansion was a line drawn between the Tyne and Solway Firth. Elginhaugh fort, in Midlothian, dates to about this period as may Castle Greg in West Lothian. The Romans eventually withdrew to a line in what is now northern England, building the fortification known as Hadrian's Wall from coast to coast. Around 141 A.D. the Romans undertook a reoccupation of southern Scotland, moving up to construct a new limes between the Firth of Forth and the Firth of Clyde. The Antonine Wall is the largest Roman construction inside Scotland. It is a sward-covered wall made of turf circa 7 metres (20 ft) high, with nineteen forts. It extended for 60 km (37 mi). Having taken twelve years to build, the wall was overrun and abandoned soon after AD 160. The Romans retreated to the line of Hadrian's Wall, with occasional expeditions that involved the building and reoccupation of forts, until their departure in the fifth century.

Beyond the area of Roman occupation, wheelhouses, a round house with a characteristic outer wall within which a circle of stone piers (bearing a resemblance to the spokes of a wheel) were constructed, with over sixty sites identified in the west and north. Over 400 souterrains, small underground constructions, have been discovered in Scotland, many of them in the south-east, and although few have been dated those that have suggest a construction date in the 2nd or 3rd centuries AD. They are usually found close to settlements (whose timber frames are much less well-preserved) and may have been for storing perishable agricultural products. After the departure of the Romans we have evidence of a series of forts, often smaller "nucleated" constructions compared with Iron Age constructions, sometimes utilising major geographical features, as at Dunadd and Dumbarton.

== Middle Ages ==
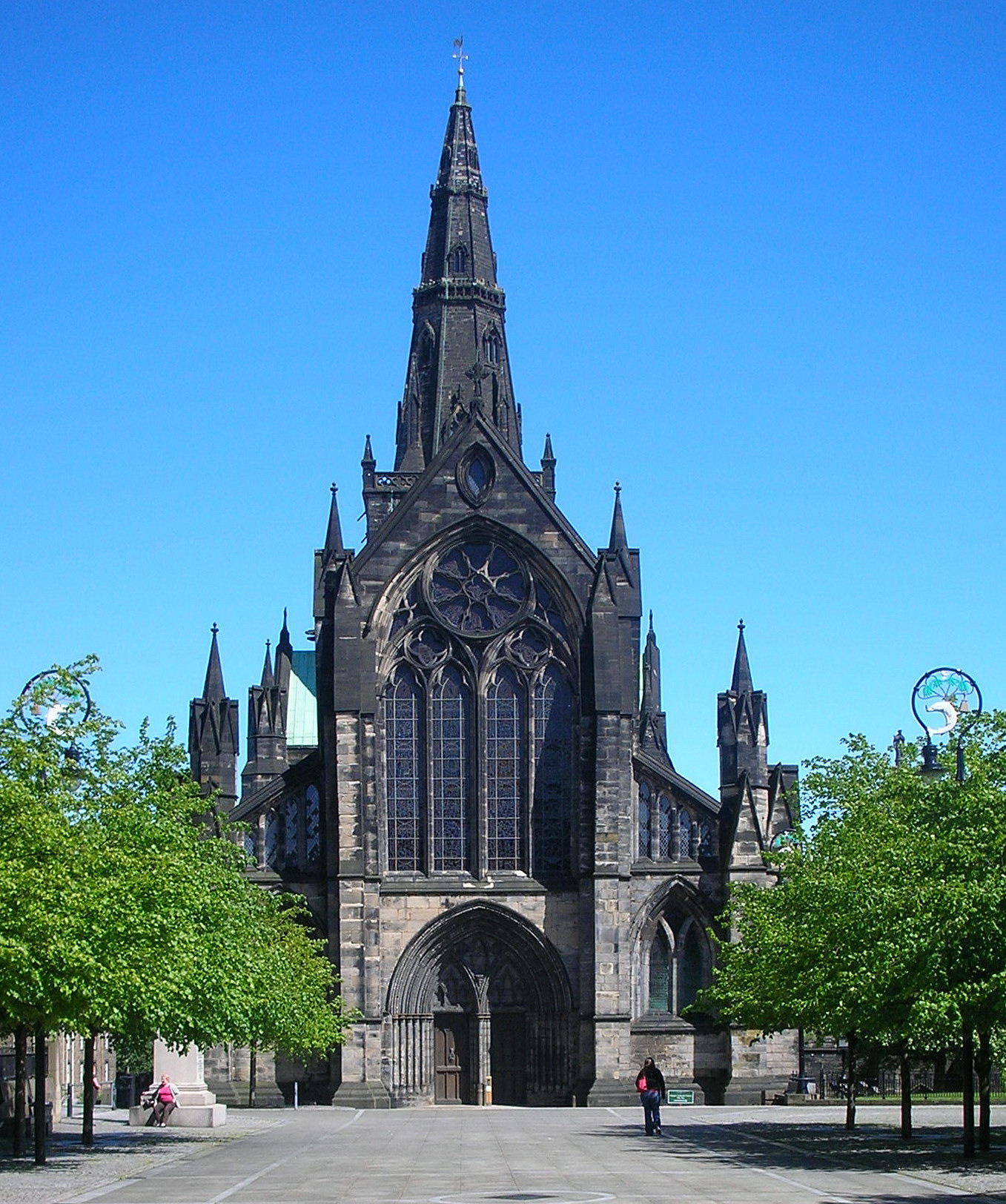
The front of Glasgow Cathedral, considered one of the finest Gothic buildings in Scotland.

Medieval vernacular architecture made use of local materials and styles. As in England, cruck construction was used, employing pairs of curved timbers to support the roof, however they were usually hidden from view. In rural areas there was extensive use of turf to fill in the walls, sometimes on a stone base, but they were not long lasting and had to be rebuilt perhaps as often as every two or three years. In some regions, including the south-west and around Dundee, solid clay walls were used, or combinations of clay, turf and stray, rendered with clay or lime to make them weatherproof. With a lack of long span structural timber, the most common building material was stone, employed in both mortared and dry stone construction. Different regions used broom, heather, straw, turfs or reeds for roofing.

The introduction of Christianity into Scotland from Ireland, from the sixth century, led to the construction of basic masonry-built churches beginning on the west coast and islands. Medieval parish church architecture in Scotland was typically much less elaborate than in England, with many churches remaining simple oblongs, without transepts and aisles, and often without towers. In the Highlands they were often even simpler, many built of rubble masonry and sometimes indistinguishable from the outside from houses or farm buildings. However, from the eighth century, more sophisticated buildings emerged. Early Romanesque ashlar masonry produced block-built stone buildings, like the eleventh century round tower at Brechin Cathedral and the square towers of Dunblane Cathedral and The Church of St Rule. After the eleventh century, as masonry techniques advanced, ashlar blocks became more rectangular, resulting in structurally more stable walls that could incorporate more refined architectural moulding and detailing that can be seen in corbelling, buttressing, lintels and arching. At the same time there was increasing influences from English and continental European designs, such as the Romanesque chevron pattern detailing on the piers in the nave of Dunfermline Abbey (1130–40), which were modelled on details from Durham Cathedral, and the thirteenth century East-end of Elgin Cathedral, which incorporated typical European Gothic mouldings and tracery. In the fifteenth century continental builders are known to have been working in Scotland. French master-mason John Morrow was employed at the building of Glasgow Cathedral and the rebuilding of Melrose Abbey, both considered fine examples of Gothic architecture. The interiors of churches were often elaborate before the Reformation, with highly decorated sacrament houses, like the ones surviving at Deskford and Kinkell. The carvings at Rosslyn Chapel, created in the mid-fifteenth century, elaborately depicting the progression of the seven deadly sins, are considered some of the finest in the Gothic style. Late Medieval Scottish churches also often contained elaborate burial monuments, like the Douglas tombs in the town of Douglas. The early sixteenth century saw crown steeples built on churches with royal connections, symbolising imperial monarchy, as at St. Giles Cathedral, Edinburgh.

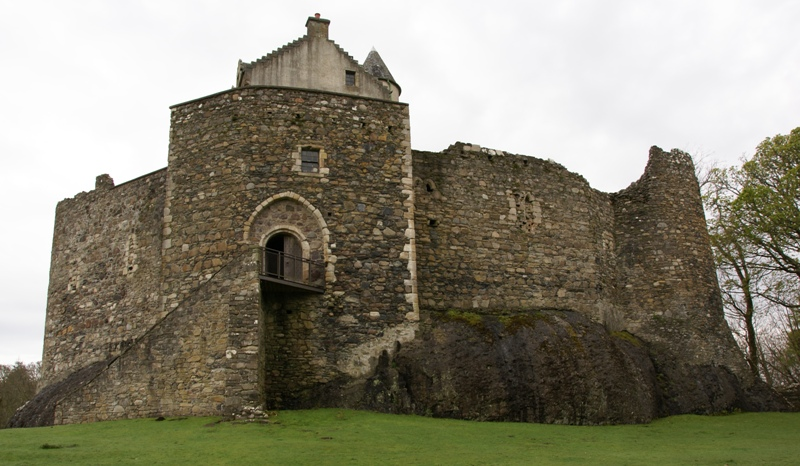
Dunstaffnage Castle, one of the oldest surviving "castles of enceinte", mostly dating from the thirteenth century

Scotland is known for its dramatically placed castles, many of which date from the late medieval era. Castles, in the sense of a fortified residence of a lord or noble, arrived in Scotland as part of David I's encouragement of Norman and French nobles to settle with feudal tenures, particularly in the south and east, and were a way of controlling the contested lowlands. These were primarily wooden motte-and-bailey constructions, of a raised mount or motte, surmounted by a wooden tower and a larger adjacent enclosure or bailey, both usually surrounded by a fosse (a ditch) and palisade, and connected by a wooden bridge. They varied in size from the very large such as the Bass of Inverurie, to more modest designs like Balmaclellan. In England many of these constructions were converted into stone "keep-and-bailey" castles in the twelfth century, but in Scotland most of those that were in continued occupation became stone castles of "enceinte", with a high embattled curtain wall. The need for thick and high walls for defence forced the use of economic building methods, often continuing the tradition of dry-stone rubble building, which were then covered with a lime render, or harled for weatherproofing and a uniform appearance. In addition to the baronial castles there were royal castles, often larger and providing defence, lodging for the itinerant Scottish court and a local administrative centre. By 1200 these included fortifications at Ayr and Berwick. In the wars of Scottish Independence Robert I adopted a policy of castle destruction, rather than allow fortresses to be easily retaken and then held by the English, beginning with his own castles at Ayr and Dumfries, and including Roxburgh and Edinburgh.

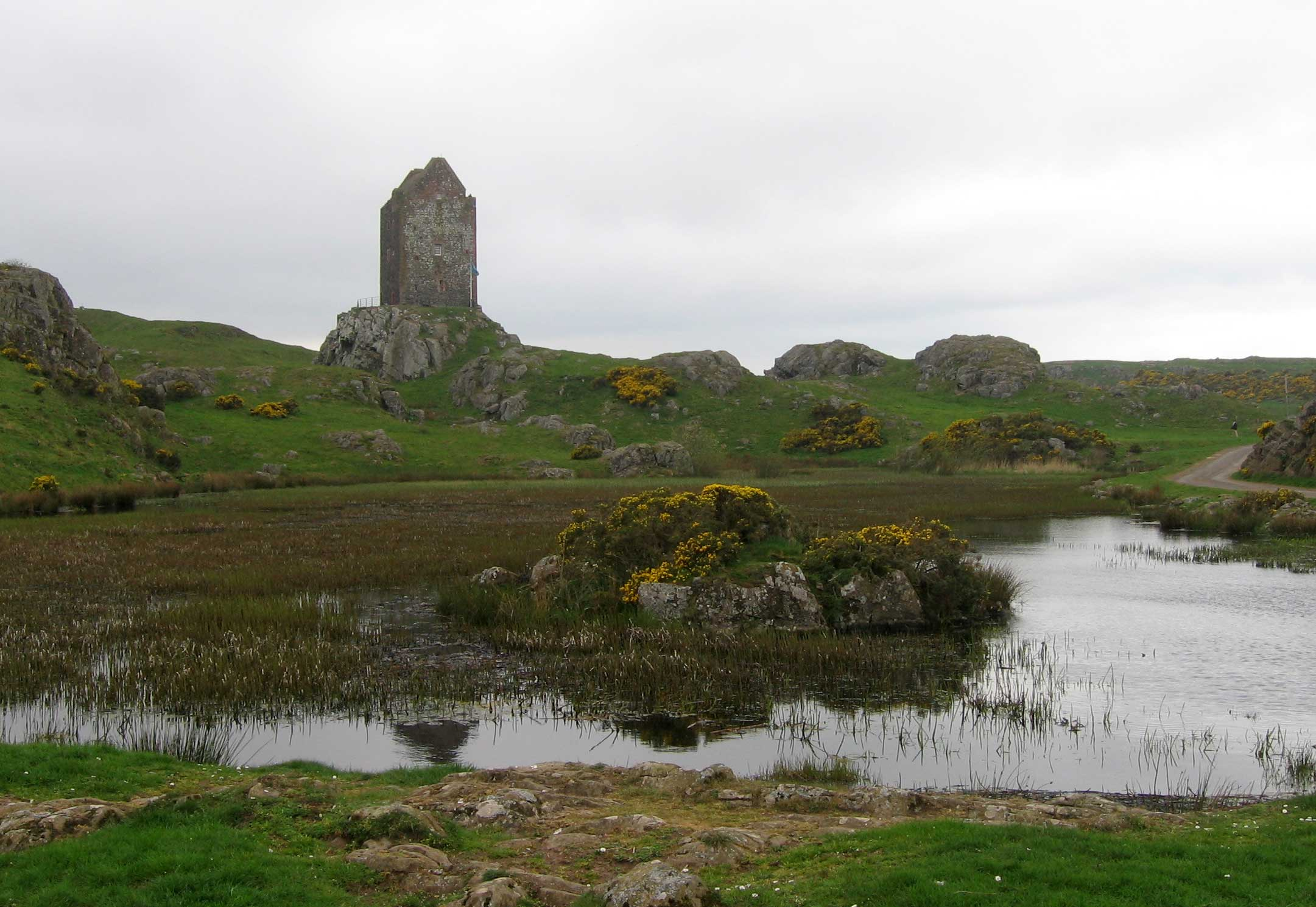
Smailholm Tower near Kelso in the Scottish Borders

After the Wars of Independence, new castles began to be built, often on a grander scale as "livery and maintenance" castles, to house retained troops, like Tantallon, Lothian and Doune near Stirling, rebuilt for Robert Stewart, Duke of Albany in the fourteenth century. The largest number of late medieval fortifications in Scotland built by nobles, about 800, were of the tower house design. Smaller versions of tower houses in southern Scotland were known as peel towers, or pele houses. The defences of tower houses were primarily aimed to provide protection against smaller raiding parties and were not intended to put up significant opposition to an organised military assault, leading historian Stuart Reid to characterise them as "defensible rather than defensive". They were typically a tall, square, stone-built, crenelated building; often also surrounded by a barmkin or bawn, a walled courtyard designed to hold valuable animals securely, but not necessarily intended for serious defence. They were built extensively on both sides of the border with England and James IV's forfeiture of the Lordship of the Isles in 1494 led to an immediate burst of castle building across the region. Gunpowder weaponry fundamentally altered the nature of castle architecture, with existing castles being adapted to allow the use of gunpowder weapons by the incorporation of "keyhole" gun ports, platforms to mount guns and walls being adapted to resist bombardment. Ravenscraig, Kirkcaldy, begun about 1460, is probably the first castle in the British Isles to be built as an Artillery fort, incorporating "D-shape" bastions that would better resist cannon fire and on which artillery could be mounted.

== Early modern ==
=== Renaissance ===
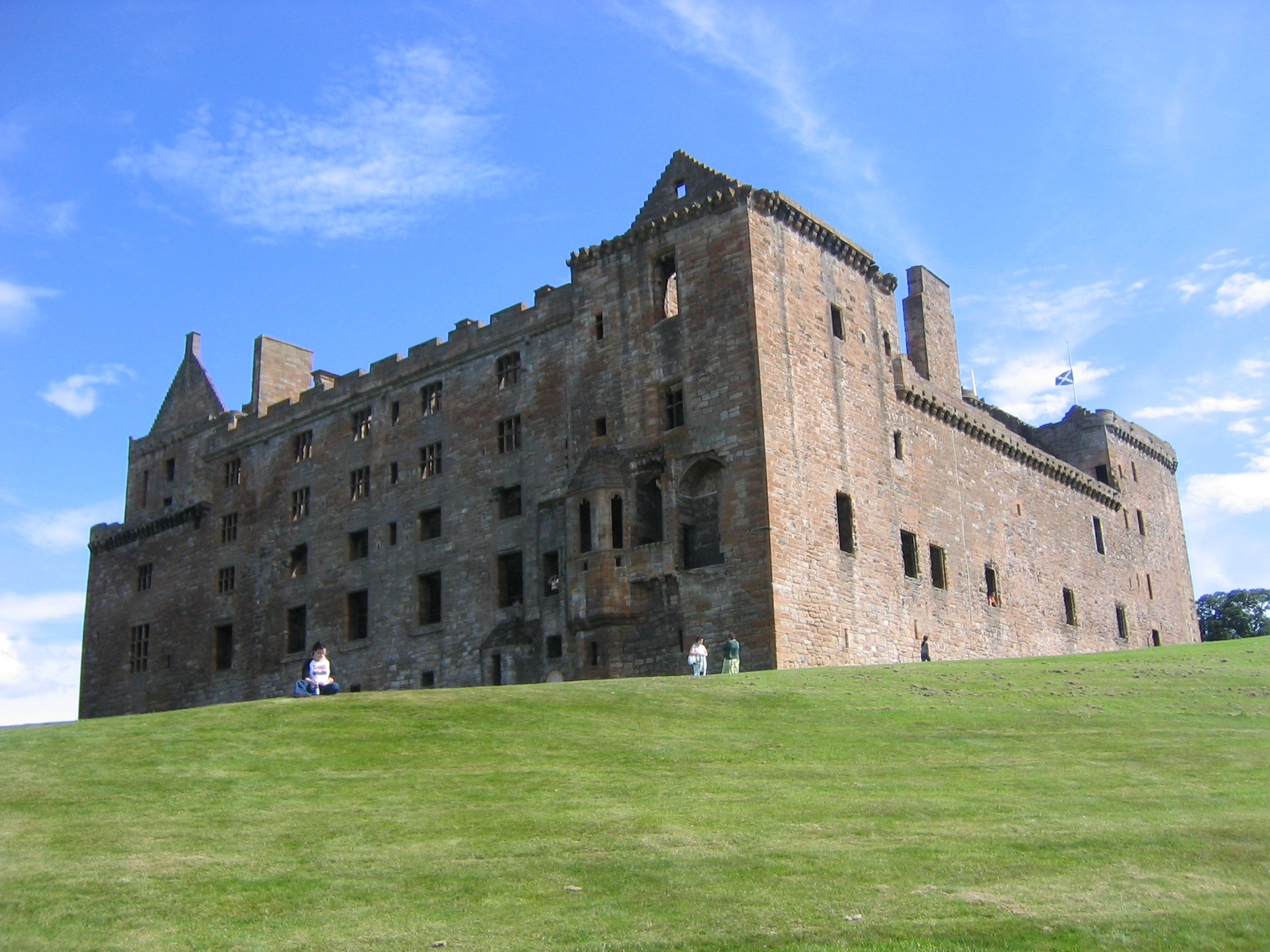
Linlithgow Palace, the first building to bear that title in Scotland, extensively rebuilt along Renaissance principles from the fifteenth century

The impact of the Renaissance on Scottish architecture has been seen as occurring in two distinct phases. First, from the early fifteenth century the selective use of Romanesque forms in church architecture, to be followed by a second phase of more directly influenced Renaissance palace building from the late fifteenth century. The re-adoption of low-massive church building with round arches and pillars, in contrast to the Gothic perpendicular style that was particularly dominant in England in the late Medieval era, may have been influenced by close contacts with Rome and the Netherlands, and may have been a conscious reaction to English forms in favour of continental ones. It can be seen in the nave of Dunkeld Cathedral, begun in 1406, the facade of St Mary's, Haddington from the 1460s and in the chapel of Bishop Elphinstone's Kings College, Aberdeen (1500–9). About forty collegiate churches were established in Scotland in late fifteenth and early sixteenth centuries. Many, like Trinity College, Edinburgh, showed a combination of Gothic and Renaissance styles.

The extensive building and rebuilding of royal palaces probably began under James III, accelerated under James IV, reaching its peak under James V. These works have been seen as directly reflecting the influence of Renaissance styles. Linlithgow was first constructed under James I, under the direction of master of work John de Waltoun and was referred to as a palace, apparently the first use of this term in the country, from 1429. This was extended under James III and began to correspond to a fashionable quadrangular, corner-towered Italian signorial palace of a palatium ad moden castri (a castle-style palace), combining classical symmetry with neo-chivalric imagery. There is evidence of Italian masons working for James IV, in whose reign Linlithgow was completed and other palaces were rebuilt with Italianate proportions. James V encountered the French version of Renaissance building while visiting for his marriage to Madeleine of Valois in 1536 and his second marriage to Mary of Guise may have resulted in longer term connections and influences. Work from his reign largely disregarded the insular style adopted in England under Henry VIII and adopted forms that were recognisably European, beginning with the extensive work at Linlithgow. This was followed by re-buildings at Holyrood, Falkland, Stirling and Edinburgh, described as "some of the finest examples of Renaissance architecture in Britain". Rather than slavishly copying continental forms, most Scottish architecture incorporated elements of these styles into traditional local patterns, adapting them to Scottish idioms and materials (particularly stone and harl). New military architecture in the trace Italienne style was brought by Italian military engineers during the war of the Rough Wooing and the regency of Mary of Guise including Migliorino Ubaldini who worked at Edinburgh Castle, Camillo Marini (died 1552) who designed forts, and Lorenzo Pomarelli who worked for Mary of Guise during the rebuilding of forts at Inchkeith and Eyemouth. Work undertaken for James VI demonstrated continued Renaissance influences, with the Chapel Royal at Stirling having a classical entrance built in 1594 and the North Wing of Linlithgow, built in 1618, using classical pediments. Similar themes can be seen in the private houses of aristocrats, as in Mar's Wark, Stirling (c. 1570) and Crichton Castle, built for the Earl of Bothwell in 1580s.

=== Reformation ===
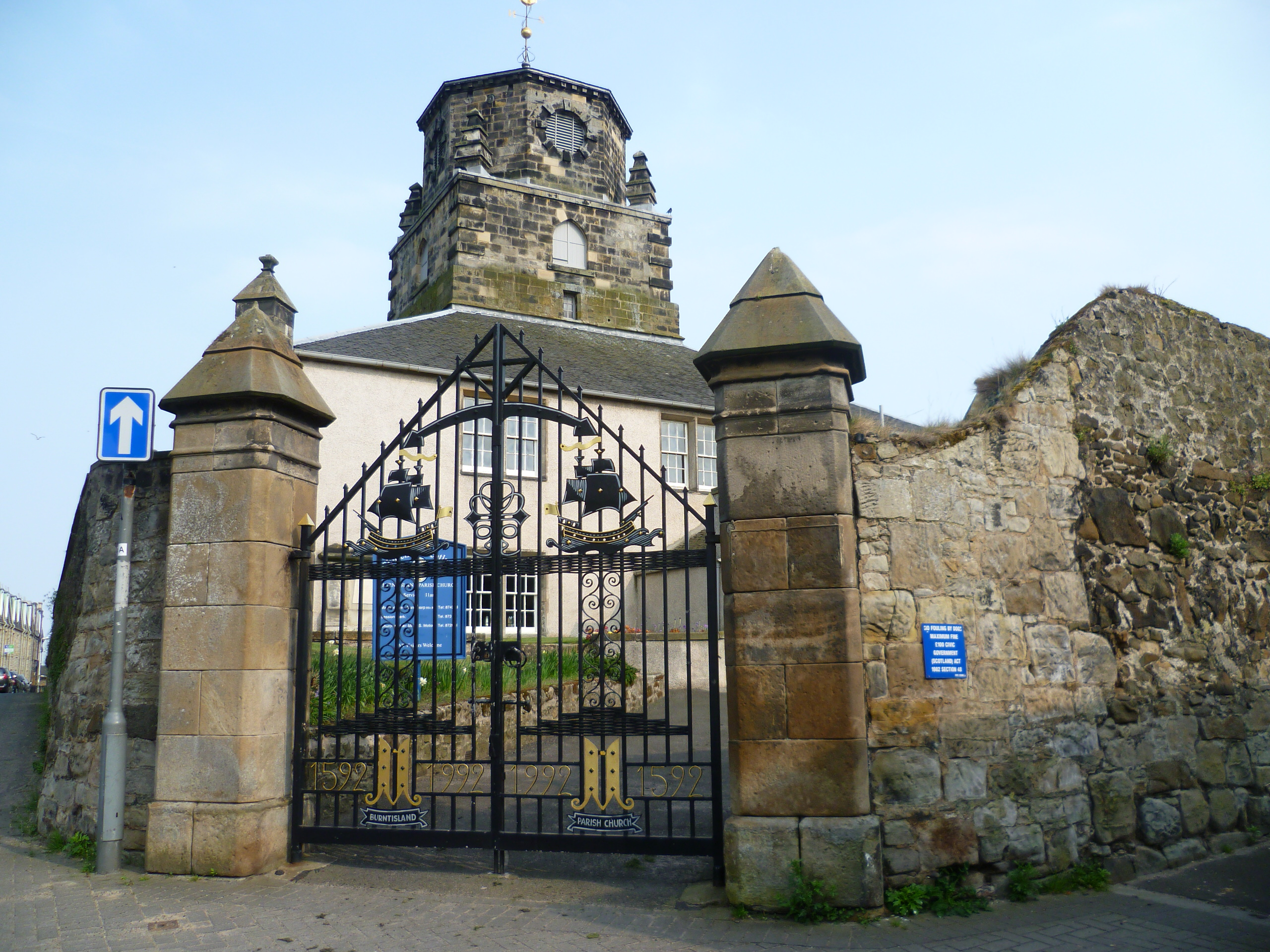
Burntisland Parish Kirk

From about 1560, the Reformation revolutionised church architecture in Scotland. Calvinists rejected ornamentation in places of worship, with no need for elaborate buildings divided up by ritual, resulting in the widespread destruction of Medieval church furnishings, ornaments and decoration. There was a need to adapt and build new churches suitable for reformed services, particularly putting the pulpit and preaching at the centre of worship. Many of the earliest buildings were simple gabled rectangles, a style that continued to be built into the seventeenth century, as at Dunnottar Castle in the 1580s, Greenock (1591) and Durness (1619), but often with windows on the south wall (and none on the north), which became a unique feature of Reformation kirks. There were continuities with pre-Reformation materials, with some churches using rubble, as at Kemback in Fife (1582). Others employed stone and a few added wooden steeples, as at Burntisland (1592). The church of Greyfriars, Edinburgh, built between 1602 and 1620, used a rectangular layout with a largely Gothic form, but that at Dirleton (1612), had a more sophisticated classical style. A variation of the rectangular church that developed in post-Reformation Scotland was the T-shaped plan, often used when adapting existing churches, which allowed the maximum number of parishioners to be near the pulpit. They can be seen at Kemback and Prestonpans after 1595. It continued to be used into the seventeenth century as at Weem (1600), Anstruther Easter, Fife (1634–44) and New Cumnock (1657). In the seventeenth century a Greek cross plan was used for churches such as Cawdor (1619) and Fenwick (1643). In most of these cases one arm of the cross would have been closed off as a laird's aisle, meaning that they were in effect T-plan churches.

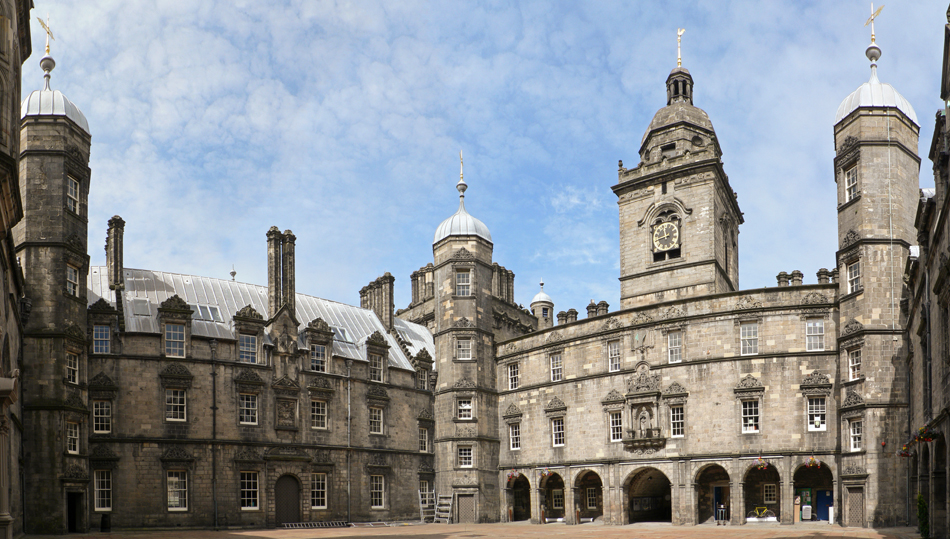
The seventeenth century quadrangle of Heriot's Hospital, Edinburgh, showing many of the key features of the Scots baronial style.

The unique style of great private house in Scotland, later known as Scots baronial, has been located in origin to the period of the 1560s. It kept many of the features of the high walled Medieval castles that had been largely made obsolete by gunpowder weapons and may have been influenced by the French masons brought to Scotland to work on royal palaces. It drew on the tower houses and peel towers, retaining many of their external features, but with a larger ground plan, classically a stone built "Z-plan" of a rectangular block with towers, as at Colliston Castle (1583) and Claypotts Castle (1569–88). Particularly influential was the work of William Wallace, the king's master mason from 1617 until his death in 1631. He worked on the rebuilding of the collapsed North Range of Linlithgow from 1618, Winton House for George Seton, 3rd Earl of Winton and began work on Heriot's Hospital, Edinburgh. He adopted a distinctive style that applied elements of Scottish fortification and Flemish influences to a Renaissance plan like that used at Château d'Ancy-le-Franc. This style can be seen in lords houses built at Caerlaverlock (1620), Moray House, Edinburgh (1628) and Drumlanrig Castle (1675–89), and was highly influential until the baronial style gave way to the grander English forms associated with Inigo Jones in the later seventeenth century.

=== Restoration ===
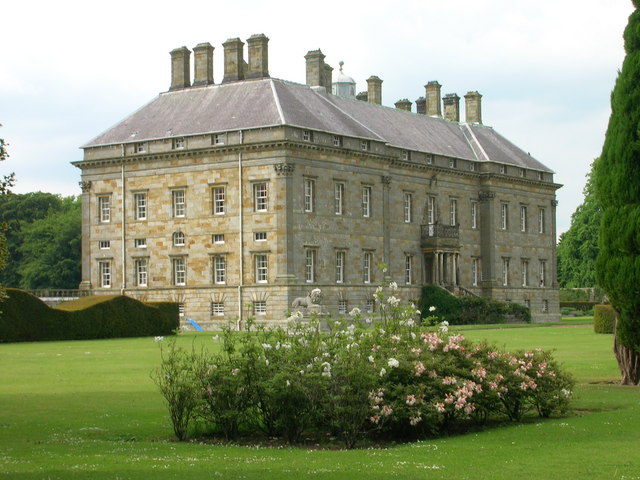
Kinross House, one of the first Palladian houses in Britain

During the turbulent era of Civil Wars and the English occupation of Scotland, significant building in Scotland was largely confined to military architecture, with polygonal fortresses with triangular bastions at Ayr, Inverness and Leith in the style of the trace italienne. After the Restoration in 1660, large scale building began again, often incorporating more comprehensive ideas of reviving classicism. Sir William Bruce (1630–1710), considered "the effective founder of classical architecture in Scotland", was the key figure in introducing the Palladian style into Scotland, following the principles of the Venetian architect Andrea Palladio (1508–80). Palladio's ideas were strongly based on the symmetry, perspective and values of the formal classical temple architecture of the Ancient Greeks and Romans, and associated in England with the designs of Inigo Jones. Bruce popularised a style of country house amongst the nobility that encouraging the move towards a more continental, leisure-oriented architecture. He built and remodelled country houses, including Thirlestane Castle and Prestonfield House. Among his most significant work was his own Palladian mansion at Kinross, built on the Loch Leven estate which he had purchased in 1675. As the Surveyor and Overseer of the Royal Works he undertook the rebuilding of the Royal Palace of Holyroodhouse in the 1670s, which gave the palace its present appearance. After the death of Charles II, Bruce lost political favour, and later, following the Glorious Revolution, he was imprisoned more than once as a suspected Jacobite. These houses were predominantly built using well-cut ashlar masonry on the façades, while rubble stonework was used only for internal walls.

James Smith worked as a mason on the Bruce's rebuilding of Holyrood Palace. In 1683 he was appointed to be Surveyor and Overseer of the Royal Works, and was responsible for maintenance of Holyrood Palace, and refurbished the former Holyrood Abbey as a chapel royal for King James VII. With his father-in-law, the master mason Robert Mylne, Smith worked on Caroline Park in Edinburgh (1685), and Drumlanrig Castle (1680s). Smith's country houses followed the pattern established by William Bruce, with hipped roofs and pedimented fronts, in a plain but handsome Palladian style. His Canongate Kirk (1688–90) is a basilica-plan, with a baroque facade. In 1691 Smith designed the mausoleum of Sir George Mackenzie of Rosehaugh, in Greyfriars Kirkyard, a circular structure modelled on the Tempietto di San Pietro, designed by Donato Bramante (1444–1514). Hamilton Palace (1695) was fronted by giant Corinthian columns, and a pedimented entrance, although was otherwise restrained. Dalkeith Palace (1702–10) was modelled after William of Orange's palace at Het Loo in the Netherlands.

== Industrial revolution ==
=== Eighteenth century ===
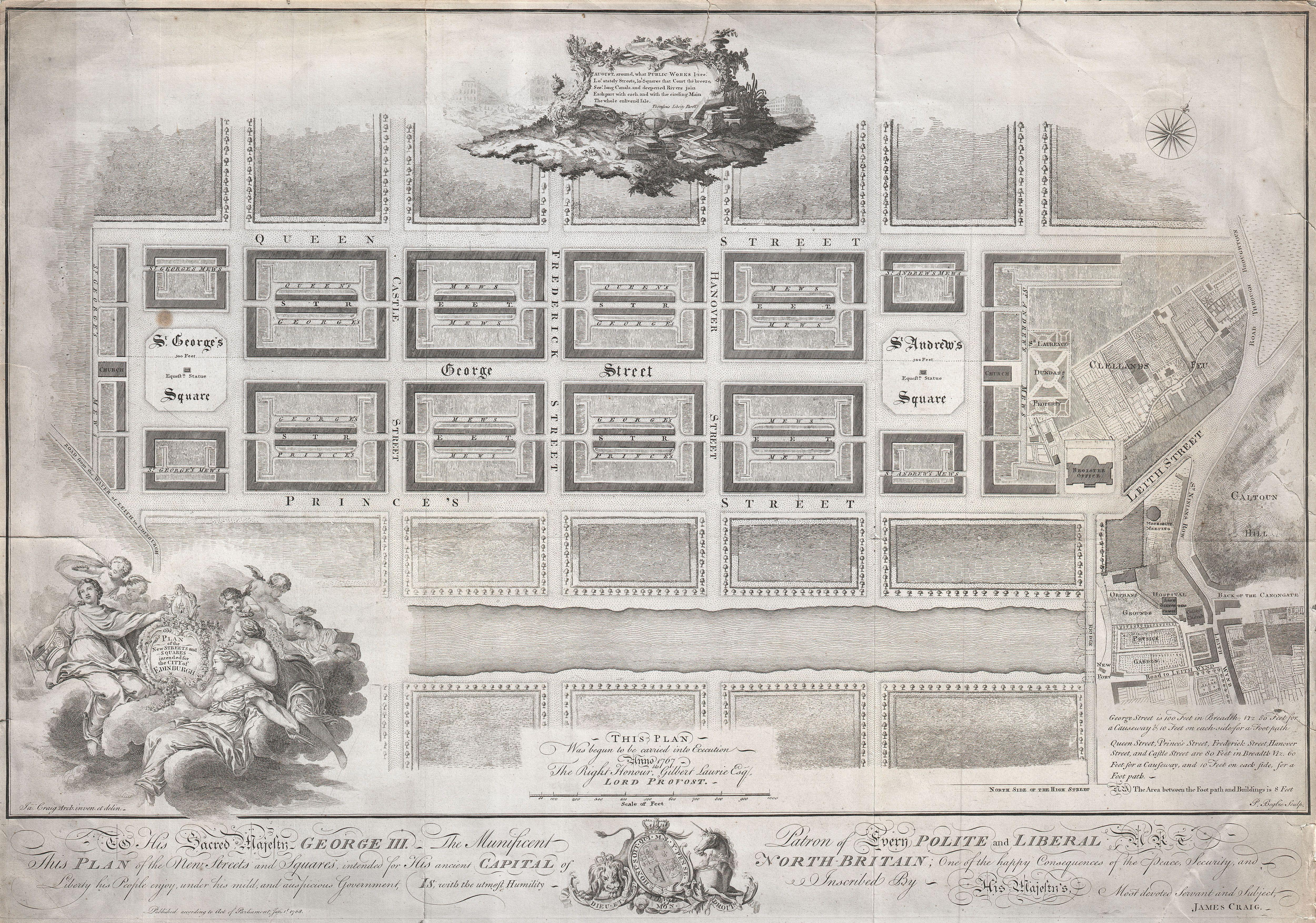
Plan for the New Town, Edinburgh by James Craig (1768)

After the Act of Union, growing prosperity in Scotland led to a spate of new building, both public and private. The threat of Jacobite insurrection or invasion meant that Scotland also saw more military building than England in this period, relying on the strength of inclined and angled engineered masonry work combined with the ability of earthen toppings that could deflect and absorb artillery fire. This culminated in the construction of Fort George, near Inverness (1748–69), with its projecting bastions and redoubts. Scotland produced some of the most significant architects of this era, including: Colen Campbell (1676–1729), James Gibbs (1682–1754), James (1732–94), John (1721–92) and Robert Adam (1728–92) and William Chambers (1723–96), who all created work that to some degree looked to classical models. Edinburgh's New Town was the focus of this classical building boom in Scotland. From the mid-eighteenth century it was laid out according to a plan of rectangular blocks with open squares, drawn up by James Craig and built in strong Craigleith sandstone which could be precisely cut by masons. Most residences were built as tenement flats, where, in contrast to contemporary building in England where buildings were divided vertically into different houses, they were divided horizontally, with different occupants sharing a common staircase. The smallest might have only one room, the largest several bedrooms and drawing rooms. This classicism, together with its reputation as a major centre of the Enlightenment, resulted in the city being nicknamed "The Athens of the North". The gridiron plan, building forms and the architectural detailing would be copied by many smaller towns, although rendered in locally quarried materials. Despite this building boom, the centralisation of much of the government administration, including the king's works, in London, meant that a number of Scottish architects spent most of all of their careers in England, where they had a major impact on Georgian architecture.

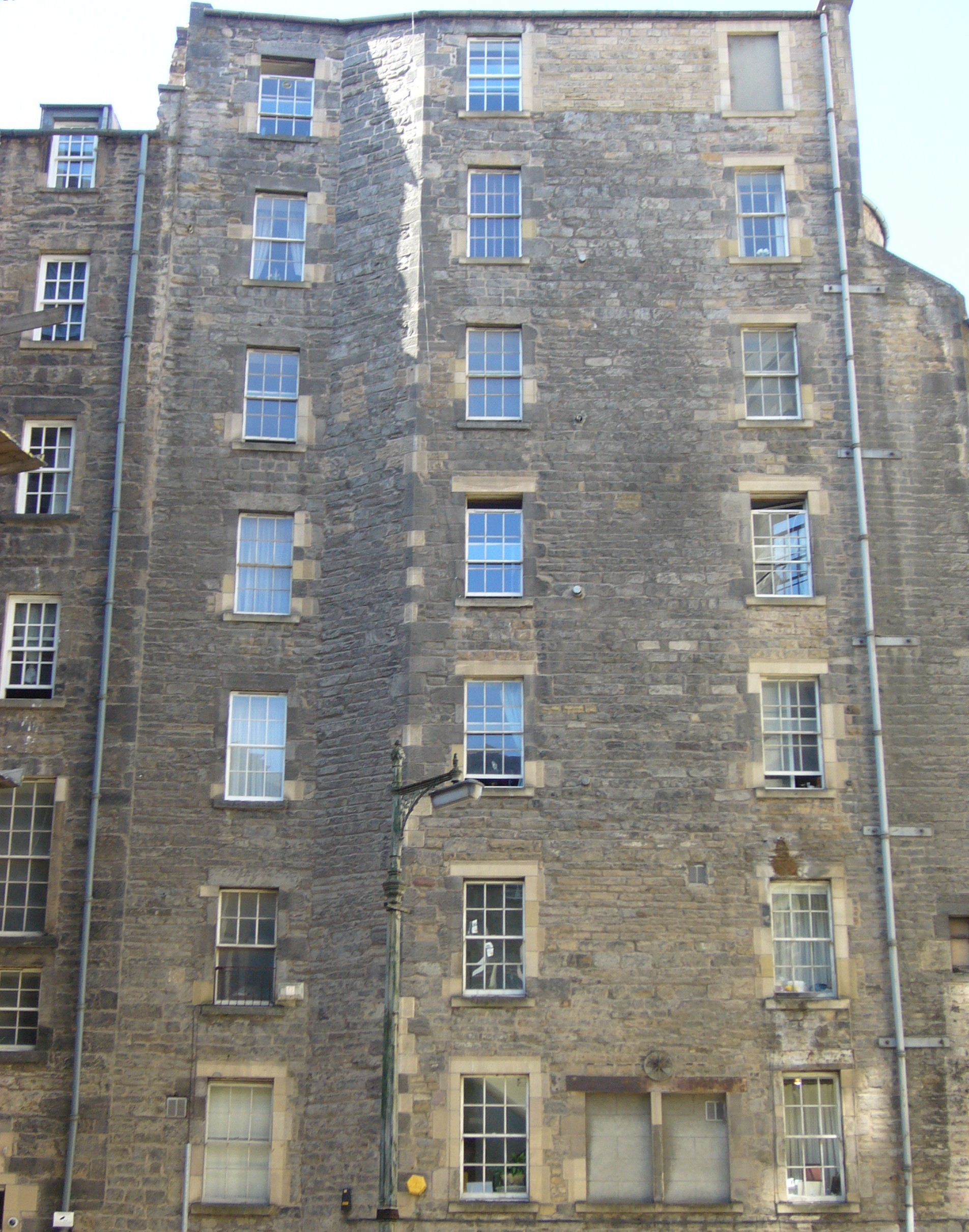
Rear view of a nineteenth-century Scottish tenement, Edinburgh

Colen Campbell was influenced by the Palladian style and has been credited with founding Georgian architecture. Architectural historian Howard Colvin has speculated that he was associated with James Smith and that Campbell may even have been his pupil. He spent most of his career in Italy and England and developed a rivalry with fellow Scot James Gibbs. Gibbs trained in Rome and also practised mainly in England. His architectural style did incorporate Palladian elements, as well as forms from Italian baroque and Inigo Jones, but was most strongly influenced by the interpretation of the Baroque by Sir Christopher Wren.

William Adam, was the foremost architect of his time in Scotland, designing and building numerous country houses and public buildings. Among his best known works are Hopetoun House near Edinburgh, and Duff House in Banff. His individual, exuberant, style was built on the Palladian style, but with Baroque details inspired by Vanbrugh and Continental architecture. After his death, his sons Robert and John took on the family business, which included lucrative work for the Board of Ordnance. Robert emerged as leader of the first phase of the neo-classical revival in England and Scotland from around 1760 until his death. He rejected the Palladian style as "ponderous" and "disgustful". However, he continued their tradition of drawing inspiration directly from classical antiquity, influenced by his four-year stay in Europe. An interior designer as well as an architect, with his brothers developing the Adam style, he influenced the development of architecture, not just in Britain, but in Western Europe, North America and in Russia, where his patterns were taken by Scottish architect Charles Cameron. Adam's main rival was William Chambers, another Scot, but born in Sweden. He did most of his work in London, with a small number of houses in Scotland. He was appointed architectural tutor to the Prince of Wales, later George III, and in 1766, with Robert Adam, as Architect to the King. More international in outlook than Adam, he combined Neoclassicism and Palladian conventions and his influence was mediated through his large number of pupils.

=== Nineteenth century ===
==== Urban growth and planning ====
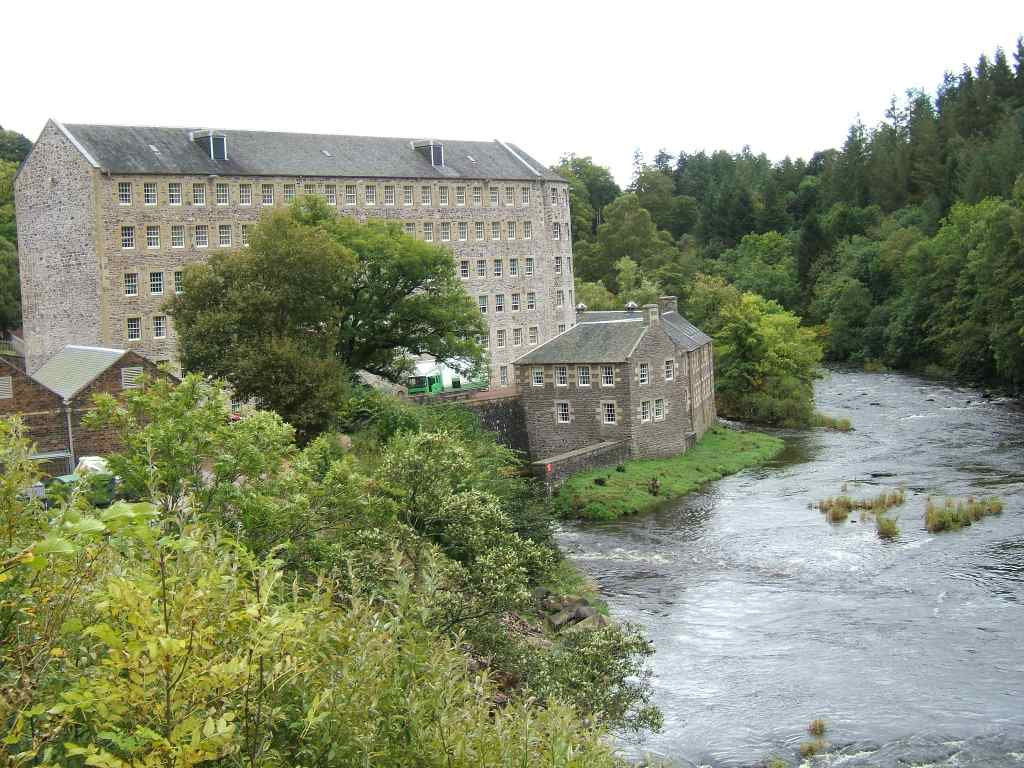
New Lanark, cotton mills and housing for workers on the banks of the River Clyde, founded in 1786 and developed by Robert Owen from 1800

Vernacular architecture of this period continued to depend on local materials and styles, increasing making use of locally mined stone. While Edinburgh made extensive use of yellow sandstone, the commercial centre and tenements of Glasgow were built in distinctive red sandstone. After a major fire in the largely wooden Aberdeen in the 1740s, the city fathers decreed that major buildings should be in the locally abundant granite, beginning a new phase in large scale mining and leading to the "granite city", as a port, becoming a centre of a major industry in the nineteenth century, which supplied Scotland and England with faced stone, pavement slabs and pillars.

Often built by groups of friends and family, the homes of the poor were usually of very simple construction. Contemporaries noted that cottages in the Highlands and Islands tended to be cruder, with single rooms, slit windows and earthen floors, often shared by a large family. In contrast many Lowland cottages had distinct rooms and chambers, were clad with plaster or paint and even had glazed windows. Urban settings also included traditional thatched houses, beside the larger, stone and slate roofed town houses of merchants and urban gentry. The Industrial Revolution transformed the scale of Scottish towns, making Glasgow the "second city of the Empire". The other side of growing wealth and planned architecture for the aristocracy and middle classes was the growth of urban sprawl, exemplified by sub-urban tenements like those of the Gorbals in Glasgow, where overcrowding, lack of sanitation and general poverty contributed to disease, crime, and very low life expediency.

The sometimes utopian concept of the new town, aimed at improving society through the foundation of architecturally designed communities, was an important part of Scottish thinking from the mid-eighteenth to the twentieth century. In addition to the New Town of Edinburgh these included the complete rebuilding of Inverary for John Campbell, 5th Duke of Argyll by John Adam and Robert Mylne, between 1772 and 1800. From 1800, Robert Owen's New Lanark, designed as a self-contained community, combining industry with ordered and improved living conditions, was an important milestone in the historical development of urban planning. Scotland also produced one of the major figures in urban planning in sociologist Patrick Geddes (1854–1932), who developed the concept of conurbation, and discarded the idea of "sweeping clearances" to remove existing housing and the imposition of the gridiron plan, in favour of "conservative surgery": retaining the best buildings in an area and removing the worst. He put this into practice, purchasing and improving slum tenements in James Court, and in new developments at Ramsay Garden, Edinburgh.

==== Gothic Revival ====
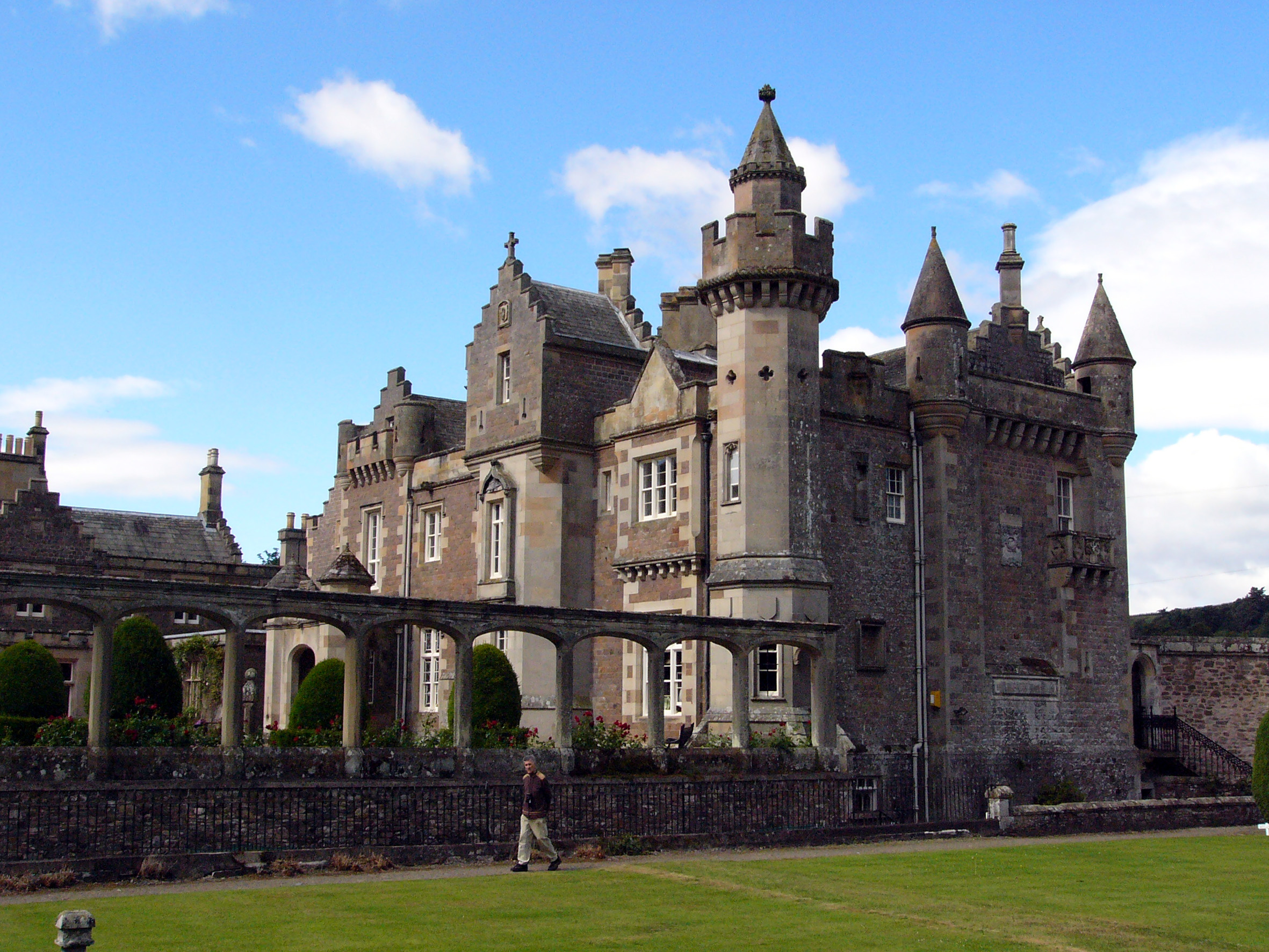
Abbotsford House, re-built for Walter Scott, helping to launch the Scots Baronial revival

The Gothic Revival in architecture has been seen as an expression of Romanticism and according to Alvin Jackson, the Scots baronial style was "a Caledonian reading of the gothic". Some of the earliest evidence of a revival in Gothic architecture is from Scotland. Inveraray Castle, constructed from 1746 with design input from William Adam displays the incorporation of turrets. These were largely conventional Palladian style houses that incorporated some external features of the Scots baronial style. Robert Adam's houses in this style include Mellerstain and Wedderburn in Berwickshire and Seton House in East Lothian, but it is most clearly seen at Culzean Castle, Ayrshire, remodelled by Adam from 1777.

Important for the adoption of the style in the early nineteenth century was Abbotsford House, the residence the novelist and poet, Sir Walter Scott. Re-built for him from 1816, it became a model for the modern revival of the baronial style. Common features borrowed from sixteenth- and seventeenth-century houses included battlemented gateways, crow-stepped gables, pointed turrets and machicolations. The style was popular across Scotland and was applied to many relatively modest dwellings by architects such as William Burn (1789–1870), David Bryce (1803–76), Edward Blore (1787–1879), Edward Calvert (c. 1847–1914) and Robert Stodart Lorimer (1864–1929) and in urban contexts, including the building of Cockburn Street in Edinburgh (from the 1850s) as well as the National Wallace Monument at Stirling (1859–69). The rebuilding of Balmoral Castle as a baronial palace and its adoption as a royal retreat from 1855 to 1858 confirmed the popularity of the style.

In ecclesiastical architecture, a style with more in common to that in England was adopted. Important figures included Frederick Thomas Pilkington (1832–98), who developed a new style of church building which accorded with the fashionable High Gothic, but which adapted it for the worship needs of the Free Church of Scotland, as at Barclay Viewforth Church, Edinburgh (1862–64). Robert Rowand Anderson (1834–1921), who trained in the office of George Gilbert Scott in London before returning to Edinburgh, worked mainly on small churches in the 'First Pointed' (or Early English) style that is characteristic of Scott's former assistants. By 1880 his practice was designing some of the most prestigious public and private buildings in Scotland, such as the Scottish National Portrait Gallery; the Dome of Old College, Medical Faculty and McEwan Hall, Edinburgh University; the Central Hotel at Glasgow Central station, the Catholic Apostolic Church in Edinburgh and Mount Stuart House on the Isle of Bute.

==== Neoclassicism ====
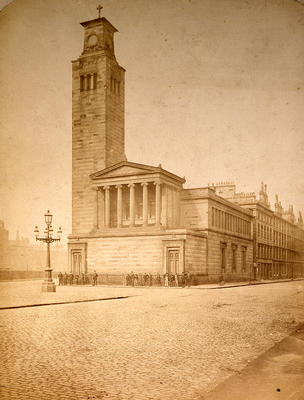
Alexander Thomson's Caledonia Road Church, Glasgow

Neoclassicism continued to be a major style into the nineteenth century. William Henry Playfair (1790–1857) was the designer of many of Edinburgh's neoclassical landmarks in the New Town. Two of his finest works are the National Gallery of Scotland and the Royal Scottish Academy, which are situated in the centre of Edinburgh. However, the figure most associated with the classical style was Alexander "Greek" Thomson (1817–75). Working mainly in Glasgow, he turned away from the Gothic style toward that of the ancient Greeks and Egyptians, as can be seen in the temple and columns that were part of the Caledonia Road Church (1856).

David Rhind (1808–83) employed both neoclassical and Baronial styles and his work included many branches of the Commercial Bank of Scotland, including their headquarters in Edinburgh. He also designed a number of churches, local government buildings, and houses. One of his grandest schemes was Daniel Stewart's Hospital, now Stewart's Melville College, Edinburgh. In 1849, he was commissioned to design the lay-out of the Pollokshields area of Glasgow, in what until then had been farmland 2 miles (3.2 km) south of the city centre. Rhind formed a partnership with Robert Hamilton Paterson (1843–1911) who executed major works for brewers, malters and warehouse-men (for which Edinburgh was a centre), including design of the Abbey, James Calder & Co., Castle, Holyrood, Drybrough's, Caledonian and Clydesdale Breweries; and also work for McVitie and Price. The partnership was to execute important projects such as the Queen Victoria Memorial at Liverpool and the Royal Scots War Memorial in St Giles' Cathedral, Edinburgh.

==== New engineering ====
The nineteenth century saw some major engineering projects including Thomas Telford's stone Dean Bridge and iron Craigellachie Bridge. The most important was the Forth Bridge, a cantilever railway bridge over the Firth of Forth in the east of Scotland, 14 kilometres (9 mi) west of central Edinburgh. Construction of a suspension bridge designed by Thomas Bouch, was stopped after the collapse of another of his works, the Tay Bridge. The project was taken over by John Fowler and Benjamin Baker, who designed a structure that was built by Glasgow-based company Sir William Arrol & Co. from 1883. It was opened on 4 March 1890, and spans a total length of 2,528.7 metres (8,296 ft). It was the first major structure in Britain to be constructed of steel; its contemporary, the Eiffel Tower was built of wrought iron.

== Twentieth century to the present ==
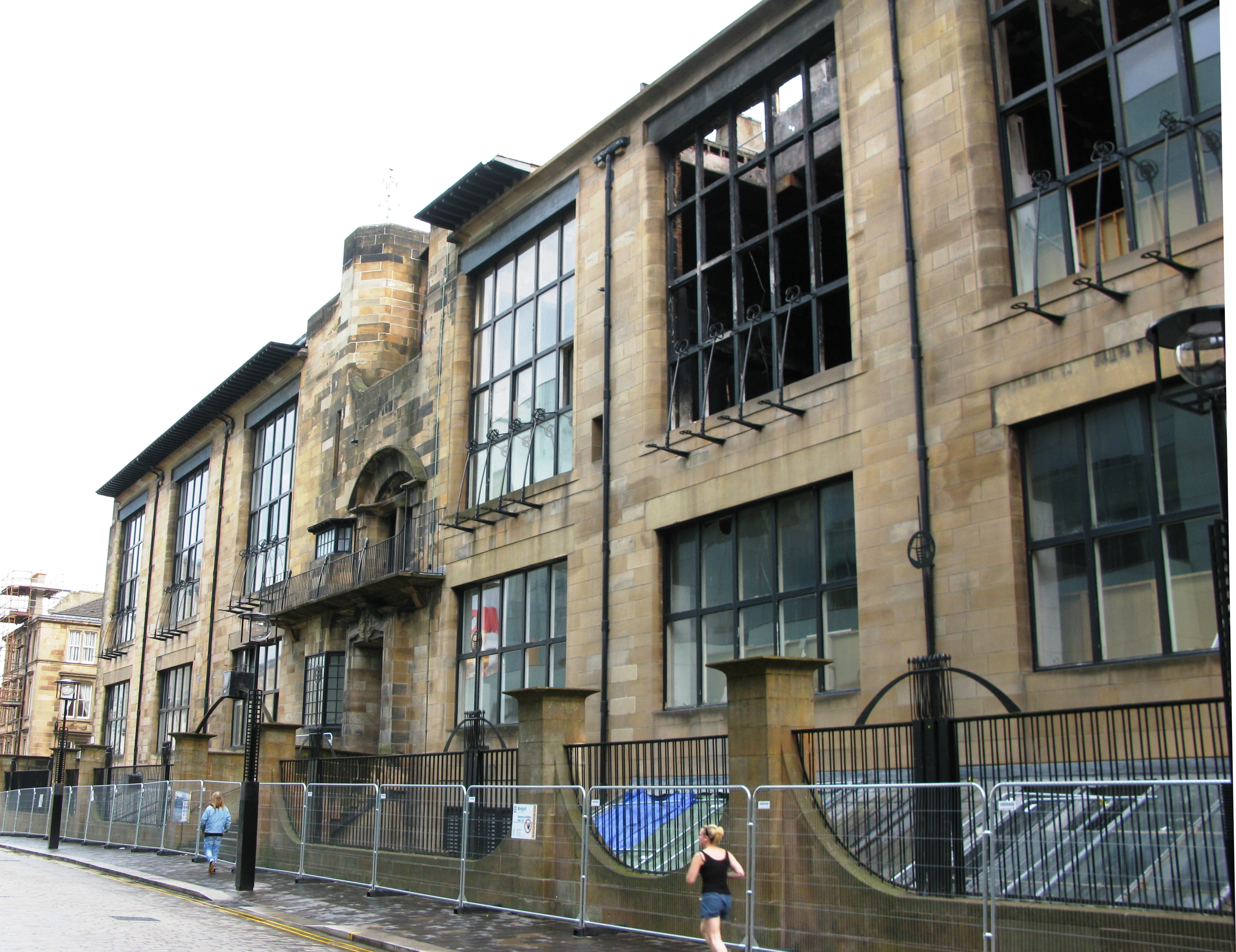
The Glasgow School of Art, often considered the greatest design of Charles Rennie Mackintosh

The most significant Scottish architect of the early twentieth century, having a considerable influence on European architecture, was Charles Rennie Mackintosh (1868–1928). He mixed elements of the Scots baronial, Arts and Crafts Movement and the Art Nouveau to produce elegant modern buildings. His major work included The Willow Tearooms in Sauchiehall Street, Glasgow (1903), Glasgow School of Art (1897–1909) and Hill House, Helensburgh (1902–04). The influence of Mackintosh's Glasgow style can be seen in the work of architects like James Salmon (1873–1924), whose designs included the heavily glass-fronted, Art Nouveau "Hatrack" (1899–1902) on Vincent Street and the Lion Chambers, Hope Street (1904–05), an early example of reinforced concrete construction.

In the 20th century the distinctive Scottish use of stone architecture declined as it was replaced by cheaper alternatives such as Portland cement, concrete, and mass-production brick. Stone would however be retained as a material for some housing stock in Edinburgh, Aberdeen and Dumfries, and would undergo revivals. In the twentieth century private architecture was increasingly client driven. James Robert Rhind (1854–1918), the son of David Rhind, was successful in the competition for new libraries to be constructed in Glasgow following Andrew Carnegie's gift of £100,000 to the city in 1901. His designs were selected for seven libraries, allowing him to demonstrate his individual interpretation of Edwardian Baroque architecture. Rhind's libraries were all built with locally quarried sandstone, which blended in with the existing tenement neighbourhoods. His landmark buildings were greatly enhanced by his liberal use of columns, domes and sculpted features. James Miller (1860–1947) is noted for his Scottish railway stations, such as his 1901–05 extensions to Glasgow Central railway station, and the spectacular Wemyss Bay railway station on the Firth of Clyde.

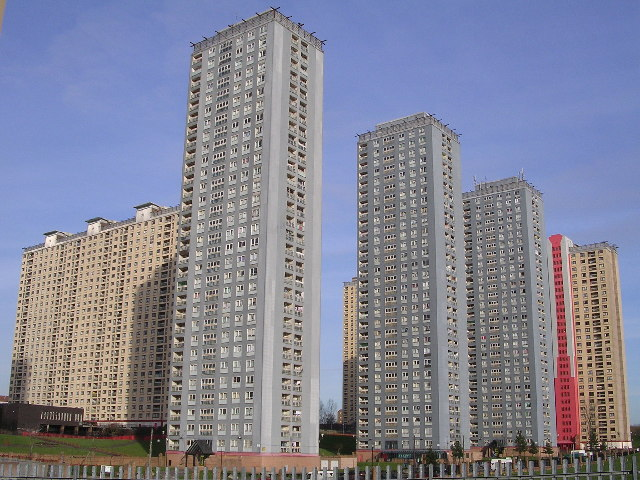
The eight towers of the brutalist Red Road Flats, Glasgow

After the First World War, Miller and his chief designer Richard Gunn (1889–1933) along with others, adapted to the growing needs of the office block. In Glasgow, with its central gridiron plan, this followed the practice in the United States of filling up entire blocks and building steel framed buildings as high as the fire marshal would allow, as in the heavily American-influenced Union Bank building (1924) at St Vincent Street. From the mid-twentieth century, public architecture became more utilitarian, as part of the impulse to produce a comprehensive welfare state. Thomas S. Tait (1882–1954) was among the most important modernist architects of the era, using pyramidal stepped designs for buildings like the St Andrew's House, Edinburgh (1935–39) built for the Scottish Office, and the 1939 "Tower of Empire" for the Empire Exhibition, Scotland 1938, held in Bellahouston Park.

During World War I the government became increasingly aware of Scotland's housing problems, particularly after the Glasgow rent strike of 1915. A royal commission of 1917 reported on the "unspeakably filthy privy-middens in many of the mining areas, badly constructed incurably damp labourers' cottages on farms, whole townships unfit for human occupation in the crofting counties and islands ... groups of lightless and unventilated houses in the older burghs, clotted masses of slums in the great cities". The result was a massive programme of council house building. Many early council houses were built on greenfield sites away from the pollution of the city, often constructed of semi-detached homes or terraced cottages. Knightswood, north-west of Glasgow, was built as a show piece from 1923 to 1929, with a library, social centre and seven shopping "parades". In the 1930s schemes tended to be more cheaply built, like Blackhill, Glasgow, with a thousand houses built as two and three-story tenements. These building schemes were designed to rehouse those displaced by urban slum clearance, by which thousands of tenements were demolished. However, often crammed into poor land near railways or gasworks, they soon became notorious. A survey of 1936 found that almost half of Scotland's houses were still inadequate.

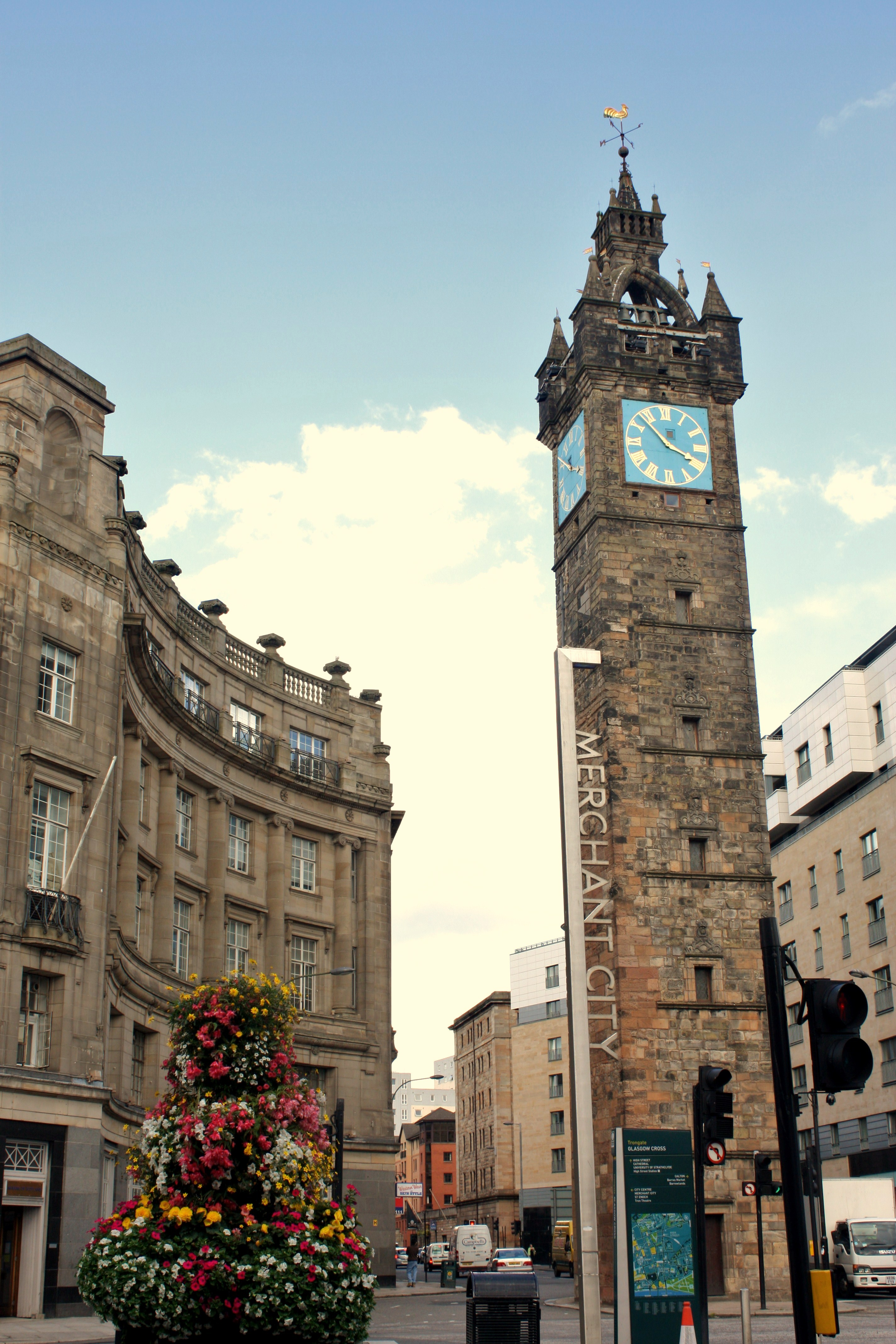
The revitalised Merchant City, Glasgow

In the post-war period Scotland continued to produce important architects, including James Stirling (1926–92), who with James Gowan (1923–2015) designed the Flats at Ham Common, London (1955–58), considered a landmark in the development of modernist, brutalist residential planning, which would have a profound impact in Scotland. Their later work, almost all of it outside Scotland, would be highly influential on an international scale. The post-war desire for urban regeneration would focus on the tower block, championed in Glasgow by David Gibson, convener of the city housing committee. Projects like the brutalist Red Road Flats originally offered hope of a new beginning and an escape from the overcrowded nineteenth-century tenements of the city, but lacked a sufficient infrastructure and soon deteriorated. Robert Matthew (1906–75) and Basil Spence (1907–76) were responsible for redeveloping the Gorbals in Glasgow, for demolitions at the University of Edinburgh and the stark rebuilding typified by the David Hume Tower (1960–63, now named 40 George Square). Another solution adopted in Scotland was the building of new towns like Glenrothes (1948) and Cumbernauld (1956), designed to take excess population from the cities. Cumbernauld was praised for its architecture when first built, but the uncompleted centre and the layout of the town in general, were receiving heavy criticism by the twenty-first century: its modernist architecture described by one resident as "the lego fantasy of an unhappy child".

From the 1980s Scottish architecture began to recover its reputation with works such as the building to house the Burrell Collection in Glasgow (1981). Recent major public buildings include the Scottish Exhibition and Conference Centre, Glasgow (1997), designed by Norman Foster (1935–) and known for its segmented, curving roof as "the Armadillo", and the many striking modern buildings along the side of the River Clyde, including the Glasgow Science Centre, IMAX Cinema and Glasgow Tower (2001), which is the highest in Scotland. The most important building of the early twenty-first century is the Scottish Parliament Building in Edinburgh, designed by Enric Miralles (1955–2000) and opened in 2004, with a design that recalls upturned fishing boats. There have been increasing attempts to preserve much of what survives from Scotland's architectural heritage, including the great buildings and monuments, but also the classically influenced houses of towns like Edinburgh and Glasgow and the surviving tenements, many of which have been renovated, restored to their original pink and honeyed sandstone from the black fronts created by pollution and brought up to modern standards of accommodation. Urban regeneration has also been attempted in areas of post-industrial decline, like the Merchant City in Glasgow, which was returned to housing from the 1980s, with warehouse loft conversions and more recently the waterfront in Edinburgh, resulting in a return of populations to major urban centres.

== List of Scottish architects and master masons ==
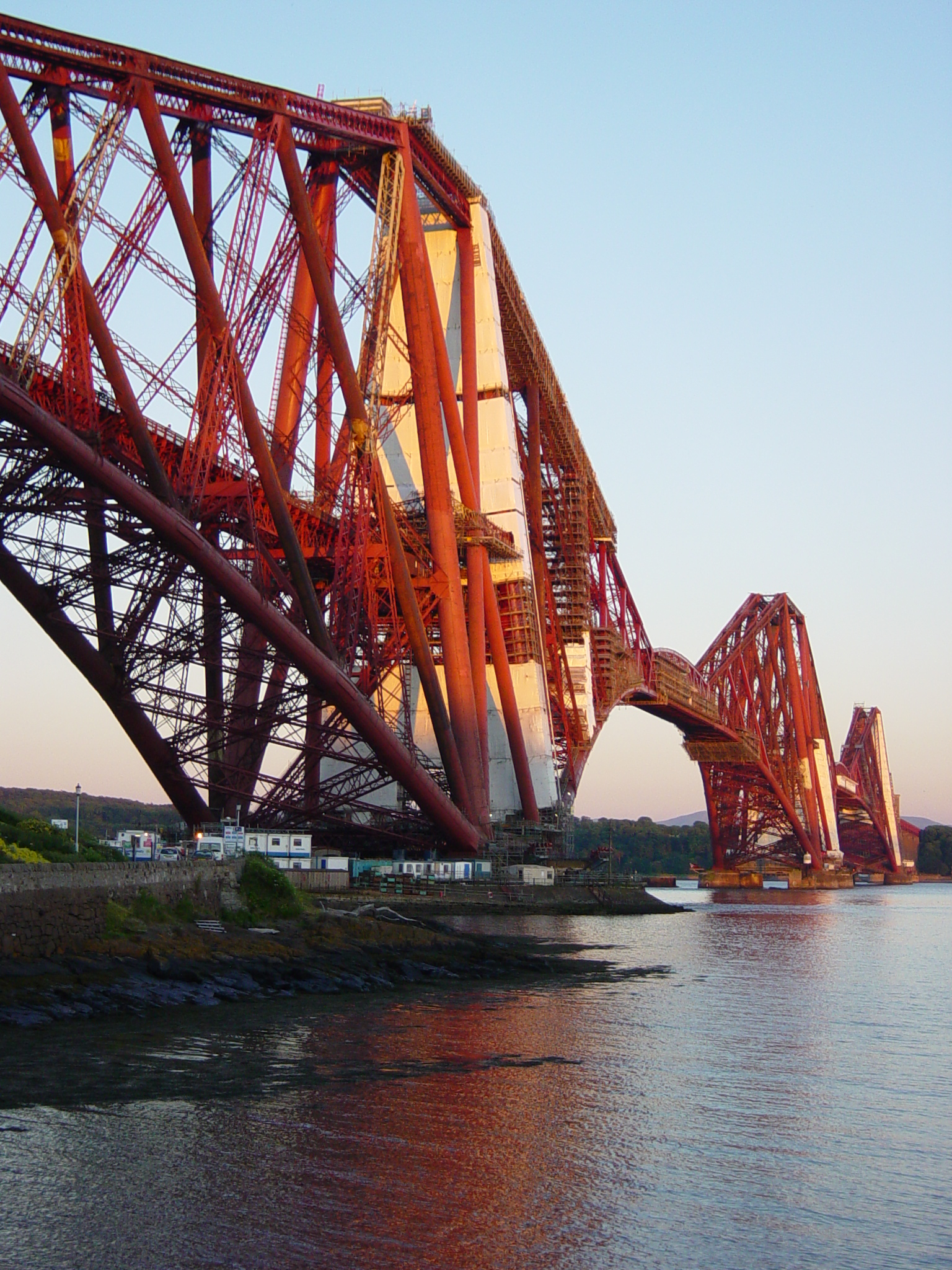
The Forth Railway Bridge is a cantilever bridge over the Firth of Forth in eastern Scotland.

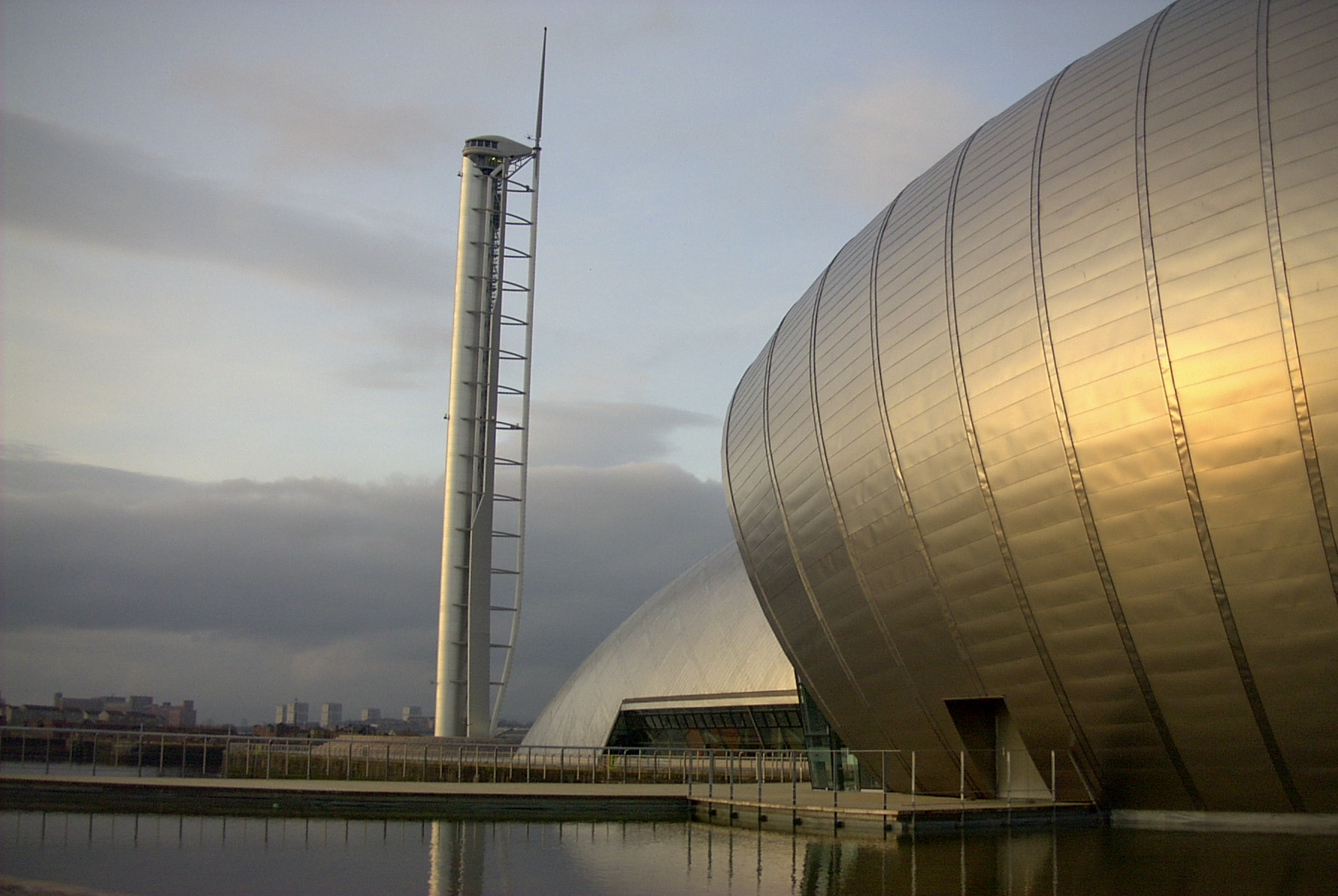
Glasgow Tower, Scotland's tallest tower, and the IMAX Cinema at the Glasgow Science Centre.

- James Adam (1732–1794), son of William Adam
- John Adam (1721–1792), eldest son of William Adam
- Robert Adam (1728–1792)
- William Adam (1689–1748), father of Robert; architect and builder
- John Macvicar Anderson (1835–1915)
- Robert Rowand Anderson (1834–1921)
- Howard Ashley, architect practicing in Malaya, who worked for the Public Works Department of Malaysia
- George Ashdown Audsley (1838–1925), architect, artist, illustrator, writer, and pipe organ designer
- William James Audsley (1833–1907)
- Ormrod Maxwell Ayrton (1874–1960), FRIBA
- John Baird (1798–1859), influential figure in the development of Glasgow Georgian and Victorian Architecture
- Andrew Balfour (1863–1943), architect, work including Holmlea Primary School, Glasgow
- Isobel Hogg Kerr Beattie (1900–1970), possibly the first woman to practise architecture in Scotland
- John Begg (1866–1937), architect who practised in London, South Africa and India, and taught at Edinburgh College of Art
- William Bryce Binnie (c. 1885–c. 1963)
- Alexander Black (c.1790–1858)
- Hippolyte Blanc (1844–1917)
- Thomas Bonnar (c.1770–1847), interior designer and architect
- James MacLellan Brown (c. 1886–1967), city architect of Dundee, designer of the Mills Observatory
- Thomas Brown (1781–1850), architect, works including Bellevue Church, Edinburgh
- Thomas Brown (1806–1872), architect notable for prison design
- Sir George Washington Browne (1853–1939)
- Sir William Bruce (c. 1630–1710)
- David Bryce (1803–1876)
- William Burn (1789–1870)
- John Burnet (1814–1901), architect who lived and practised in Glasgow
- Sir John James Burnet (1857–1938), Edwardian architect, son of John Burnet
- James Burton, famous London property developer and architect; father of Decimus Burton and James Burton (Egyptologist)
- James Byres of Tonley (1733–1817), architect, antiquary and dealer in Old Master paintings and antiquities
- Edward Calvert (c. 1847–1914)
- Charles Cameron (1743–1812)
- Alexander Buchanan Campbell (1914–2007)
- Alexander Lorne Campbell (1871–1944), architect, who practised across Scotland, founder of Scott & Campbell
- Colen Campbell (1676–1729)
- Colin Robert Vaughan Campbell, 7th Earl Cawdor (born 1962)
- John Campbell (1857–1942)
- John Chesser (1819–1892), architect largely based in Edinburgh
- Jack Coia (1898–1981) of Gillespie, Kidd and Coia.
- Ninian Comper (1864-1960)
- George Corson (1829–1910)
- David Cousin (1809–1878), architect, landscape architect and planner
- James Craig (1739–1795)
- James Hoey Craigie (1870–1930)
- Alexander Hunter Crawford (1865–1945), architect and businessman, owner of Crawford's Biscuits
- Alexander Davidson (1839–1908), architect active in Australia
- William Gordon Dey (1911–1997), architect who specialised in college buildings
- John Douglas of Pinkerton (c.1709–1778), architect who designed and reformed several country houses
- Sir Robert Drummond of Carnock (died 1592), Master of Work to the Crown of Scotland
- Sir James Duncan Dunbar-Nasmith, (born 1927), leading conservation architect
- Alan Dunlop (born 1958)
- John Murray Easton (1889–1975), architect, winner of the Royal Gold Medal for architecture
- Alexander Edward (1651–1708), Episcopalian clergyman, draughtsman, architect and landscape designer
- Archibald Elliot (1760–1823)
- Reginald Francis Joseph Fairlie (1883–1952), architect of the National Library of Scotland
- James Fergusson (1808–1886)
- Claude Waterlow Ferrier (1879–1935), architect, specialising in the Art Deco style
- James Leslie Findlay (1868–1952)
- Kathryn Findlay (1953-2014)
- Robert Findlay (1859–1951)
- George Topham Forrest (1872–1945)
- William Fowler (1824–1906), 19th-century Scottish architect linked to Golspie and area
- Malcolm Fraser (born 1959)
- Patrick Allan Fraser (1812–1890), was architect and painter
- Andrew Frazer (died 1792)
- Thomas Gildard (died 1895), architect of Britannia Music Hall
- James Gibbs (1682–1754)
- Charles Lovett Gill (1880–1960)
- James Gowan (1923–2015), postmodernist architect of the "engineering style"
- Sir James Gowans (1821–1890), maverick Edinburgh architect and builder
- James Gillespie Graham (1776–1855)
- John Edgar Gregan (1813–1855)
- David Hamilton (1768–1843)
- Sir James Hamilton of Finnart (c1495–1540), Master of Work to the Crown of Scotland
- Thomas Hamilton (1784–1858)
- John Henderson (1804–1862), architect chiefly remembered as a church architect
- William Hastie (1753/1763–1832)
- Gareth Hoskins (1967–2016), architect, UK Architect of the year 2006
- Edith Mary Wardlaw Burnet Hughes (1888–1971), considered Britain's first practising woman architect, who established her own firm in 1920
- Robert Hurd (1905-1963)
- Ernest Auldjo Jamieson (1880–1937), architect specialising in country houses, largely for wealthy family friends
- George Meikle Kemp (1795–1844), carpenter, draughtsman, and architect, best known as the designer of the Scott Monument
- Robert Kerr (1823–1904), co-founder of the Architectural Association
- Sir William Hardie Kininmonth (1904–1988), architect whose work mixed a modern style with Scottish vernacular
- William Leiper (1839–1916)
- David Lennox (1788–1873), bridge-builder and master stonemason, working in Australia
- John Lessels (1809–1883)
- Ian G Lindsay (1906–1966)
- Robert Lorimer (1864–1929)
- David MacGibbon (1831–1902)
- Kate Macintosh (born 1937), architect of Dawson's Heights in Southwark
- Alexander George Robertson Mackenzie (1879–1963), architect, in London and Aberdeen
- Alexander Marshall Mackenzie (1848–1933)
- Charles Rennie Mackintosh (1868–1928), architect, designer and watercolourist; husband and business partner of Margaret McDonald
- James Marjoribanks MacLaren (1853–1890), associated with the Arts and Crafts movement and Scottish Vernacular architecture
- Thomas MacLaren (1863–1928), architect who worked in London, and the United States
- Andy MacMillan(1928–2014), architect, educator, writer and broadcaster
- Ebenezer James MacRae (1881–1951), City Architect for Edinburgh
- Thomas P. Marwick (1854–1927), architect based in Edinburgh, important to the architectural character of Marchmont
- Robert Matheson (1808–1877), architect and Clerk of Works for Scotland
- Robert Matthew (1906–1975)
- John McAslan, CBE (born 1954), designed many buildings around the world, such as the new departures concourse at London King's Cross railway station, the Iron Market in Port-au-Prince and the Olympia Park in Moscow
- James Mckissack (1875-1940), cinema architect
- John McLachlan (1843–1893), architect based in Edinburgh
- George McRae (1858–1923), architect who migrated to Australia and pursued his career in Sydney
- Sir Frank Charles Mears (1880–1953)
- Adam Menelaws (born between 1748 and 1756–1831)
- James Miller (1860–1947)
- Sydney Mitchell (1856–1930)
- Robert Morham (1839–1912), City Architect for Edinburgh
- Richard Murphy (born 1955), architect, winner of the 2016 RIBA House of the year
- Gordon Murray (born 1954)
- Sir James Murray of Kilbaberton (died 1634), master wright and architect
- John Mylne (died 1621), master mason
- John Mylne of Perth (c. 1585–1657), master mason
- John Mylne (1611–1667), master mason and architect
- Robert Mylne (1633–1710), stonemason and architect, last Master Mason to the Crown of Scotland
- Robert Mylne (1733–1811), architect and civil engineer, remembered for Blackfriars Bridge, London
- Walter Newall (1780–1863)
- Peter Nicholson (1765–1844)
- John Paterson (died 1832)
- Robert Hamilton Paterson (1843–1911), partner in the architectural practice, Hamilton-Paterson and Rhind
- David Paton (1801–1882), Scottish architect and builder, who worked in the United States in the 1830s
- John Dick Peddie (1824–1891)
- John More Dick Peddie (1853–1921)
- Frederick Thomas Pilkington (1832–1898)
- James Playfair (1755–1794), father of William Henry
- William Henry Playfair (1790–1857)
- B. Marcus Priteca (1889–1971)
- Alan Reiach (1910-1992)
- Robert Reid Raeburn (1819–1888), architect who worked in and around Edinburgh
- Robert Reid (1774–1856), King's architect and surveyor for Scotland
- John Rennie (1761-1822)
- David Rhind (1808–1883)
- James Robert Rhind (1854–1918)
- John Rhind (1836–1889), architect from Inverness
- George Richardson (c. 1737–c. 1813), architectural and decorative draftsman
- John Thomas Rochead (1814–1878)
- Thomas Ross (1839–1930)
- Fred Rowntree (1860–1927), Arts and Crafts architect
- Witold Rybczynski (born 1943)
- James Salmon (1873–1924), grandson of James Salmon (1805–1888)
- James Salmon (1805–1888), grandfather of James Salmon (1873–1924)
- William Schaw (c. 1550–1602), Master of Works to James VI of Scotland for building castles and palaces
- John Scrimgeour of Myres (fl. 16th century), Master of Work for royal buildings for James V and Mary, Queen of Scots
- James Robb Scott (1882–1965), Chief Architect of the Southern Railway
- James Sellars (1843–1888)
- Richard Norman Shaw (1831–1912), architect known for his country houses and for commercial buildings
- Archibald Simpson (1790–1847), one of the major architects of Aberdeen
- James Smith (c. 1645–1731)
- James Smith of Jordanhill (1782–1867), architect, merchant, antiquarian, geologist, biblical critic and man of letters
- John Smith (1781–1852), first official city architect of Aberdeen
- Robert Smith (1722–1777), emigrant to America
- William Smith (1817–1891)
- John Soutar (1881–1951)
- James Souttar (1840–1922), worked in Sweden
- Basil Spence (1907–1976)
- John James Stevenson (1831–1908)
- James Stirling (1926–1992)
- John Tait (1787–1856), architect based in Edinburgh
- Thomas S. Tait (1882–1954)
- Bruce James Talbert (1838–1881), architect and interior designer
- Harold Tarbolton (1869–1947) architect based in Edinburgh.
- Sir Andrew Thomas Taylor (1850–1937), architect and Conservative Party municipal councillor
- Alexander "Greek" Thomson (1817–1875)
- Leslie Grahame Thomson (1896–1974)
- James Thomson (1852–1927), City Engineer, City Architect, and Housing Director of Dundee
- Ramsay Traquair, (1874–1952)architect and academic with strong links to Canada
- James Campbell Walker (1821–1888), architect specialising in poorhouses and schools
- William Wallace (died 1631)
- Frederick Walters (1849–1931), notable for Roman Catholic churches
- George Henry Walton (1867–1933)
- Thomas Lennox Watson (c. 1850–1920)
- William Weir (1865–1950)
- Charles Wilson (1810–1863)
- Robert Wilson (1834–1901), architect for the Edinburgh Board of Education
- George Wittet (1878–1926), architect working mostly in Bombay, India
- William Young (1843–1900), designer of Glasgow City Chambers

== See also ==
- Architecture of England
- Dictionary of Scottish Architects
- Prospect 100 best modern Scottish buildings
- Scottish Vernacular
