= Architecture of Scotland in the Roman era =

Buildings of Scotland in the Roman era

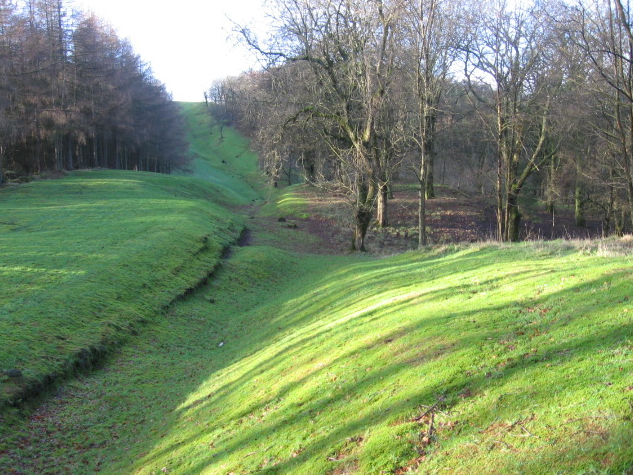
The course of the Antonine Wall, at Bar Hill, the largest single Roman built structure in the modern borders of Scotland

The architecture of Scotland in the Roman era includes all building within the modern borders of Scotland, from the arrival of the Romans in northern Britain in the first century BCE, until their departure in the fifth century CE. Ptolemy indicated that there were 19 "towns" in Caledonia, north of the Roman province of Britannia, but no clear evidence of urban settlements has been found and these were probably hillforts. There is evidence of over 1,000 such forts, most south of the Clyde-Forth line, but the majority seem to have been abandoned in the Roman period. There is also evidence of distinctive stone wheelhouses and small underground souterrains.

From about 71 CE the Romans began military expeditions into what is now Scotland, building forts, like that at Trimontium, and probably pushing north as far as the River Tay where they created more fortifications, like those at Inchtuthil. These were soon abandoned, and the Romans settled for the occupation of the Southern Uplands by the end of the first century, south of a line drawn between the Tyne and Solway Firth. This resulted in more fortifications and the building of Hadrian's Wall across what is now northern England. Around 141 CE they moved up to construct a new limes, a sward-covered wall made of turf known as the Antonine Wall, the largest Roman structure in modern Scotland. They soon retreated to Hadrian's Wall, with occasional expeditions that involved the building and reoccupation of forts, until the collapse of Roman power in the early fifth century.

== Caledonia ==
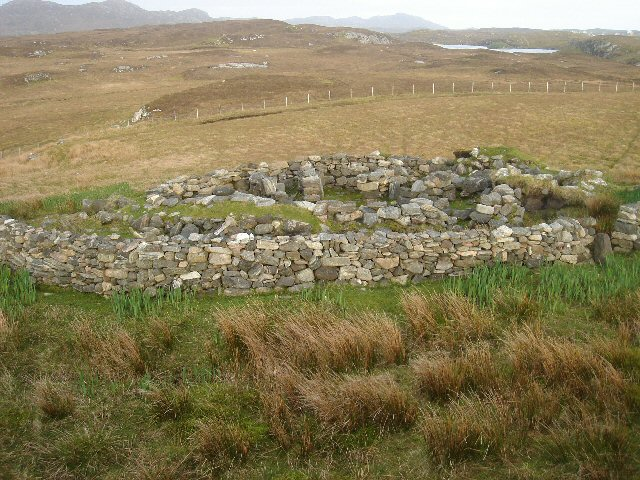
A wheelhouse on Grimsay

Caledonia was the name that the Romans gave to the land north of their province of Britannia. In his Geographia, Ptolemy, possibly drawing on earlier sources of information as well as more contemporary accounts from the Agricolan invasion, identified 19 "towns" in Caledonia. No archaeological evidence of any truly urban places has been found from this time, and the names may have indicated hill forts, temporary markets or meeting places. Most of the names are obscure: Devana may be the modern Banchory, Alauna (meaning "the rock") in the west is probably Dumbarton Rock and the place of the same name in the east of the Lowlands may be the site of Edinburgh Castle. Lindon may be Balloch on Loch Lomond side. There is evidence for about 1,000 Iron Age hillforts in Scotland, most located below the Clyde-Forth line. The majority are circular, with a single palisade around an enclosure. However, they appear to have been largely abandoned in the Roman period. There are also numerous vitrified forts, whose walls have been subjected to fire, which may date to this period, but an accurate chronology has not been created. Extensive studies of this type of fort at Finavon Hill near Forfar in Angus, suggest dates for the destruction of the site in either the last two centuries BCE, or the mid-first millennium CE. Many of these forts were reoccupied after the Roman departure.

Beyond the area of Roman occupation, in the west and north, there are over 60 sites identified of wheelhouses. Perhaps a development of earlier Atlantic roundhouses, these have a characteristic outer wall surrounding a circle of stone piers (bearing a resemblance to the spokes of a wheel). Over 400 souterrains, small underground constructions, have been discovered in Scotland, many of them in the south-east, and although few have been dated, those that have suggest a construction date in the second or third centuries CE. They are usually found close to settlements (whose timber frames are much less well-preserved) and may have been for storing perishable agricultural products.

== Early Roman constructions ==
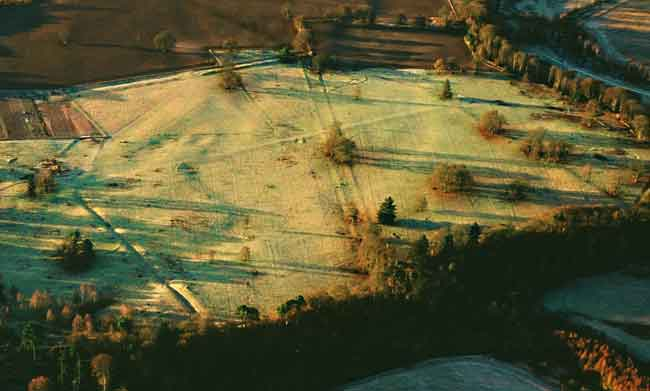
The site of the fortress at Inchtuthil

The Romans began military expeditions into what is now Scotland from about 71 CE. In 78 CE Gnaeus Julius Agricola arrived in Britain as the new governor and began a series of major incursions. Two years later his legions constructed a substantial fort at Trimontium near Melrose. He is said to have pushed his armies to the estuary of the "River Taus" (usually assumed to be the River Tay) and established forts there, including a legionary fortress at Inchtuthil. After his victory over the northern tribes at Mons Graupius in 84 CE, a series of forts and towers were established along the Gask Ridge, which marked the boundary between the Lowland and Highland zones, probably forming the first Roman limes or frontier in Scotland.

Agricola's successors were unable or unwilling to further subdue the far north. The fortress at Inchtuthil was dismantled before its completion, and the other fortifications of the Gask Ridge were abandoned within a few years. By 87 CE the occupation was limited to the Southern Uplands, and by the end of the first century the northern limit of Roman expansion was a line drawn between the Tyne and the Solway Firth. Elginhaugh fort, in Midlothian, dates to about this period, as may Castle Greg in West Lothian. The Romans eventually withdrew to a line in what is now northern England, building the fortification known as Hadrian's Wall from coast to coast.

== The Antonine Wall and later invasions ==
The locations of Hadrian's Wall and the Antonine Wall

Around 141 CE the Romans undertook a reoccupation of southern Scotland, moving up to construct a new limes between the Firth of Forth and the Firth of Clyde. The resulting Antonine Wall is the largest Roman construction inside Scotland. It is a sward-covered wall made of turf, around 20 feet (6 m) high, with nineteen forts and extending for 37 miles (60 km). The stone foundations and wing walls of the original forts demonstrate that the intention was to build a stone wall similar to Hadrian's Wall, but this was quickly amended. There is a wide ditch on the north side, and a military way on the south. The Romans initially planned to build forts every 6 miles (10 km), but this was soon revised to every 2 miles (3 km). One of the best preserved forts, but also one of the smallest, is Rough Castle Fort. In addition to the forts, there are at least nine smaller fortlets, probably on Roman mile spacings, which formed part of the original scheme, some of which were later replaced by forts. The most visible fortlet is Kinneil, at the eastern end of the Wall, near Bo'ness. Having taken twelve years to build, the wall was overrun and abandoned soon after 160 CE. The Romans retreated to the line of Hadrian's Wall.

Roman troops penetrated far into the north of modern Scotland several more times, with at least four major campaigns. The Antonine Wall was occupied again for a brief period after 197 CE. The most notable invasion was in 209 when the emperor Septimius Severus led a major campaign. A string of forts was constructed in the north-east (some of which may have been begun in the earlier Antonine campaign). These include camps associated with the Elsick Mounth, such as Normandykes, Ythan Wells, Deers Den and Glenmailen. Only two forts in Scotland, at Cramond and Carpow (in the Tay valley) are definitely known to have been permanently occupied during this incursion. There is evidence that these campaigns are coincident with the wholesale destruction and abandonment of souterrains in southern Scotland. This may have been due either to Roman military aggression or the collapse of local grain markets in the wake of Roman withdrawal. After the death of Severus in 210 the Romans withdrew back to Hadrian's Wall, which would be the frontier until Roman authority in Britain collapsed in the fifth century.

== See also ==
- Architecture of Scotland in the Prehistoric era
- Architecture in Medieval Scotland
- Architecture of Scotland
