= Scottish Vernacular =

Style of architecture

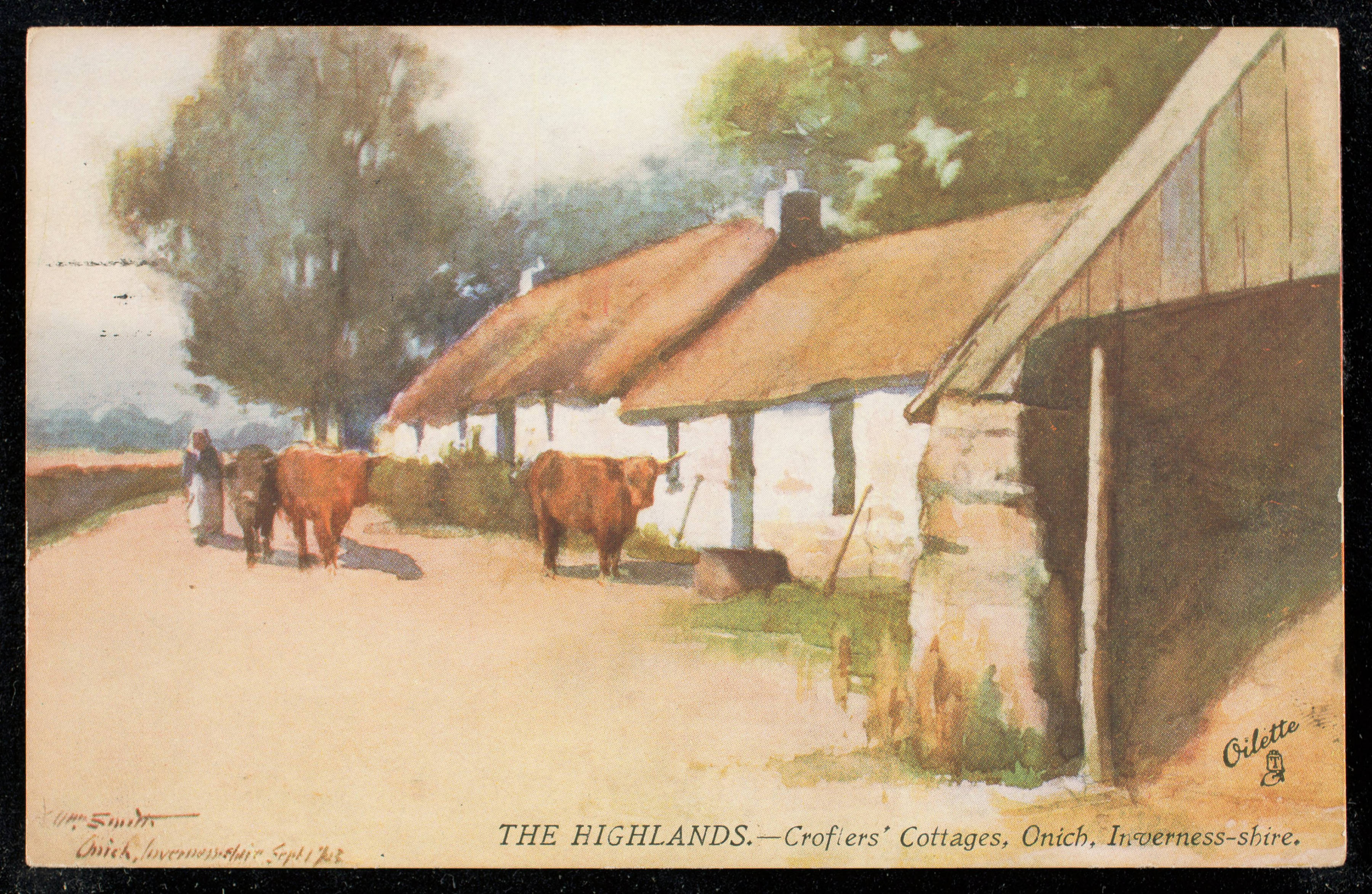
Crofters' Cottages, Onich, Inverness-shire are examples of vernacular architecture in Scotland

Scottish Vernacular architecture is a form of folk architecture that uses local materials. In Scotland, where stone is plentiful and long-span timber in short supply, stone was a common building material, employed in both mortared and dry stone construction.

== Types of vernacular residences ==
Bastle house
Most often found along the Anglo-Scottish border. They are multi-storey farmhouses with sophisticated security measures designed to provide defense against the frequent border raiding parties. The characteristic features include: thick stone walls (of around one metre deep); a stone vault separating the first and second levels of the building and exterior windows of narrow slits and a roof made of slate for its fire-resistant properties. The ground floor was occupied by valuable livestock while the first floor provided space for the family's living quarters.
Blackhouse
Constructed of dry-stone walls packed with earth and wooden rafters covered with a thatched roof. Floors were typically made of flagstones. A central hearth provided heating, but there was no chimney and smoke escaped through the ceiling. Aside from a main entrance, blackhouses had no other openings. The house was situated low on the landscape as a means of avoiding storm-damage. Blackhouses were used to accommodate both livestock and people who were separated by a simple partition. Animal dung remained in the house until the following Spring, and this practice proved to be a breeding ground for germs and facilitated the spread of tuberculosis. Blackhouses were most often grouped together close to a water-source. The introduction of crofting, following the highland clearances of the 18th and 19th-centuries, led to the demise of the blackhouse. Some 400 examples of the blackhouse can still be found in Scotland.
Crofter's cottage
Similar to a blackhouse or longhouse, constructed of stone walls, but the crofter's cottage differed from the blackhouse in that the animals were not housed inside. Traditional crofters' cottages were very crude constructions - two stone walls filled with earth for insulation, the roof was of thatch or turf and stone slabs were set into the middle of the room for a peat fire which provided some form of central heating. From the 18th century, thatched roofs were gradually replaced with clean timber covered with canvas sails which were treated annually with coat of coal tar. Lime-washed exterior walls were used extensively from the 19th-century. In the early 20th century, a government sponsored initiative sought to improve the standard of housing and crofters were given grants or low-interest loans to bring their houses up to tolerable standards. More than 17,000 crofts can still be found in Scotland.
Cruck house
A type of dwelling used throughout England, Scotland and Wales during the medieval period. The frame of the structure uses "siles" or "couples" (a type of fork) for the end walls. The walls do not support the roof, which is instead carried on the cruck frame. This style of structure developed as a solution to shortages of long-span timber. Surviving examples of the cruck style of architecture are very rare in Scotland.
Peel tower
A small fortified keep or tower house. These structures were built along the Scottish-English borders as a primary means of defense.
Shieling
A type of hut, or a collection of huts, that acted as a dwelling during the Summer months. During warmer weather, women would take their livestock to higher ground in search of pasture and there they erected temporary huts constructed from stone, sod and turf. Given that shielings were built as temporary structures, few have survived intact. However, ruins of shielings can be found dotted across the Scottish highlands.
Tower house
Often constructed by the aristocratic classes during the medieval period as defensible residences. They were often built in remote or isolated areas in Scotland, Ireland and parts of Europe, especially northern Spain and included some type of fortification, typically a tower. They are most often constructed of stone. Examples of medieval tower houses in Scotland include: Crathes Castle, Craigievar Castle and Castle Fraser. In the Scottish border region, they may be known as a peel tower.

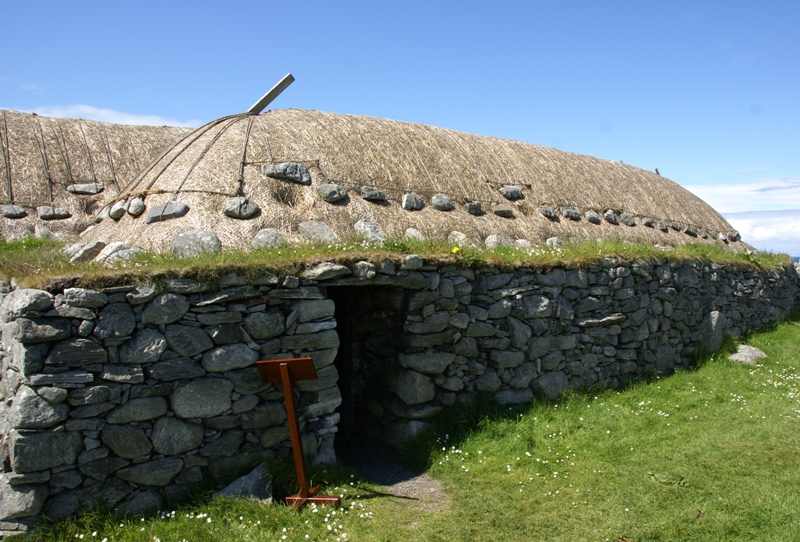
Blackhouse, Outer Hebrides, Scotland

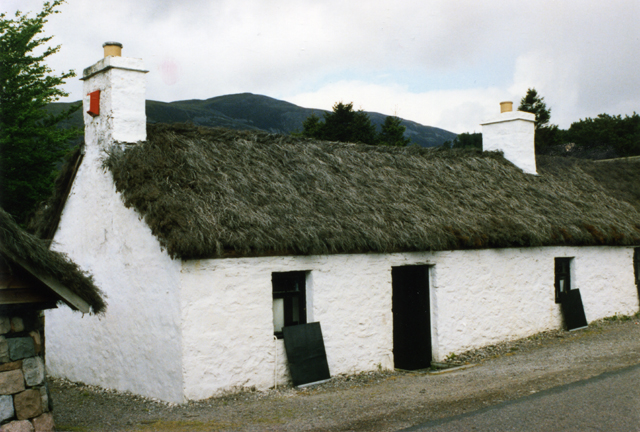
Crofters Cottage, Glencoe, Scotland

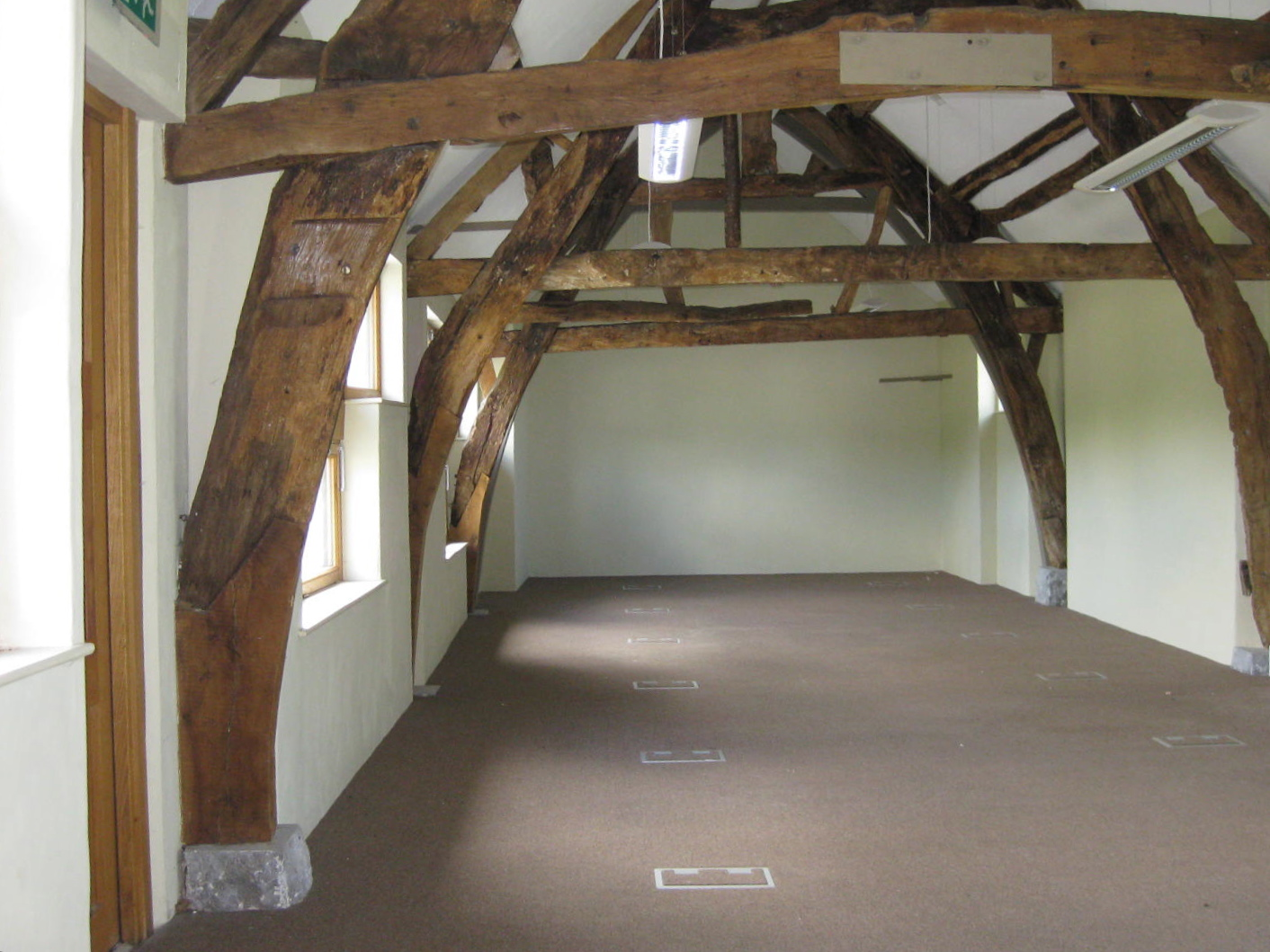
Cruck Barn at Ty-coch, Wales

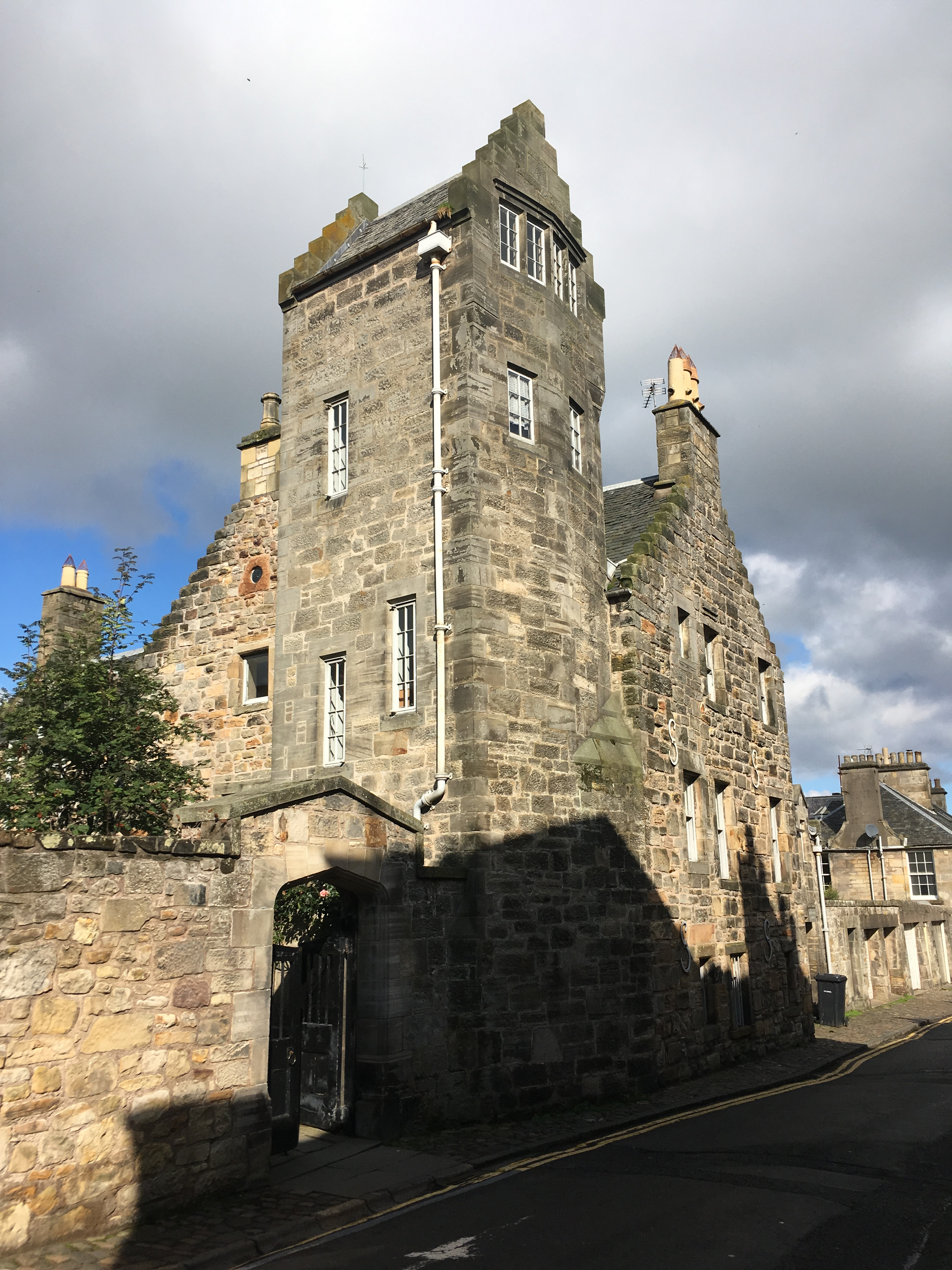
Castle Wynd House, St Andrews, Fife, Scotland, an example of a tower house

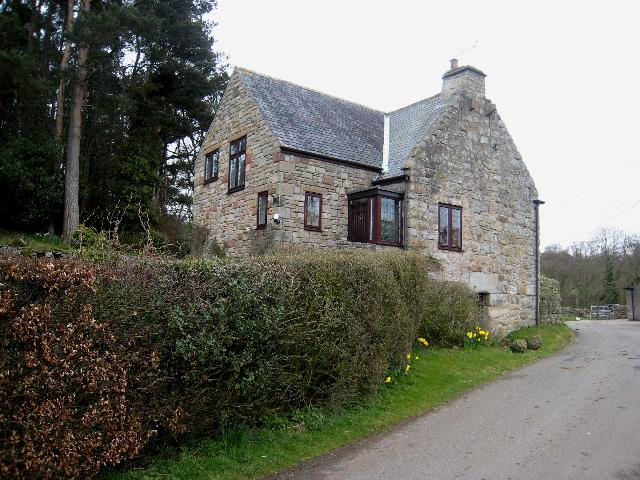
Ridley Bastle, Northumberland, England, first built in around 1600

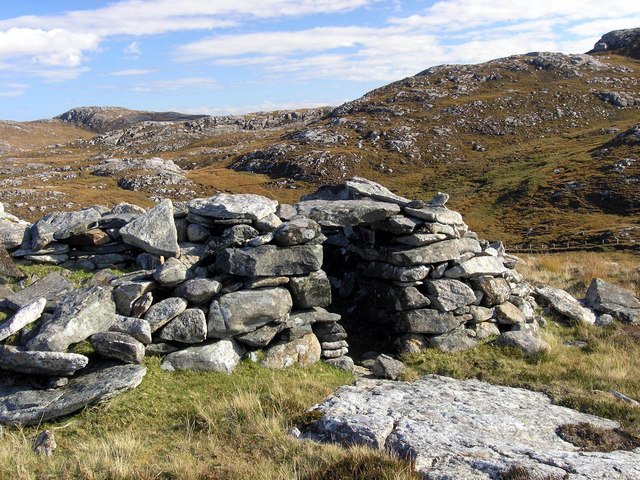
Shieling above Strome

== See also ==
- Architecture in early modern Scotland#Vernacular architecture (section)
- Architecture of Scotland
- Architecture of Scotland in the Industrial Revolution
- Architecture of Scotland in the Middle Ages
- Architecture of Scotland in the Prehistoric era
- Architecture of Scotland in the Roman era
- Croft (land)
- Crofting
- Tower houses in Britain and Ireland
- Welsh Tower houses
