= John Tait (architect) =

Scottish architect

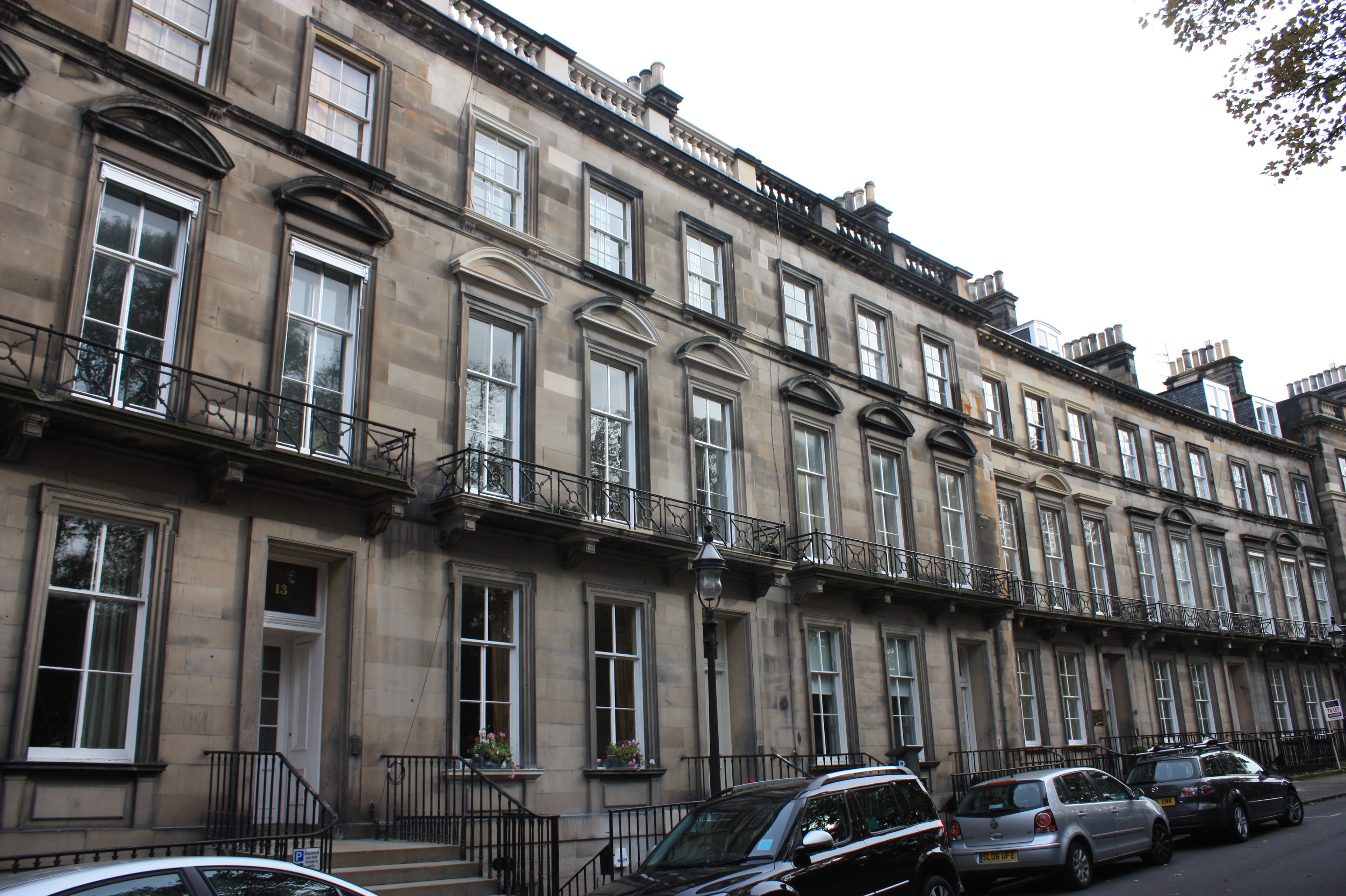
Clarendon Crescent, Edinburgh

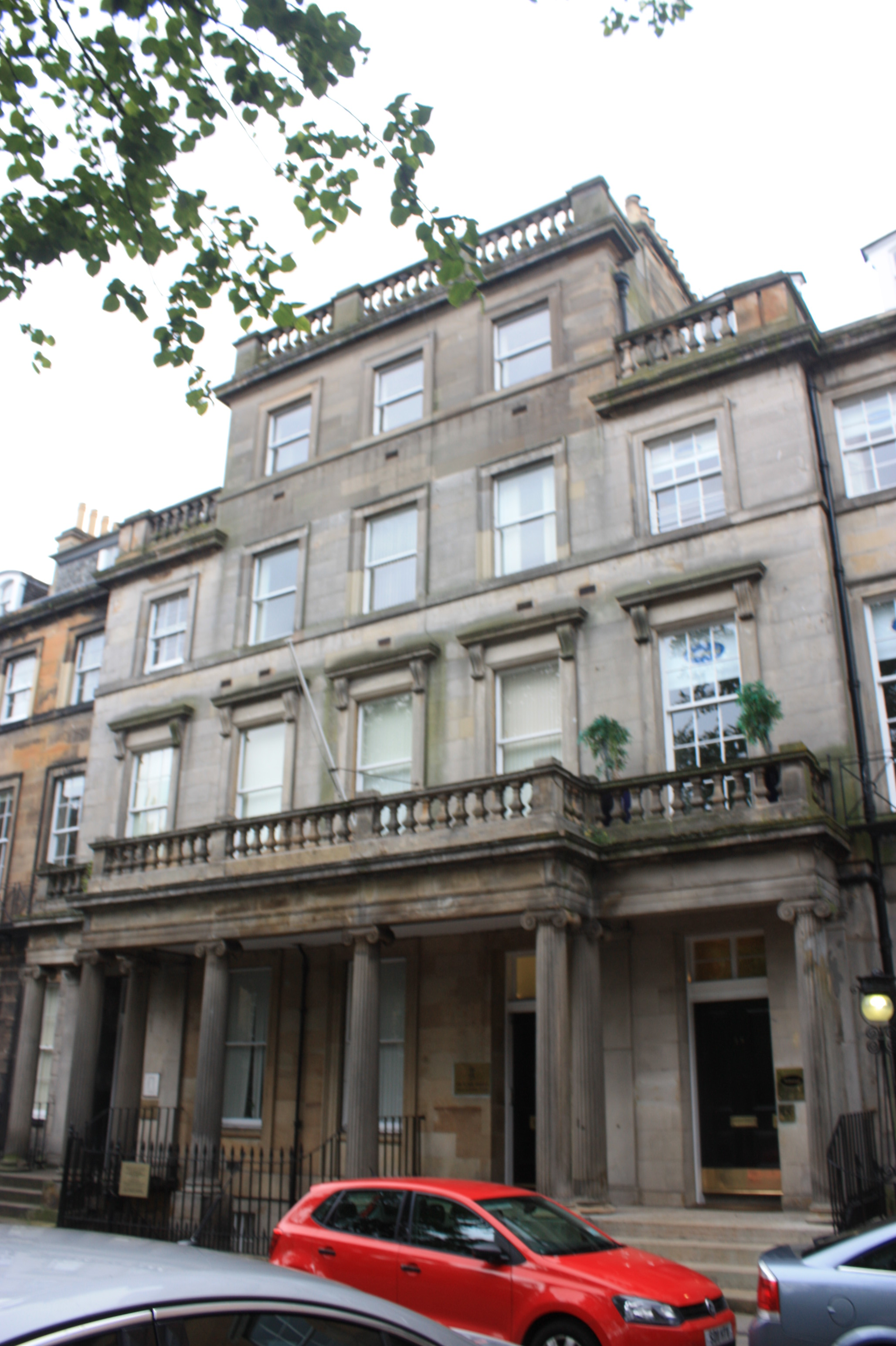
17 Rutland Square, Edinburgh

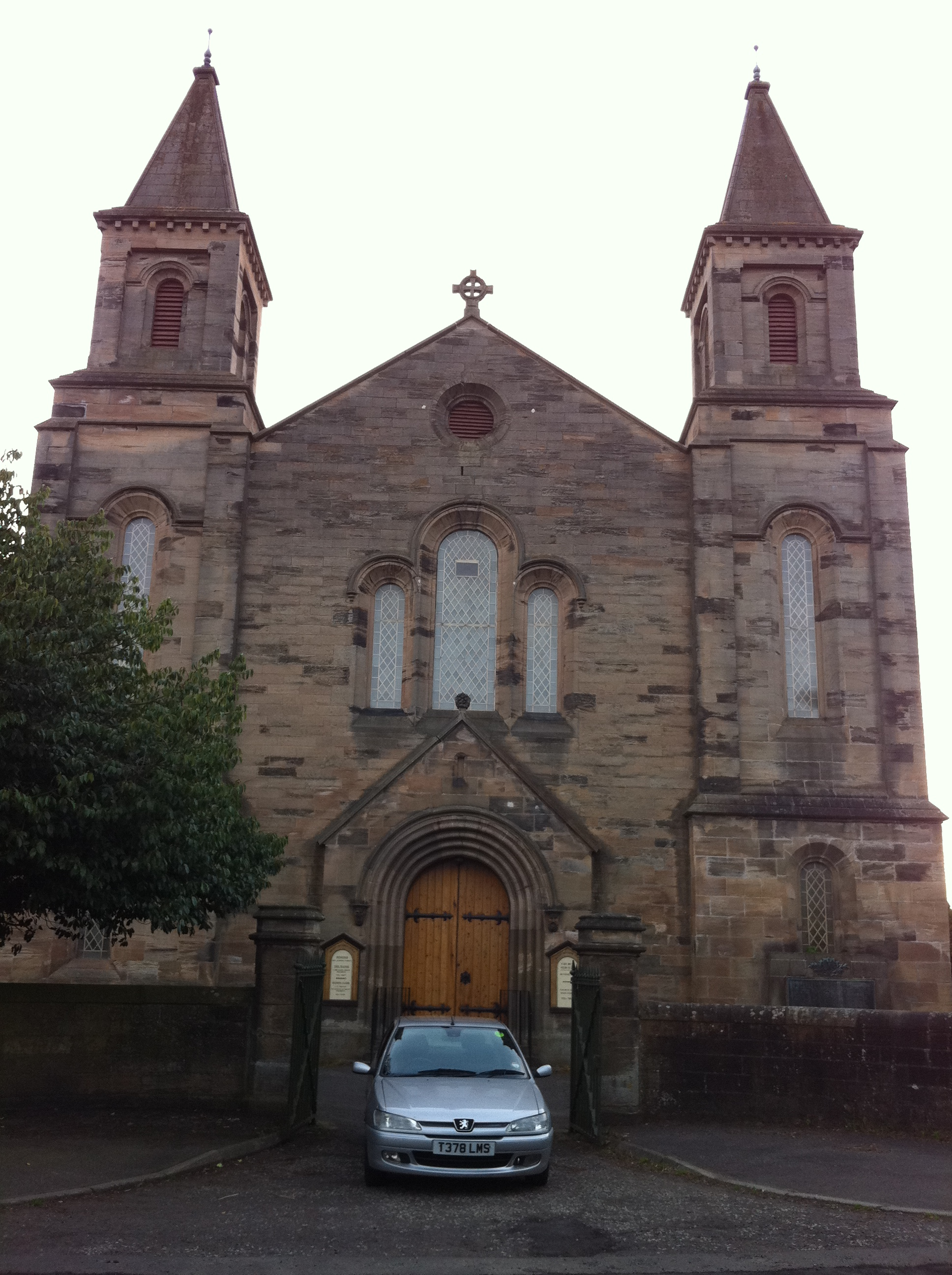
Polmont Old Parish Church

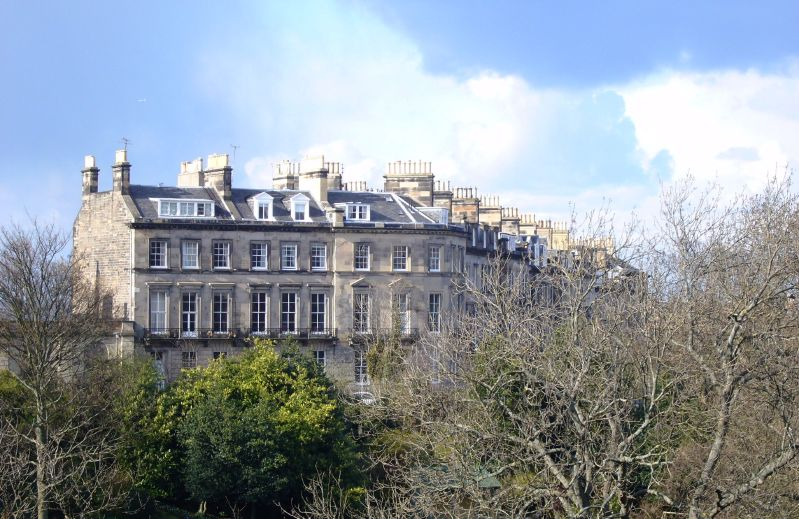
Eton Terrace

John Tait (1787-1856) was a Scottish architect operating in the first half of the 19th century responsible for several fine streets in Edinburgh all of which are listed buildings. One of his creations, 15 Rutland Square, houses the Royal Incorporation of Architects in Scotland.

== Life ==
He is believed to have been born in Edinburgh in 1787. His early years are unclear but he is thought to have apprenticed as an architect under Archibald Elliot as several of his works conclude Elliot's works.

He first appears listed in Edinburgh directories as an architect in 1826, living at 1 Mound Place in the Old Town. He worked for the Provost, John Learmonth in feuing the Learmonth area of the city, north of Dean Village, and continued in this role even after John Learmonth was forced to pass the project on to the Heriot Trust.

His clever scheme at Clarendon Crescent (named after the Earl of Clarendon) was based on William Henry Playfair's Regent Terrace, and cleverly disguises the west end of Dean Bridge by raising ground levels to create a level platform for building. The flanking streets were to be called Oxford Terrace and Cambridge Terrace, after Britain's leading universities but the name Cambridge was usurped by a development south of Edinburgh Castle and the eastern terrace was instead called Eton Terrace after Eton College.

He died at 1 Mound Place in Edinburgh on 3 November 1856 and is buried in Dean Cemetery.

== Known works ==
All works are in Edinburgh unless otherwise stated.

- Overseeing building of Rutland Street for Archibald Elliot (1819)
- Remodelling of Kerse House near Falkirk (1830) for the Earl of Zetland
- Rutland Square and Rutland Place (1830)
- 9 to 15 Inverleith Terrace (1830)
- Mill at Anstruther (1834)
- Greendykes Farm, Elie, Fife (1834)
- Elvingstone House and estate buildings, Gladsmuir, East Lothian (1837)
- Grangemouth West Church (1837)
- Parish School, Dunbog, Fife (1839)
- Polmont Parish Church (1844)
- Falkirk Grammar School (1845)
- Clarendon Crescent (1850)
- Eton Terrace (1850)
- Oxford Terrace (1855)
- Lennox Street (1855)
