= Dictionary of Scottish Architects =

Online database on architects and their works

The Dictionary of Scottish Architects is a publicly available online database that provides biographical information about all architects known to have worked in Scotland between 1660 and 1980, and lists their works. Launched in 2006, it was compiled by a team led by Professor David Walker, now Emeritus Professor in the School of Art History at the University of St Andrews.

The database includes all the known works of architects based in Scotland, but only the Scottish works of English and Irish architects are included.

The database, which is available free of charge, is now managed and fully funded by Historic Environment Scotland.
