= Elginhaugh =

- Location within Scotland
- 55.894438°N 3.0867672°W
- Type: Roman fort
- Region: Scotland
- Part of: Roman Empire

History
- Built: AD77-78/79
- Abandoned: AD86

Site notes
- Excavation dates: 1986
- Archaeologists: William S. Hanson

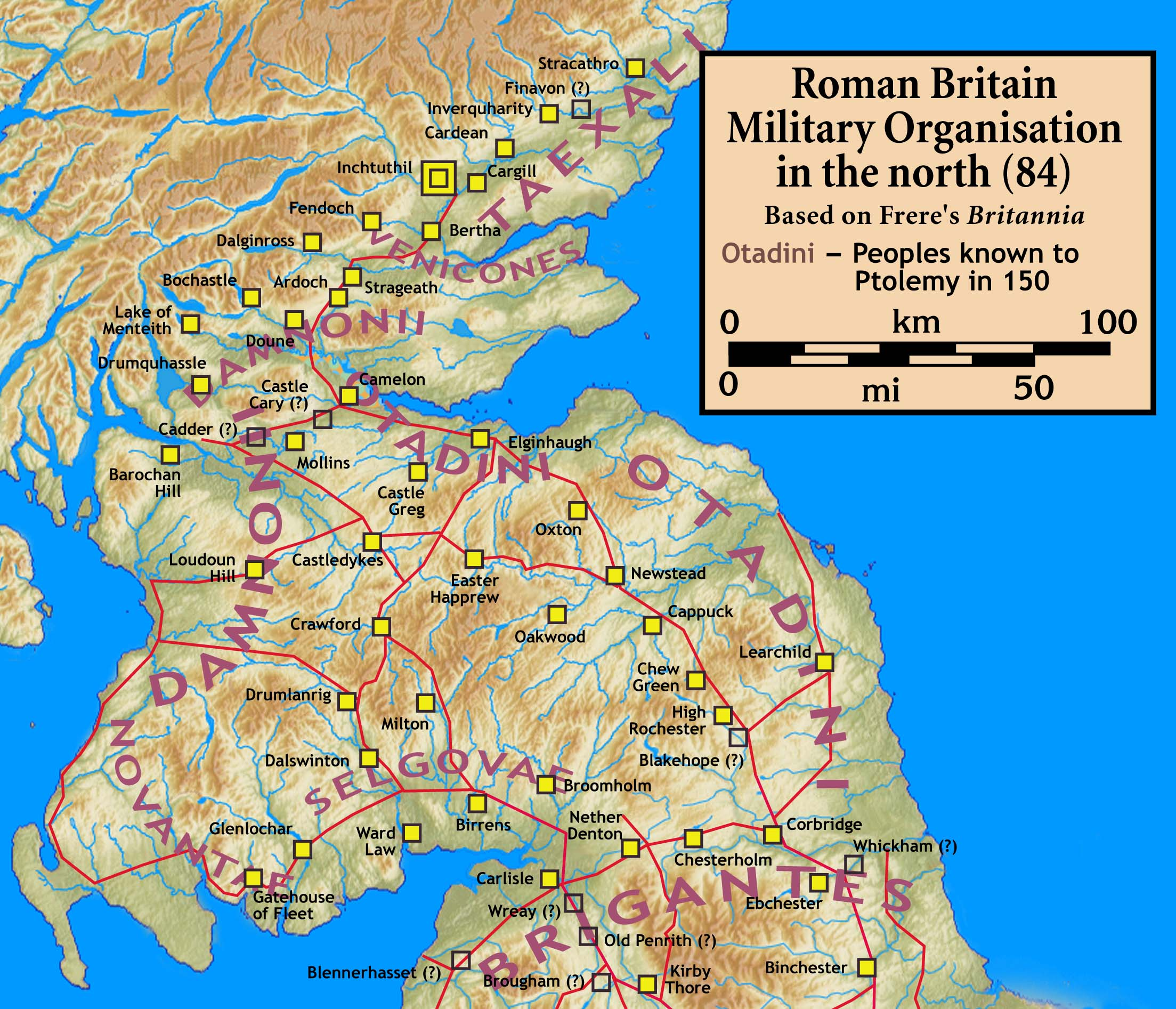
Roman forts and roads in 84 AD

Elginhaugh Roman Fort was a Roman fort of the 1st century AD, located in Midlothian, Scotland.

Elginhaugh is the most completely excavated timber-built auxiliary fort in the Roman Empire. The site of the Flavian (1st century) fort lies 1 km to the west of the modern town of Dalkeith, south-east of Edinburgh. The fort, discovered in 1979 by aerial reconnaissance, takes its name from the nearby hamlet of Elginhaugh. It was fully excavated, along with much of its large annexe, during 1986-87 by Dr William Hanson.

The excavation confirmed the broad consistency of auxiliary fort plans (in terms of general layout and the identification of specific building types), but highlighted their individual uniqueness in relation to plan detail. Of particular importance, in relation to the traditional interpretation of fort plans, is the recognition that it was the norm to house horses and men together in stable-barracks, whose number and disposition indicate that the fort cannot have housed any single standard unit, and was probably occupied by a vexillation of cavalry.

Extensive examination of the annexe highlights the ancillary, probably military, character of the activities taking place there and emphasises, in contrast with the fort, substantive changes in use over a relatively short time-span.

== History ==
The primary role of the fort was probably to guard the nearby ford where Dere Street, a vitally important north-south Roman route, crossed the river North Esk, a tributary of the River Esk, Lothian. Thus it served as a garrison post (castellum) as part of the more permanent consolidation of Roman control in Scotland during and immediately after the campaigns of Gnaeus Julius Agricola. The fort’s occupation is closely dated to c. AD 79-87 by associated coin evidence, including a foundation hoard from the principia (headquarters building).

There is also unique evidence that the site continued to function as a collection centre for animals after the garrison had departed: the interior of the fort was cobbled over, two additional wells were dug and ditches inserted across the annexe to funnel livestock.

== Finds ==
The site provides a very precise dating horizon for a wide range of associated artefactual material. Of particular importance is the evidence of the local manufacture of coarse pottery and indication that the garrison used hand-held artillery pieces. An extensive programme of environmental analysis provided insight into issues of local environment and food supply.

=== The coin hoard ===
The Elginhaugh coin hoard is a group of 45 denarii which provides the terminus post quem dating of AD 77-78 for the construction of the fort and was argued by the excavators to represent a foundation deposit for the Principia. The validity of this dating has recently been called into question by David Woolliscroft, who argues that the coin hoard is unsuitable for this purpose as only 21 of the 45 coins in the hoard were actually found in a single, stacked deposit - of these, the latest was dated to AD 71. The dating of AD 77-78 comes from a single coin closely associated with the hoard, but not securely from within it.
