= Architecture of Glasgow =

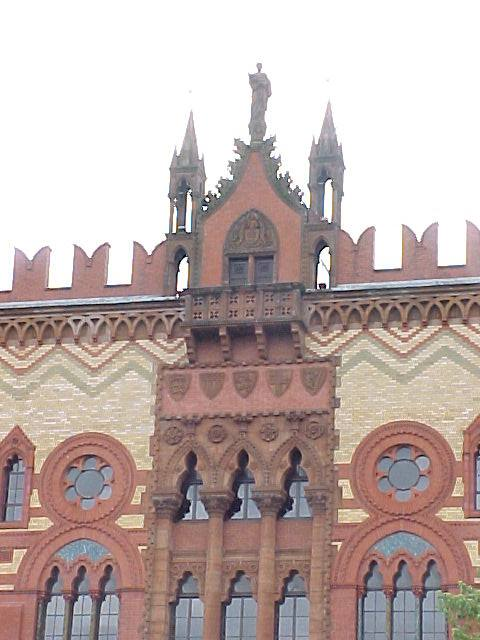
The western façade of the Moorish Revival Templeton's Carpet Factory.

The city of Glasgow, Scotland is particularly noted for its 19th-century Victorian architecture, and the early-20th-century "Glasgow Style", as developed by Charles Rennie Mackintosh.

Very little of medieval Glasgow remains, the two main landmarks from this period being the 15th-century Provand's Lordship and 12th-century St. Mungo's Cathedral. St. Mungo's Cathedral, also known as the High Kirk and Glasgow Cathedral, is the oldest building in Glasgow and is an example of Scottish Gothic architecture.

The vast majority of the city as seen today dates from the 19th and early 20th century. As a result, Glasgow has a large heritage of Victorian and Edwardian architecture: the Glasgow City Chambers; the main building of the University of Glasgow, designed by Sir George Gilbert Scott; and the Kelvingrove Art Gallery and Museum, designed by Sir John W. Simpson are examples.

== Glasgow Style ==
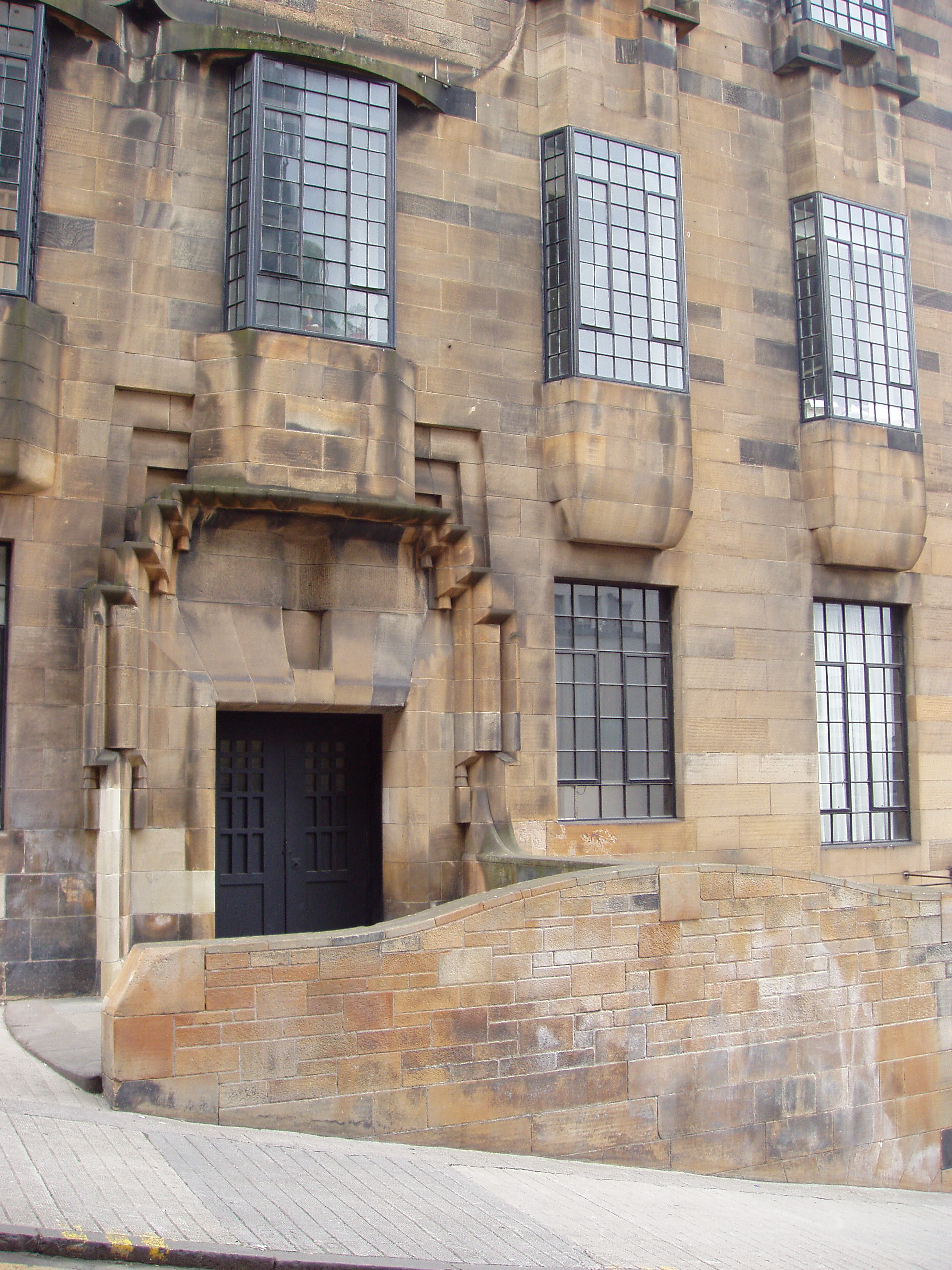
Western façade of Charles Rennie Mackintosh's Glasgow School of Art.

The city is notable for architecture designed by Charles Rennie Mackintosh (1868–1928). Mackintosh was an architect and designer in the Arts and Crafts movement and the main exponent of Art Nouveau in the United Kingdom, designing Glasgow buildings such as the Glasgow School of Art, Willow Tearooms and the Scotland Street School. Also designed by Mackintosh is the Queen's Cross Church, the only church by the artist to be built.

== Victorian era ==
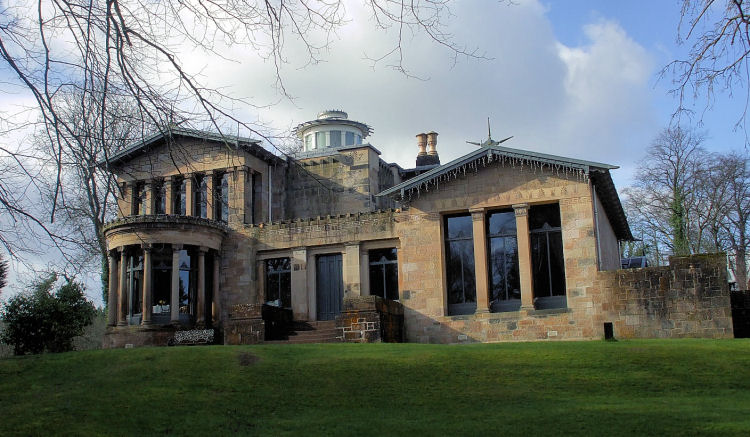
The Holmwood House villa in Cathcart, designed by Alexander "Greek" Thomson.

Another architect who had an impact on the city's appearance was Alexander Thomson (1817–1875). Thomson produced a style of architecture based on fundamentalist classicism that gave him the nickname "Greek". Examples of Thomson's work can be found over the city, with notable examples including the Holmwood House villa and St. Vincent Street Church.

The buildings reflect the wealth and self-confidence of the residents of the "Second City of the Empire". Glasgow generated wealth from trade and the industries that developed from the Industrial Revolution. The Templeton's carpet factory on Glasgow Green was designed to resemble the Doge's Palace in Venice and epitomises Glaswegians' desire to demonstrate architectural opulence during this era.

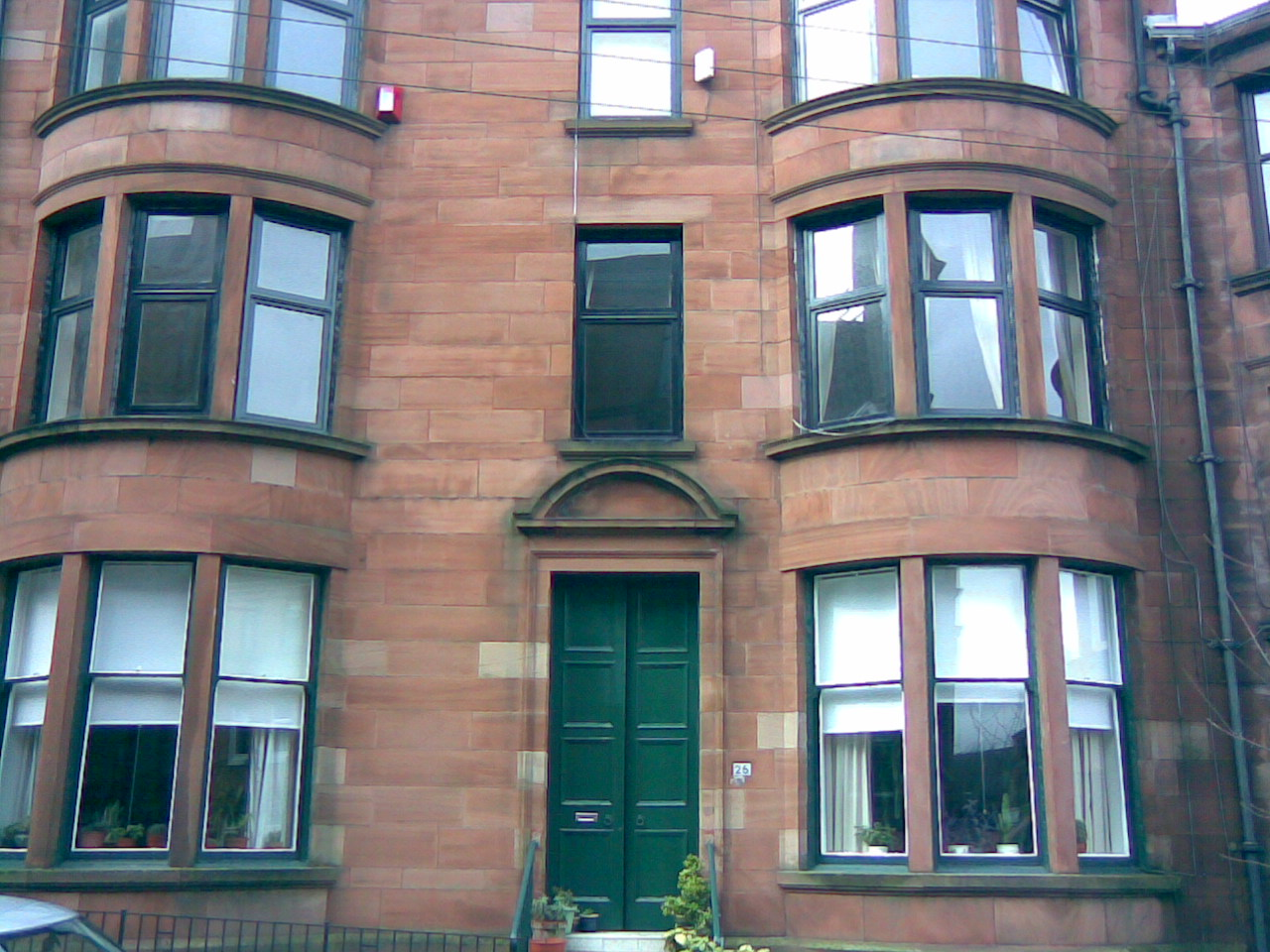
Typical red sandstone Glasgow south side tenement (Shawlands).

Many of the city's buildings were built with red or blond sandstone, but during the industrial era those colours disappeared under a pervasive black layer of soot and pollutants from the furnaces, until the Clean Air Act was introduced in 1956. In recent years many of these buildings have been cleaned and restored to their original appearance.

=== Ecclesiastical architecture ===
Many important historicist churches were built in Victorian Glasgow, including the St. Vincent Street Church and the Romanesque Revival Garnethill Synagogue.

== Modern era ==
Modern buildings in Glasgow include the Glasgow Royal Concert Hall, and along the banks of the Clyde are the Glasgow Science Centre and the Scottish Exhibition and Conference Centre, whose Clyde Auditorium was designed by Sir Norman Foster, and is known as the "Armadillo". Zaha Hadid won a competition in 2004 to design the new Riverside Museum to house the Glasgow Museum of Transport

Glasgow's historical and modern architectural traditions were celebrated in 1999 when the city was designated UK City of Architecture and Design, winning the accolade over Liverpool and Edinburgh.

== Gallery ==
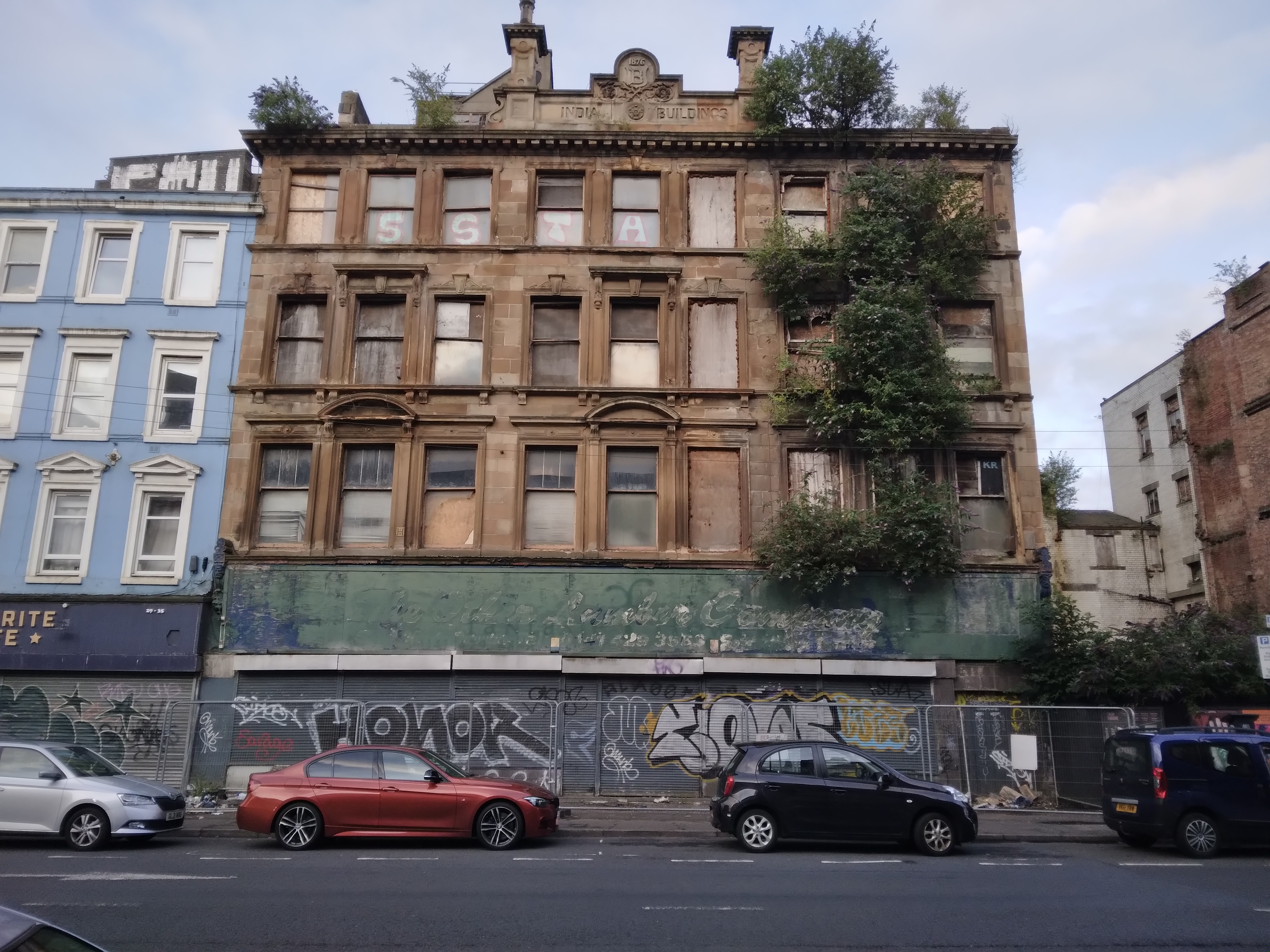
India Buildings, Bridge Street (1876), demolished in 2024

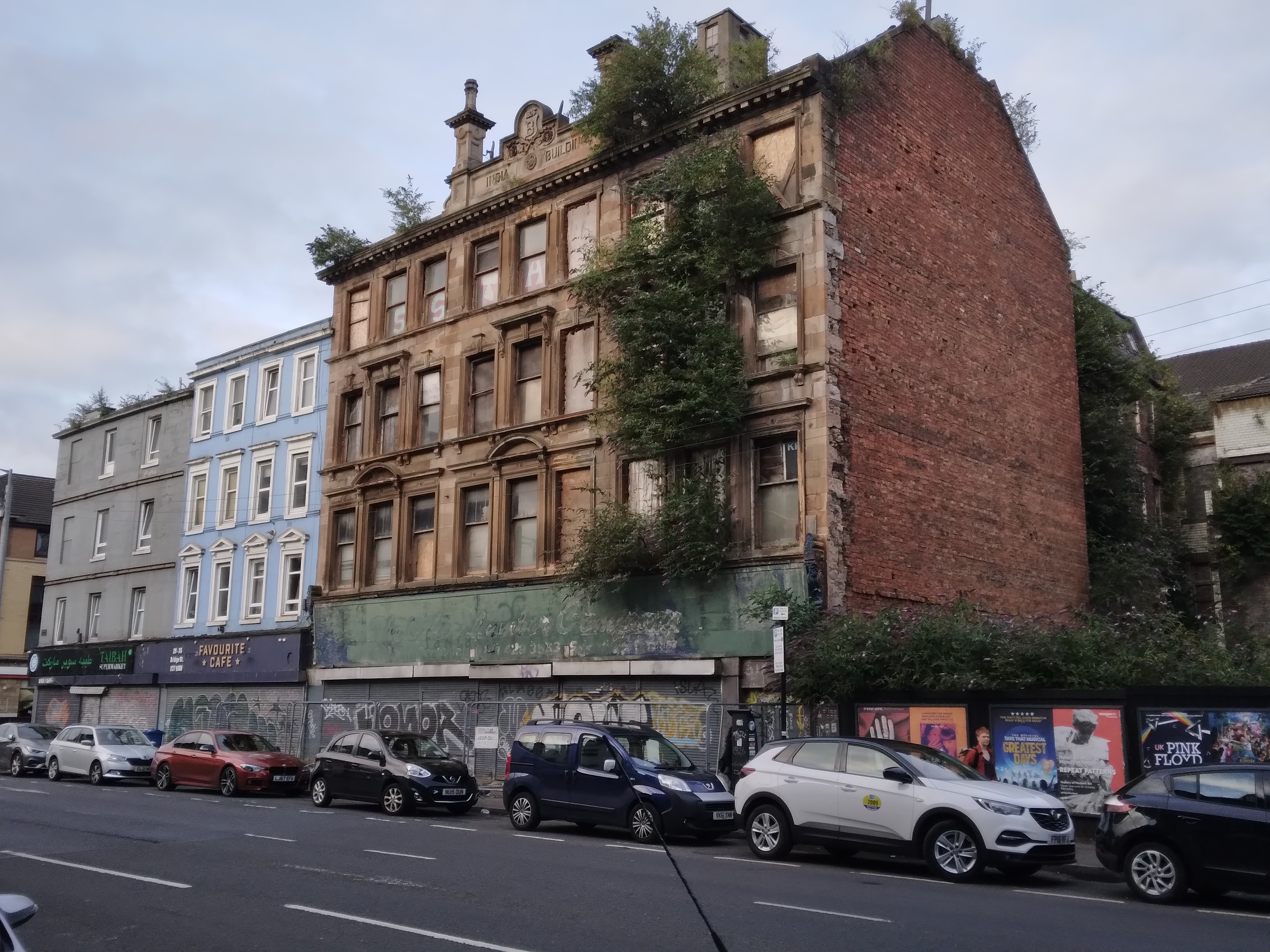
India Buildings (1876), alternative angle

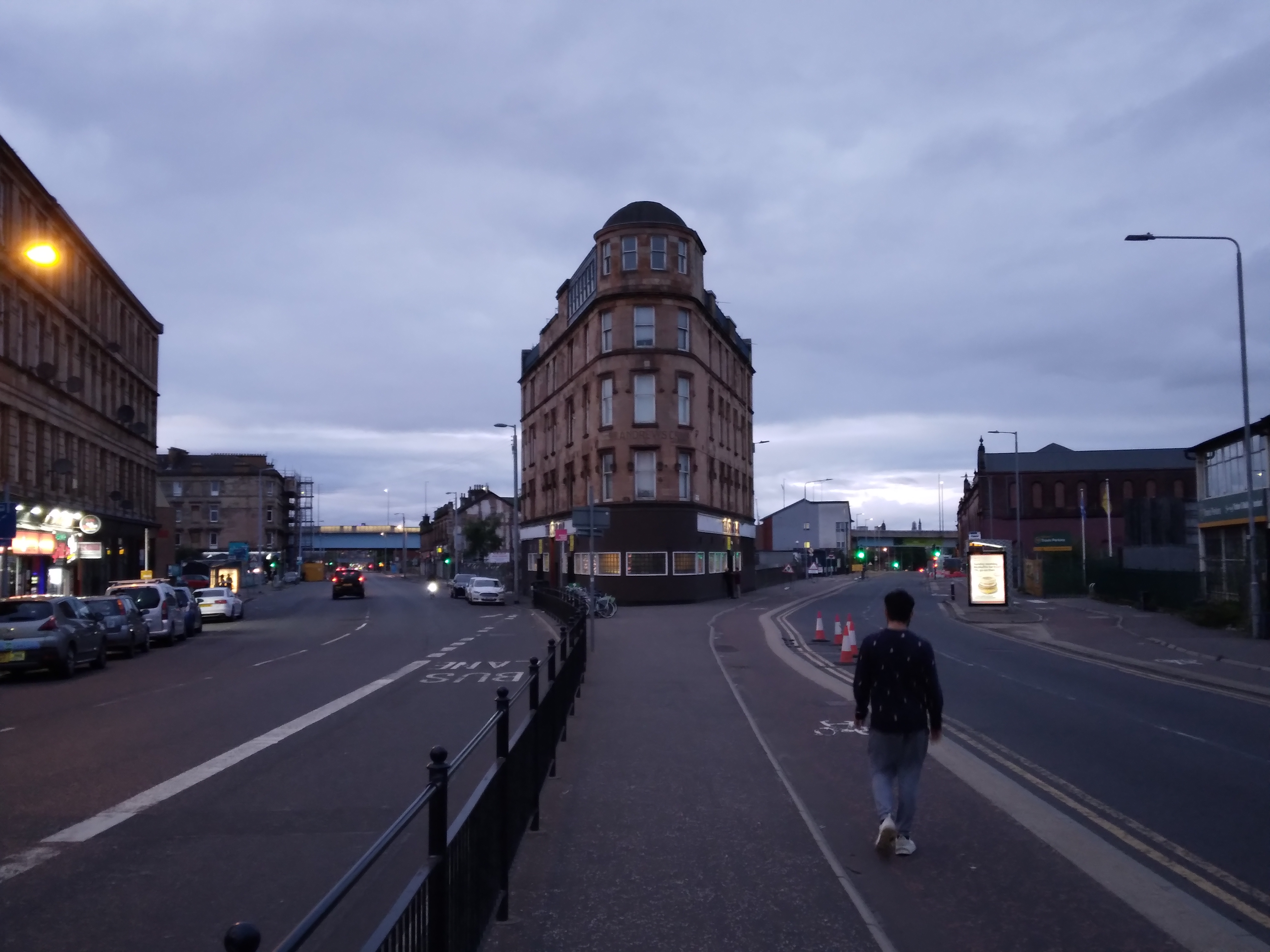
The Star Bar corner "gushet" pub in the St Andrew's Cross area of the city

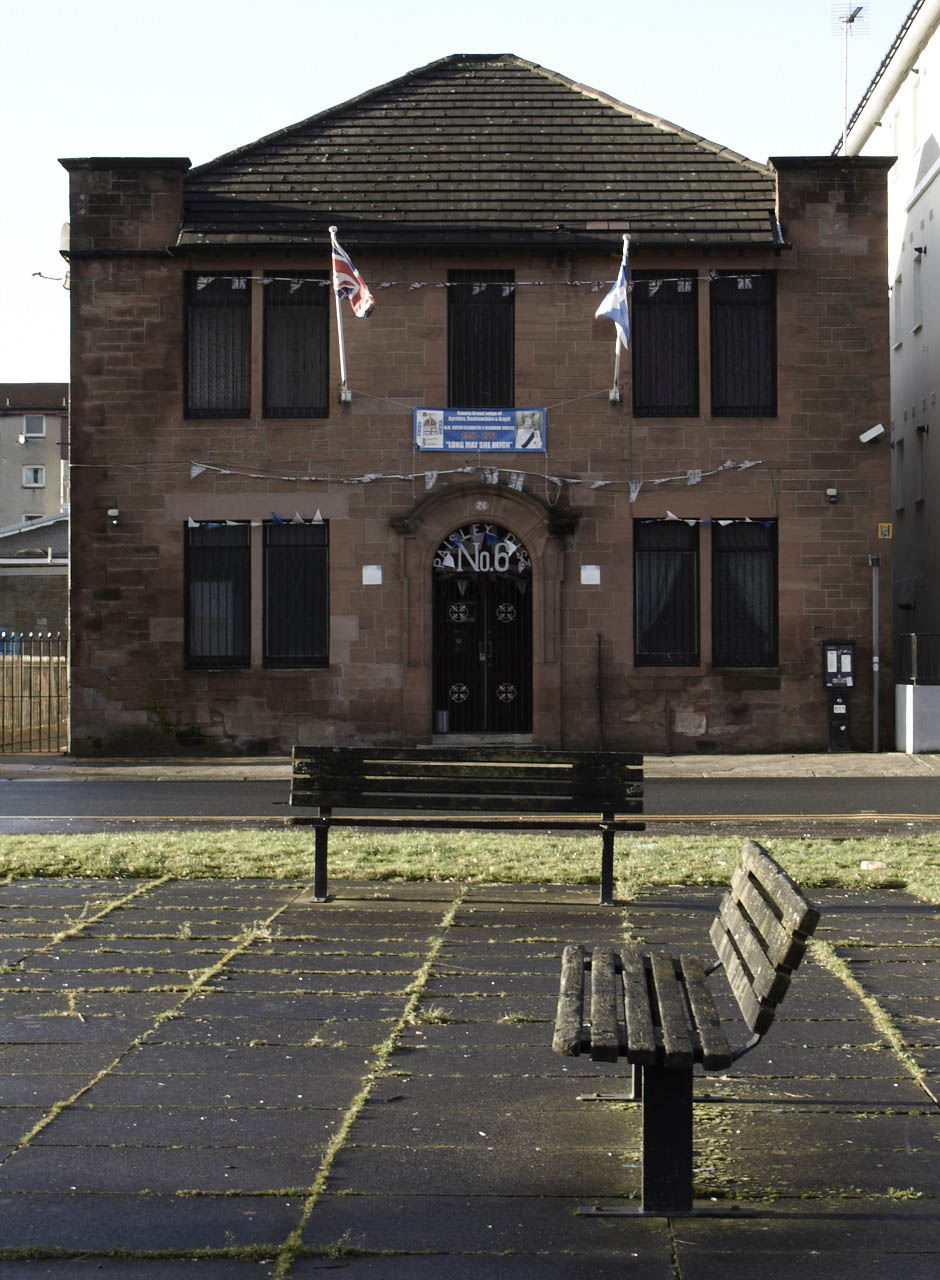
Castle Street Orange Halls Grand Lodge No 6 Paisley
