= Gavin Stamp =

British architectural historian (1948–2017)

- Born: 15 March 1948
- Died: 30 December 2017 (aged 69)
- Education: Dulwich College
- Alma mater: Gonville and Caius College, Cambridge
- Occupations: Architectural historian; teacher; writer; conservation activist; commentator
- Writing career
- Pen name: Piloti

Gavin Mark Stamp (15 March 1948 – 30 December 2017) was a British writer, television presenter and architectural historian.

== Education ==
Stamp was educated at Dulwich College in South London from 1959 to 1967 as part of the "Dulwich Experiment", then at Gonville and Caius College, Cambridge, where he obtained a PhD in 1978 with a thesis entitled George Gilbert Scott, junior, architect, 1839–1897.

== Life and career ==
Stamp's career was one of largely independent journalism, writing, lecturing and polemic on architectural topics. Under the pseudonym "Piloti", he wrote the "Nooks & Corners" architecture criticism column in Private Eye from 1978 until his death, including giving the Hugh Casson Award for worst new building of the year. He regularly contributed essays on architecture to the fine arts and collector's magazine Apollo. From 1990 he taught architectural history, latterly as Professor, at the Mackintosh School of Architecture at the Glasgow School of Art. He bought and restored a terrace house that Alexander "Greek" Thomson designed for a local builder in Moray Place, Glasgow. In 2003, he resigned from the school and reverted to being an independent scholar and was widely invited as a guest lecturer.

He was a long-standing trustee and for a time chairman of the Twentieth Century Society, a registered charity which promotes the appreciation of modern architecture and the conservation of Britain's architectural heritage. He was also active in the Victorian Society in various capacities over five decades. He lent his support as lecturer, journalist and lobbyist to a wide range of architectural conservation causes on behalf of buildings in many styles, especially those he felt were "worthy but unpopular causes". As such, he was prominent in campaigns to save buildings such as Battersea Power Station and Bankside Power Station (now Tate Modern) which were threatened with destruction.

== Television appearances ==
Stamp presented a number of programmes about architecture for Channel 5. In 2005 he presented Pevsner's Cities: Liverpool and Pevsner's Cities: Newcastle, and in 2006 Pevsner's Cities: Oxford; each programme profiled the cities with reference to the writings of architectural historian Nikolaus Pevsner. In 2007 he presented a five-part architectural travel series Gavin Stamp's Orient Express, in which he travelled by train along the original Orient Express route, stopping off to look at architecture and to see how the history of Eastern Europe is told in its buildings.

Stamp regularly made television appearances as an expert interviewee: in 1986 he appeared in A Sense of the Past, a 6-part series for schools produced by Yorkshire Television about the relationship between buildings and local history; in 1990 he was interviewed for Design Classics: The Telephone Box, a favourite subject of Stamp's and one he wrote about (he inspired the listing of many telephone kiosks); in 1995 he appeared as guest expert in an episode of One Foot in the Past about Isambard Kingdom Brunel; and in 2003 he was interviewed by Paul Binski for an episode of Channel 5's Divine Designs which profiled Alexander "Greek" Thomson's St. Vincent Street Free Church in Glasgow.

== Legacy ==
National Life Stories conducted an oral history interview (C467/48) with Stamp in 2000 for its Architects Lives' collection, now held by the British Library.

Stamp's archive is held at the Paul Mellon Centre in London, and includes correspondence, images, research notes, newspaper and journal cuttings, draft publications, etc, from throughout his life. It was donated to the Centre in 2018.

== Personal life ==
Stamp was the son of Norah and Barry Stamp (the last Chairman of Cave Austin and Company). He was married to Alexandra Artley from 1982 until 2007. Their daughter Cecilia is a jewellery designer, and their other daughter, Agnes, works for Country Life.

He married his second wife, biographer and cultural historian Rosemary Hill, on 10 April 2014.

Stamp was a life-long member of the Church of England and loved its traditional forms of liturgy and architecture. In his last years he worshipped at St Hilda's church, Crofton Park in South London.

Stamp was diagnosed with prostate cancer and underwent a course of chemotherapy in 2017. He died on 30 December 2017.

== Books ==
- Temples of Power: Architecture of Electricity in London (1979). London: Gardners. ISBN 978-0-9502154-9-5
- Britain in the Thirties (1979). London: Architectural Design. ISBN 978-0-8478-5311-3
- (with Colin Amery) Victorian Buildings of London, 1837–1887: An Illustrated Guide (1980). London: Architectural Press. ISBN 978-0-85139-500-5
- (with Colin Amery and Margaret Richardson) Lutyens: The Work of the English Architect Sir Edwin Lutyens (1981). London: Arts Council of Great Britain. ISBN 978-0-728-70303-2
- The Great Perspectivists (1982). London: Trefoil. ISBN 978-0-86294-002-7
- The Changing Metropolis: Earliest Photographs of London 1839–1879 (1984). London: Viking. ISBN 978-0-670-80058-2
- (with Andre Goulancourt) The English House, 1860–1914: The Flowering of English Domestic Architecture (1986). London: Faber. ISBN 978-0-571-13047-4
- Telephone Boxes (1989). London: Chatto & Windus. ISBN 978-0-7011-3366-5
- (with Sam McKinstry) "Greek" Thomson: Neo-Classical Architectural Theory, Buildings and Interiors (1993). Edinburgh University Press. OCLC 80434139
- Personal and Professional Recollections of George Gilbert Scott (1995). Stamford: Paul Watkins. ISBN 978-1-871615-26-5
- (with Phil Sayer) Alexander "Greek" Thomson (1999). London: L. King. ISBN 978-1-85669-161-1
- Edwin Lutyens: Country Houses (2001). London: Aurum. ISBN 978-1-85410-763-3
- An Architect of Promise: George Gilbert Scott, Jr. (2002). Donington: Shaun Tyas. ISBN 978-1-900289-51-1
- (co-editor, with Andrew Hopkins) Lutyens Abroad: The Work of Sir Edwin Lutyens outside the British Isles (2002). London: The British School at Rome. ISBN 9780904152371
- The Memorial to the Missing of the Somme (2006). London: Profile. ISBN 978-1-86197-811-0
- Britain's Lost Cities (2007). London: Aurum. ISBN 978-1-84513-264-4
- Anti-Ugly: Excursions in English Architecture and Design (2013). London: Aurum. ISBN 9781781311233 [collected writings first published in Apollo magazine]
- Gothic in the Steam Age (2015). London: Aurum. ISBN 978-1-78131-124-0
- Interwar: British Architecture 1919–39 (2024). London: Profile Books. ISBN 9781800817395

== Articles ==
- (with André Goulancourt) The English House 1860–1914 Catalogue to an exhibition at The Building Centre, co-published International Architect and Building Centre Trust, 1980
- Robert Weir Schultz – Architect – and his work for the Marquesses of Bute – An Essay, Mount Stuart, 1981
- (Foreword) The Architecture of the Halifax Piece Hall 1775–1779, Phillip Smithies, Halifax, 1988
- (Contributor & Introduction) Owen Williams Projects, Comentari sobre l'exposico: Craig Ellwood, Carlo Mollino, Jean Prouve, Owen Williams, Pares Department de Projectes d'Arquitectura, Catalunya, April 1995
- "Sacred Architecture in a Secular Century" in The Twentieth Century Church, ed. Jeffery, Twentieth Century Society, London 1998
- (Preface) The Cathedrals of England three volumes, The Folio Society, London, 2005
- "Ian Nairn" in The Heroic Period of Conservation, ed. Harwood, Powers, Twentieth Century Society, London 2004
- "An architect of the Entente Cordiale: Eugene Bourdin (1870–1916)" in Architectural Heritage XV, Architectural Heritage Society of Scotland, Edinburgh, 2004
- (Preface) The Cathedrals of England three volumes, The Folio Society, London, 2005
- Edwin Lutyens: Profilo di un Architteto, Umberto Allemandi & Co, Torino, 2008
- "Suburban Affinities" in The Seventies – Rediscovering a lost decade of British Architecture ed. Cherry, The Twentieth Century Society, London 2012
