= The Egyptian Halls =

Listed building in Glasgow, Scotland

Coordinates: 55°51′35.50″N 4°15′24.92″W

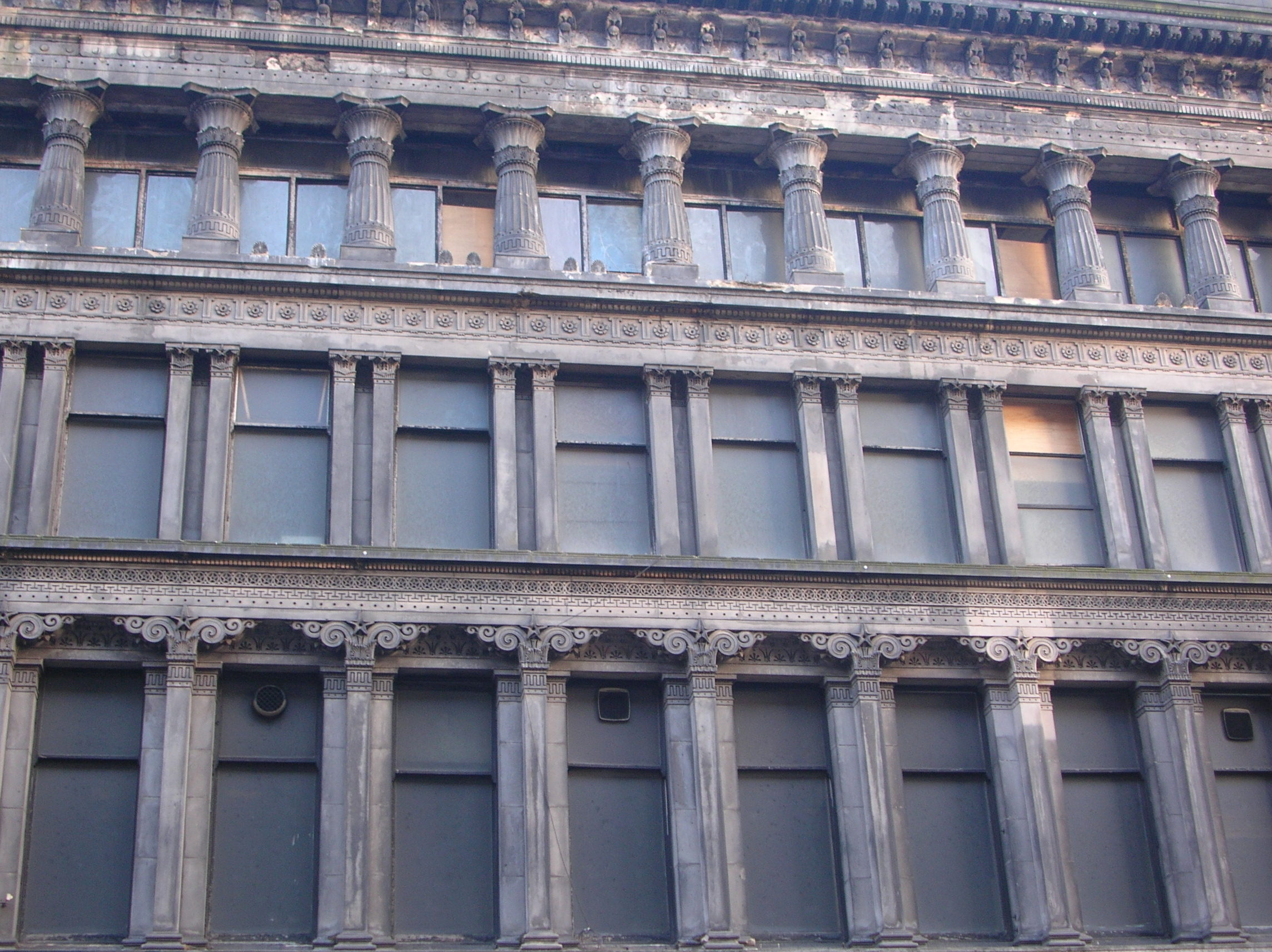
The Egyptian Halls frontage on Union Street in 2005, prior to scaffolding

The Egyptian Halls is a category A listed building at 84–100 Union Street, Glasgow, Scotland. It was built between 1870–72 and designed by Alexander "Greek" Thomson. Other than some retailers on the ground floor, the building is currently unoccupied and despite several attempts at restoration, it remains in a perilous state. As of March 2024 it was reported the building, now covered in scaffolding for fifteen years, was for sale.

== History ==
Work started on the Egyptian Halls in March 1870 to provide new commercial premises for James Robertson, an iron manufacturer, and was completed in 1872. Built using cast iron and stone, the Egyptian Halls was one of the last major projects of Alexander Thomson. The building broke many of the rules of the time; thick stone columns normally found at ground level were on the top floor. The building is built on four storeys. The ground floor was occupied by shops with fully glazed wide bays. The first floor features eighteen window bays divided by square columns with a flowing scroll capital. On the second floor, shorter couple columns are positioned exactly above the first floor columns, again above these columns is a decorative entablature with a Roman-style decoration. Finally, on the third floor is a plinth with dwarf columns and pseudo-Egyptian lotus flower capitals. Behind these columns is a continuous glazed screen, which is not fixed to these columns. Topping these columns is another entablature with a cornice. This 'attic' room is lit by a series of sloping skylights.

The name of the building seems to be a misnomer as there is very little Egyptian influence in its design. Instead, it is more closely modelled on Greek classical architecture, in particular the Corinthian order of the Tower of the Winds in Athens, which was Thomson's ideal of design. It is speculated that it takes its title from the earlier Egyptian Hall in Piccadilly, London, which was the precursor for the large multi-purpose commercial premises of Thomson's building. It is also speculated that some of the shops may have been Egyptian-themed. In addition to the shops, the building featured a lecture room, bazaar and a large central hall where displays of paintings and antiquities were staged, including the display of the complete Egyptian tomb of Thebes.

Thomson was very proud of his work. Writing to his brother George, he commented:

"He [the client] is very proud of the building – a writer in The Architect says of it – this is probably the Architect's most successful effort, and we doubt if its equal, for originality, grandeur of treatment or imposing effect, could be found in any City, not excepting the Metropolis itself."

The building has been described as one of the finest in Glasgow and, according to the secretary of the Royal Incorporation of Architects in Scotland, is the finest surviving example of an Alexander Thomson commercial building and is of international importance. It has been protected as a category A listed building since 1966.

== Current status ==
In common with many other buildings of this era, such as Thomson's Caledonian Road Church and the St Vincent Street Church, it fell into disrepair in the second half of the 20th century. The upper floors were left vacant in the early 1980s and by the early 1990s the building was in such poor condition that the council issued a repair order to a Hong Kong restaurateur who owned part of the upper floors. This did not stop the decay and in 1995 further repairs were undertaken following an 'Urgent Repairs Notice'. In 1996 Glasgow City Council announced a compulsory purchase order (CPO) on the building. In subsequent years a number of schemes were proposed to restore the building, but legal wrangles with the building's owners, who were contesting the CPO, led to further delays. In July 2000, Dundee businessman Derek Souter and his company Union Street Developments (USD) acquired a stake in the property and announced plans to restore it, but funding problems led to further delays.

In January 2003, Glasgow City Council bought the building just before its CPO was due to expire in the hope that USD would find the funding to complete the restoration. At that time it was estimated that it would cost £3.8 million to repair the building. USD bought the entire building in the summer of 2008, but other than work to prevent further decay little had been done on the building. In June 2010 ambitious new plans to redevelop the building into a 250-bedroom hotel, with hotel group Accor taking the franchise, were announced. As part of this redevelopment there were plans to build a new rooftop extension and new ground-floor retail units. The cost of this scheme was put at £17 million, with Glasgow City Council asked to contribute £1 million to the conversion. Further wrangling over funding continued, with the owner warning in February 2011 that the building might be demolished if further funds were not committed. Planning approval and listed building consent was given for a scheme which has secured funding for conversion to a 114-bed four-star hotel. In February 2013, subsidy was being sought for work to the ground floor, however these plans did not proceed.

By late 2019 the building had been shrouded by scaffolding for a decade, with no action having been taken. It was added to the shortlist of the fourteen most significant endangered buildings in Europe by Europa Nostra. In May 2021, the Scottish Civic Trust established The Egyptian Halls SCIO, which aims to acquire ownership of the building and undertake a full restoration programme. Its trustees include Paul Sweeney MSP, John Nicolson MP, and Murray Grigor.

In March 2024 it was reported that the building, still behind scaffolding (covered initially by oversized billboard-style banner, then by an image of the façade after council objection to the 'excessive advertising' 13 years after its introduction, with the owners claiming the revenue was used in the upkeep of the preservation measures) had gone back up for sale.

== See also ==
- List of Category A listed buildings in Glasgow
