= George Thomson (botanist) =

Scottish missionary and botanist

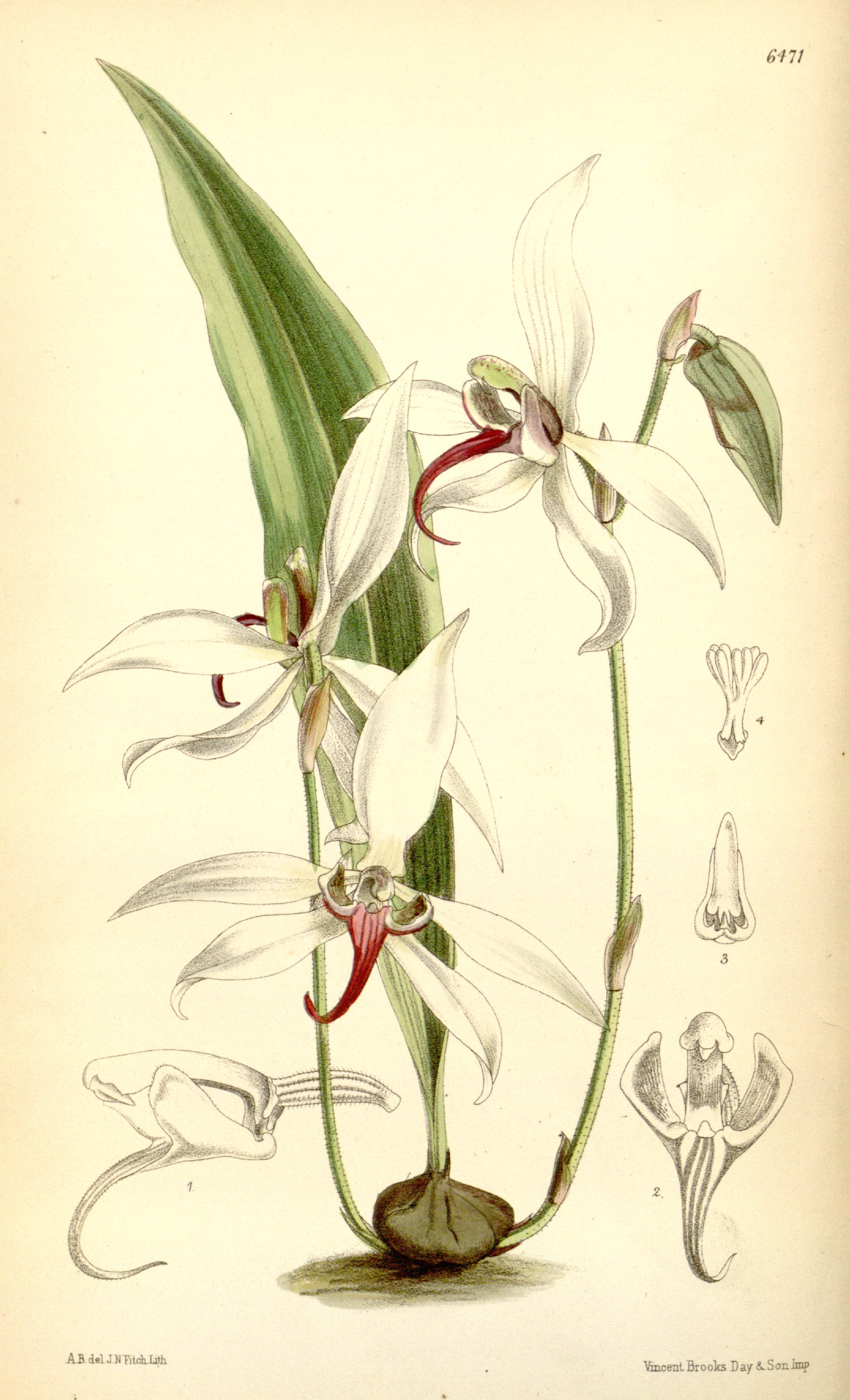
Pachystoma thomsonianum

George Thomson (26 May 1819 – 14 December 1878) was a Scottish missionary in Cameroon who collected plants to send to the Royal Botanic Gardens, Kew and to the British Museum.

Thomson was born in Balfron, 16 miles north of Glasgow and trained as an architect. His brother, Alexander Greek Thomson (1817–1875) was an eminent Glaswegian architect and architectural theorist who was a pioneer in sustainable building. George and Alexander were partners in an architectural practice in Glasgow early in their careers.

In 1870, George Thomson was sent by the Baptist Church to West Africa as a missionary in Limbe, Cameroon (then known as "Victoria"), where he combined his religious activities with a passion for botany. In 1877, he was host to the German botanist, Wilhelm Kalbreyer who had been sent by James Veitch & Sons of Chelsea, London to search for plants in "that unhealthy region". Amongst the plants discovered by Kalbreyer was an epiphytic orchid of the genus Pachystoma, which was named Pachystoma thomsonianum in Thomson's honour. It is now known as Ancistrochilus thomsonianus.

Thomson died in Victoria from malaria on 14 December 1878.

His nephew, Rev. William Cooper Thomson (1829–1878) was a missionary in Nigeria, after whose first wife the bleeding-heart vine Clerodendrum thomsoniae was named.
