= The Lighthouse, Glasgow =

Building in Scotland

The Lighthouse
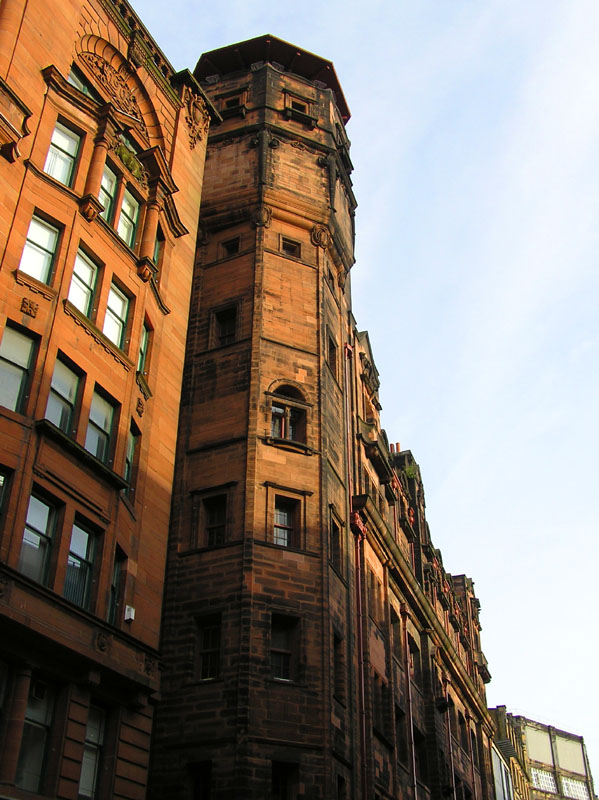

- Location within Glasgow council area

General information
- Location: 11 Mitchell Lane, Glasgow, Scotland
- Coordinates: 55.8597°N 4.2555°W

The Lighthouse is the renamed, A-listed conversion of the former offices of the Glasgow Herald newspaper. Completed in 1895, it was designed by the architect Charles Rennie Mackintosh.

The Lighthouse was Scotland's Centre for Design and Architecture. It was opened as part of Glasgow's status as the UK City of Architecture and Design in 1999 and closed due to the COVID-19 pandemic in 2020. In November 2025, it was reported that the building had been leased to Sustainable Ventures.

== 1893 - 1980: Design and use by the Glasgow Herald ==
The building was designed from 1893 to 1894. It was officially designed by architecture firm Honeyman and Keppie; one of the contributing artists was Charles Rennie Mackintosh. It was his first building for the firm. In a letter to Hermann Muthesies, he expressed frustration with his hidden role in the design, writing that the official attribution to Honeyman and Keppie was "very unfortunate to me, but I hope that when brighter days come, I shall be able to work for myself entirely, and claim my work as mine." According to Professor Anthony Jones, the design's resemblance to Siena's campanile tower shows the influence of Mackintosh's previous trips to Italy. The design includes features from the Scottish baronial and Queen Anne styles, and the building's proportions and window arrangements are considered to be characteristic of Mackintosh's architectural work. Construction began in February 1894 and was completed by summer 1895.

The building was initially an extension to the Glasgow Herald's connected Buchanan Street premises. Mackintosh also contributed to the building's interior design: the editor's room has been identified as a space that showed his influence particularly strongly. The Glasgow Herald occupied the building until 1980, when it moved location to Albion Street.

== 1999 - 2010: Use as Scotland's Centre for Architecture and Design ==
For 20 years, the building stood empty. It underwent renovations and extensions by Page and Park Architects costing £13 million, and was reopened in July 1999 by Queen Elizabeth II. It was renamed The Lighthouse, Scotland's Centre for Architecture and Design. It was hoped that the Lighthouse would exist as a legacy to Glasgow's designation as UK City of Architecture and Design, a title it was awarded in the same year of the building's reopening. In 1999, the Clydesdale Bank issued a £20 note to mark Glasgow's celebrations as UK City of Architecture and Design which featured an illustration of the Lighthouse building and the dome of Thomson's Holmwood House on the reverse. The obverse side carried a portrait of Glaswegian architect Alexander "Greek" Thomson.

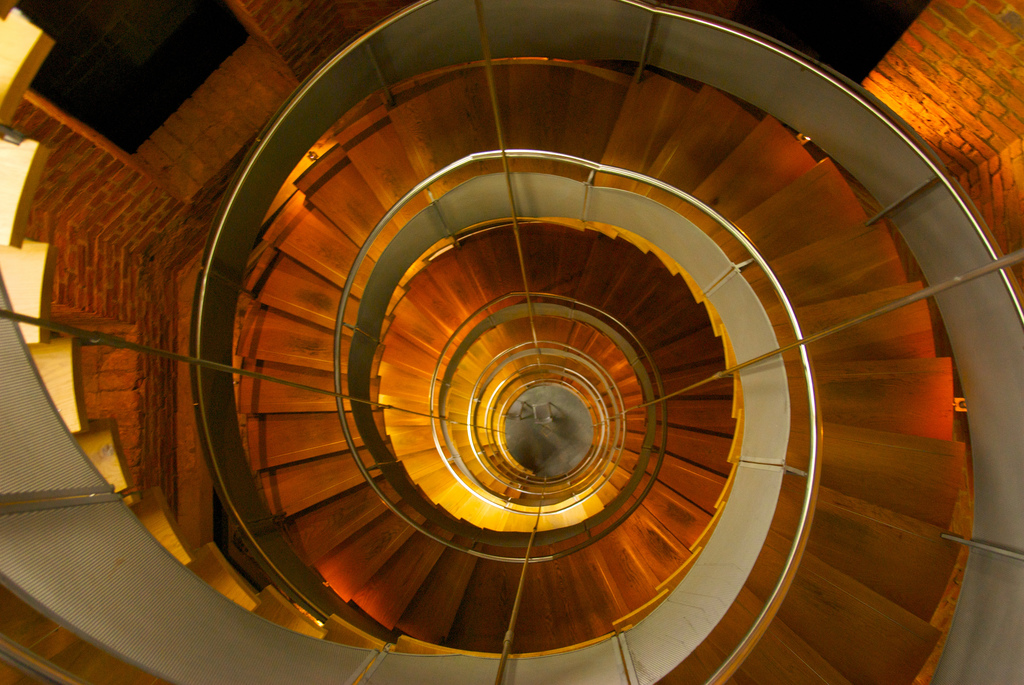
View of the helical staircase leading up to the viewing platform at the top of the Lighthouse

As The Lighthouse, the building was transformed into six floors that included display and exhibition space. It held the Mackintosh Centre, an exhibition of Mackintosh's work. Visitors could also learn about materials in the Sustainable Building materials library. A quarter of the floorspace within The Lighthouse was designed to engage with children, including an "Education Centre and a Wee People's City", which encouraged children to learn about Glasgow. Furthermore, a spiral staircase lead to an outdoor platform that boasted views of the city centre and a rooftop café-bar. At this time, the building was operated by The Lighthouse Trust.

In 2009, The Lighthouse entered administration. It came after a long financial struggle due to the recession and overspending on projects: in the previous year, The Lighthouse reported a £300,000 budget deficit. The Scottish Government refused to bail it out, and 57 jobs were lost though 10 members of staff transferred to work in the governmental agency Architecture and Design Scotland. In 2010, ownership of the Lighthouse was transferred to Glasgow City Council and operations resumed.

== 2020 - Present day: COVID-19 closure and Sustainable Ventures ==
At the onset of the COVID-19 pandemic in 2020, The Lighthouse closed; it has remained "temporarily" shut ever since. In January 2025, it was reported that Glasgow City Council was in talks to lease the building to Sustainable Ventures, who had plans to transform it into a hub for the environmental technology industry. In November 2025, councillors approved the plans, and a 99-year-long lease was granted to Sustainable Ventures.

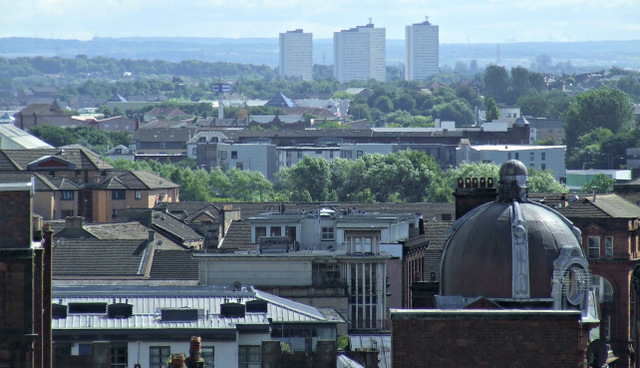
View from the Lighthouse

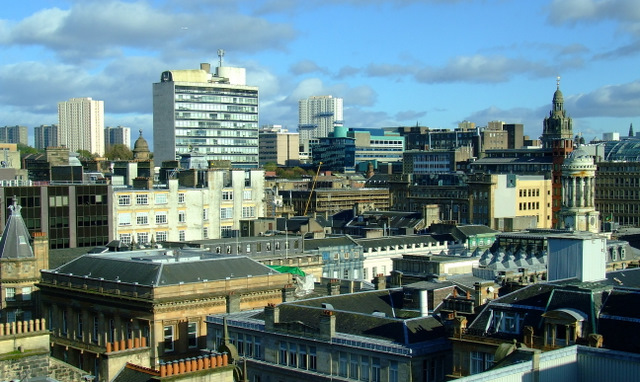
View from the Lighthouse

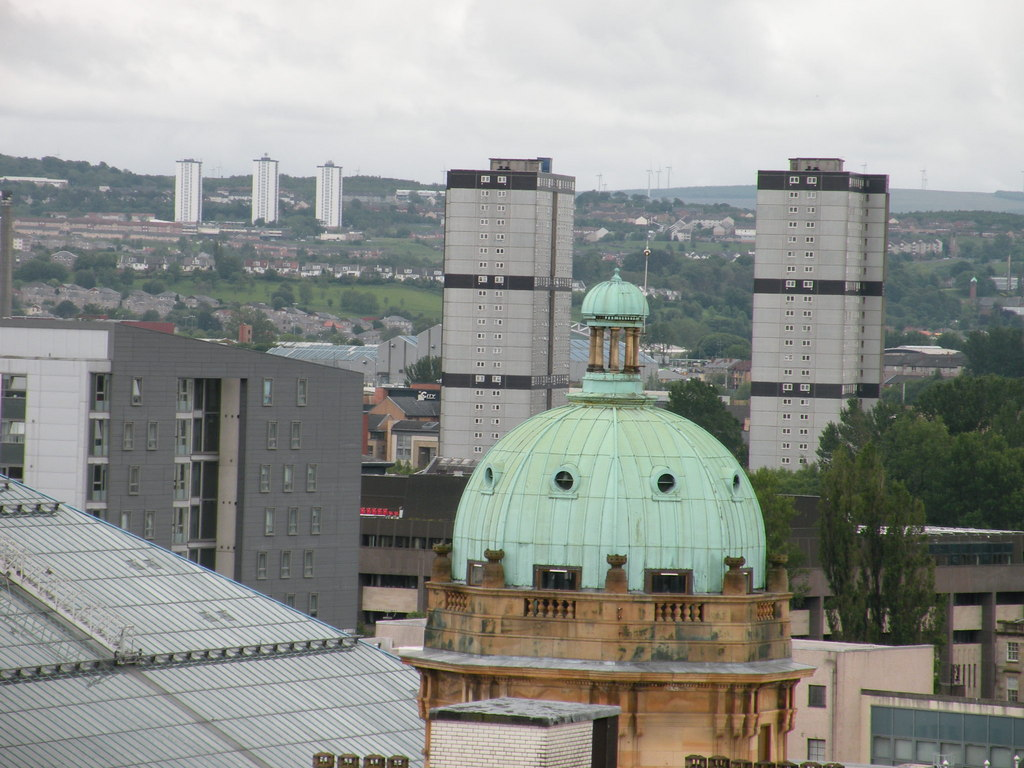
View from the Lighthouse

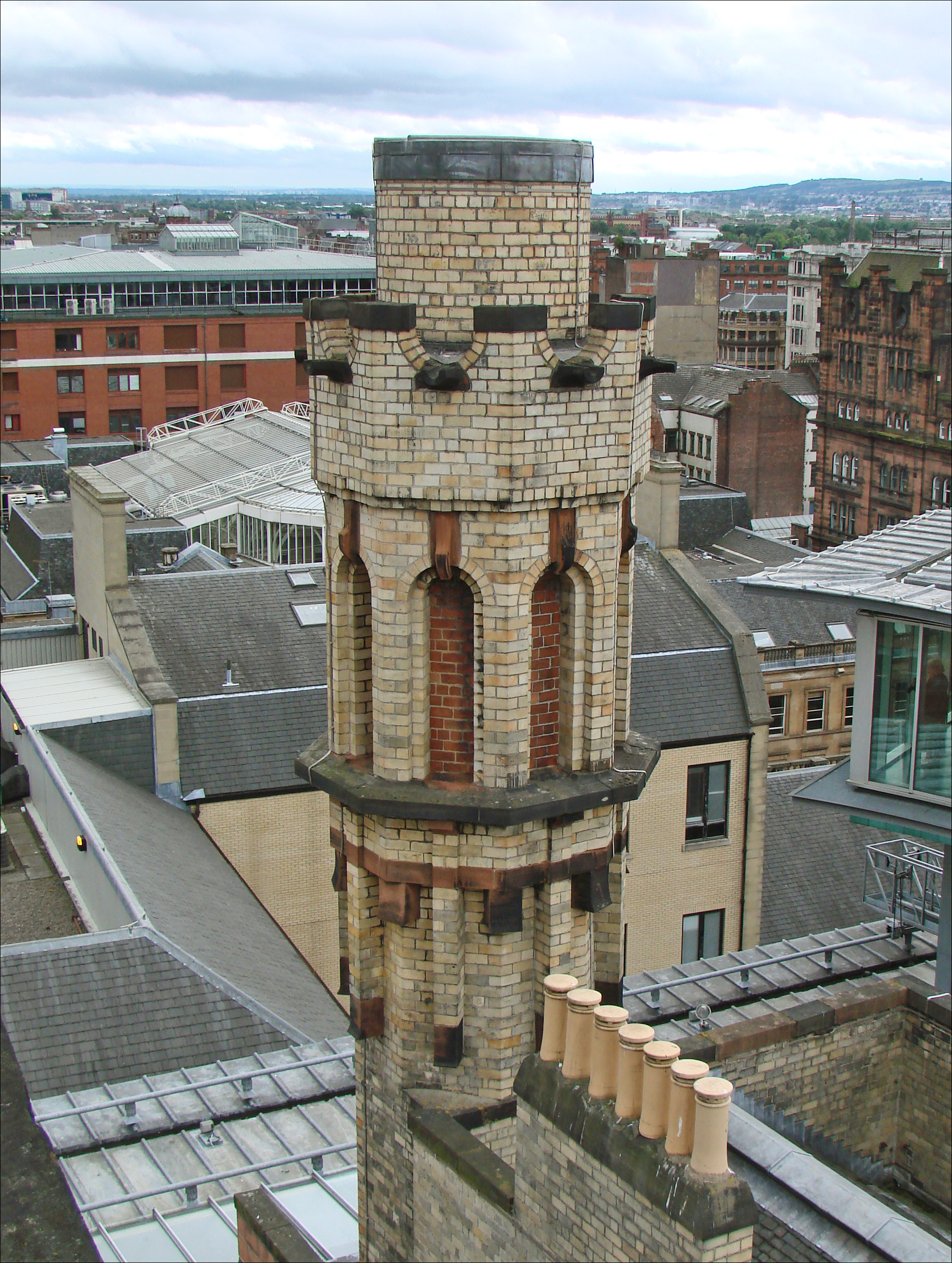
View from the Lighthouse

== See also ==
- Culture in Glasgow
