= Caledonia Road Church =

Former parish church in Glasgow City, Scotland, UK

Coordinates: 55°50′50″N 4°15′17″W

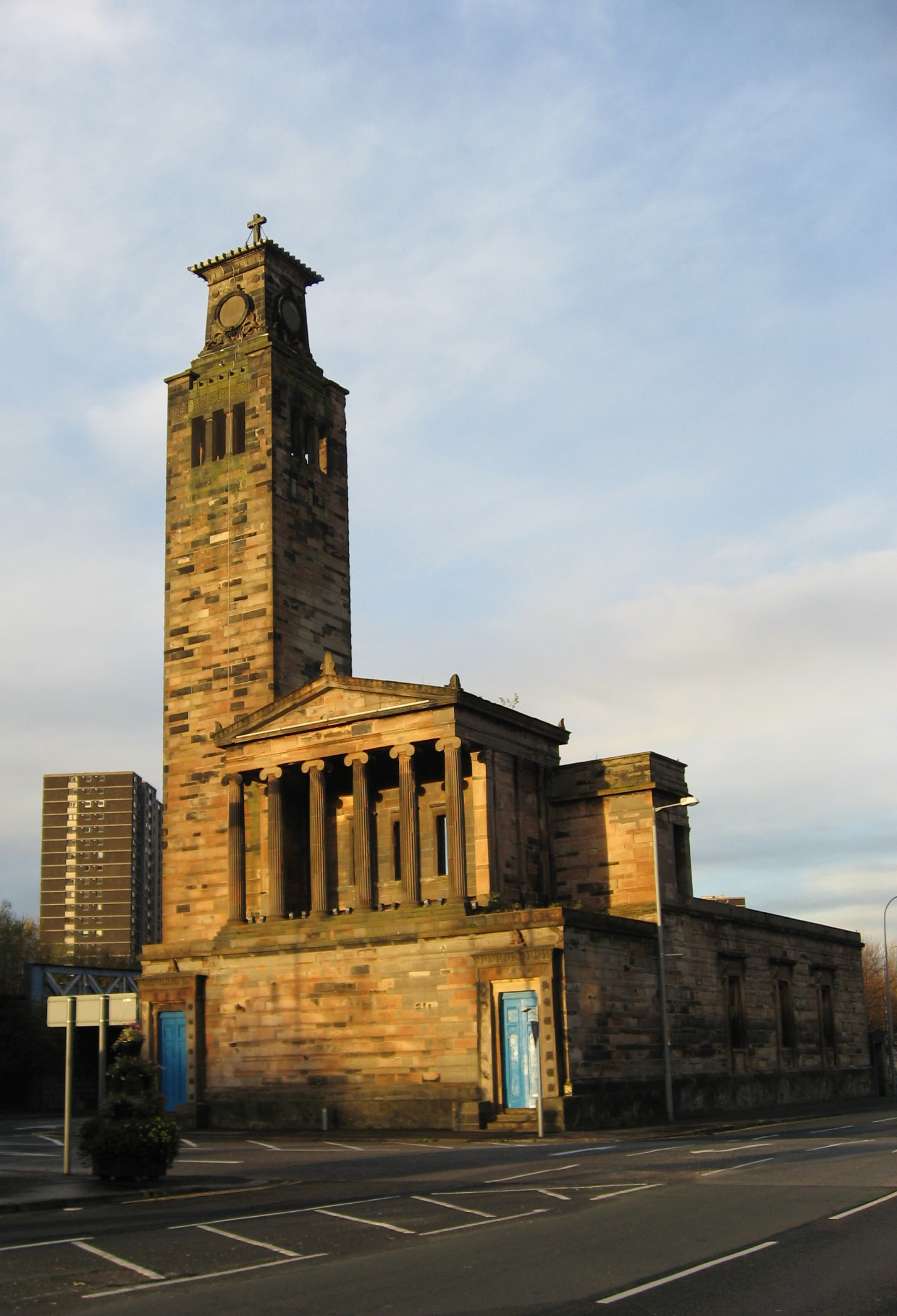
Caledonia Road Church in its current condition

Caledonia Road Church, formerly Caledonia Road United Presbyterian Church and Hutchesontown and Caledonia Road Church, is a ruined church in Glasgow, Scotland. In 1966 the building was added to the Scottish Heritage List as Category A.

== History ==
The Scottish architect John Baird was responsible for the design. At that time, he ran a joint architectural office with Alexander Thomson. After the partnership broke up in 1856, Thomson continued the construction which had begun the previous year. On 22 March 1857 the church was opened. The total cost was about £8000.

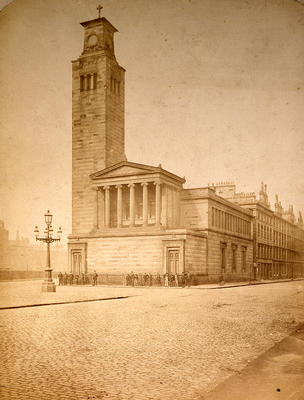
Caledonia Road Church as built.

In 1963 the church use of Caledonian Road Church ended and the city of Glasgow took over the building. In October 1965, the church burned down after arson and was subsequently partially demolished. Since the 1990s, there have been various plans for the restoration and further use of the building, but these have not been implemented, and only necessary work to stabilise the building was carried out. The risk to the ruin is classified as high.

== Description ==
The neoclassical Greek Revival building stands at the junction of Gorbals Road (A730) with Caledonian Road (A728) in the Gorbals. The V-shaped streets closely enclose the church on both sides. On the southeast-facing façade, a portico in the style of Greek temple architecture with six Ionic columns emerges at gallery level. He sits on the massive church hall. This is where the two entrance portals are embedded. They are richly ornamented with Greek motifs and antefixes. On the west side the building is nine, on the east side three axes wide. Only a short section of the gallery remains. The square tower on the west façade is designed on all sides near its end with open, narrow triplet windows. It is topped by a lantern surmounted by a cross.
