= Millbrae Crescent =

Coordinates: 55.8224°N 4.27575°W

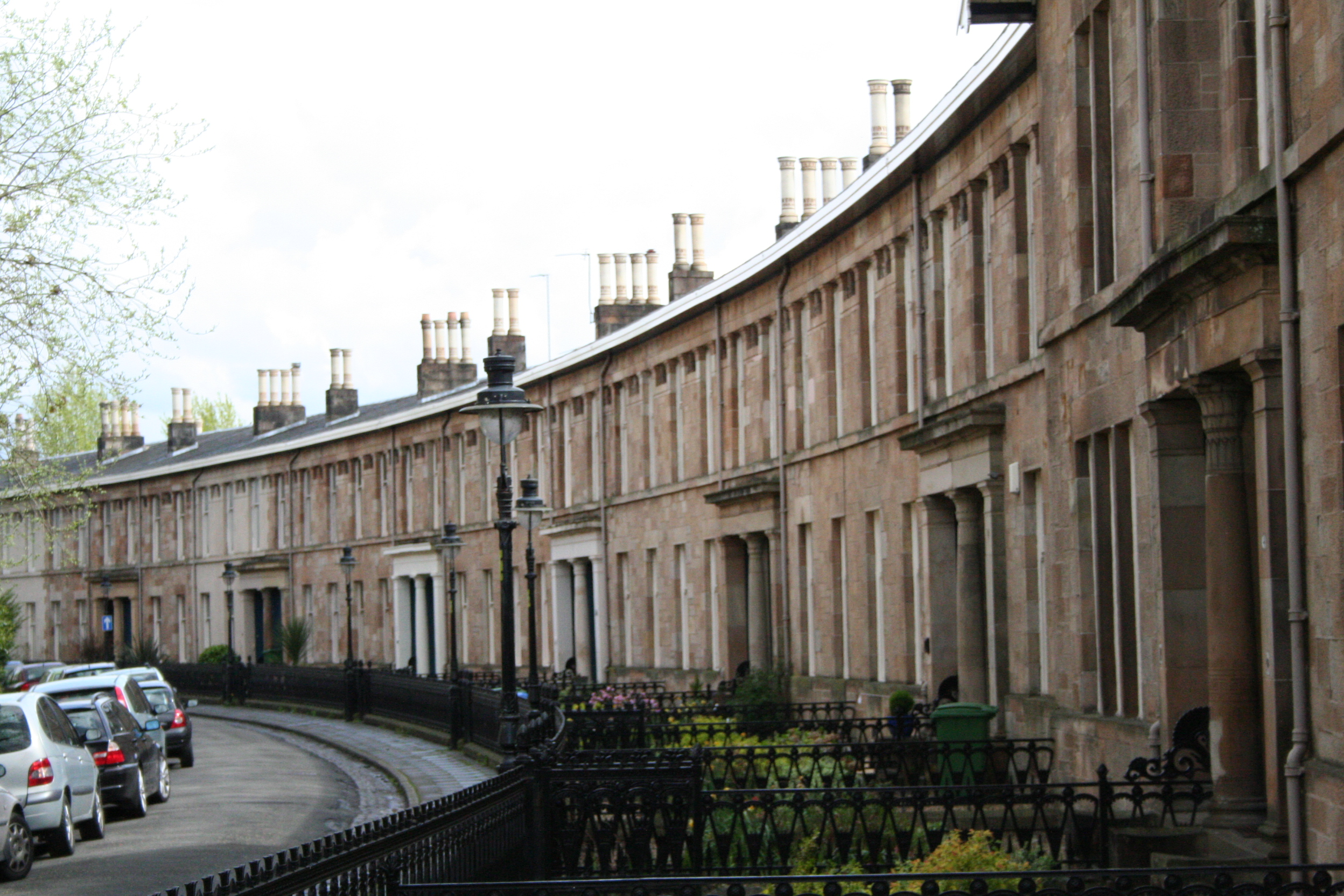
- Interactive map of the Millbrae Crescent area

General information
- Architectural style: Greek Revival
- Location: Glasgow, Scotland
- Construction started: 1876
- Completed: 1877

Technical details
- Structural system: Masonry

Design and construction
- Architect: Alexander Thomson

Millbrae Crescent is a street located in Glasgow providing numerous examples of category A listed buildings thought to be designed by Alexander "Greek" Thomson, or posthumously by his architectural partner, Robert Turnbull. The street comprises an elegant row of two-storey terraced houses built using blonde sandstone and exemplifying Thomson's typical use of Egyptian-derived columns and ornamentation. Millbrae Crescent is located on the River Cart in Langside, Glasgow, and within close proximity of Thomson's noted residential Victorian villa, Holmwood House. The crescent, which is located near the White Cart Water river, has been a high risk area for flooding over the years.
