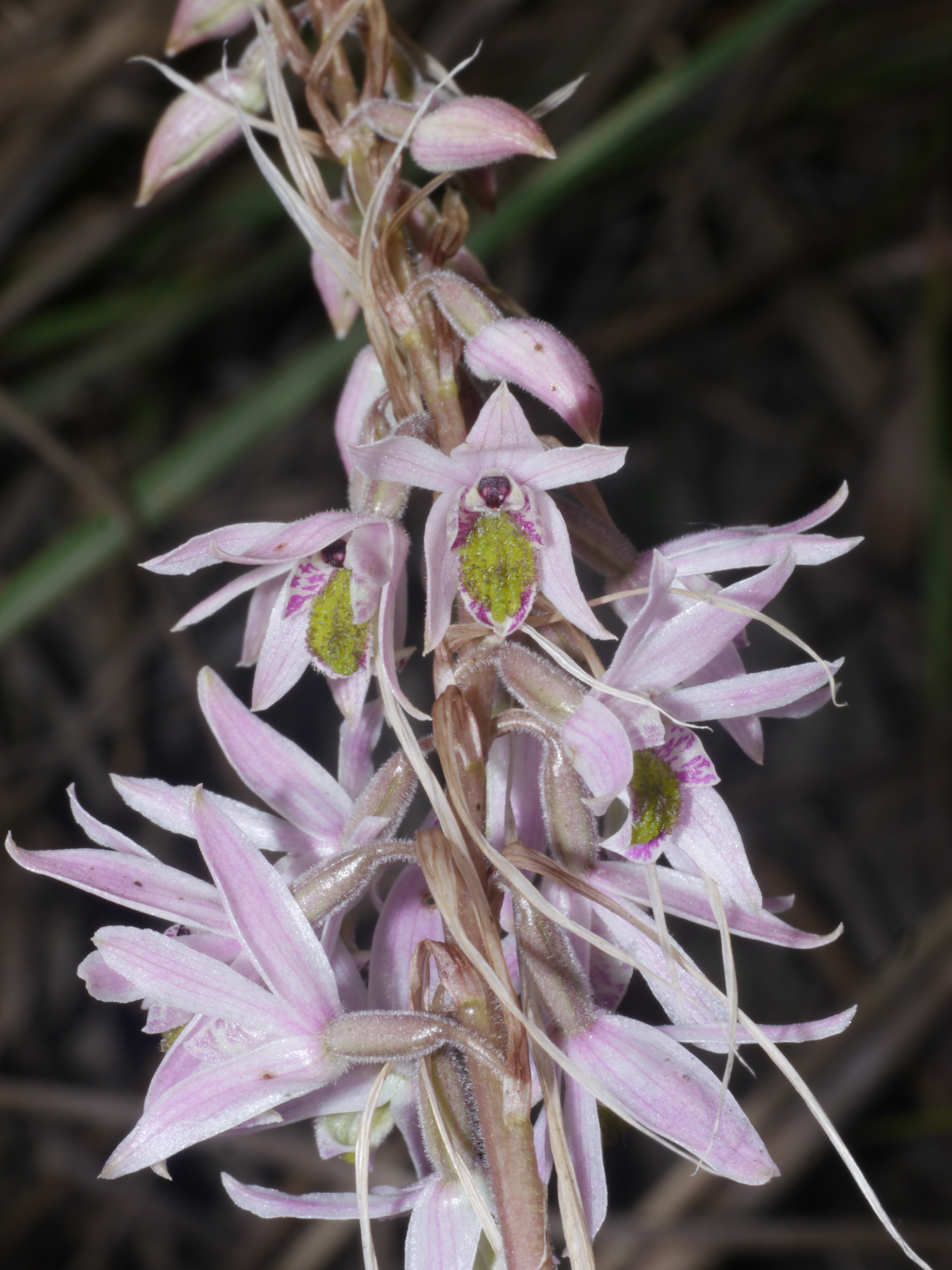
- Pachystoma pubescens in the Namdapha Tiger Reserve

Scientific classification
- Kingdom: Plantae
- Clade: Tracheophytes
- Clade: Angiosperms
- Clade: Monocots
- Order: Asparagales
- Family: Orchidaceae
- Subfamily: Epidendroideae
- Genus: Pachystoma
- Species: P. pubescens

Binomial name
- Pachystoma pubescens Blume

Synonyms
- List: Pachychilus pubescens (Blume) Blume; Apaturia chinensis Lindl.; Apaturia lindleyana Wight; Apaturia montana Lindl.; Apaturia senilis Lindl.; Apaturia smithiana Lindl.; Epipactis scariosa Buch.-Ham. ex Wall. nom. nud.; Eulophia hirsuta T.P.Linn nom. illeg.; Eulophia hirsuta J.Joseph & Vajr.; Eulophia holtzei F.Muell.; Graphorkis holtzei (F.Muell.) Kuntze; Neottia pantanis Korth. ex Blume; Pachychilus chinensis (Lindl.) Blume; Pachychilus montanus (Lindl.) Blume; Pachychilus pantanus Blume; Pachychilus senile (Lindl.) Blume; Pachychilus smithianus (Lindl.) Blume; Pachychilus speciosus Blume; Pachystoma affine Schltr.; Pachystoma brevilabium Schltr.; Pachystoma chinense (Lindl.) Rchb.f.; Pachystoma chinense var. formosanum (Schltr.) S.S.Ying; Pachystoma edgworthii Rchb.f.; Pachystoma formosanum Schltr.; Pachystoma fortunei Rchb.f.; Pachystoma gracile Schltr.; Pachystoma hirsuta (J.Joseph & Vajr.) C.S.Kumar & Manilal; Pachystoma holtzei (F.Muell.) F.Muell.; Pachystoma josephi Müll.Berol.; Pachystoma lindleyanum (Wight) Rchb.f.; Pachystoma ludaoense S.C.Chen & Y.B.Luo; Pachystoma montanum (Lindl.) Rchb.f.; Pachystoma nutans S.C.Chen & Y.B.Luo; Pachystoma pantanum (Blume) Miq.; Pachystoma papuanum Schltr.; Pachystoma parvifolium Rchb.f.; Pachystoma pubescens var. gracile (Schltr.) N.Hallé; Pachystoma senile (Lindl.) Rchb.f.; Pachystoma smithianum (Lindl.) Rchb.f.; Pachystoma speciosum (Blume) Rchb.f.; Pachystoma wightii Rchb.f.

= Pachystoma pubescens =

Pink kunai orchid

Species of plant

Pachychila pubescens, commonly known as pink kunai orchid or as 粉口兰 (fen kou lan), is a plant in the orchid family. It is native to areas from Asia through Southeast Asia to New Guinea and northern Australia. It is a deciduous, terrestrial herb with one or two grass-like leaves and up to ten dull pink, more or less drooping flowers. It grows in wet, grassy places in forests and woodlands.

== Description ==
Pachystoma pubescens is a deciduous, terrestrial herb with one or two dark green, linear, pleated, sharply pointed leaves 300–450 mm (12–18 in) long and 8–10 mm (0.3–0.4 in) wide. Between four and ten resupinate, dull pink, more or less tubular, drooping flowers 10–12 mm (0.4–0.5 in) long and 4–5 mm (0.16–0.20 in)wide are borne on a flowering stem 300–600 mm (10–20 in) tall. The dorsal sepal is 10–12 mm (0.4–0.5 in) long, about 4 mm (0.2 in) wide and the lateral sepals are a similar length but 5–6 mm (0.20–0.24 in) wide with a humped base. The petals are a similar length to the sepals but narrower. The labellum is 10–12 mm (0.4–0.5 in) long and 6–8 mm (0.2–0.3 in) wide with three lobes. The middle lobe has a square tip and pimply surface and the side lobes curve upwards. Flowering occurs in November and December in Australia and March to September in Asia.

== Taxonomy and naming ==
Pachystoma pubescens was first described in 1825 by Carl Ludwig Blume, in his Bijdragen tot de Flora van Nederlandsch Indie. The specific epithet (pubescens) is derived from the Latin word pubesco meaning "put on the down of puberty" with the ending -escens meaning "beginning of" or "becoming", hence "pubescent".

== Distribution and habitat ==
The pink kunal orchid often grows with grasses such as kunai grass (Imperata cylindrica) in woodland and forest areas that are seasonally wet. It occurs in China, Bangladesh, Bhutan, Cambodia, India, Indonesia, Laos, Malaysia, Myanmar, New Guinea, the Philippines, Vietnam and in Australia where it is found in northern parts of the Northern Territory and in Tropical North Queensland.
