= Pachystoma nutans =

Scientific classification
- Kingdom: Plantae
- Clade: Tracheophytes
- Clade: Angiosperms
- Clade: Monocots
- Order: Asparagales
- Family: Orchidaceae
- Subfamily: Epidendroideae
- Genus: Pachystoma
- Species: P. nutans

Binomial name
- Pachystoma nutans S.C.Chen & Y.B.Luo

Species of plant

Pachystoma nutans, is a species of plant in the orchid family. It is endemic to Myanmar. It was first described by Sing Chi Chen and Yi Bo Luo in 2002. The type specimen of Pachystoma nutans was previously overlooked among unidentified Eulophia species at the Royal Botanic Garden herbarium in Edinburgh. It is only known from the type specimen, which was collected near Mong Yaw, Myanmar.

== Description ==
The only specimen of P. nutans was described as follows: 21 cm (8.3 in) tall with an erect, glabrous stem. It has 5 membranous, nerved sheaths, also glabrous. No leaves were included with the specimen, probably due to the general absence of leaves during flowering, similar to other Pachystoma and Eulophia species. The raceme is 3.7 cm (1.5 in) long with 2 nodding flowers. The pedicel (botany) and ovary are 1.3–1.5 cm (0.51–0.59 in) long and white-pubescent. The flowers are pale cream, faintly flushed with pink, with a bright yellowish-green lip. The dorsal sepal is puberulous on both surfaces, elliptic-oblong, 1.2 cm (0.47 in) long and 2.7 mm (0.11 in) across, with 5 nerves. The lateral sepals are similar to the dorsal, but oblique. The petals are linear, acuminate at the apex, puberulous, 1.2 cm (0.47 in) long, and 1.2 mm (0.047 in) across, with 3 nerves. The lip is orbicular-ovate in outline, constricted slightly below the middle, forming three large lobes.

Pachystoma nutans is distinguished from Pachystoma pubescens by its two-flowered inflorescence (versus many-flowered); glabrous rachis (versus more or less pilose), flowers nodding (rather than horizontally spreading), and its lip trilobed slightly below the middle (rather than above the middle).
