= Holmwood House =

Historic house in Glasgow

Coordinates: 55.8097°N 4.25936°W

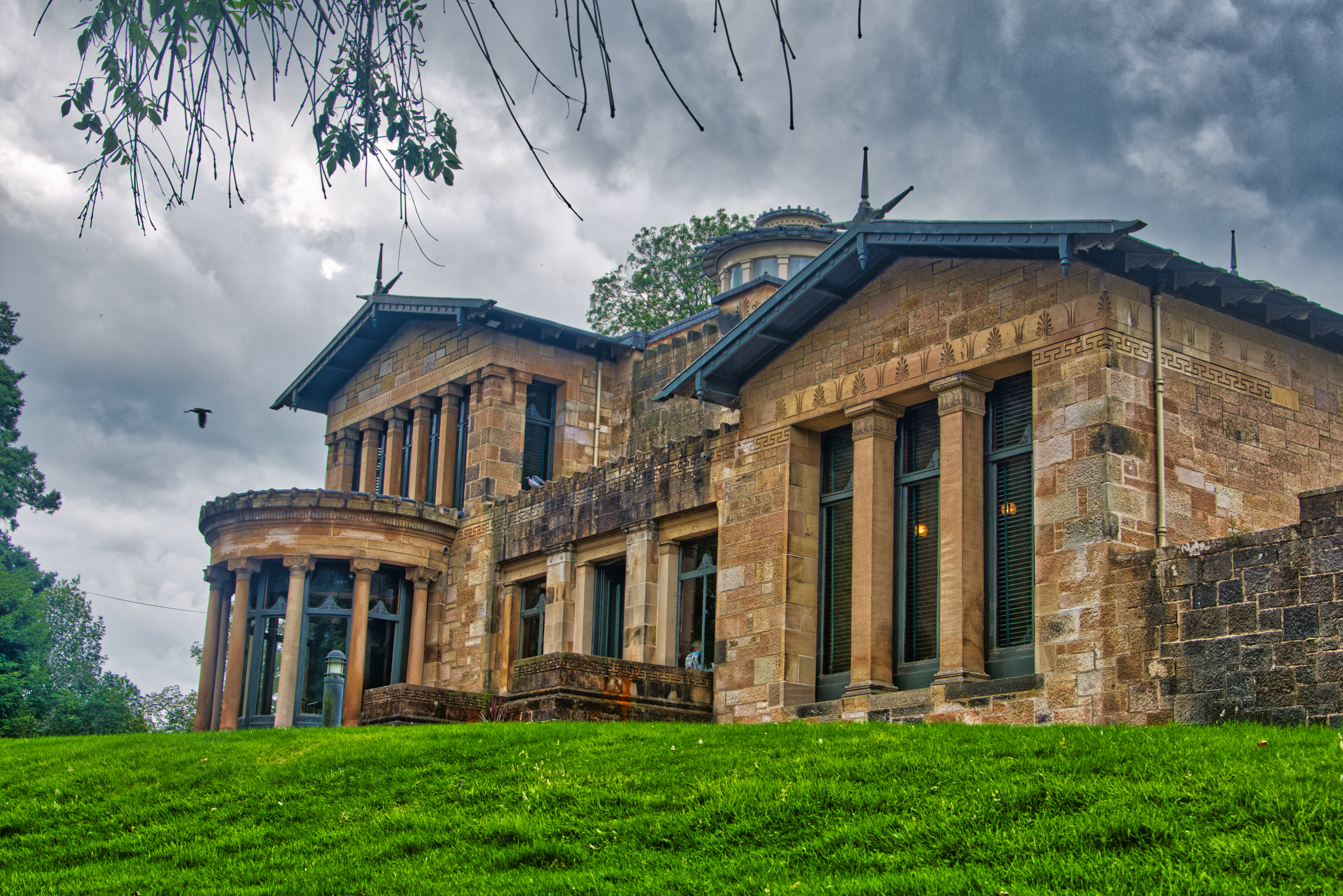
- Holmwood House
- Interactive map of the Holmwood House area

General information
- Architectural style: Greek Revival
- Location: Glasgow, Scotland
- Construction started: 1857
- Completed: 1858
- Cost: £3,682
- Client: James Couper

Technical details
- Structural system: masonry

Design and construction
- Architect: Alexander Thomson

Listed Building – Category A
- Official name: 61, 63 Netherlee Road, "Holmwood"
- Designated: 17 June 1967
- Reference no.: LB33944

Holmwood House is the finest and most elaborate residential villa designed by the Scottish architect Alexander "Greek" Thomson. It is also rare in retaining much of its original interior decor, and being open to the public. A Category A listed building, the villa is located at 61–63 Netherlee Road, Cathcart, in the southern suburbs of Glasgow, and is owned by the National Trust for Scotland.

Holmwood is considered to be immensely influential by several architectural historians, because the design as published in Villa and Cottage Architecture: select examples of country and suburban residence recently erected in 1868 may have influenced Frank Lloyd Wright and other proto-modernist architects.

== History ==
Holmwood was constructed for James Couper, a paper manufacturer in 1857–1858. Couper and his brother Robert owned the Millholm paper mill in the valley of the White Water of Cart immediately below the villa. The principal rooms of Holmwood were orientated towards the view of Cathcart Castle (demolished in 1980). The cost of the house was £2,608:4:11d; the coach house, greenhouse & outbuildings cost a further £1,009:19:6d; and the gates an additional £75:2:0d

The polychromatic decoration was designed by Thomson and executed by Campbell Tait Bowie. The most notable survival is in the dining room which has a frieze of panels enlarged from John Flaxman's illustrations of Homer's Iliad. The sculpture on the hall chimneypiece was by George Mossman.

Holmwood was altered in the 1920s by the owner, James Gray. After World War II it was purchased by a local vet, James McElhone and his family, wife Betty and children: Rosemary, James, Helen and Paul.

In 1931, Thomas Redden Patterson purchased the house and settled there with his wife, Margaret Malcolm Dumbreck Forrester. Together, they established Forresters (Outfitters) Ltd a prominent Glasgow-based firm—founded in 1955 to continue the legacy of Margaret's earlier business, Margaret Forrester, Drapers, which had operated on London Road. The company remained a respected name in local retail until its acquisition by House of Fraser in 1984.

Beyond their entrepreneurial ventures, the Pattersons also owned a yacht moored in Greenock, which notably took part in the Dunkirk evacuation. Thomas Patterson was awarded the CBE for contributions to public life in Glasgow in the 1954 Birthday Honours.

Holmwood was eventually sold to the Sisters of Our Lady of the Missions who obliterated much of the original decoration with plain paint. The gardener's cottage was demolished in the 1970s; the grounds and those of an adjacent villa were used for a Catholic primary school.

The nuns put the property on the market in the early 1990s, and there was a danger that the grounds would be developed for housing, destroying the setting of the villa. Following an appeal, Holmwood was acquired by the National Trust for Scotland in 1994 with the support of £1.5million from the National Heritage Memorial Fund. It was restored by Page\Park Architects in 1997–1998. Their work included undoing the 1920s alterations and rebuilding the connecting screen wall to the coach house. Patrick Baty carried out the paint analysis.

== City of Architecture and Design ==
In 1999, the Clydesdale Bank issued a £20 note to mark Glasgow's celebrations as UK City of Architecture and Design which featured an illustration of the dome of Holmwood House, along with the Lighthouse building on the reverse. The obverse side carried a portrait of Thomson.

== Holmwood, South Australia ==
A second 'Holmwood' was constructed in 1885 for the wealthy mining magnate, benefactor and politician, William Austin Horn, at North Walkerville, Adelaide. The house was built posthumously from Thomson designs published in Villa and Cottage Architecture: select examples of country and suburban residence recently erected by Blackie & Son Publishing in 1868. This published work also included other Thomson designs, including his Romanesque Craig Ailey Villa at Cove on the Firth of Clyde. Although Holmwood was based on Thomson's designs and closely resembles Holmwood House, modifications were made to the internal design making the room layouts significantly different.

== See also ==
- List of Category A listed buildings in Glasgow
- Millbrae Crescent
