= George Mossman =

English physician and medical writer

- Occupations: Physician and medical writer

George Mossman (fl. 1800) was an English physician and medical writer.

== Biography ==
Mossman practised as a physician at Bradford, Yorkshire. On 6 July 1792 he married there a Miss Ramsbotham (Gent. Mag. 1792, pt. ii. p. 672). A marriage of Dr. Mossman, physician of Bradford, to Mrs. Ramsbottom of Barwick-in-Elmet, Yorkshire, is also recorded in 1812 (ib. 1812, pt. ii. p. 586).

Mossman wrote:

- 'Observations on the Brunonian Practice of Physic: including a Reply to an anonymous Publication reprobating the Use of Stimulants in Fevers,' 8vo, London, 1788.
- 'An Essay to elucidate the Nature, Origin, and Connexion of Srophula [sic] and glandular Consumption; including a brief History of the Effects of Ilkley Spaw; with Observation on the Medicinal Powers of the Digitalis,' &c., 8vo, Bradford [1792?] (another edit., London, 1800).

He contributed four papers to Duncan's 'Annals of Medicine,' 1797 and 1799 (ii. 298, 307, 413, iv. 432), a paper in the 'Medical Repository' (i. 577), and numerous papers on the effects of digitalis in consumption to the 'Medical and Physical Journal.'
