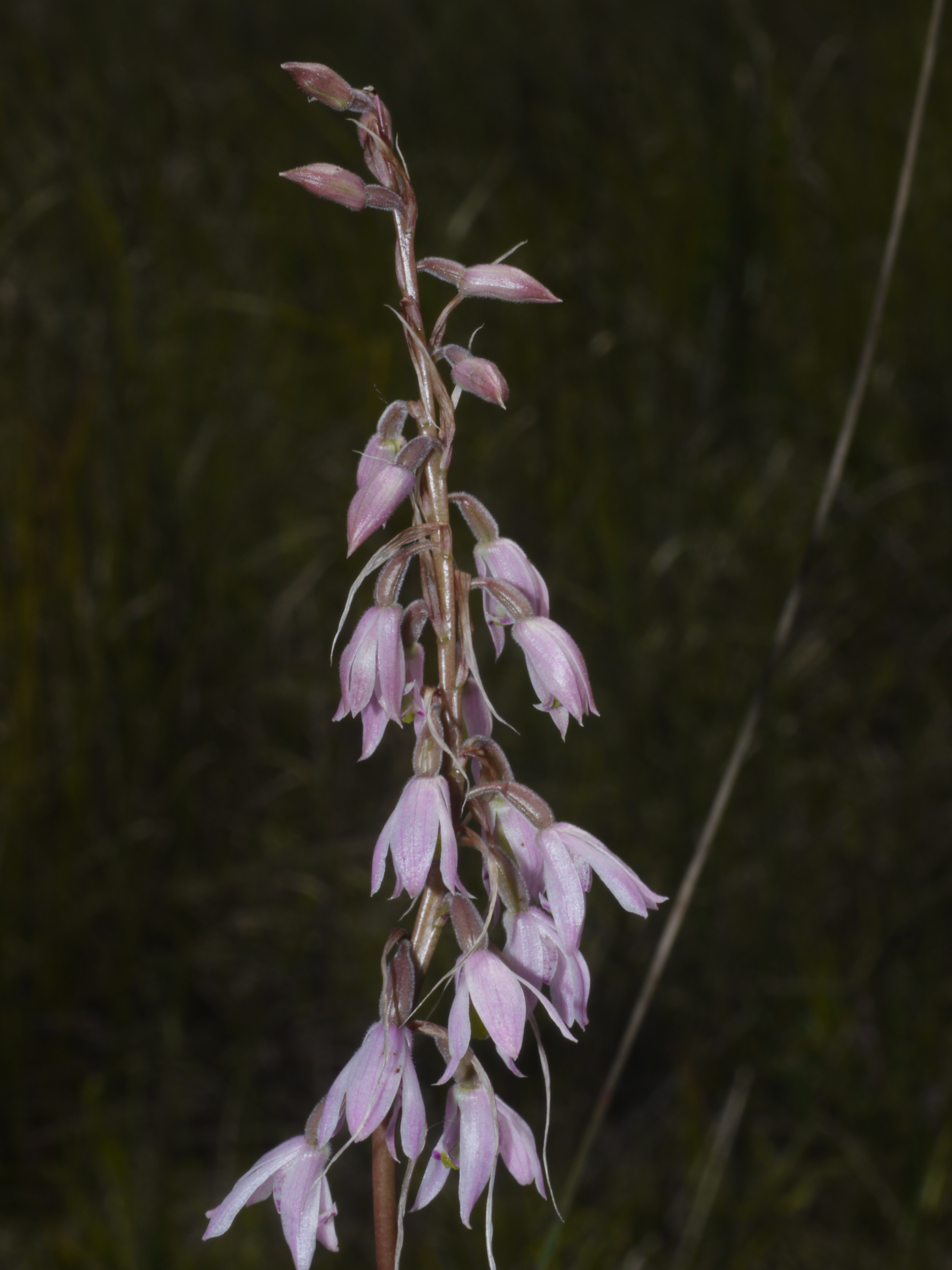
- Pachystoma pubescens in the Namdapha Tiger Reserve

Scientific classification
- Kingdom: Plantae
- Clade: Tracheophytes
- Clade: Angiosperms
- Clade: Monocots
- Order: Asparagales
- Family: Orchidaceae
- Subfamily: Epidendroideae
- Tribe: Collabieae
- Genus: Pachystoma; Blume

Synonyms
- Pachychilus Blume; Apaturia Lindl.

= Pachystoma =

Kunai orchids

Genus of orchids

Pachystoma, commonly known as kunai orchids or 粉口兰属 (fen kou lan shu), is a genus of two species of flowering plants in the orchid family, Orchidaceae. They are deciduous, terrestrial herbs with one or two linear, pleated or veiny leaves and more or less drooping flowers which do not open widely, on a thin, wiry flowering stem. Species in this genus are found in tropical and subtropical Asia to Australia and islands of the southwest Pacific Ocean.

== Description ==
Orchids in the genus Pachystoma are deciduous, terrestrial herbs with a branching underground rhizome and one or two linear, papery, pleated or veiny leaves. A thin, wiry flowering stem bears smallish, pink drooping flowers that are hairy on the outside. The sepals and petals are similar in size and shape, the lateral sepals having a hump at their base. The labellum has three lobes, the middle lobe projecting forwards and the side lobes unusually large.

== Taxonomy and naming ==
The genus Pachystoma was first formally described in 1825 by Carl Ludwig Blume and the description was published in Bijdragen tot de Flora van Nederlandsch Indie. The name Pachystoma is derived from the Ancient Greek words pachys meaning "thick" and stoma meaning "mouth", apparently referring to a thickened callus on the labellum.

=== Species ===
As of November 2022, Plants of the World Online lists the following two species of Pachystoma:

- Pachystoma nutans S.C.Chen & Y.B.Luo - Myanmar
- Pachystoma pubescens Blume - between tropical and subtropical Asia to the southwest Pacific

In 1879, Heinrich Gustav Reichenbach described Pachystoma thomsonianum in The Gardeners' Chronicle, now known as Ancistrochilus thomsonianus (Rchb.f.) Rolfe. The specific epithet (thomsonianus) honours the Victorian botanist George Thomson.
