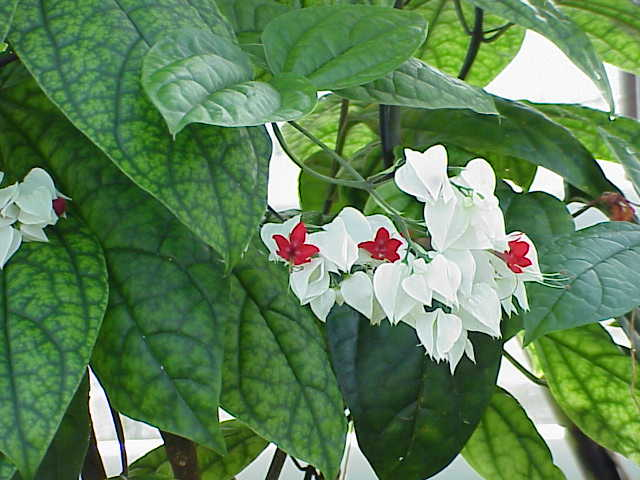

Scientific classification
- Kingdom: Plantae
- Clade: Tracheophytes
- Clade: Angiosperms
- Clade: Eudicots
- Clade: Asterids
- Order: Lamiales
- Family: Lamiaceae
- Genus: Clerodendrum
- Species: C. thomsoniae

Binomial name
- Clerodendrum thomsoniae Balf.f.

Synonyms
- Clerodendrum balfourii (B.D.Jacks. ex Dombrain) Dombrain; Clerodendrum thomsoniae var. balfourii B.D.Jacks. ex Dombrain

= Clerodendrum thomsoniae =

Species of plant

Clerodendrum thomsoniae is a species of flowering plant in the genus Clerodendrum of the family Lamiaceae, native to tropical west Africa from Cameroon west to Senegal. It is an evergreen liana growing to 4 m (13 ft) tall, with ovate to oblong leaves 8–17 cm (3–7 in) cm long. The flowers are produced in cymes of 8–20 together, each flower with a pure white to pale purple five-lobed calyx 2.5 cm in diameter, and a red five-lobed corolla 2 cm long and in diameter. The flowers are born in cymose inflorescences arising from the axils of the leaves. The leaves, in turn, are arranged opposite to each other and at right angles to the pairs above and below.

An unambiguous common name is bleeding glory-bower; terms like "glory-bower", "bagflower" or "bleeding-heart vine" are also often encountered but can refer to any of the roughly 400 species of Clerodendrum. In some regions it has escaped from cultivation and become naturalised.

It is grown as an ornamental plant for its decorative two-coloured flowers. With a minimum temperature of 10–13 °C (50–55 °F), in temperate areas it requires shelter and a frost-free environment. This plant has gained the Royal Horticultural Society's Award of Garden Merit (confirmed 2017).

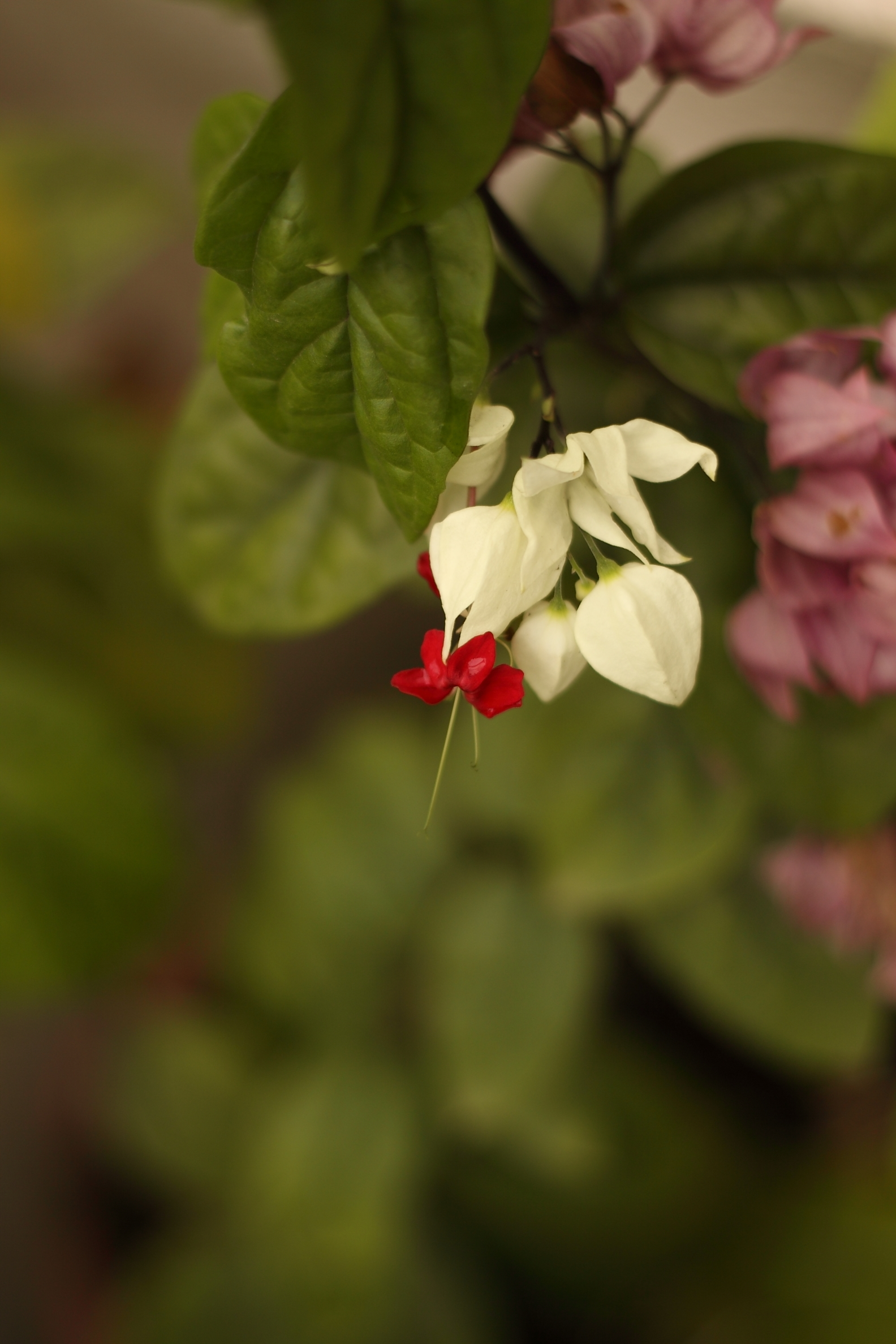
Bleeding heart.

The plant was named at the request of Rev. William Cooper Thomson (1829-22 March 1878), a missionary and physician in Nigeria, in honor of his late first wife. This plant was very popular during the mid 19th century under the name "beauty bush". It lost favour only when its unusual culture conditions were forgotten. Specifically, its root system must be partially submerged in water most of the time, and it wants very good light.

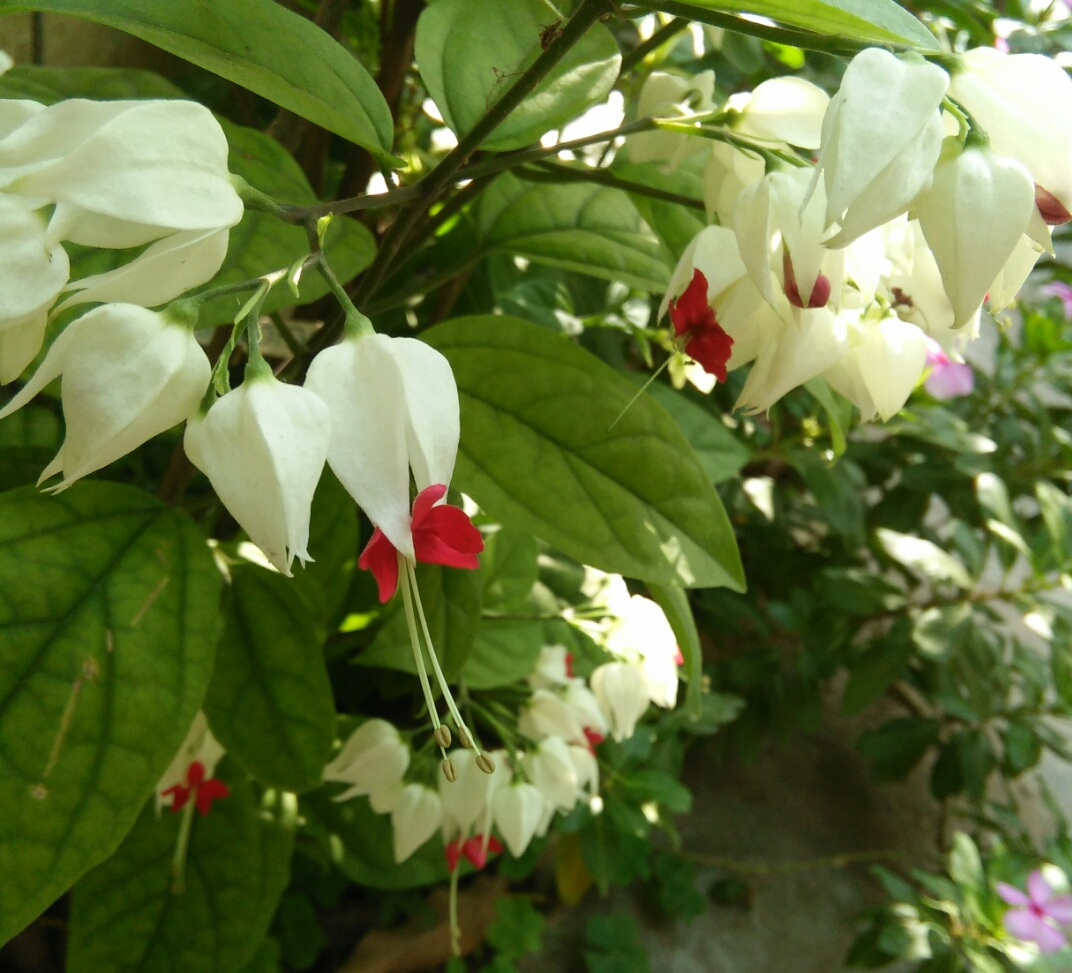
Closeup of flowers in India

== Etymology ==
Clerodendrum is derived from Greek and means 'chance tree'.
