= St Vincent Street Church, Glasgow =

St. Vincent Street Church
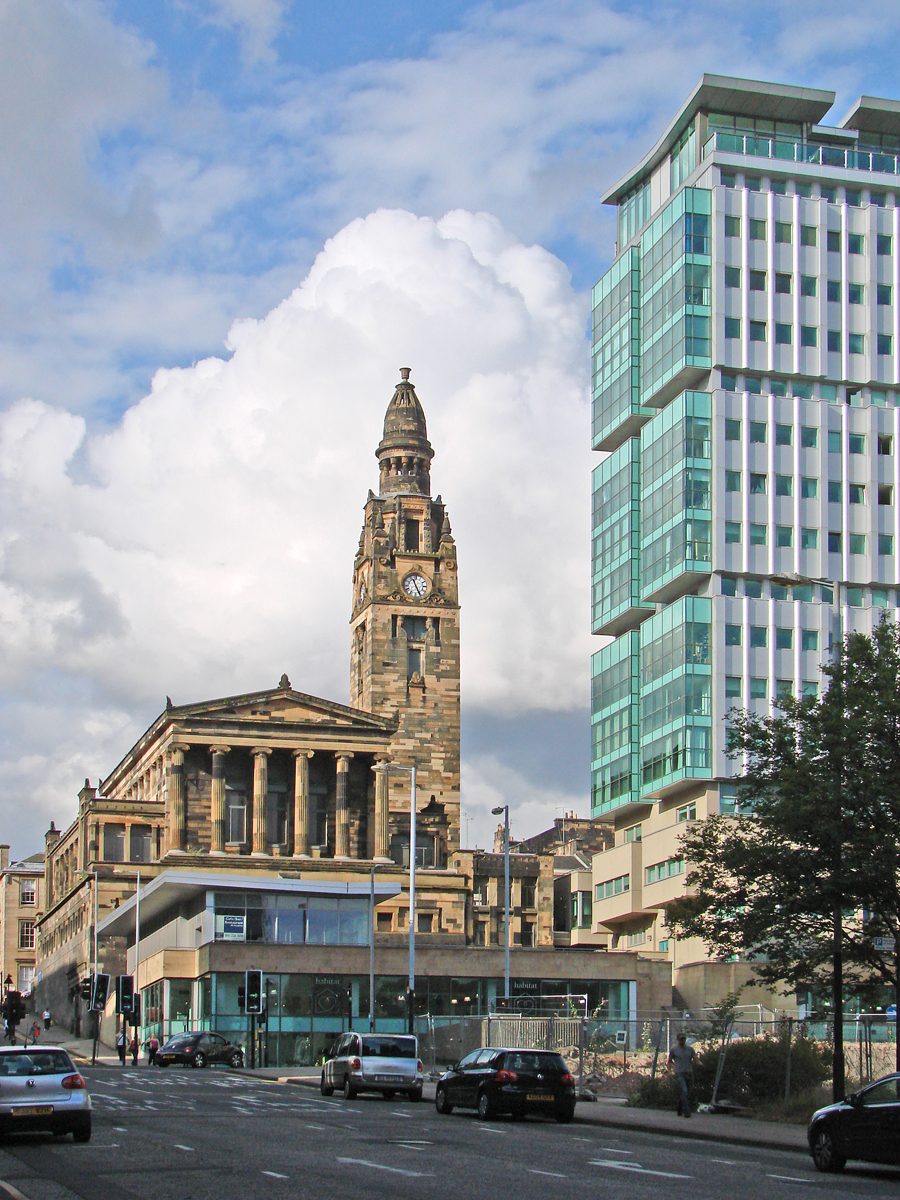
- St. Vincent Street Church

- Location within Scotland
- 55°51′44.6″N 4°15′55.5″W
- Location: Glasgow
- Country: Scotland
- Denomination: Free Church of Scotland

History
- Founded: 1857

Architecture
- Architect: Alexander Thomson
- Style: Greek revival
- Completed: 1859

St. Vincent Street Church is a Presbyterian church on St. Vincent Street in Glasgow, Scotland. It was designed by Alexander Thomson (also known as "Greek" Thomson) and built from 1857 to 1859 for the former United Presbyterian Church of Scotland. Elements (probably the tower) are by Thomson's young assistant, the church architect Robert Gordon Wilson, who was a member of the UP church. It is a Category A listed building. and is owned by Glasgow City Council.

Suffixed variously as United Presbyterian Church (1859), United Free Church (1900) and Parish Church of Scotland (1929) due to unions involving the denominations using it, the building was purchased by the Association of Spiritualists in 1939 then by Glasgow Corporation in 1964 who carried out repairs. From 1971 it was known as Glasgow City Free Church and used by a congregation of the Free Church of Scotland, originally serving the Gaelic community using premises further east in the city at Gordon Street (from 1824 to 1886) then Waterloo Street (from 1886 until being made homeless by a fire in 1957, prior to occupying St Vincent Street). In 1994 a union took place with the congregation of Milton Free Church (Garnethill) whose building was demolished due to safety concerns.

In 1998 the building was listed in the 1998 World Monuments Watch by the World Monuments Fund, and again in 2004 and 2006. The Fund helped restore the tower, with support from American Express.

In October 2021, Glasgow City Free Church were forced to vacate the building due to falling plaster. It has since lain unused. The congregation relocated to smaller premises further west in Partick, uniting in 2023 with the 'host' congregation – which itself traced its origins to 1843 – to be known as Crow Road Free Church.

In September 2024, the church was briefly open to the public as part of Glasgow's Doors Open Days.

In March 2026, the Alexander Thomson Society opened a public consultation about the future of the church. The group's plan is to reopen it as a mixed spiritual and secular space.

== See also ==
- List of Category A listed buildings in Glasgow
