= Dennistoun =

Area of Glasgow, Scotland

Coordinates: 55.8609°N 4.2161°W

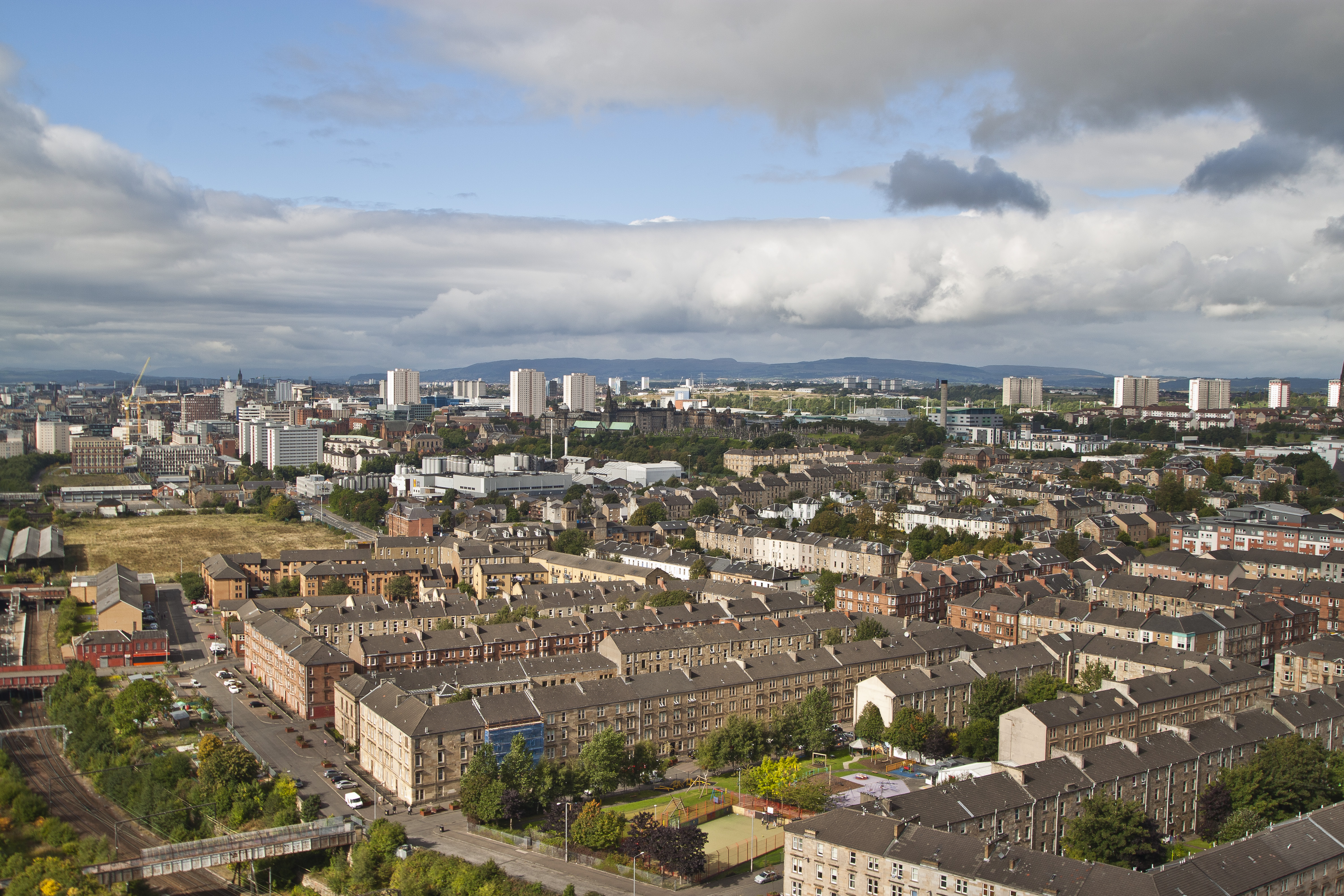
- Dennistoun looking west. The Glasgow Necropolis and Glasgow Cathedral are visible in the centre of the image, marking the boundary with Townhead.

- Location within Glasgow
- OS grid reference: NS614653
- Council area: Glasgow City Council
- Lieutenancy area: Glasgow
- Country: Scotland
- Sovereign state: United Kingdom
- Post town: GLASGOW
- Postcode district: G31
- Dialling code: 0141
- Police: Scotland
- Fire: Scottish
- Ambulance: Scottish
- UK Parliament: Glasgow North East
- Scottish Parliament: Glasgow Easterhouse and Springburn

Dennistoun (/ˈdɛnɪstən/) is a mostly residential district in Glasgow, Scotland, located north of the River Clyde and in the city's east end, about 1 1/4 miles (2 kilometres) east of the city centre. Since 2017 it has formed the core of a Dennistoun ward under Glasgow City Council, having previously been a component of the East Centre ward.

Aside from the smaller Haghill neighbourhood further east, Dennistoun's built environment does not adjoin any others directly, with the M8 motorway dividing it from Royston to the north, while the buildings of Glasgow Royal Infirmary and Wellpark Brewery plus the Glasgow Necropolis cemetery lie to the west (separating it from adjacent Townhead), and railway lines form the southern boundary with the Calton/Gallowgate neighbourhoods, and Camlachie (a historic district which is now largely a retail park) on the opposite side.

== History ==
Dennistoun was established by Alexander Dennistoun, Scottish merchant, bank director and, for a short time, an MP. Over a period, Alexander Dennistoun purchased a number of small estates neighbouring his Golf Hill property, including Craig Park, Whitehill, Meadow Park, Broom Park, Annfield, Bellfield, and Wester Craigs.

In 1836 the "Reformatory Institution and House of Refuge (For Boys)", funded by public subscription, was built on the westmost part of the Whitehill estate, with its entrance gatehouse and driveway off Duke Street. It normally accommodated around 300 "juvenile offenders and neglected children" for education and training. The area including the estates was incorporated into the city officially in 1846. In the 1850s, Annfield Place was built parallel to Duke Street, to the west of the Reformatory entrance.

In 1854 Dennistoun engaged the Glasgow architect James Salmon, who designed proposed development, surveyed the site, and laid it out in streets, terraces, and drives. The development area, to the north of Annfield Place, gained access off Duke Street via Westcraigs Street and Craigbank Street. The first plots in Dennistoun were feued from 1861. After Glasgow Corporation acquired the Kennyhill estate and laid it out as Alexandra Park with Alexandra Parade as its western approach, the Dennistoun suburb grew rapidly.

The Whitehill estate was developed and, just east of the Reformatory, Dennistoun Academy private school was built. Glasgow School Board took it over in 1883, and made it Whitehill public school for girls. This was demolished, and replaced in 1891 by the larger Whitehill Public School for boys, girls and infants, which later became Whitehill Secondary School.

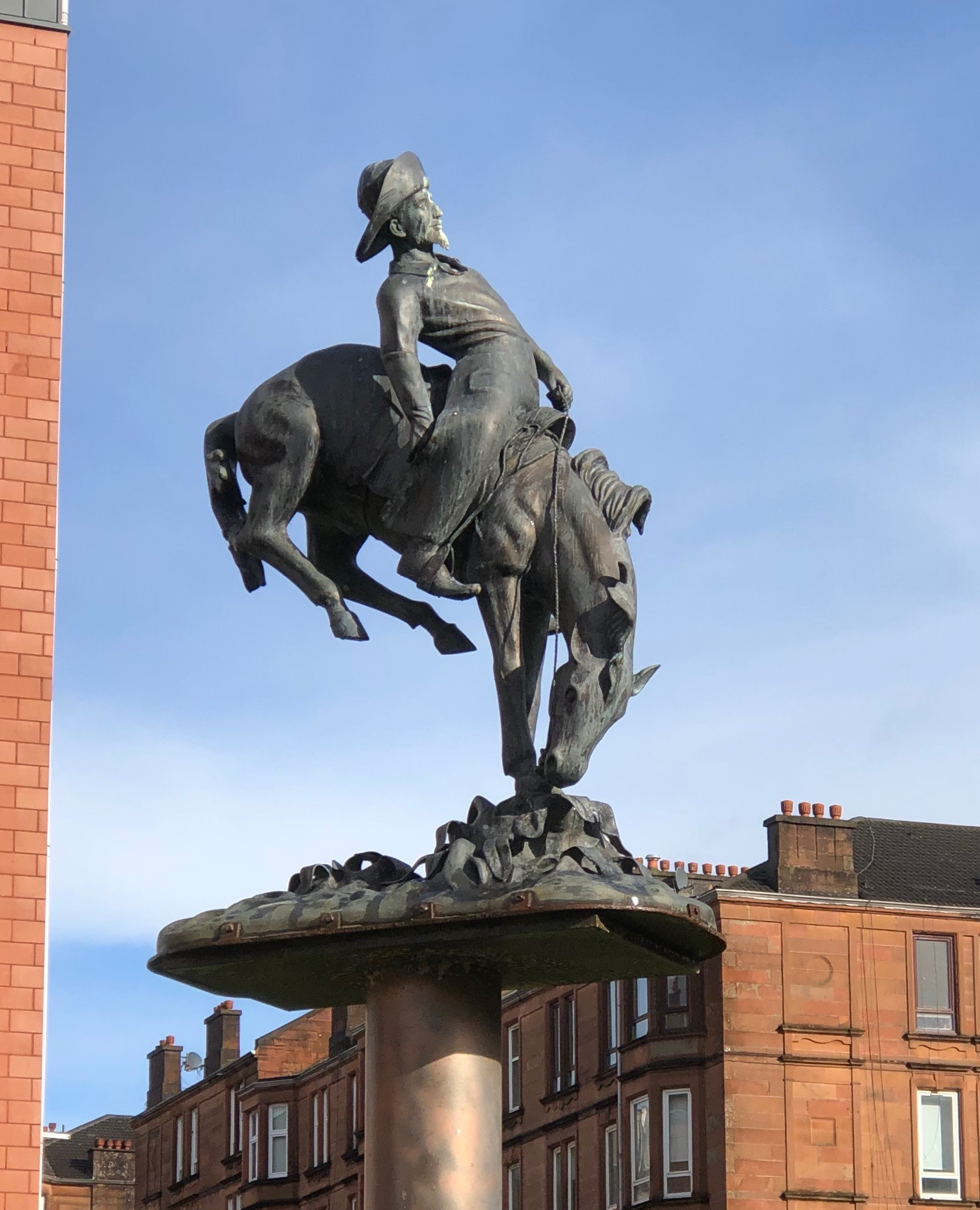
Buffalo Bill statue, on the site of the Whitehill School near the Exhibition Buildings location.

The Reformatory had been left empty for a number of years, in 1889 it was used as temporary accommodation for boys displaced when the training-ship HMS Cumberland was set on fire. With a large single storey extension added to its north, the building housed the Glasgow East-End Industrial Exhibition, which opened on 23 December 1890, to support establishment of a People's Palace in the east end of Glasgow. The East End Exhibition Buildings were converted into a 7,000 seat theatre for Buffalo Bill's Wild West Show which ran from 16 November 1891 to 27 February 1892. The large troupe included Annie Oakley and Lakota people, notably Kicking Bear.

From 1910, town plans show a skating rink in front of the Exhibition Buildings. A Palais de Danse was built on the site in 1922, but destroyed by a 1936 fire. After rebuilding, the Dennistoun Palais opened in 1938 with 1,800 capacity, the biggest dance hall in Glasgow. It closed in 1962, but was remembered in Hamish Imlach's song Cod Liver Oil and the Orange Juice.

Unable to attract the middle-class residents intended by its original developers, Dennistoun had established itself as a respectable working class area for families. After the Second World War, the area's Victorian tenements were refurbished and extended rather than replaced with high-rise modernist blocks as in other working-class districts such as neighbouring Calton and Parkhead, and this, coupled with proximity to the city centre and Caledonian and Strathclyde universities, has contributed to its gentrification in recent years; many of its residents are students and young professionals.

== Amenities ==
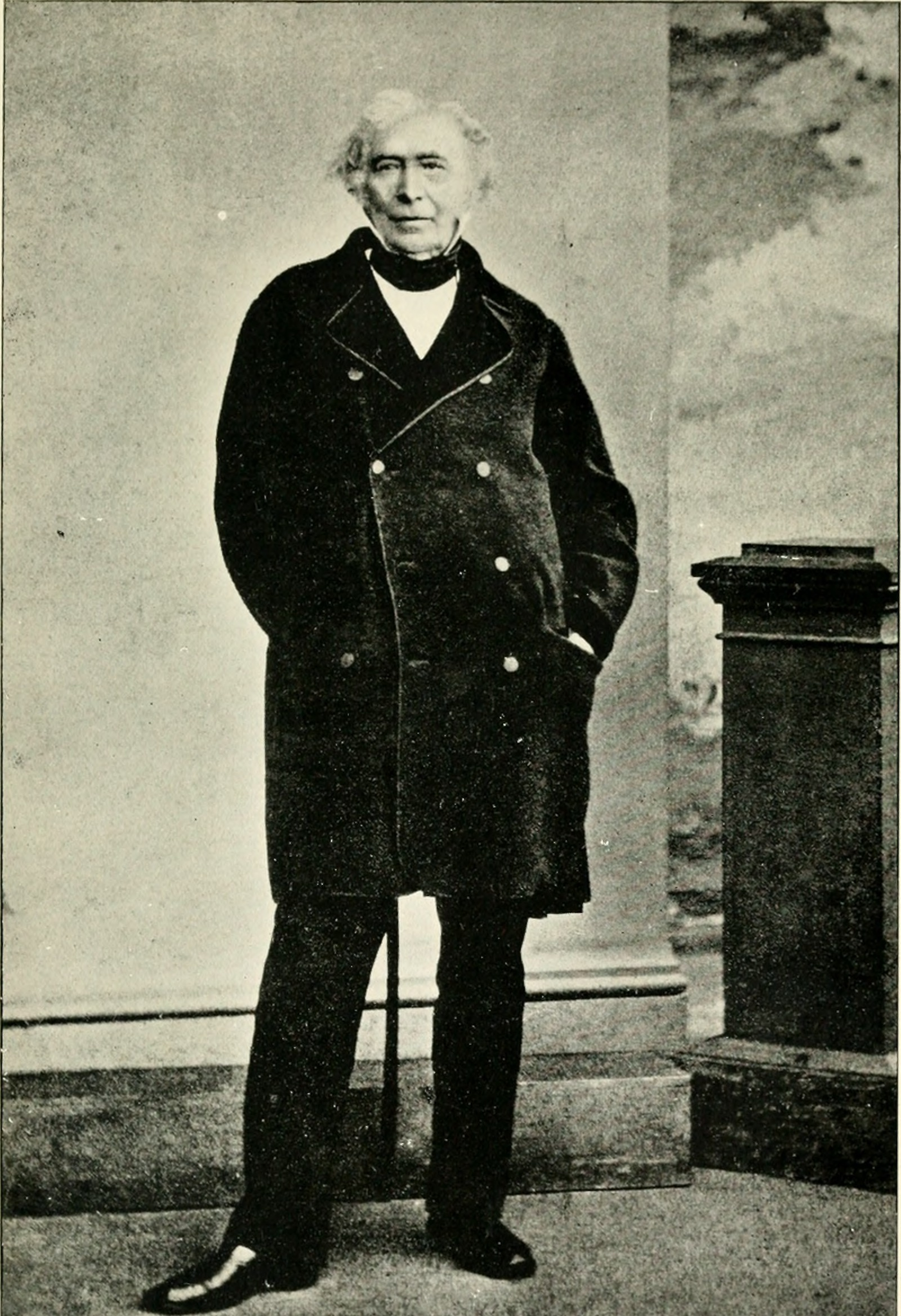
Alexander Dennistoun

=== Retail facilities ===
The community is well served by two shopping areas on Duke Street and Alexandra Parade. There are also two supermarkets and two long-established Italian delicatessens. Although the fortunes of local businesses have varied over the years, more recently a clear upturn in the number of independent retail and leisure premises has been apparent.

=== Parks ===
Dennistoun benefits from a large Victorian-era park, Alexandra Park, which is bounded predominantly by the M8 motorway, Cumbernauld Road and Provan Road. The Park takes its name from Princess Alexandra of Denmark, the wife of the future King Edward VII of the United Kingdom, who performed the official opening in 1870. The park was established in 1866 when the City Improvement Trustees purchased Alexandra Park from Mr Walter Stewart of Haghill under special powers conferred upon them by legislation. Mr Alexander Dennistoun, the proprietor of the adjoining estate of Golfhill, gave five acres (two hectares) of land to the City Improvement Trustees, situated near the south-west corner adjacent to Alexandra Parade, which now forms the principal pedestrian entrance.

The park is home to a 40-foot (12-metre) cast-iron Walter MacFarlane-built Saracen Fountain which was given to the city after the 1901 International Exhibition and remained in Kelvingrove Park for 12 years after the exhibition. In 1914, Glasgow Corporation took the decision to re-site this magnificent piece of industrial architecture to its present location. The fountain was restored to its former glory in 2000.

=== Arts ===
Dennistoun has one of Glasgow's original Carnegie libraries, deftly designed in the Edwardian Baroque style by James Robert Rhind.

Market Gallery, an artist-run contemporary art gallery, is located on Duke Street and spread over three shop units. WASPS artists' studios, a charity providing affordable studio space to support up to 750 artists, is located on Hanson Street.

=== Housing ===
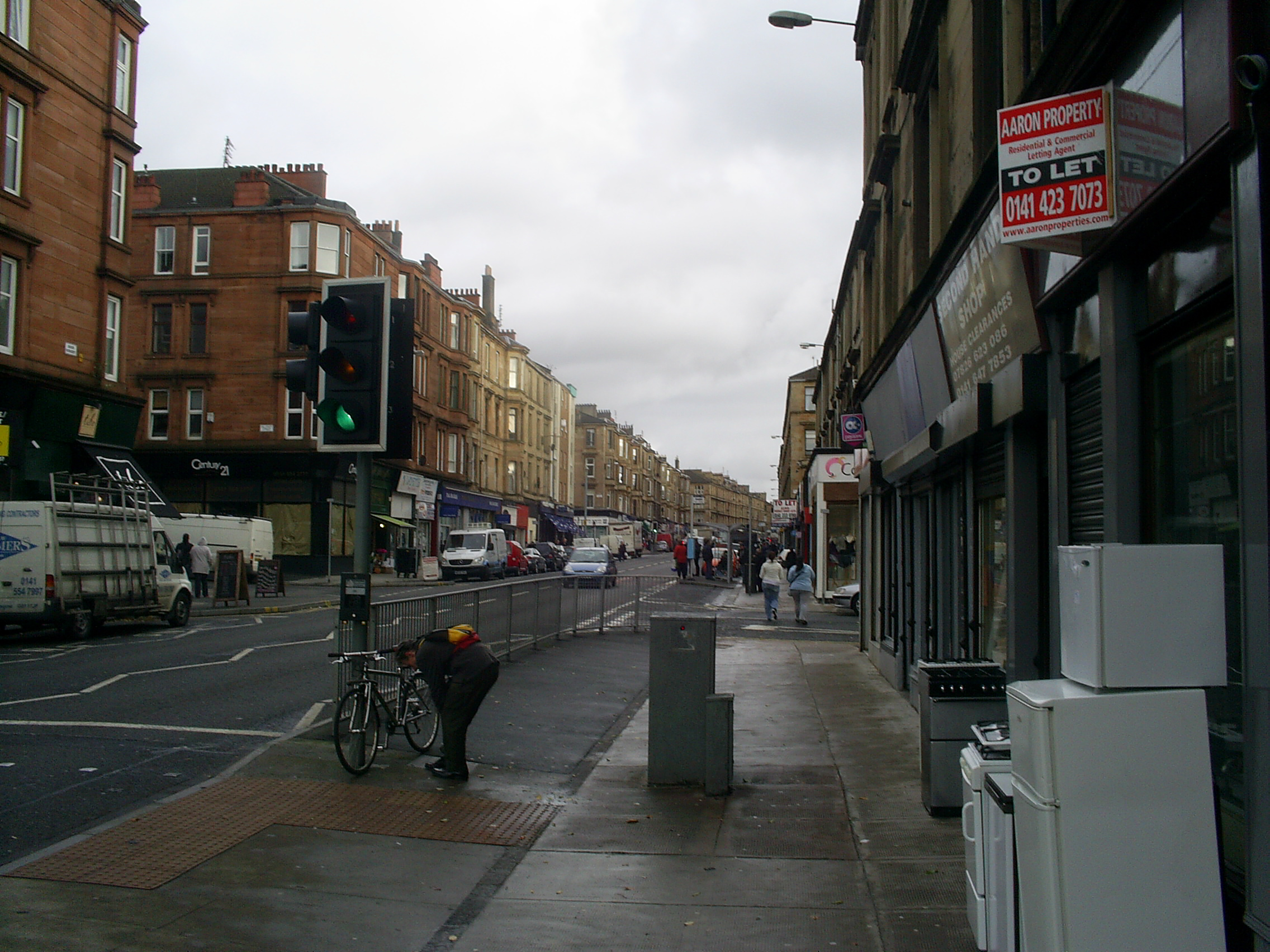
Duke Street running through Dennistoun area, flanked by red sandstone tenements with shops (2008)

Although predominantly consisting of three- and four-storey tenements, the Victorian villas and terraces to the west (towards the city centre) illustrate part of Alexander Dennistoun's original plan for the whole area. Dennistoun is made up of a number of smaller neighbourhoods including Milnbank to the north, 'The Drives' in the centre of the area and Bellgrove south of Duke Street - since 2007, the latter has fallen under a different multi-member council ward (Calton) from the rest of the district, and this situation remained even when the Dennistoun ward was created a decade later, with its boundaries instead including the Royston and Germiston neighbourhoods on the other side of the M8.

=== Education ===
There are three main primary schools in the greater Dennistoun area (excluding Haghill): Golfhill Primary, originally located on Circus Drive but now housed within the main building of Whitehill Secondary School (the original school building still stands, however remains derelict due to health and safety reasons. The school was built upon the site of a filled quarry and this has led to significant structural problems), Alexandra Parade Primary School located on Armadale Street and St Denis' RC Primary School on Meadowpark Street.

The only secondary school in the area is Whitehill Secondary School which is majority fed by pupils from Golfhill Primary, Alexandra Parade Primary and Haghill Primary. As it is a non-denominational school, most of the pupils from St Denis' go to St Mungo's Academy located on Crownpoint Road, Gallowgate.

=== Aquatic sports ===
Whitehill Pool was opened in 1978 and is shared with the neighbouring school It provides a 25m pool, small teaching pool, fitness suite, health suite and spectator gallery with over 200 seats and is situated on Onslow Drive.

As of 2026, the pool is closed due to the presence of RAAC in the building. There is a campaign to save the pool from permanent closure and demolition.

=== Religion ===
The area has a proliferation of churches, including the Church of Scotland, Roman Catholic (including Our Lady of Good Counsel, designed by noted Modern architects Gillespie, Kidd & Coia), Baptist, Salvation Army, independent Evangelical churches, Plymouth Brethren, Charismatic, one Scottish Episcopal Church and a Christadelphian presence.

In 2007 it was decided that the two Church of Scotland congregations, Dennistoun Blackfriars and Dennistoun Central churches, would unite to form Dennistoun New Parish Church. This followed long vacancies dating from 2000 (Dennistoun Blackfriars) and 2004 (Dennistoun Central).

=== Transport ===
The district is served by Alexandra Parade, Duke Street and Bellgrove railway stations (all on the North Clyde Line) as well as numerous bus routes, offering commuter services to the city centre and on toward the western suburbs.

== Demographics ==
In a 2004 census the area had a population of roughly 10,530.

== Notable people ==
- James Livingstone Begg, geologist
- Alex Rae, footballer
- Hugh Brown, Labour Party MP who earned the title "Red Clydesider"
- George Burt, cricketer
- Jon Campbell, producer (The Time Frequency)
- Stuart Cosgrove, broadcaster
- Rikki Fulton, entertainer
- Jack House, journalist and author
- Ford Kiernan, comedian
- Lulu, singer grew up in a top floor flat of 29 Garfield Street
- Angela McCluskey, singer-songwriter
- Charles Rennie Mackintosh, architect, designer and artist
- Jimmy Mason, footballer
- William Miller, poet (author of Wee Willie Winkie)
- Michelle Mone, Baroness Mone, businesswoman
- Dorothy Paul, entertainer
- Willie Sharp, footballer
- Flora Mc Donald (Mary Muir) Music Hall entertainer in the 1920s
- Jimmy Barnes, musician
