= Thomas Glenister =

English furniture manufacturer and politician

Thomas Glenister JP
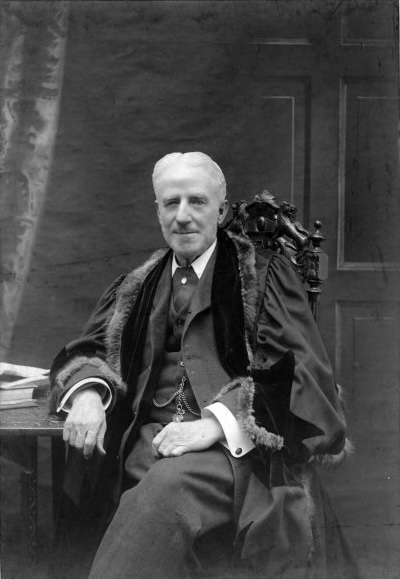
- Alderman Thomas Glenister, J.P.
- Born: 29 October 1838; High Wycombe, Buckinghamshire, England
- Died: 20 April 1919 (aged 80); London, England
- Occupations: Furniture manufacturer, magistrate, local politician
- Known for: Mayor of High Wycombe (1889–1891); first chair manufacturer to hold the office
- Spouse: Mary Griffin (m. 1860)

Thomas Glenister (29 October 1838 – 20 April 1919) (Note: A biographical entry in the British and Irish Furniture Makers Online (BIFMO) database gives Glenister's dates as 1837–1891; this conflicts with contemporary press reports of his golden wedding anniversary in 1910 and his death in 1919, and with the date of birth and death recorded in his obituary and death registration.) was an English furniture manufacturer, magistrate and local politician based in High Wycombe, Buckinghamshire. He led the chair-manufacturing firm founded by his father, was elected an alderman and appointed a Justice of the Peace, and served as Mayor of High Wycombe from 1889 to 1891, the first chair manufacturer to hold the office. Under Glenister's leadership, the firm produced a chair presented to Queen Victoria for her Golden Jubilee, and later provided all the chairs for the coronation of Edward VII. The firm continued as Thomas Glenister Ltd after his death.

== Early life and business career ==
Glenister was born in High Wycombe on 29 October 1838, the son of Daniel Glenister, who had founded a chair-manufacturing business in the town in 1839. Glenister joined the family firm as a young man and during his management, the firm and its site were expanded. Contemporary trade journals described Glenister as one of the leading figures in High Wycombe's chair trade.

During a dispute between the Chairmakers' Trade Union and local manufacturers in 1872, Glenister served as secretary of the Chair-manufacturers' Association, representing employers in the dispute.

In 1873 the firm took an order from the Moody and Sankey mission for some 19,300 public hall chairs, fulfilled in a few weeks by subcontracting to other High Wycombe and Stokenchurch manufacturers. The 1881 census recorded Glenister as employing twenty-five hands at the Temple End chair factory, to which he had moved his family home and manufacturing premises in 1879. The firm produced a commemorative chair presented to Queen Victoria for her Golden Jubilee in 1887. The chair is now in the Royal Collection (RCIN 2679). The following year, the firm completed an order of 3,500 chairs for the Glasgow International Exhibition.

Five examples of his firm's wood, upholstered, cane, rush and perforated-seat chairs were illustrated in The Furniture Gazette on 1 May 1888, in an issue that also described his sawmill operation.

By 1889, the firm was employing around 200 workers and producing approximately 300 dozen chairs per week Under Glenister's leadership, the firm supplied furniture for government departments, including seating for barracks, libraries and hospitals, and in 1902 supplied all the seating used at the coronation of King Edward VII at Westminster Abbey; examples of the coronation chairs are held in the National Trust collection at Lanhydrock, Cornwall.

A 1904 rating assessment appeal found in Glenister's favour, reducing his factory's assessed value by 30 per cent, with a surveyor describing the works as one of the most important chair factories in Wycombe, capable of employing around 300 hands.

In February 1908 the business was converted into a private limited company with a capital of £20,000, with Glenister as chairman, alongside his sons Thomas Glenister junior and Albert Glenister and managing director W. H. Healey.

In June 1911, in preparation for the coronation of George V, Glenister was quoted in the national press as an authority on chair making techniques, describing him as the acknowledged head of the Wycombe chair making industry.

== Public and civic life ==
Glenister served on the High Wycombe Parish Local Board for eleven years, having been elected in 1874 to succeed his father Daniel Glenister. Following the extension of the borough in 1880, he was elected to Wycombe Corporation, and in 1889 he was unanimously elected Mayor of High Wycombe, a role to which he was persuaded to be re-elected for a second year in 1890.

As Mayor, Glenister led the borough's reception of Lord Carrington on his return from New South Wales in December 1890, and served as chairman of the chair trade's presentation of an illuminated address to Lord and Lady Carrington, signed by around 2,000 members of the trade. In the same year, he twice sponsored outings for Sunday school children and chair-trade employees. When the re-seating of High Wycombe's town hall was proposed, Glenister and another local chair manufacturer, Mr. Birch, agreed to supply the necessary chairs free of charge to ratepayers.

Glenister welcomed Prince Albert Victor, Duke of Clarence and Avondale, to High Wycombe on 18 May 1891, during the Duke's visit to Lord Carrington at Wycombe Abbey, and presented him with a commemorative chair made by his firm.

Glenister was later promoted to the aldermanic bench of the town council. He was appointed to the Commission of the Peace for the Borough of Wycombe in 1903 and became a County Magistrate on 1 July 1907, retiring from public life later that year owing to ill health. He also served on a number of local educational, charitable and financial bodies, including the Wycombe Board of Guardians, School Board and Wycombe Savings Bank.

Glenister was long associated with the Wesleyan Sunday School in St Mary Street, where he served in various lay offices. In 1895 he became a member of the Church of England; on the completion of St John's Church, High Wycombe, he furnished the building with 500 chairs and presented a carved oak bishop's chair.

== Family ==
Glenister married Mary Griffin, daughter of a local High Wycombe family, at High Wycombe Parish Church on 22 March 1860. In March 1910, the couple marked their golden wedding anniversary, an occasion honoured by a public presentation from the management, staff and employees of Thomas Glenister Limited.

== Death ==
Glenister died suddenly on Easter Sunday, 20 April 1919, at a nursing home in London, aged 80. His funeral took place at High Wycombe Parish Church, led by the Bishop of Buckingham, with burial in the family grave; the borough council, the Wycombe Furniture Manufacturers' Federation and the Wycombe Borough Police were represented among the attendees. He left behind his widow, a daughter, and four sons.

== Legacy ==
The firm passed through successive generations of the family — his son William, grandson Frederick Hubert Glenister, and later great-grandsons Frank and Bernard. The firm went on to undertake commissions including work for the Houses of Parliament and stools for the Coronation of Elizabeth II before manufacturing ceased in 1990.
