= George Burt (cricketer) =

Scottish cricketer and educator

Personal information
- Full name: George Peter Burt
- Born: 11 November 1886; Dennistoun, Lanarkshire, Scotland
- Died: 20 January 1935 (aged 48); Bieldside, Aberdeenshire, Scotland
- Batting: Right-handed

Domestic team information
- Years: Team
- 1924–1925: Scotland

Career statistics
Competition	First-class
Matches	2
Runs scored	35
Batting average	11.66
100s/50s	–/–
Top score	26
Catches/stumpings	1/–
- Source: Cricinfo, 3 July 2022

George Peter Burt (11 November 1886 — 20 January 1935) was a Scottish first-class cricketer and businessman.

The son of Peter Burt, he was born in November 1886 at Dennistoun, Lanarkshire. Burt was a club cricketer for Uddingston Cricket Club, whom he captained for several years. He made two appearances in first-class cricket for Scotland against Ireland at Dundee in 1924, and Lancashire at Old Trafford during Scotland's 1925 tour of England. Described as a stylish batsman and one of the best Scotland had produced, he scored 35 runs in his two first-class matches, with a highest score of 26.

Outside of cricket, Burt was the director of the Acme Wringers company based in Bridgeton, Glasgow. He died at a nursing home in the Aberdeen suburb of Bieldside in January 1935, following a short illness; he was predeceased by his wife.
