= Alexandra Park, Glasgow =

Park in Glasgow, Scotland

Alexandra Park
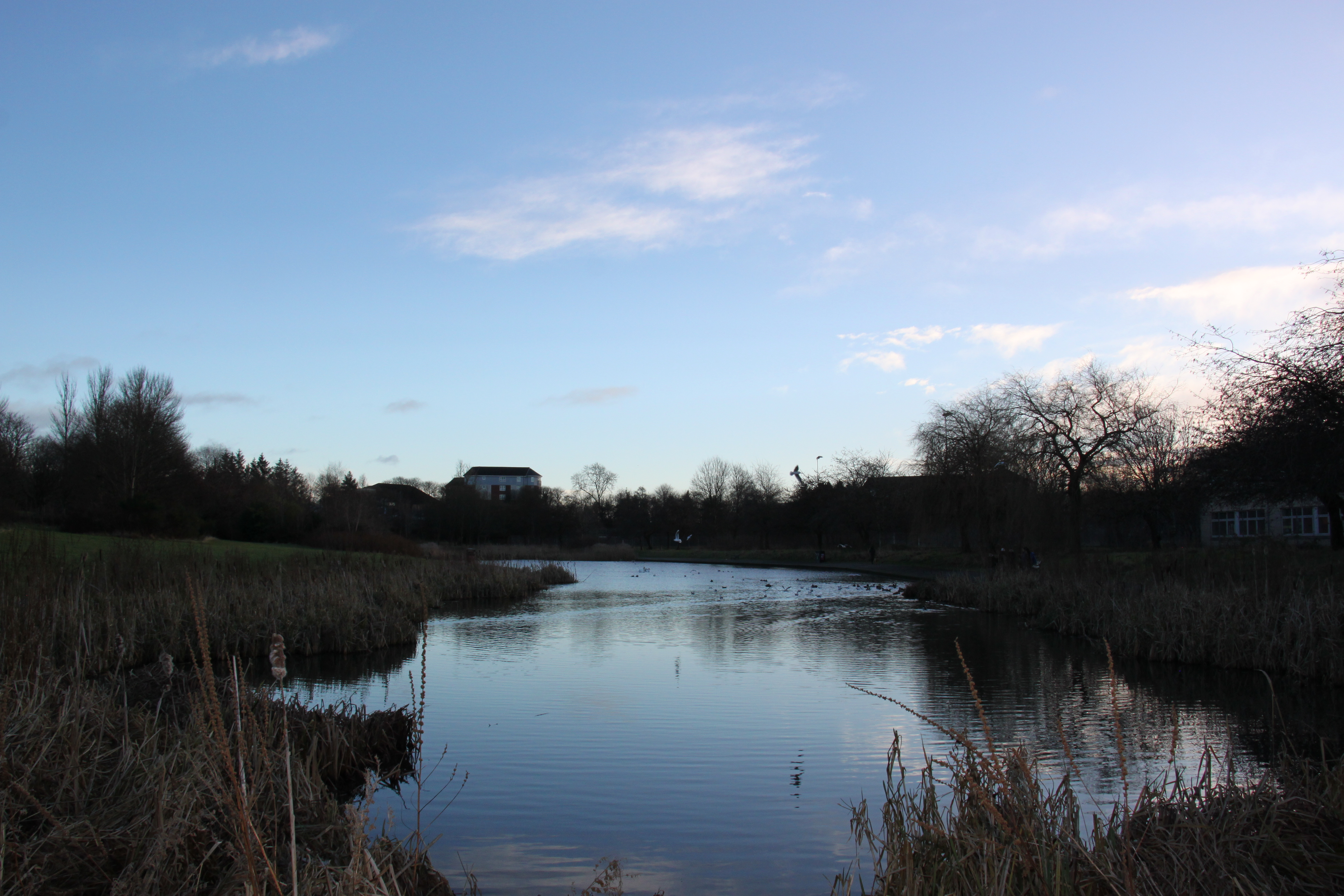
- The pond in Alexandra Park
- Interactive map of Alexandra Park
- Type: Public park
- Location: Glasgow, Scotland
- Coordinates: 55°51′57″N 4°12′14″W
- Area: 42 hectares (100 acres)
- Opened: 1870
- Operator: Glasgow City Council
- Public transit: Alexandra Parade railway station

Alexandra Park is a public park in the East End of Glasgow, Scotland. It is located in Dennistoun, 2 miles (3 km) east of the city centre. Named after Princess Alexandra of Denmark, it opened in 1870. The highest point of the park gives views north to Ben Lomond and south to the Tinto Hills. The park is generally open from dawn to dusk daily, but the facilities inside the park have separate opening and closing times accordingly.

== History ==
- 1866: The City Improvement Trustees of Glasgow purchased the land of Alexandra Park from Mr Walter Stewart with the intention of giving the people of the north-east of Glasgow a place of leisure and recreation. When the land was purchased it was bare and barren with hardly any trees. Ordnance Survey maps of this time show the land named as Tollcross Park.
- 1867–1868: Hundreds of unemployed artisans and labourers were employed to begin the renovation of the park to give them something to do during the great trade depression.
- 1870: The park is officially opened and named after Princess Alexandra of Denmark who was the wife of the future King Edward VII.
- 1873: Becomes home of Alexandra Athletic.

== Location ==
The park is located in the Dennistoun area (bordering Haghill) about two miles from Glasgow's city centre, It sits neatly between the M8 motorway to the north, Alexandra Parade/Cumbernauld Road (A8/A80) to the south, Provan Road (Riddrie) to the east and Sannox Gardens (Milnbank) to the west. It is about 42 hectares (100 acres) in area. Its most identifiable features are the two large pedestrian gates that can be seen from Alexandra Parade/Cumbernauld Road.

== Features ==
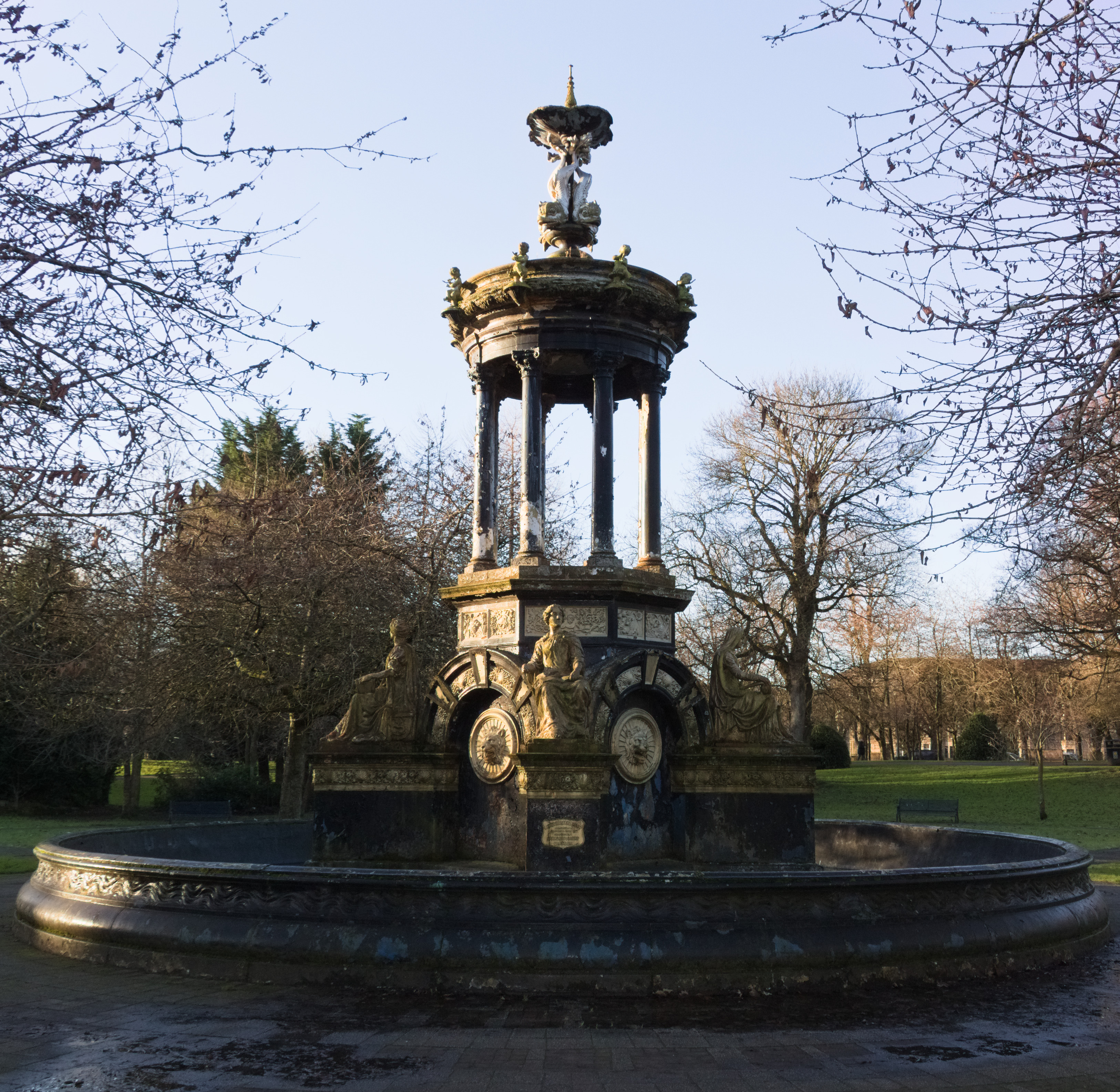
The Saracen Fountain in 2024.

One of the notable features of Alexandra Park is the 40-foot (12 m) cast-iron Walter MacFarlane-built Saracen Fountain, which was gifted to the city of Glasgow after the 1901 International Exhibition and remained in Kelvingrove Park for 12 years after the exhibition. In 1914, Glasgow Corporation took the decision to re-site the fountain to its present location. In 2000, the fountain was restored at a cost of £22,000.

Alexandra Park Golf Club is a nine-hole golf course situated inside the park. The course closed in 2020.

== See also ==
- Glasgow Golf Club
