= Theatro José de Alencar =

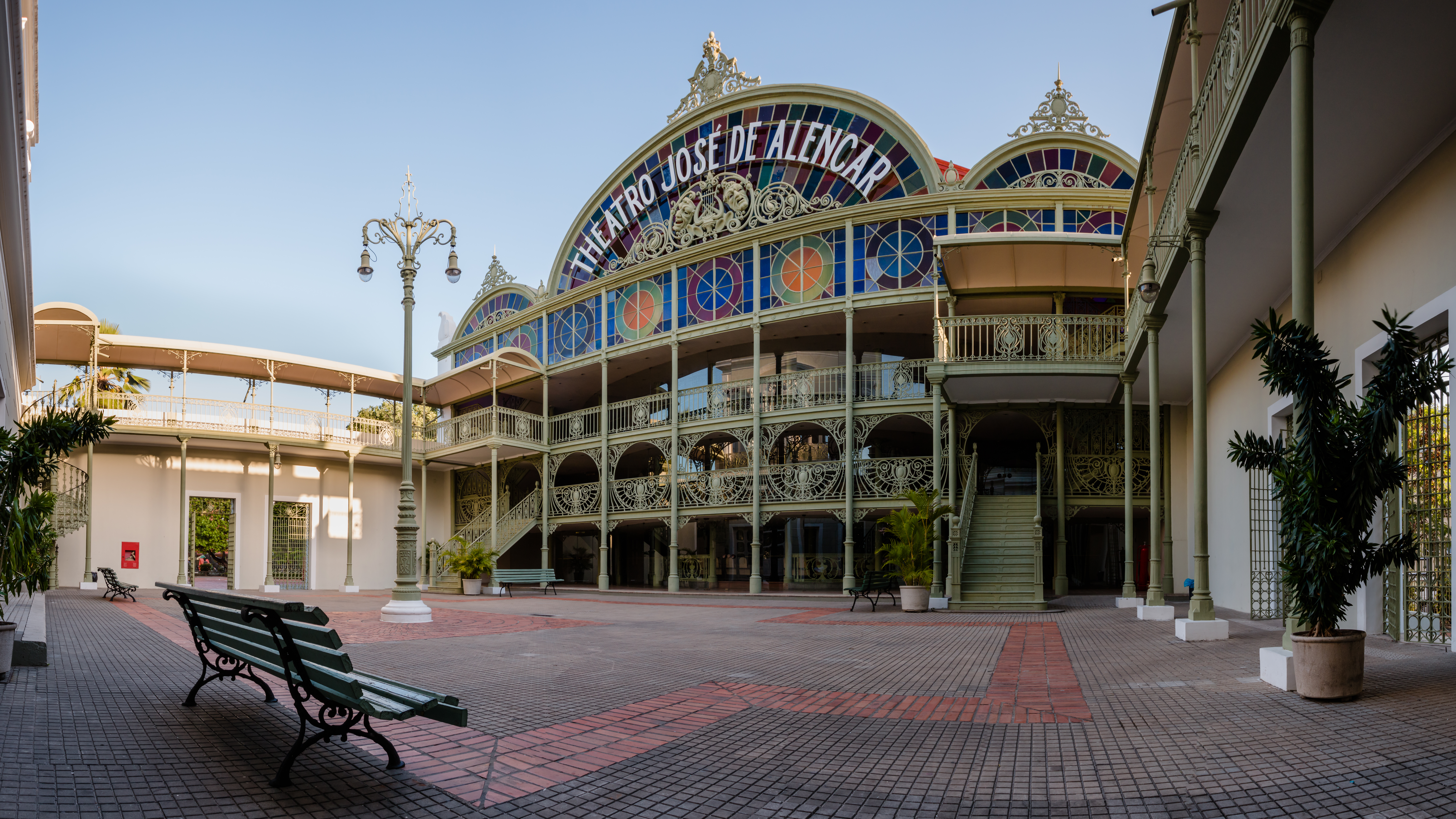
- Interactive map of the Theatro José de Alencar area

General information
- Location: Fortaleza, Brazil
- Coordinates: 3°43′39.52″S 38°31′53.99″W
- Opened: 1910

National Historic Heritage of Brazil
- Designated: 1962
- Reference no.: 650

The Theatro José de Alencar is a Brazilian theater located in the city of Fortaleza, Ceará.

== History ==
It was officially opened on June 17, 1910, and features eclectic architecture of the theater in the Art Nouveau style, 120-seat auditorium, foyer, stage space open and annex building, with two thousand square feet that houses the Center for the Arts Scenic (CENA), the Teatro Morro do Ouro, with capacity for 90 people, the square Mestre Pedro Boca Rica, outdoor stage and seating for 600 people, the Chamber's Carlos; Gallery Cotoco Ramos, four study rooms and tests; cenotécnica workshops, costume and lighting, the College of Dance of Ceará and the College of Theater Director, Office of Sea Dragon, the Chamber Orchestra of Eleazar de Carvalho, and the course Fundamentals of Theater.

The cornerstone of the theater was launched in 1896, the center of the square of the Marquis Herval today square José de Alencar, but the original design was not realized. In 1904 it was officially authorized the construction of the Theatro José de Alencar, by law 768 of August 20. On June 6, 1908, the works officially started. Cast iron parts of the theater structure were made and imported from the Saracen Foundry (also known as Walter MacFarlane & Co.) in Glasgow, Scotland.

At the beginning of the century, to the architectural design of the Theatro José de Alencar, Captain Bernardo José de Mello imagined a theater garden. But the same garden, was built only years after the opening ceremony, the reform which lasted from 1974 to April 1975. The garden occupies the space next door to the theater, from the east.

The new building, known as the Annex, was incorporated into the Theatro José de Alencar's pension reform from 1989 to 1990.

== Protected status ==
The Theatro José de Alencar was listed as a historic structure by the National Historic and Artistic Heritage Institute in 1975. The structures was registered under the Book of Historical Works, Inscription 653-T and Book of Fine Arts, Inscription fl 76. Both directives are dated November 17, 1975.
