= Saracen Fountain =

Fountain in Alexandra Park, Glasgow, Scotland, UK

Coordinates: 55°51′52″N 4°12′30″W

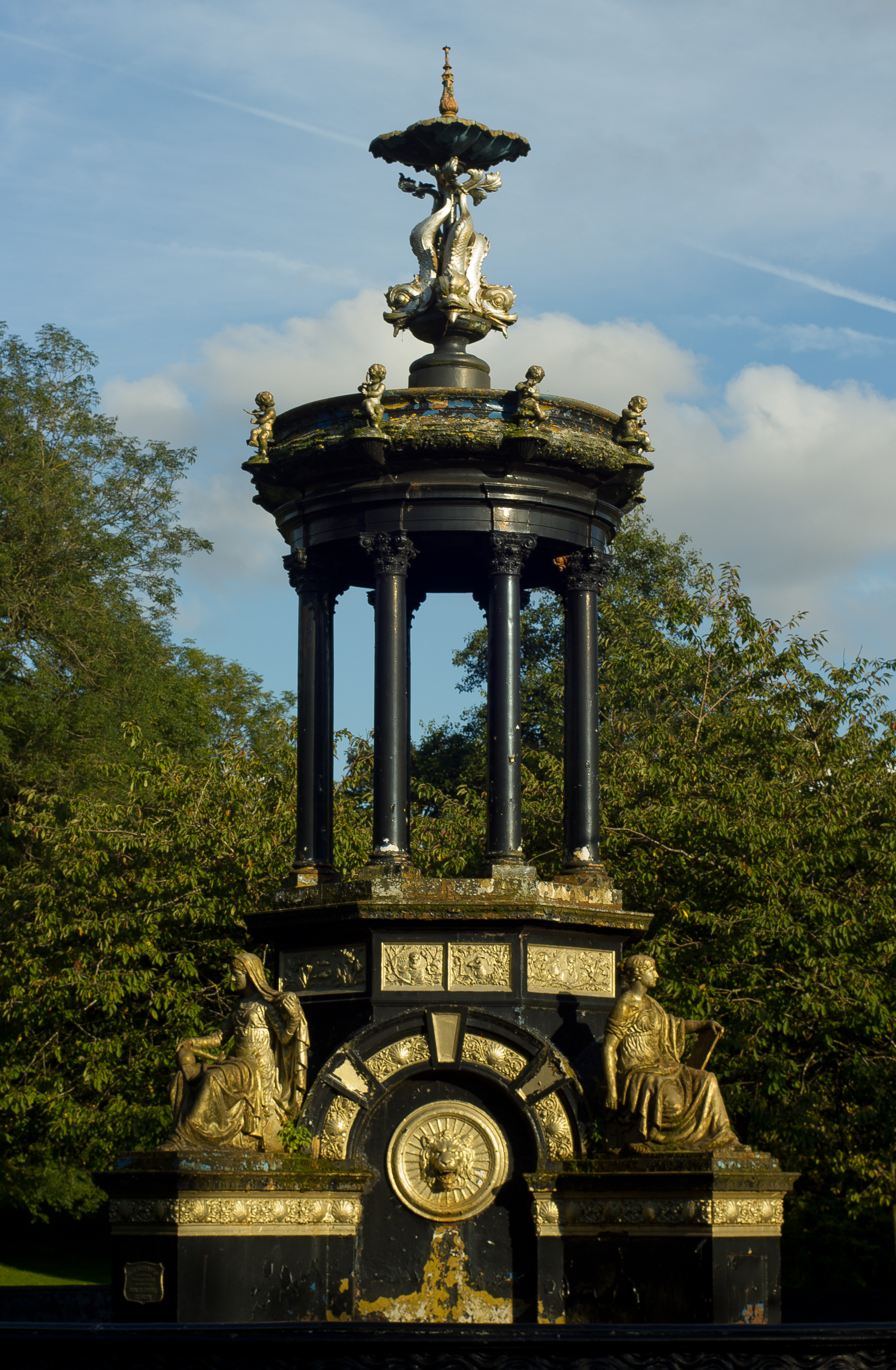
Saracen fountain

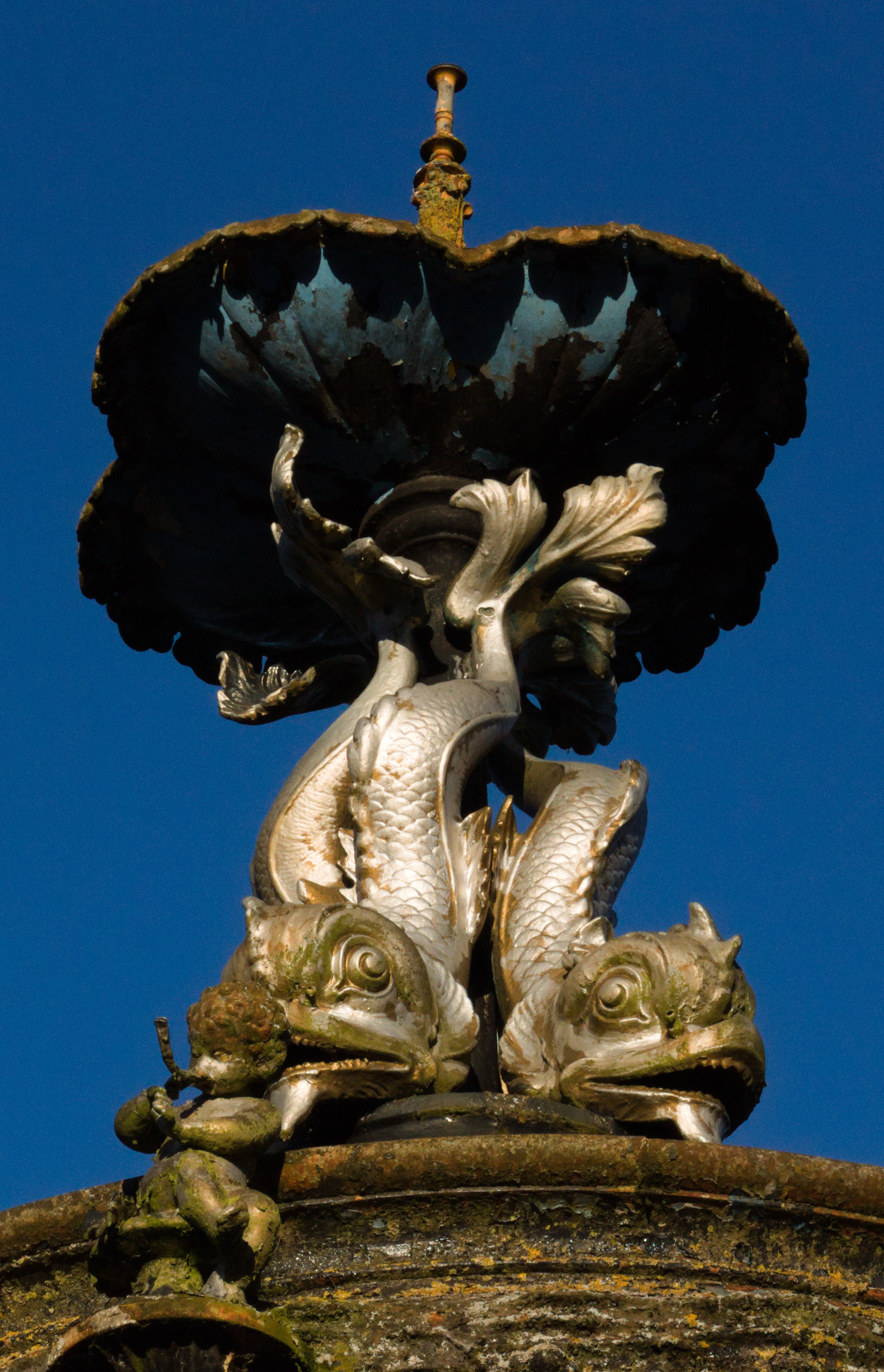
Dragons on the tip of the fountain

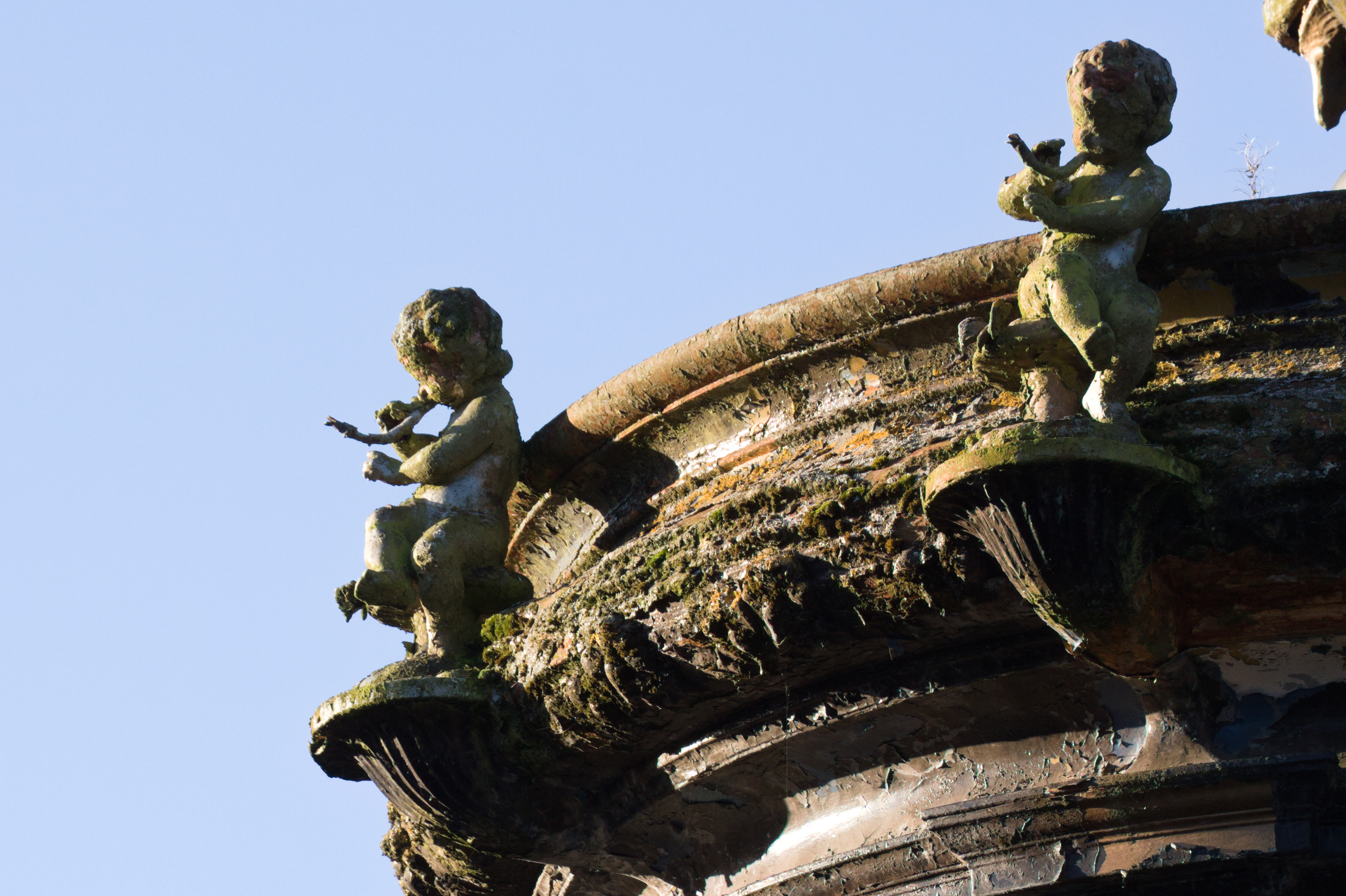
Babies on the rim of the top of the fountain

The Saracen Fountain is a large, ornate fountain located in Alexandra Park, Glasgow, Scotland. It was made of cast iron by Macfarlane & Co.'s Saracen Foundry for the 1901 Glasgow International Exhibition and presented to the city as a gift by foundry owner Walter Macfarlane. The fountain was originally located in Kelvingrove Park. It is influenced by the Choragic Monument of Lysicrates in Athens.

It is now a Category A listed building.

== Bibliography ==
- Dobraszczyk, Paul (2017). "Iron, Ornament and Architecture in Victorian Britain ": "Myth and Modernity, Excess and Enchantment ". Routledge. ISBN 978-1-351-56209-6.
