= Glasgow International Exhibition (1901) =

1901 international exposition in Glasgow

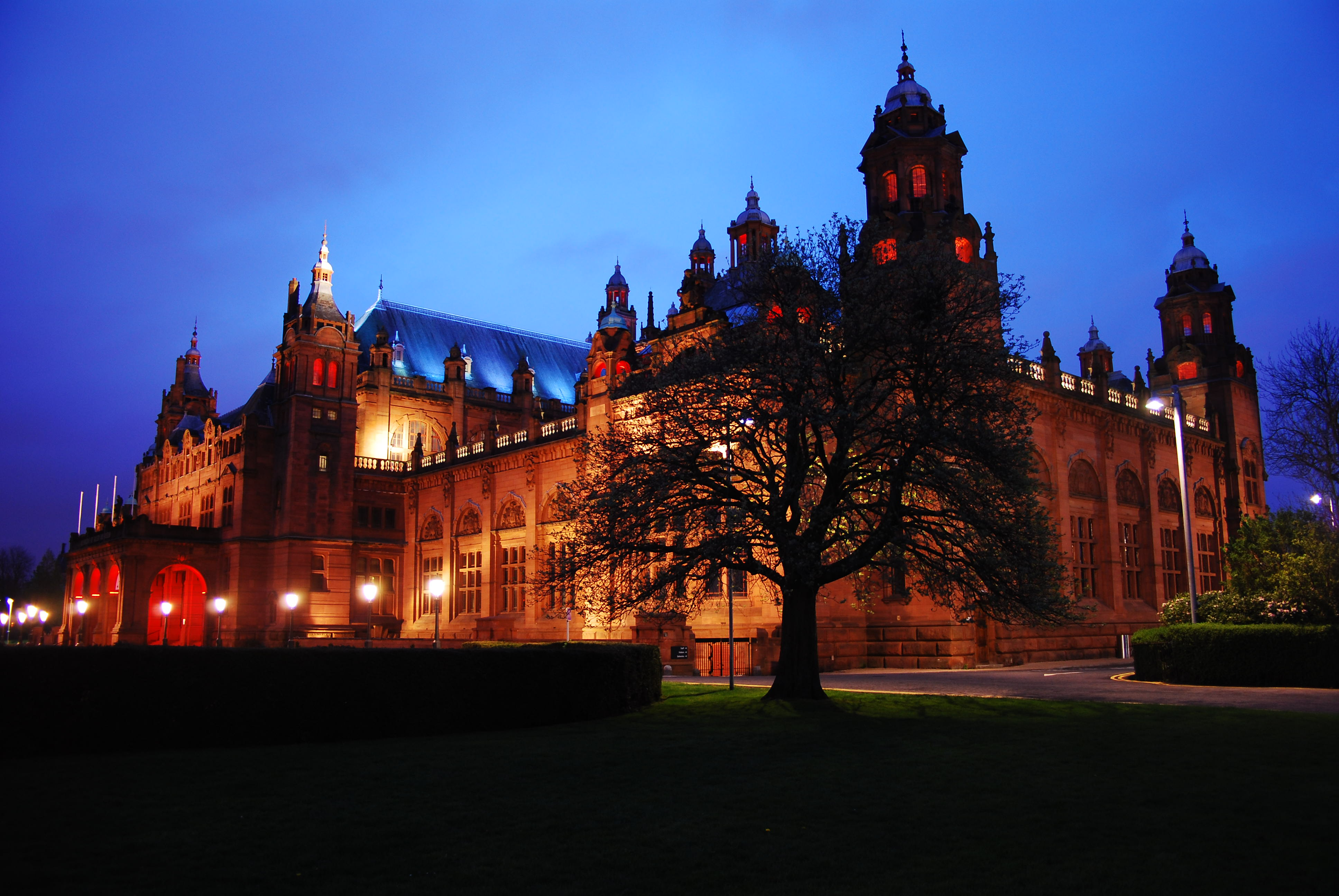
- The Palace of Fine Arts at the exhibition remained as a permanent legacy

Overview
- BIE-class: Unrecognized exposition
- Name: Glasgow International Exhibition

Location
- Country: United Kingdom of Great Britain and Ireland
- City: Glasgow
- Venue: Kelvingrove Park

Timeline
- Opening: 2 May 1901
- Closure: 4 November 1901

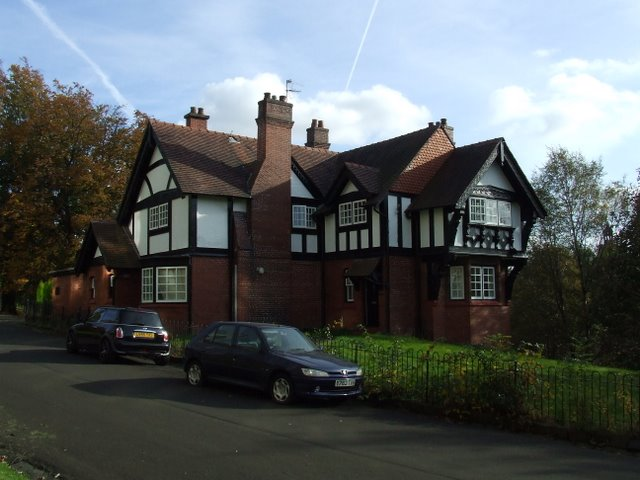
The Port Sunlight cottages in Kelvingrove Park are some of the few remaining original buildings from the 1901 exhibition.

The Glasgow International Exhibition was the second of 4 international exhibitions held in Glasgow, Scotland during the late 19th and early 20th centuries. The exhibition took place during a period of half-mourning requested by Edward VII but was still popular and made more than £35000 profit. The exhibition was opened by the King's daughter, the Princess Louise, Duchess of Fife.. It was presided over by a "Citizen Council". Its members included Grace Paterson, Sir William Arrol, Sir Charles Tennant and Sir David Richmond

== Exhibits ==
The exhibition followed the lead of the first Glasgow exhibition, the International Exhibition of Science, Art and Industry, held in 1888, taking place in Kelvingrove Park. It ran between 2 May and 4 November. It marked the opening of the city's Kelvingrove Art Gallery and Museum and also commemorated the fiftieth anniversary of the first world's fair held in the UK, doubling that attendance with 11.5 million visits.

Following the style popularised at the 1893 Chicago world's fair, the main exhibition building was in Renaissance-Baroque style. But the large industrial hall contrasted strongly having a large white facade with Spanish, Turkish and Venetian ornamentation and a large golden dome atop. This design by James Miller won him one of his many awards.

Countries with close ties to Glasgow exhibited including Japan, Canada and Russia. The Russian exhibition was the largest, a 'Russian village' of 4 pavilions reported to have cost the Tsar of Russia £30,000 and included several brightly coloured buildings designed by Fyodor Schechtel.

Whilst Charles Mackintosh's designs for the major exhibition halls were rejected, he did design four pavilions for commercial organisations, and one for the Glasgow School of Art.

Many art works were displayed, including Danae by Edward Burne-Jones, a plaster version of Rodin's Burghers of Calais and 160 works loaned by William Burrell.

Entertainments included a switchback railway, a water chute, an Indian theatre and soap sculptures.

The fair was visited by the King of Siam and by Empress Eugenie.

== Legacy ==
The land used for the exhibition remains a park, Kelvingrove Park, the 40 foot cast-iron Walter MacFarlane Saracen Fountain from the Saracen Foundry now resides in the city's Alexandra Park and the two Port Sunlight cottages, designed by Glasgow architect James Miller, can still be found in Kelvingrove Park.

== See also ==
- Glasgow International Exhibition Cup (football tournament during the festival)
- International Exhibition of Science, Art and Industry (1888)
- Scottish Exhibition of National History, Art and Industry (1911)
- Empire Exhibition, Scotland 1938
- Glasgow Garden Festival (1988)

== External sources ==
- http://www.theglasgowstory.com/imageview.php?inum=TGSA00363 image of the opening of the exhibition

Preceded by International Exhibition of Science, Art and Industry	World's Fairs held in Glasgow; 1901	Succeeded by Scottish Exhibition of National History, Art and Industry
