= International Exhibition of Science, Art and Industry =

1888 exhibition in Glasgow, Scotland

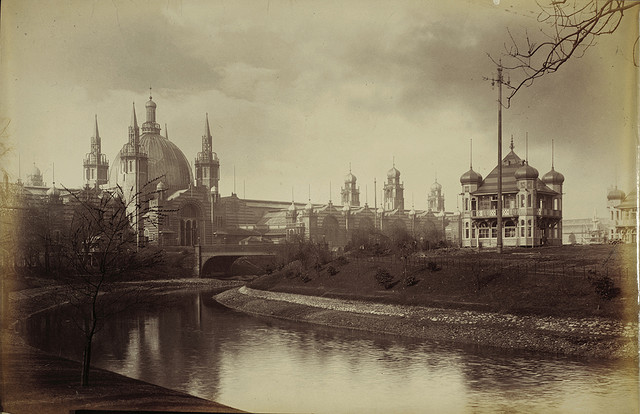

Overview
- BIE-class: Unrecognized exposition
- Name: International Exhibition of Science, Art and Industry
- Visitors: 5,748,379

Location
- Country: Scotland
- City: Glasgow
- Coordinates: 55°52′6″N 4°17′11″W

Timeline
- Opening: 8 May 1888
- Closure: November 1888

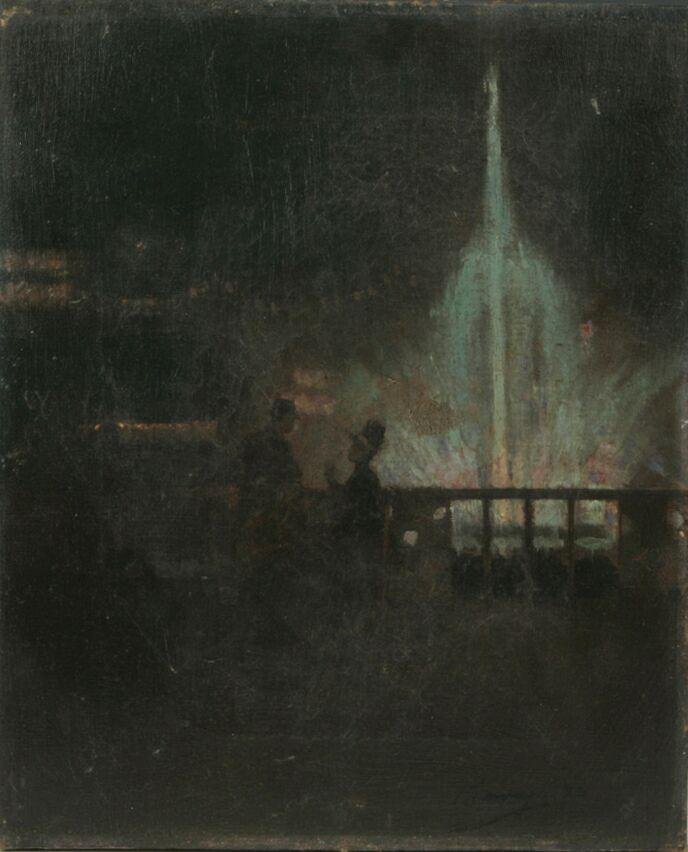
The 'Fairy Fountain' at the exhibition, by John Lavery

The International Exhibition of Science, Art and Industry was the first of 4 international exhibitions held in Glasgow, Scotland, during the late 19th and early 20th centuries. It took place at Kelvingrove Park between May and November 1888. The main aim of the exhibition was to draw international attention to the city's achievements in applied sciences, industry and the arts during the Industrial Revolution. However, it was also hoped the Exhibition would raise enough money for a museum, art gallery and school of art in the city. The exhibition was opened by the Prince of Wales, as honorary president of the exhibition, on 8 May 1888. It was the greatest exhibition held outside London and the largest ever in Scotland during the 19th century.

== Design ==
The buildings for the Exhibition were designed by competition winning Glaswegian architect James Sellars. Sellars decided on an oriental style which "lends itself readily to execution in wood." The buildings were however temporary, and consideration had to be given to ease of dismantling them once the exhibition was over.

The Main Building, which housed most of the exhibits, occupied an area of Kelvingrove Park between the River Kelvin and Sandyford Street which is now on the route of Sauchiehall Street. It featured a 170 ft high Dome erected on an iron framework covered in galvanised sheet iron. Four octagonal supporting towers around the Dome were made of brick, with minarets on top.

== Exhibits ==
=== Industrial ===
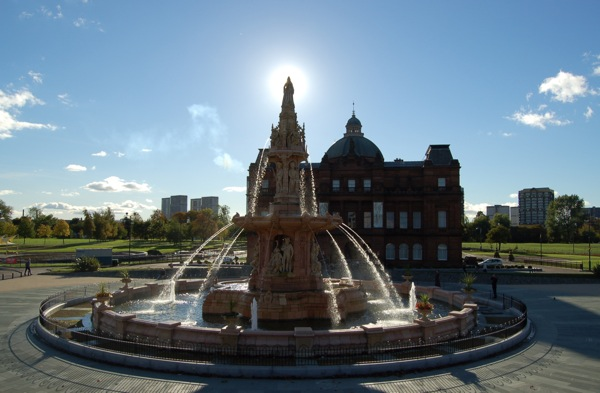
The Doulton Fountain

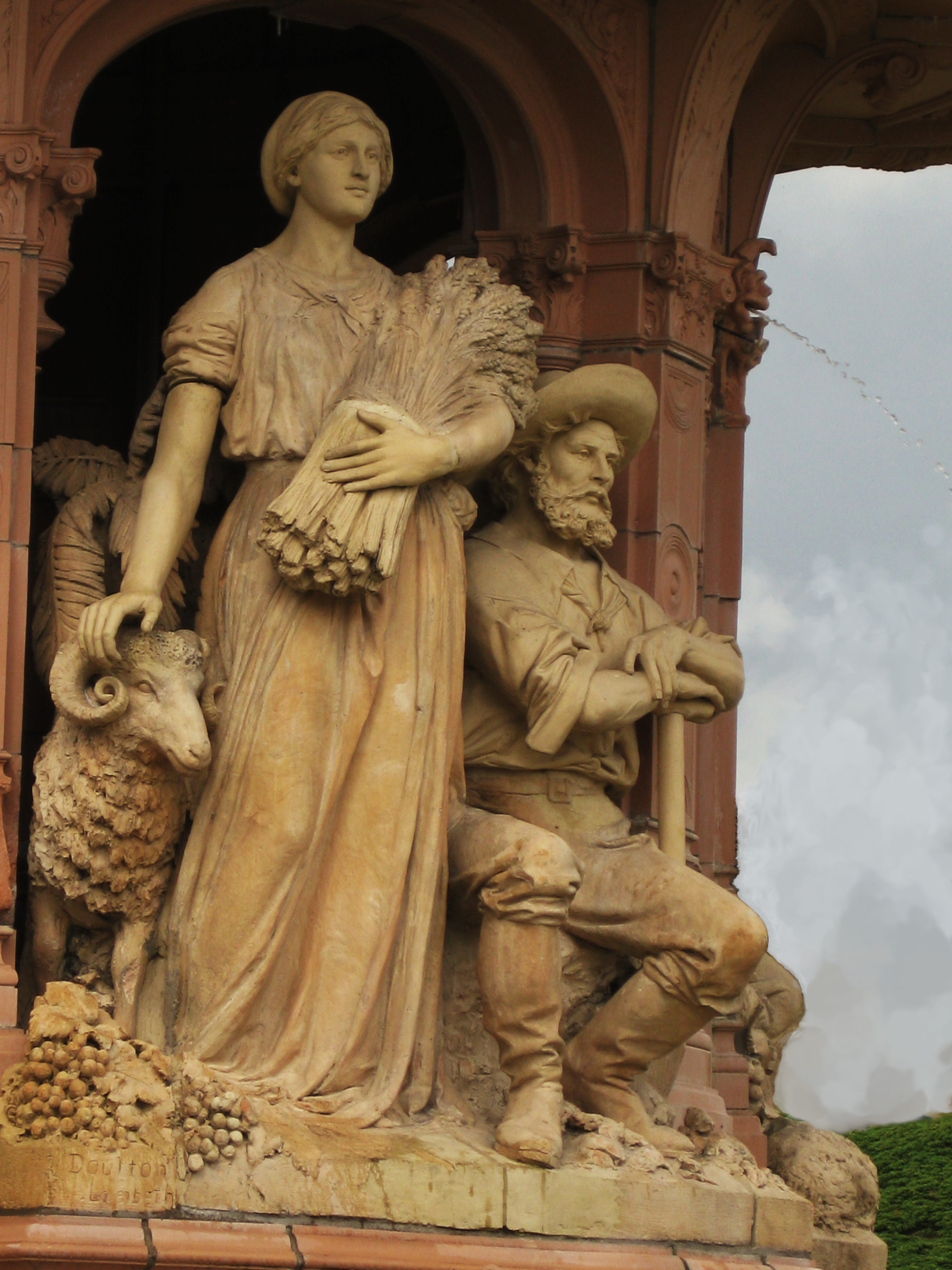
Detail from the Doulton Fountain

Scottish firms accounted for two-thirds of the exhibitors at the International Exhibition of 1888, with many Glasgow firms featuring prominently. The majority of the third that came from outwith Scotland were from England, with London providing the largest number, followed by Lancashire and Yorkshire. India and Canada were the principal origin of non-British exhibitors. Of the seventy firms from outwith the British Empire, most were from France, Germany, Italy and the USA.

One of the main British commercial exhibitors was Doulton & Co, who presented The Doulton Fountain to the city after the International Exhibition of 1888. Originally situated in Kelvingrove Park during the exhibition, the massive terracotta structure was later moved to Glasgow Green in 1890. At 46 ft high, with its outer basin measuring 70 ft in diameter, it remains the biggest fountain of its kind in the world.

=== Recreation ===
More populist attractions which were intended to broaden the exhibition's appeal to the public were kept separate from the main academic and industrial exhibits, sited in an area between the University of Glasgow and the west bank of the River Kelvin.

One of the most popular attractions was a switchback railway. Other popular attractions included a shooting gallery, a captive air balloon and regular musical performances by bands. Sports events such as football matches, cycle racing and highland games were held in the adjacent University Athletics Ground.

The River Kelvin itself was an important feature at the International Exhibition of 1888. It was specially deepened and cleaned for the occasion. Exhibition goers could take trips on the river in electric and steam-powered launches as well as on a gondola imported from Venice. The latter proved particularly popular, as were the two gondoliers, nicknamed "Signor Hokey" and "Signor Pokey".

== Impact ==
When the Exhibition closed in November 1888, the final attendance figure was 5,748,379. A profit of £43,000 was further evidence of the Exhibition's success, with the money going towards the construction of the Kelvingrove Art Gallery and Museum, which functioned as the Palace of Fine Arts for the subsequent Glasgow International Exhibition, also held at Kelvingrove Park, in 1901.

== See also ==
- Glasgow International Exhibition (1901)
- Scottish Exhibition of National History, Art and Industry (1911)
- Empire Exhibition, Bellahouston Park (1938)
- Glasgow Garden Festival (1988)
- Festivals in Glasgow

Preceded by None	World's Fairs held in Glasgow; 1888	Succeeded by Glasgow International Exhibition
