= Saracen Foundry =

Former ironworks in Glasgow

Coordinates: 55.88748°N 4.25412°W

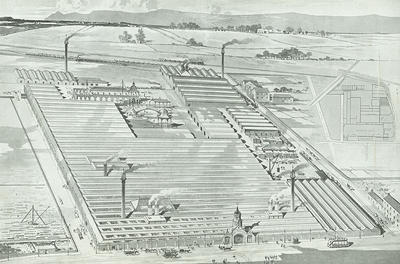
Saracen Foundry, Possilpark, Glasgow c. 1890

The Saracen Foundry was the better-known name for the Possilpark, Glasgow-based foundry company W MacFarlane & Co. Ltd, founded and owned by Walter MacFarlane. MacFarlane's was the most important manufacturer of ornamental ironwork in Scotland.

== Walter Macfarlane ==
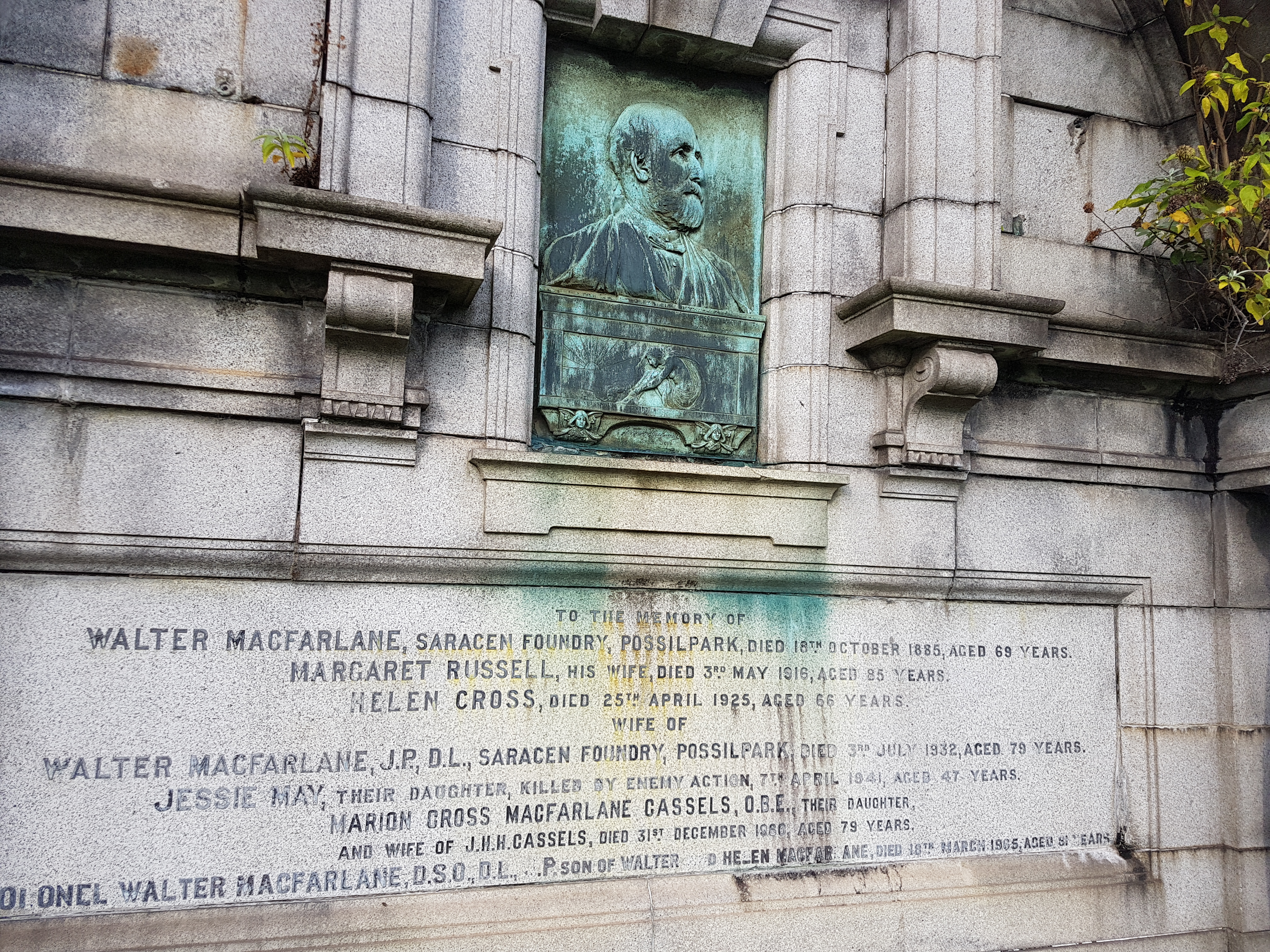
Tomb of Walter MacFarlane, Glasgow Necropolis.

Walter Macfarlane was born in Torrance of Campsie, near Glasgow, in 1817. He worked for the jeweller William Russell, before serving an apprenticeship with blacksmith James Buchanan. He then spent a decade working for Moses, McCulloch & Co's Cumberland Foundry in Stockwell Street.

With his own main home at 22 Park Circus, Glasgow, Macfarlane became a prominent figure in local politics, becoming the President of the Glasgow Liberal Association and a City Councillor. He died in 1885, and is buried in Glasgow Necropolis cemetery.

== Saracen Foundry ==
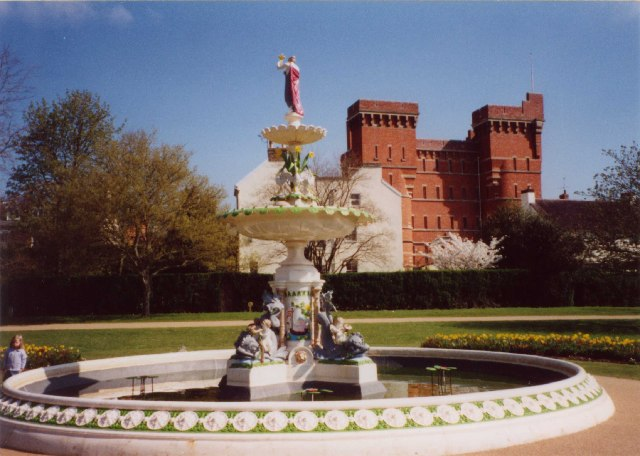
Victoria memorial water fountain, Vivary Park, Taunton, Somerset

MacFarlane, with partners Thomas Russell and James Marshall, incorporated W MacFarlane & Co. Ltd in 1850. They took over a foundry works in Saracen Lane, behind the Saracen Head Inn, in the Gallowgate. The foundry had previously (from at least 1825) been in the control of Stephen Miller (father of Daniel Miller). In 1862 the business relocated briefly to Washington Street.

=== Possilpark ===
But the business kept growing, and MacFarlane needed a vast area of land on which to build both a foundry and a village-styled infrastructure on which to house his workforce. He agreed a deal with the son of Colonel Alexander Campbell of Possil to buy 100 acres (40 hectares) of his Possil estate in the mid-1860s, including the main estate house where Sir Archibald Alison, 1st Baronet the Sheriff of Lanarkshire resided, on which to build his new foundry works.

MacFarlane oversaw the removal of all the trees, creating the foundry on 14 acres (5.5 hectares), with its main gates at 73 Hawthorn Street. After creating railway access to his foundry from both the North British Railway and the Hamiltonhill Branch of the Caledonian Railway, MacFarlane laid out the rest of the park land as streets and houses, including naming the street fronting his factory "Saracen Street."

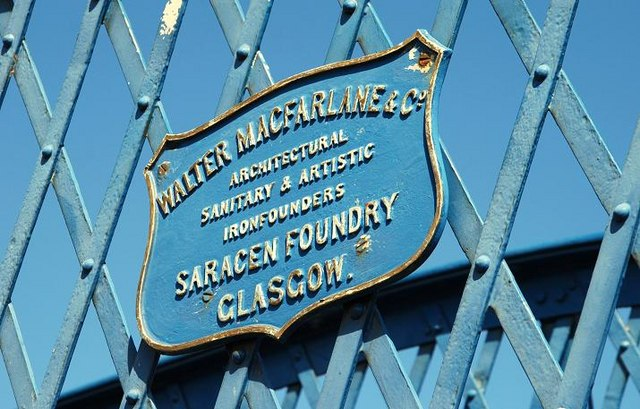
The plaque of the Saracen Foundry, on the bridge at Whitehead railway station, Northern Ireland

MacFarlane renamed the location Possilpark, which went from being residence to 10 people in 1872, to 10,000 in less than two decades later in 1891. The developing layout of Possilpark was described by the then Glasgow Town Council as: "Their work is one of the finest and best conducted in Glasgow, and the new suburb of Possil Park, laid out by them with skill and intelligence, is rapidly becoming an important addition to the great city." Ironically, the foundry's pollution earned Macfarlane the nickname "the Laird of Fossiltown."

=== Design-led expansion ===
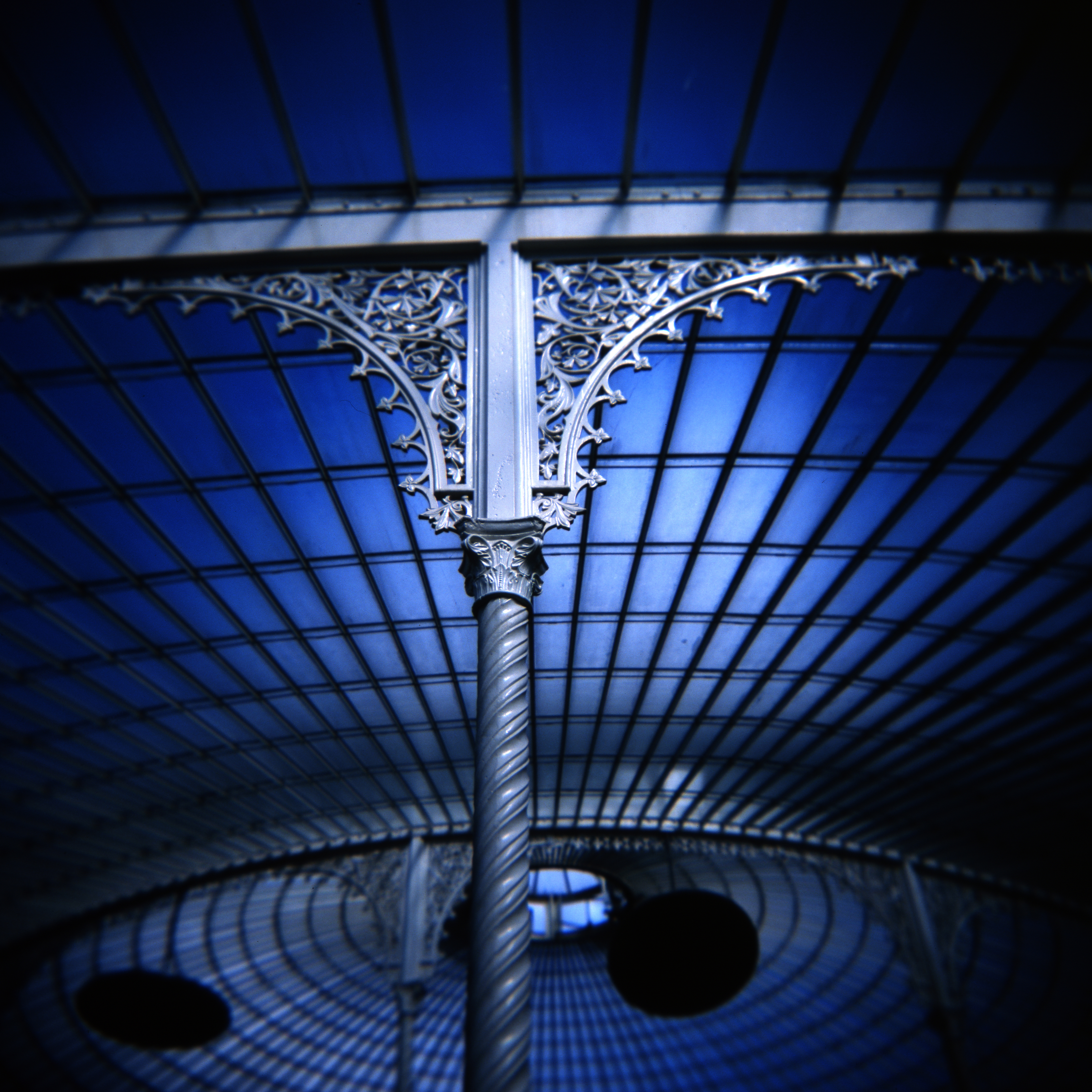
Cast iron work details on the Kibble Palace, Glasgow Botanic Gardens

Having joined the firm in 1871, in 1880 Macfarlane's nephew, Walter Macfarlane II (1853–1932), became a partner. On succeeding to the position of owner at the death of his uncle, the young MacFarlane set about making design and standardisation the key to the company's development.

Subsequently, the Saracen Foundry made to a set of standard designs, a series of decorative iron works, from railings, drinking fountains, bandstands, street lamps, pre-fabricated buildings and architectural features. To achieve the design edge they required, the firm employed the best Glasgow architects, including John Burnet, James A Ewing, James Sellars, and Alexander 'Greek' Thomson. James Boucher was commissioned to design the show rooms of the Possilpark foundry as a gigantic showcase for the products, complete with a glass and iron dome and elaborate decorative castings on its Gothic gateway. The works were exported all over the British Empire, and can still be found in abundance in many parts of North Glasgow.

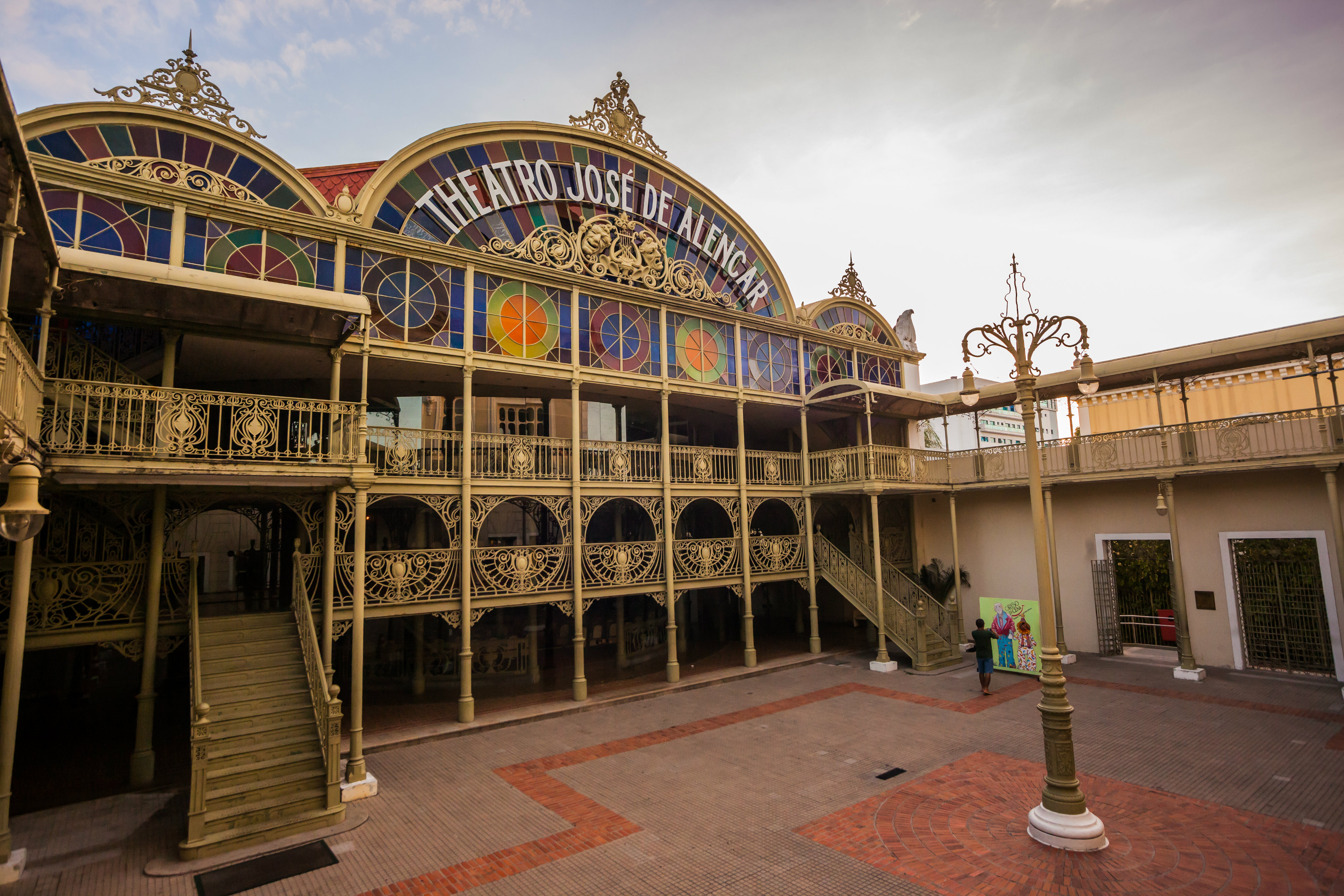
Internal facade of Theatro José de Alencar in Fortaleza, Brazil

Macfarlane's most celebrated work is the Saracen Fountain in Alexandra Park, Glasgow, which they gave to the city after exhibiting it in the grounds of the 1901 Glasgow International Exhibition. Designed by D W Stevenson, and using casts of the figures around his earlier 1878 statue of John Platt in Oldham, the fountain featured in the firm's advertising. Copies were later commissioned and erected in: Town Hall Park, Warrington (destroyed for the war effort, 1942; a model version in silver is in the collection of Warrington Borough Council); and the Sammy Marks fountain in the National Zoological Gardens, Pretoria, South Africa.

In the 1860s, John Kibble designed a conservatory for his home at Coulport on Loch Long. However, after production at the Saracen Foundry, it was shipped up the River Clyde by barge to the Glasgow Botanic Gardens, and fully erected at its current location in 1873 by Boyd of Paisley. The Kibble Palace building structure is of curved wrought iron and glass supported by cast iron beams resting on ornate columns, surmounted on masonry foundations. It was initially used as an exhibition and concert venue, before being used for growing plants from the 1880s. Benjamin Disraeli and William Ewart Gladstone were both installed as rectors of the University of Glasgow in the palace, in 1873 and 1879 respectively - its last use as a public events venue, before becoming wholly used for the cultivation of temperate plants. The main plant group is the collection of Australian tree ferns, some of which have lived here for 120 years. In 2004 a £7 million restoration programme was initiated, which involved the complete dismantling of the Palace, and the removal of the parts to Shafton, South Yorkshire for specialised repair and conservation.

Owing to their earlier tie-ins with the architectural trade, between the two world wars Saracen Foundry produced many cast-iron panels for commercial buildings, including the former Union Bank on St Vincent Street (1924-7); Selfridges in London (1928) and the Art Deco Burton's on Argyle Street (1930). However, the Second World War wreaked havoc on Possilpark in two ways: firstly, by making its industrial works a vast and well-lit target; and secondly when the Minister of Supply and the Ministry of Production made the recovery of iron a key component in increasing war production, removing much of the footprint of Saracen's contribution to the world.

=== Collapse ===
After the war, the combination of the collapse of the British Empire, the move away from steam power and the adaptation of new designs and materials meant a vast decline in orders for Saracen's standard designs. The MacFarlane company moved into standard foundry work, including being one of five foundries casting Sir Giles Gilbert Scott's classic K6 Telephone box for Post Office Telephones.

MacFarlane's was taken over by Allied Founders in 1965, which was itself absorbed by Glynwed Ltd. Possilpark was by this time underinvested and rather decrepit, and so the works closed and the infrastructure demolished in 1967. The site is now occupied by Allied Vehicles and Possilpark Industrial Estate.

== Piece dispersal ==
Owing to the long duration of the factory's life, and the wide distribution of their works, Saracen Foundry pieces can be seen in most parts of the world. Those of note include:

- Glasgow
  - King's Theatre, Glasgow
  - Coats Observatory, Paisley
- Dundee
  - Magdalen Green Bandstand
  - Garden Railings (design No 830, page 231, Illustrated Catalogue of Macfarlane's Castings. 6th Edition, Volume 1 1890s.)
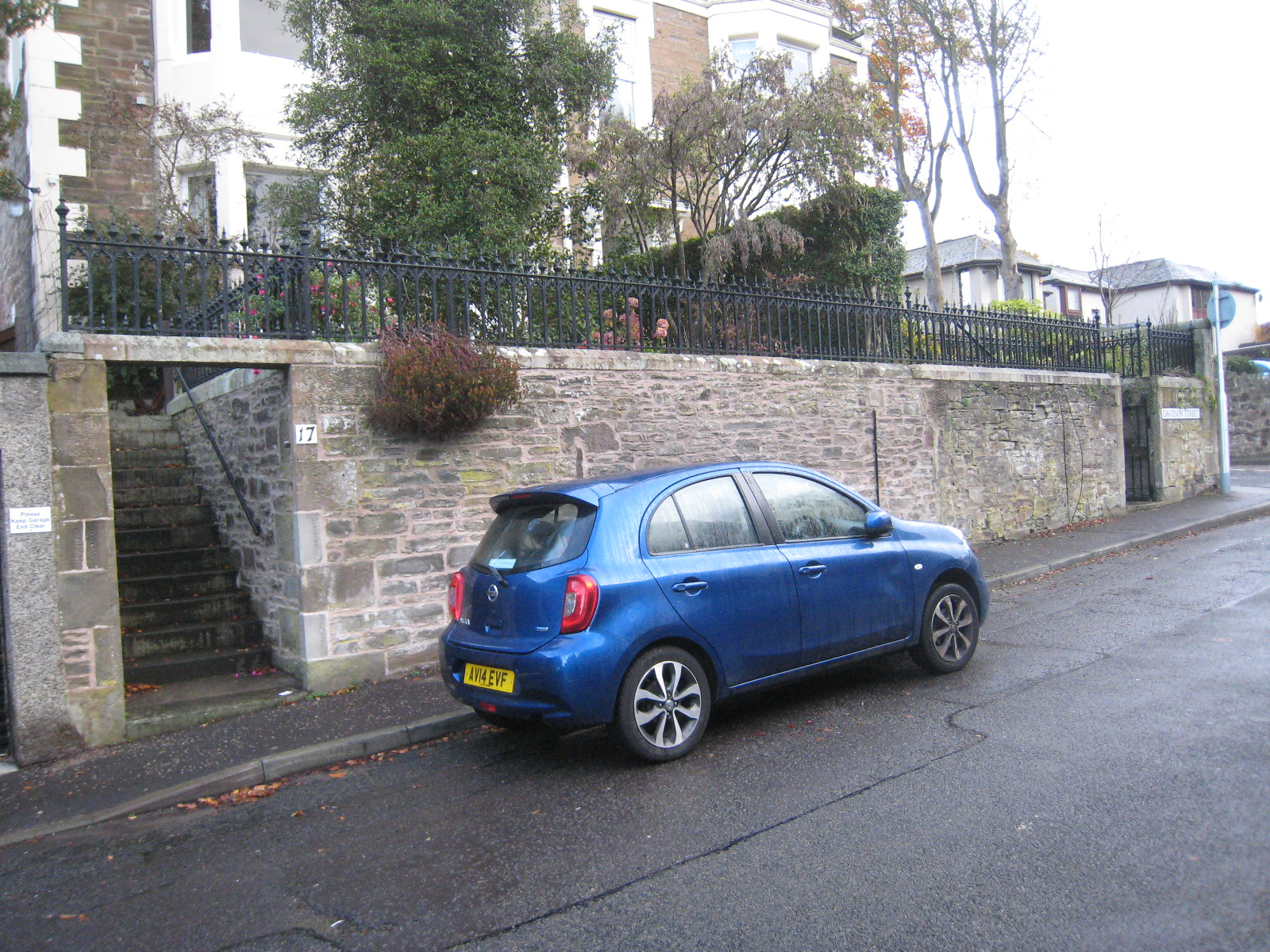
    Macfarlane front-garden railings for a pair of semi-detached Victorian houses
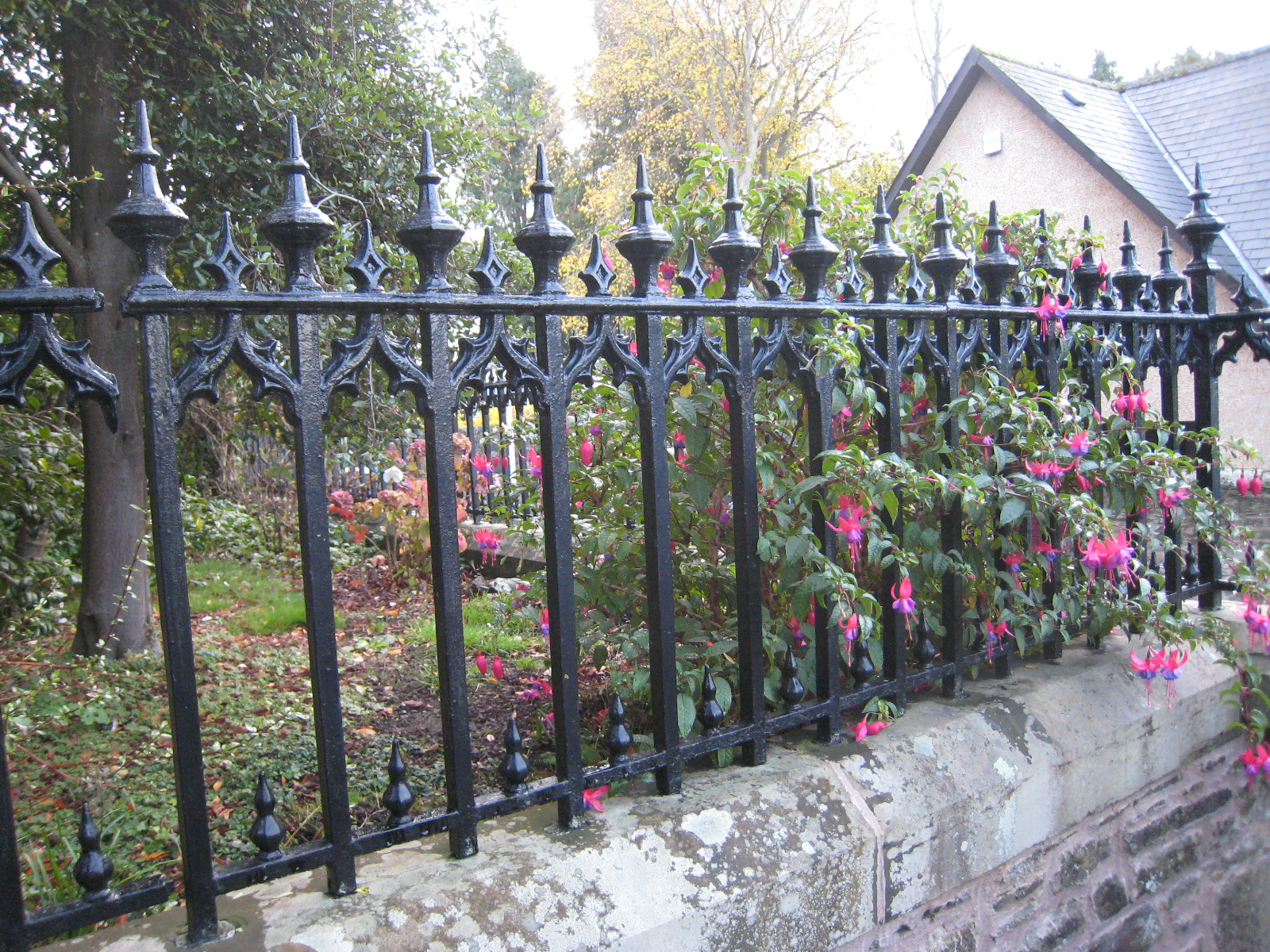
    Section of Macfarlane railings (design No 830)
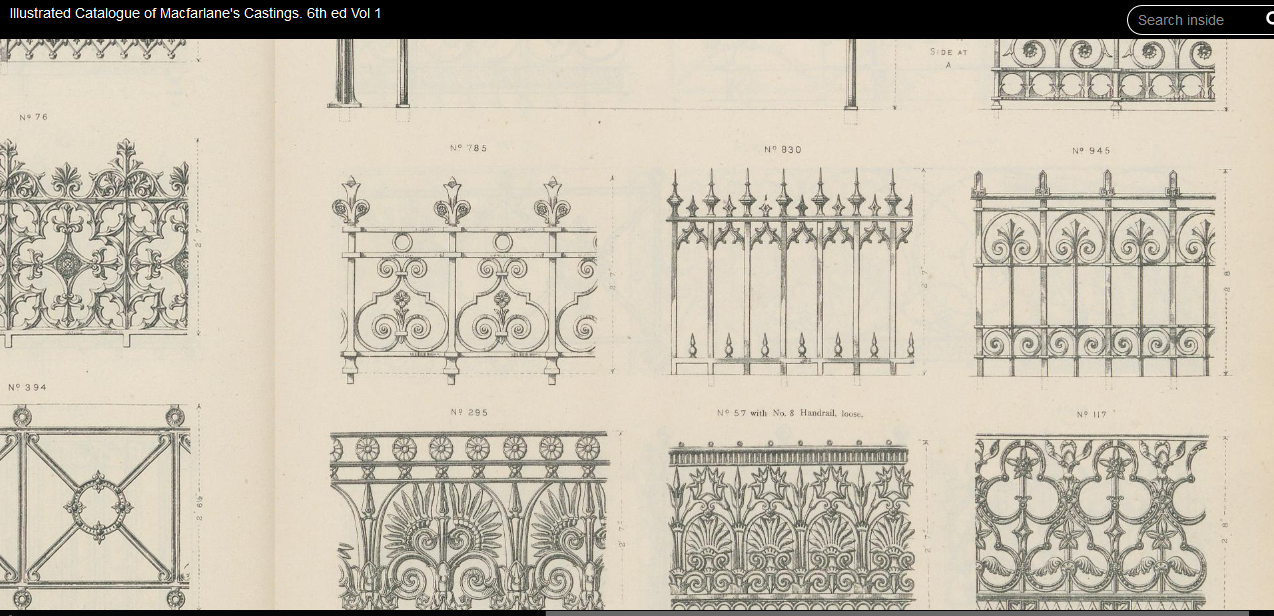
    Railing design No 830 as shown in the Illustrated Catalogue of Macfarlane's Castings published in the 1890s.
- United Kingdom
  - Slough railway station – roof crestings.
  - Wolverhampton East Park – bandstand
  - Dartmouth railway station – roof crestings
  - Minehead railway station, Somerset, England – water fountain.
  - Vivary Park, Taunton, Somerset, England – the main park gates from 1895, and the Queen Victoria Memorial Fountain of 1907.
  - King's Hall, Herne Bay, Kent – ironwork verandah surrounding theatre vestibule, 1904.
  - Oaklands Park, Chelmsford – street light column, originally erected in Plymouth and returned to Chelmsford, where light fittings were made.
  - Royal Victoria Hall, Southborough, Kent – ironwork verandah surrounding theatre, 1900 (now removed) donated by Sir David Lionel Salomons
  - Ward Jackson Park, Hartlepool, England – water fountain – donated to the town in 1902 by Alderman John Rickinson
  - Caversham Public Convenience, Chiltern Open Air Museum - 1906, built to stand next to the Reading Corporation Tramways terminus at Caversham Bridge. Closed 1980 and dismantled in 1985 to be re-erected at the museum.
  - Crystal Palace Park, London, England - Gatepiers to Rockhills, former home of Sir Joseph Paxton c.1855

Some royal coats of arms can be seen in former HM Customs & Excise Offices. The Pembroke Dock Custom House, now Home Home Office Border Force, has a well-maintained example that started life at Custom House Milford Haven. The Fishguard Customs CoA was scrapped by the building maintenance contractor as the mounting was highly corroded.

- Other
  - Lau Pa Sat in Singapore - interior columns.
  - Rondebosch Fountain in Cape Town, South Africa
  - Adelaide, Australia - The Elder Park Rotunda was presented by Thomas Elder in 1881.
  - Williamstown, Victoria, Australia - The Wilkinson Memorial Drinking Fountain (Cnr Syme Street and Nelson Place). Inaugurated on 17 October 1876 by the Bishop of Ballarat, Dr Thornton, in the presence of the Mayor of Williamstown, ministers of all denominations and over 2000 people, the Wilkinson Memorial Drinking Fountain is the earliest known memorial drinking fountain in Melbourne
  - Law Courts, Vancouver, Canada - balustrade of the stairs.
  - Egmore Railway station, Chennai, India - interior iron pillars and trusses
  - Library of Manaus, Brazil - balustrade of the stairs.
  - Theatro José de Alencar, Fortaleza, Brazil - front entrance and internal works.
  - Estação da Luz, São Paulo, Brazil
  - Lauro Sodré Institute (now court of law in the state of Pará), Belém, Brazil - Various iron details. In particular, iron pillars inside the building.
  - India, Bangalore (Bengaluru) Karnataka - Lal Bagh botanical gardens horticultural exhibition building - cast iron and curved glass construction - foundation stone laid by the Prince of Wales in 1889.
  - India, Bangalore ( Bengaluru) Karnataka, Cubbon park Band stand - Band stand pillars.

== Replicas ==
The crestings at Kidderminster Town railway station on the Severn Valley Railway are modern replicas. The patterns for the castings were produced by measurement of broken remnants of those similar ones recovered from Ross-on-Wye railway station shortly after it was demolished. At the request of the structural engineer for Kidderminster Town railway station the replicas were produced in aluminium. These are of a similar pattern to those on parts of Slough Railway station, Dartmouth Railway station and HSBC Bank in Derby.

=== Gallery ===
The Kibble Palace, Glasgow West End

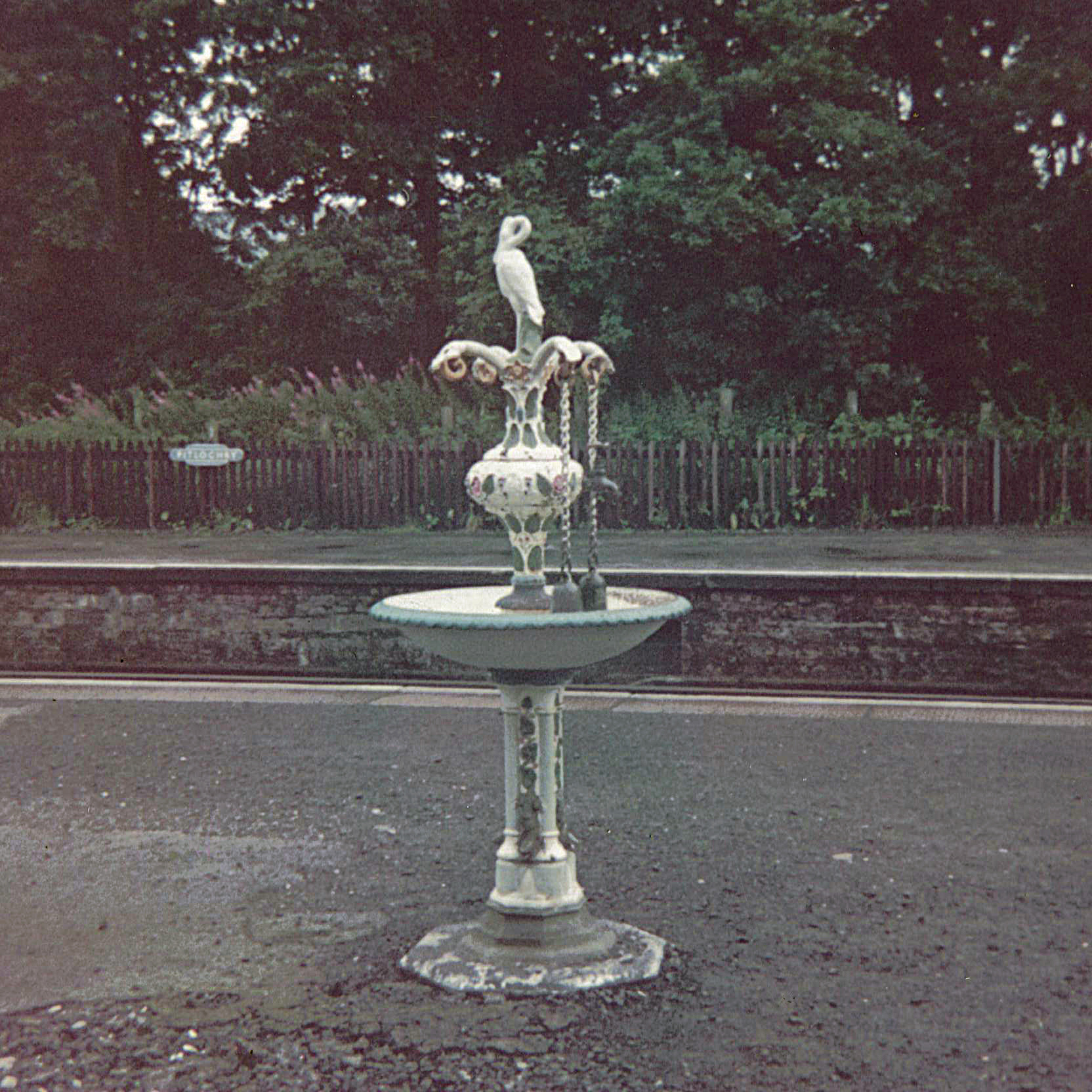
Pitlochry railway station drinking fountain, c 1970

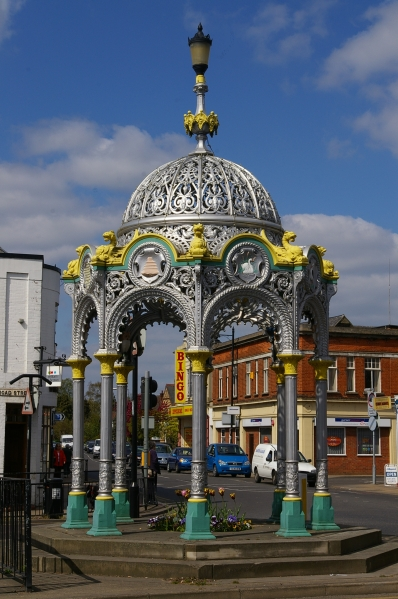
Memorial Fountain in March, Cambridgeshire commemorates the Coronation of King George V in 1911

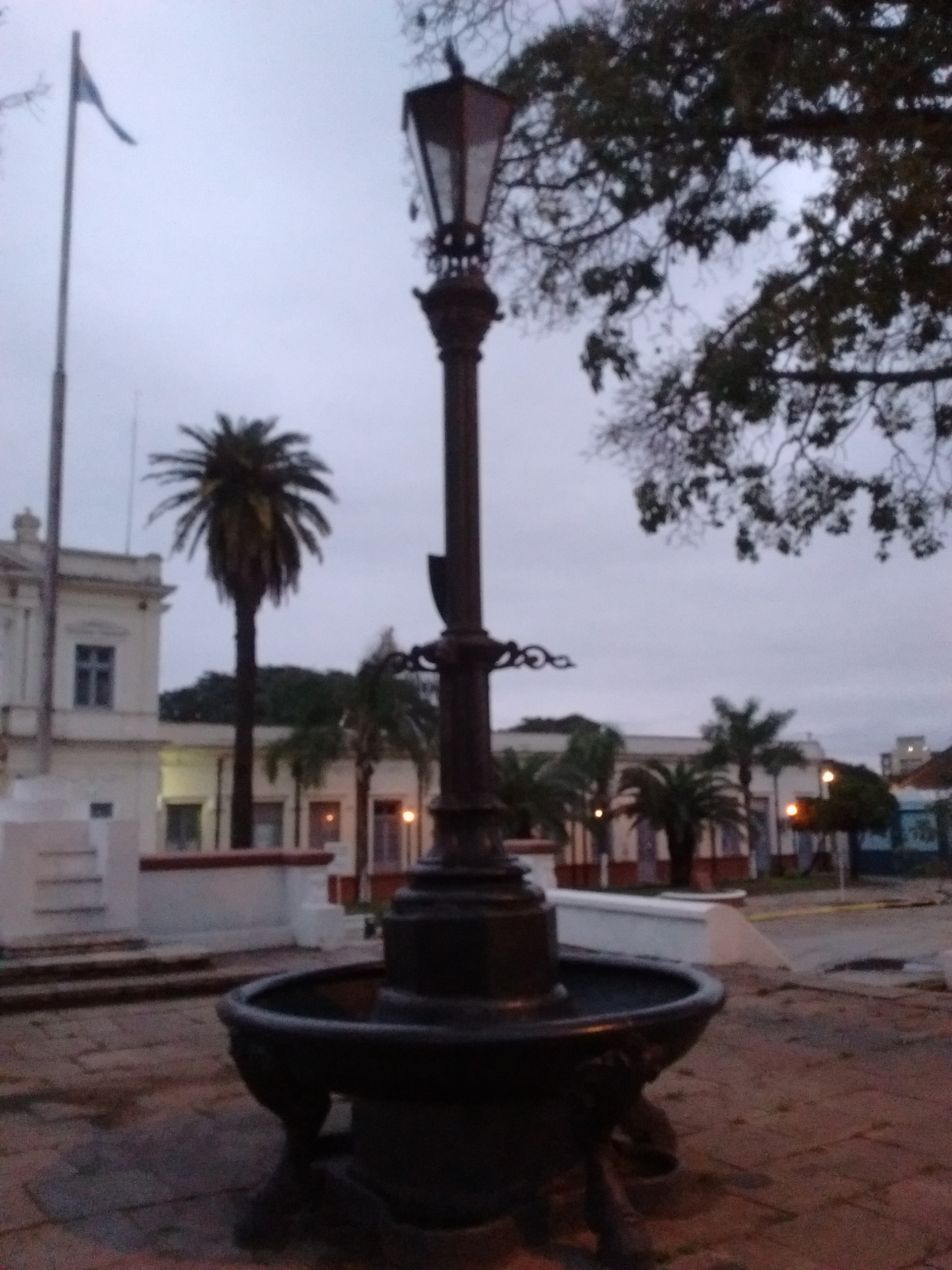
Iron Fountain in Paraná Entre Ríos Argentina donated by British citizens in 1901

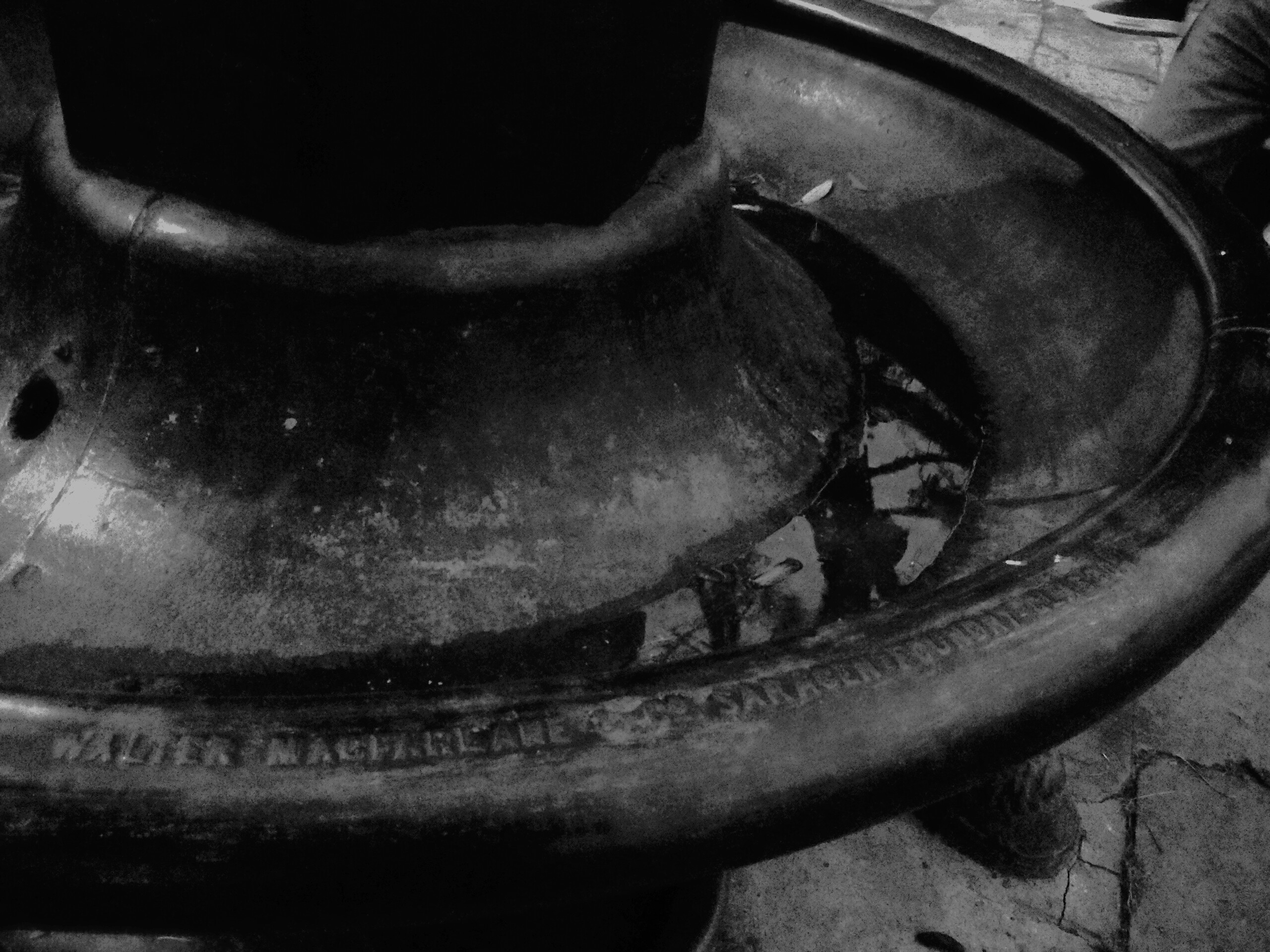
Paraná Fountain Close Up with Inscriptions

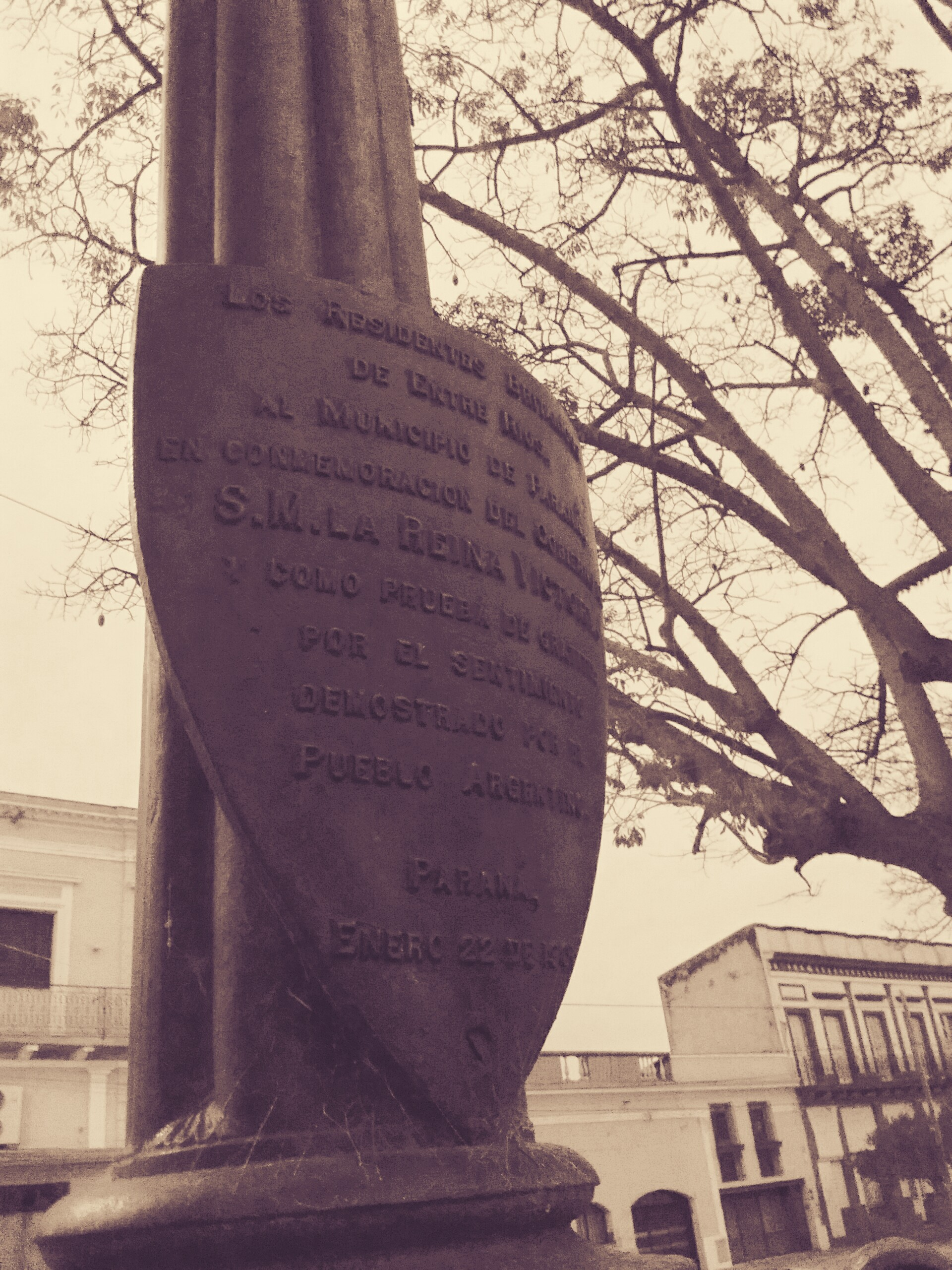
Iron Fountain in Paraná Plaque Close up. The plaque reads "Los residentes britanicos de Entre Rios al Municipio de Parana en conmemoracion del Gobierno de S.M. la reina Victoria como prueba de gratitud por el sentimiento demostrado por el pueblo argentino.- Parana Enero 22 de 1901"

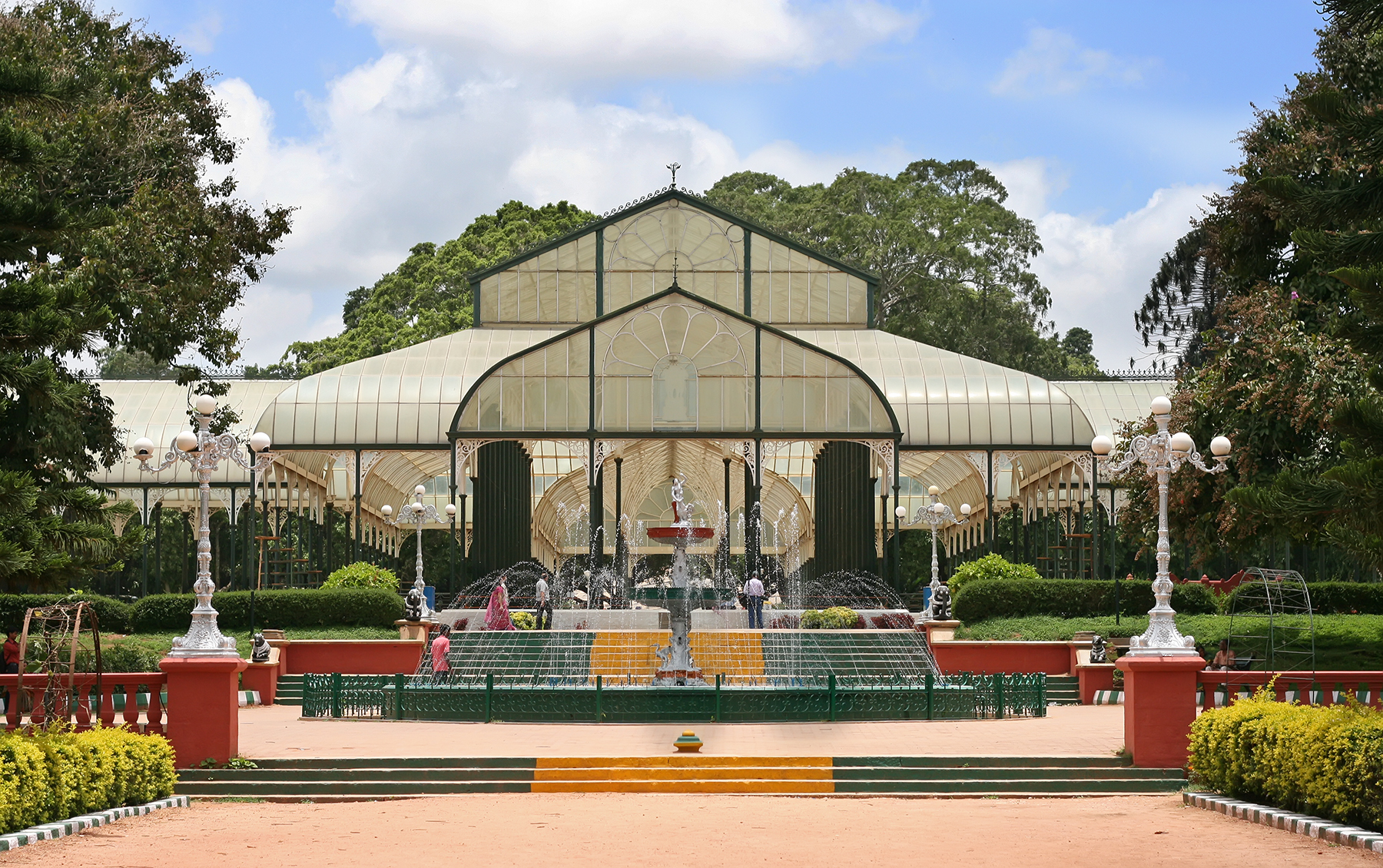
Lalbagh Pavilion Bangalore India 1889

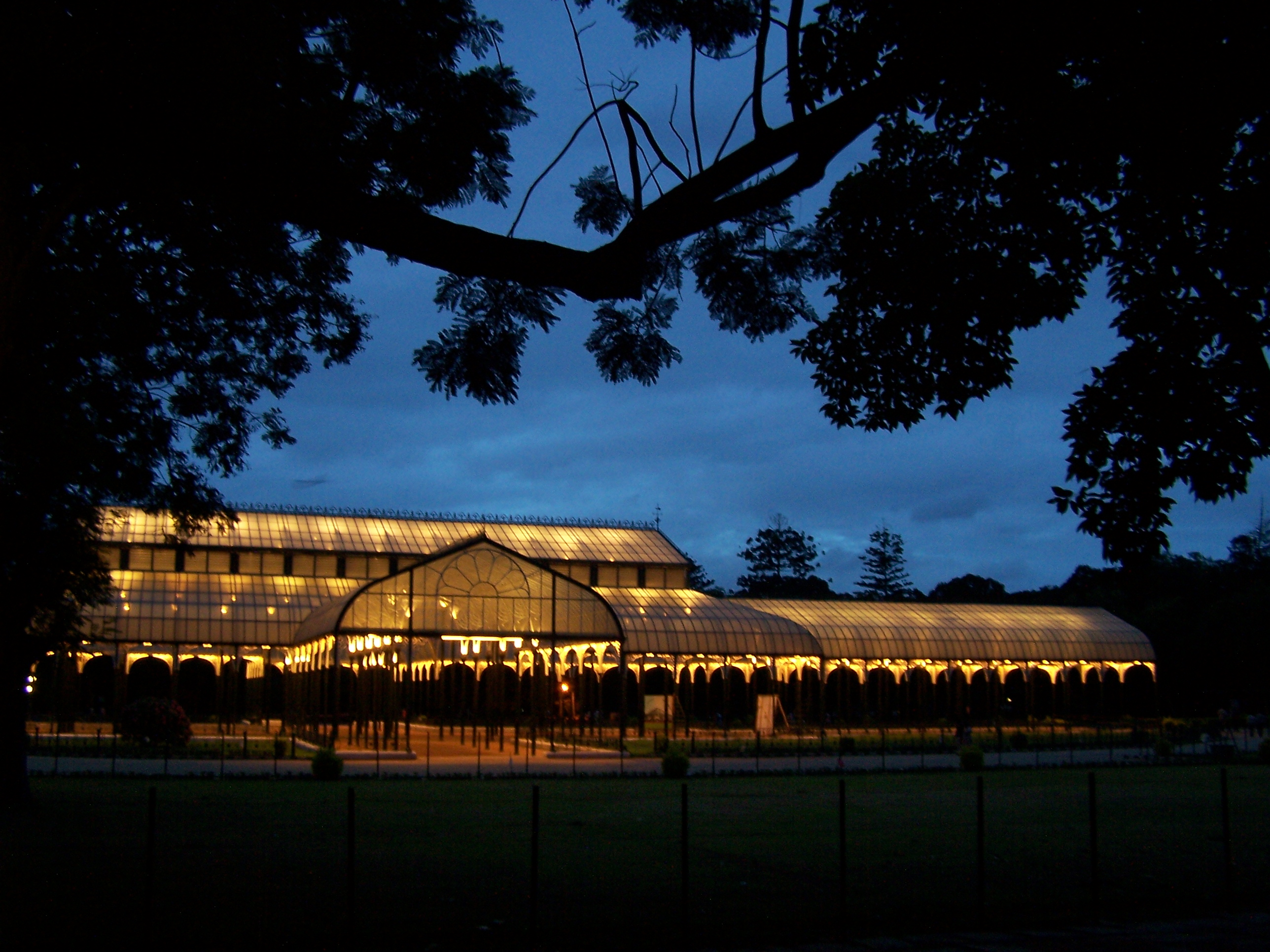
Lalbagh Pavilion at night

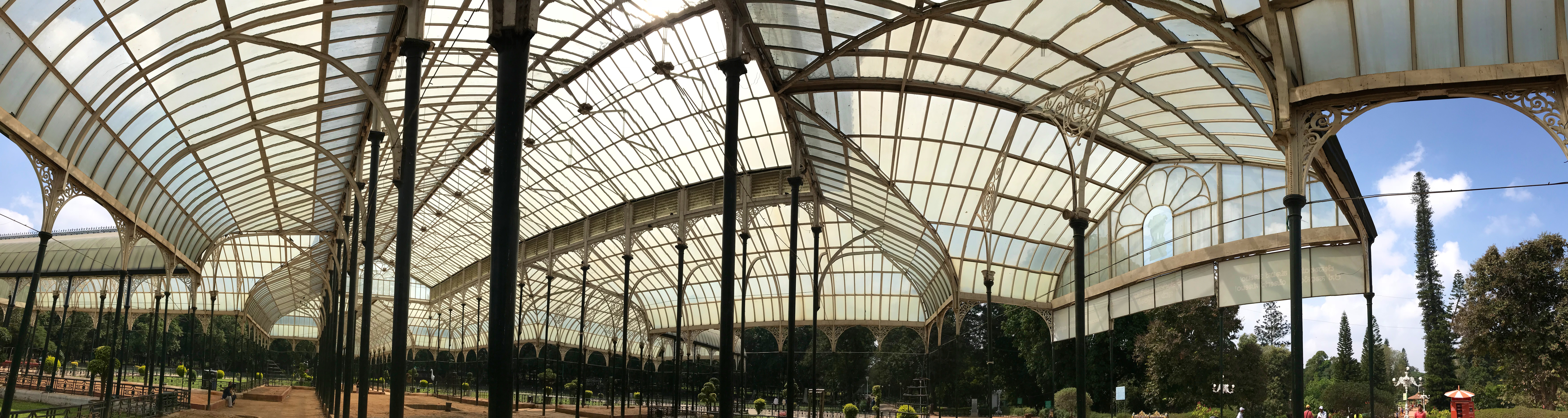
Lalbagh Pavilion internal view

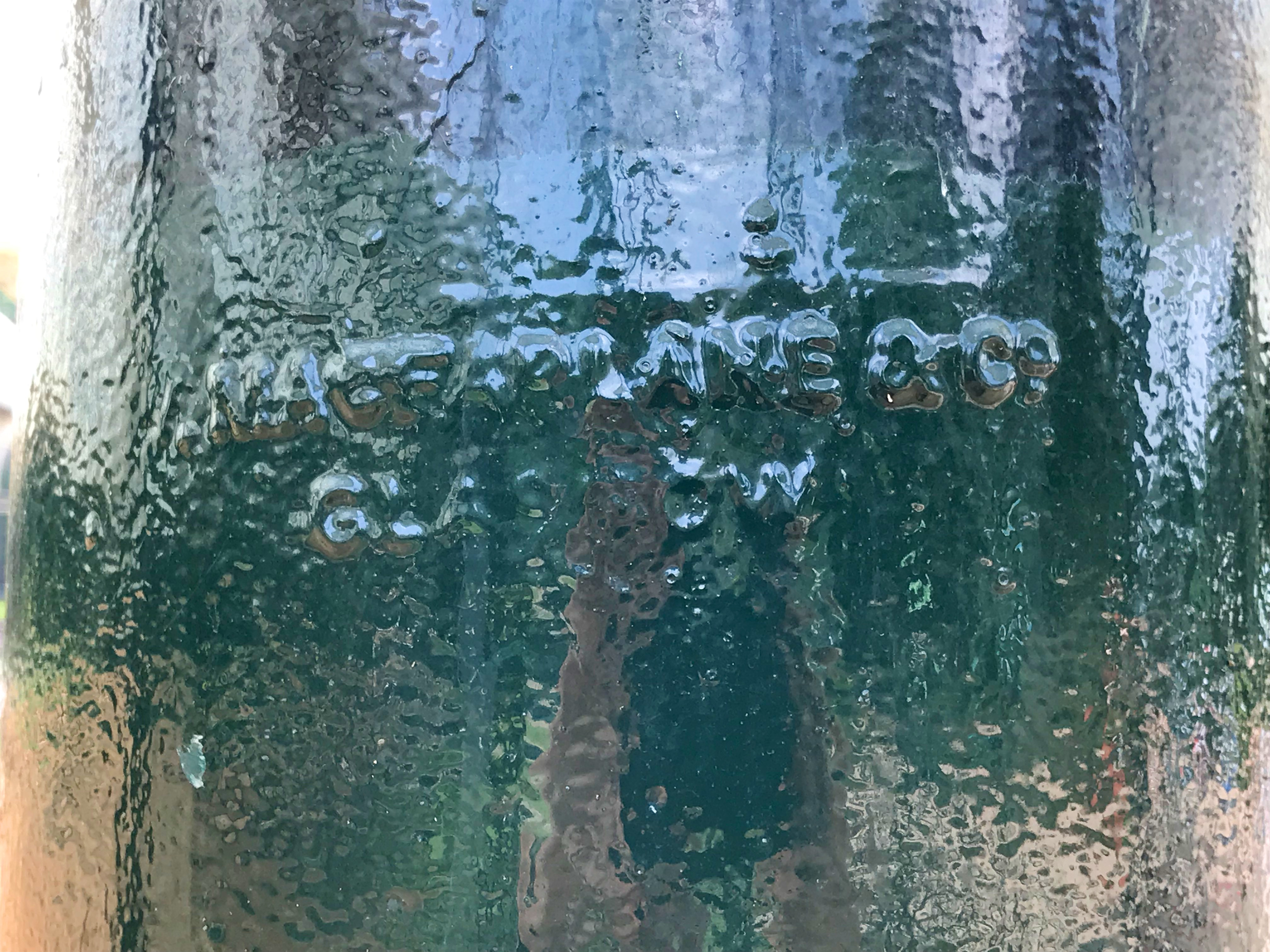
Manufacturer's name on cast-iron upright in Lalbagh Pavilion Bangalore

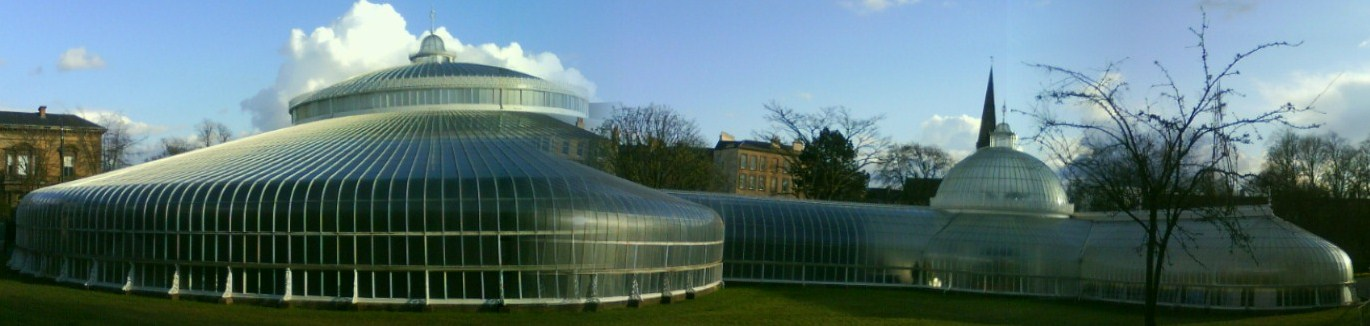
Kibble Palace at the Glasgow Botanic Gardens - rear panoramic view
