= West College Scotland =

College in West Dunbartonshire, Scotland

- Type: College, Further education, Higher Education
- Established: 1 August 2013
- Location: Clydebank, Greenock and Paisley, Scotland
- Colours: Black, Blue, Grey, Orange
- Nickname: WCS
- Website: http://www.westcollegescotland.ac.uk/

West College Scotland (Scottish Gaelic: Colaiste Taobh Siar na h-Alba, Scots: West College Scotland) is a further education and higher education institution in Scotland. It is the largest scale college for Scotland UK and serves the populations of Inverclyde, Renfrewshire and West Dunbartonshire and surrounding areas, as well as overseas students.

== History ==
The college was created on 1 August 2013 from James Watt College in Greenock, Reid Kerr College in Paisley and Clydebank College in Clydebank. The former colleges became the Greenock, Paisley and Clydebank campuses respectively.

The former campuses of the James Watt College in Largs and Kilwinning were transferred to the new Ayrshire College at the time of the merger.

== College campuses ==
- Clydebank Campus is located in Clydebank, West Dunbartonshire.
- Greenock Campus (which includes both Finnart Street and Waterfront campuses) is located in Greenock, Inverclyde.
- Paisley Campus is located in Paisley, Renfrewshire.

== Curriculum ==
The college curriculum offers courses from across a range of levels included in the Scottish Credit and Qualifications Framework, including Highers, NC, HNC and HND. Most courses are available on a full-time, day basis; however, some are part-time or evening, and distance learning courses are also available.

== Principal ==
West College Scotland appointed Liz Connolly as their principal and chief executive on 3 September 2018. She had been the college's vice-principal corporate development since its formation in 2013. The very first principal and chief executive of West College Scotland was Audrey Cumberford, who was also the principal of the former Reid Kerr College.
