= Port Glasgow Upper railway station =

Closed railway station in Inverclyde, Scotland

Port Glasgow Upper
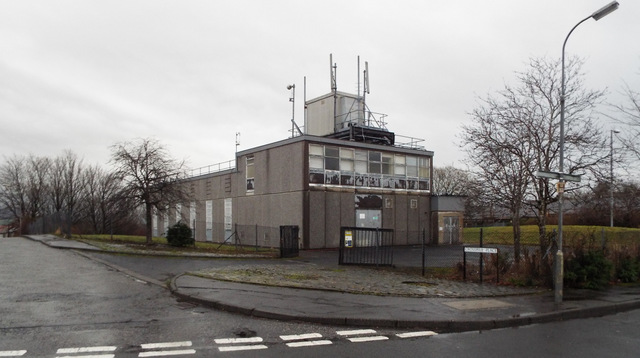
- A telephone exchange now stands on the site

General information
- Location: Port Glasgow, Inverclyde; Scotland
- Coordinates: 55.9239°N 4.6643°W
- Platforms: 2

Other information
- Status: Disused

History
- Original company: Greenock and Ayrshire Railway
- Pre-grouping: Glasgow and South Western Railway
- Post-grouping: LMS

Key dates
- 23 December 1869: Opened
- 2 February 1959: Closed.
Location

Port Glasgow Upper was a railway station serving Port Glasgow, Renfrewshire, Scotland, originally as part of the Greenock and Ayrshire Railway.

== History ==
The station was opened on 23 December 1869. On 2 February 1959, stopping passenger services from Glasgow and Paisley ceased running beyond Kilmacolm; however, the St Enoch boat trains continued running, without stopping, until 30 November 1965.

| Preceding station | Historical railways | Following station |
|---|---|---|
| Lynedoch; Line and station closed | Glasgow and South Western Railway; Greenock and Ayrshire Railway | Kilmacolm; Line and station closed |

== Later use of the site ==
Port Glasgow Harelaw telephone exchange, a children's home and a care home for elderly people now stand on the site.
