= Reid Kerr College =

Reid Kerr College was a further education college in Paisley, Renfrewshire. According to its website, it was one of the fastest growing further education institutions in Scotland with over 20,000 students, 650 staff and 300 courses. Reid Kerr offered a range of courses in a variety of areas including business & management, construction, computing & e-commerce, engineering, hospitality, hairdressing & beauty, science, sport, health & care, creative arts, languages, communication and support for learning. Courses were available on a full-time, part-time, day or evening basis or by distance learning and covered a range of levels from Highers, NC, HNC and HND to professional qualifications. The College also provided training and staff development customised to meet business and commercial needs and assists in the development and growth of businesses.

The college student association was a member of the National Union of Students and was there to support the students and ensure that they had a voice. It was administered by two elected paid students, a President and Vice President, along with the elected Executive Committee to represent students on all levels.

The last President was Michelle McCrorie and last Vice President was John Black.

Reid Kerr College is now the Paisley Campus of West College Scotland.

== Merger ==
On 28 June 2012, the Board of Management along with the boards of Clydebank College and James Watt College gave their support to a merger and the creation of a new college for the West Region of Scotland. The Principal and Chief Executive of the new college is Audrey Cumberford.

On 1 August 2013, merger was achieved. Reid Kerr College is now the Paisley Campus of West College Scotland.

The first Student President of the new college campus is Michelle McCorie.

== Notable former students ==
- Daniel Portman, actor (Game of Thrones, Vigil)

== See also ==
- Continuing Education
- Adult education
