= National Watersports Centre =

National Watersports Centre may refer to:

- Holme Pierrepont National Watersports Centre, in England
- National Centre Glenmore Lodge, operated by Sportscotland, in Glenmore Forest Park near Aviemore, Scotland
