= Lynedoch railway station =

Closed railway station in Inverclyde, Scotland

Greenock Lynedoch
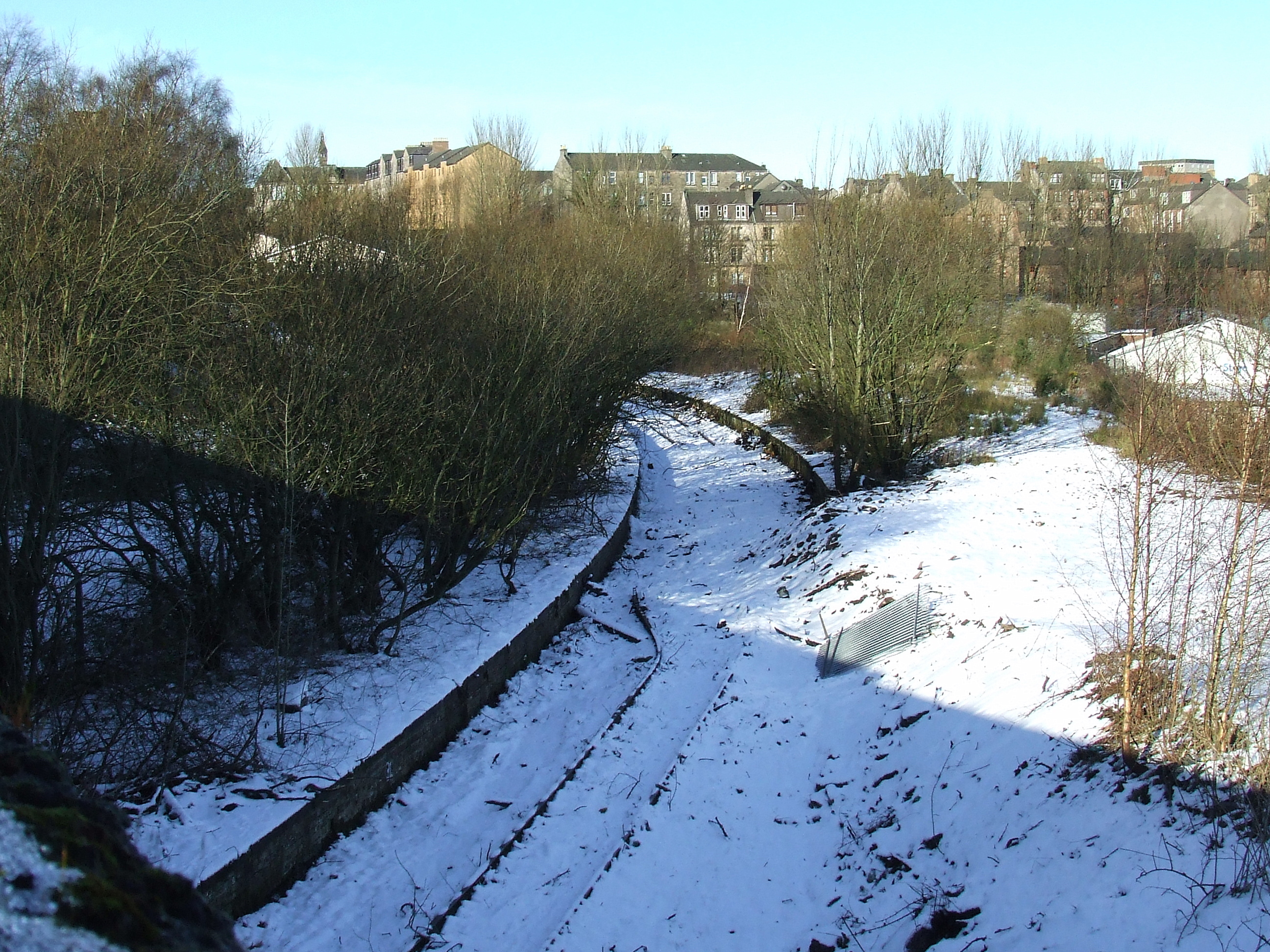
- The former Greenock Lynedoch station in 2009.

General information
- Location: Greenock, Inverclyde; Scotland
- Coordinates: 55.9416°N 4.7545°W
- Grid reference: NS280754
- Platforms: 2

Other information
- Status: Disused

History
- Original company: Greenock and Ayrshire Railway
- Pre-grouping: Glasgow and South Western Railway
- Post-grouping: LMS

Key dates
- 23 December 1869: Opened as Lynedoch
- May 1898: Renamed as Greenock Lynedoch
- 2 February 1959: Closed
Location

Greenock Lynedoch was a railway station serving Greenock, Inverclyde, Scotland, originally as part of the Greenock and Ayrshire Railway.

== History ==
The station opened on 23 December 1869, as Lynedoch being renamed as Greenock Lynedoch in May 1898.

On 2 February 1959, stopping passenger services from Glasgow and Paisley ceased running beyond Kilmacolm; however, the St Enoch boat trains continued running, without stopping until 30 November 1965.

Preceding station	Historical railways	Following station
Greenock Princes Pier; Line and station closed	Glasgow and South Western Railway; Greenock and Ayrshire Railway	Port Glasgow Upper; Line and station closed
Greenock Princes Pier; Line and station closed	Glasgow and South Western Railway; Greenock and Ayrshire Railway	Port Glasgow (Inch Green) (goods); Line and station closed

== Gallery ==
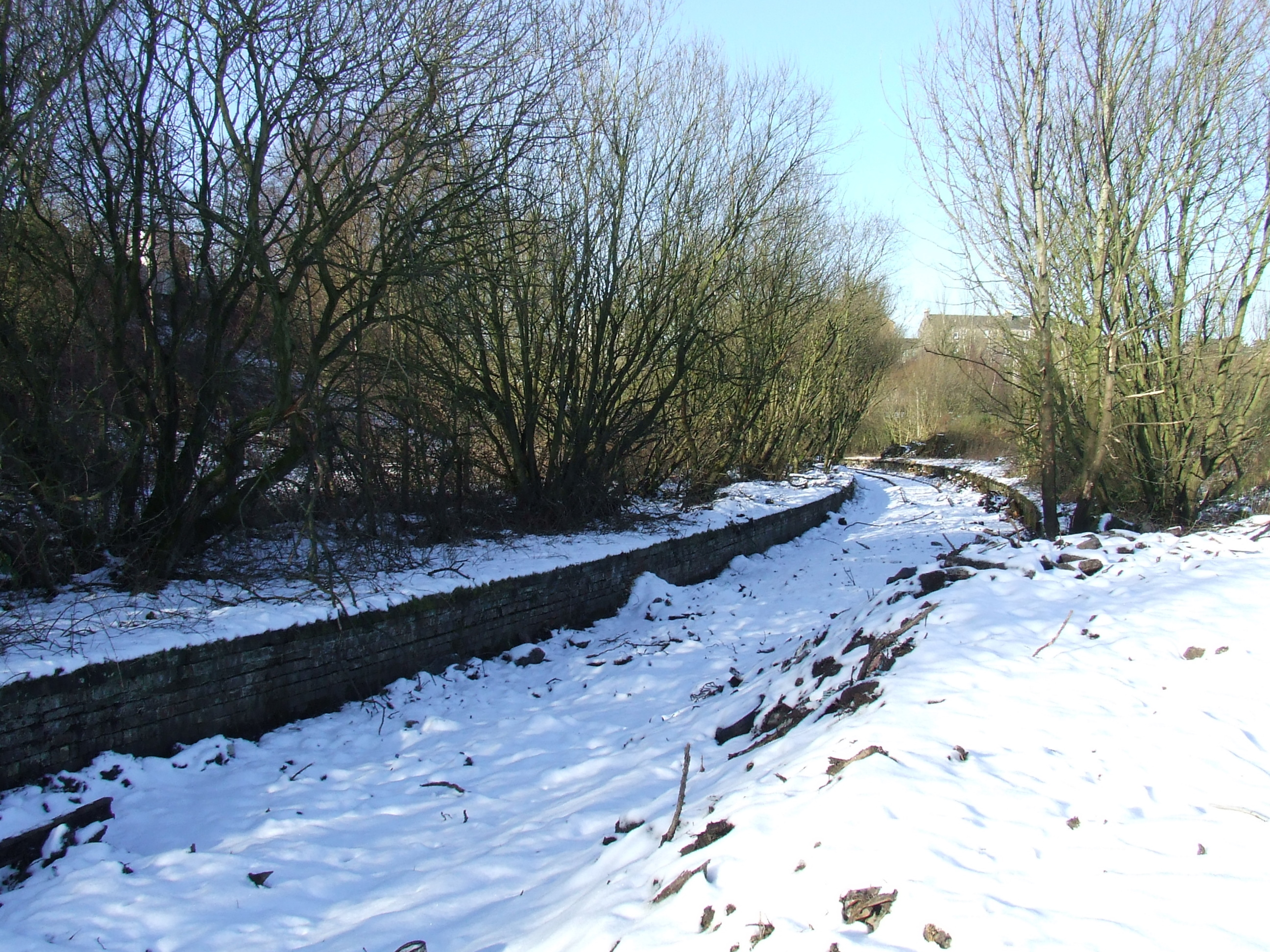
Former Lynedoch station

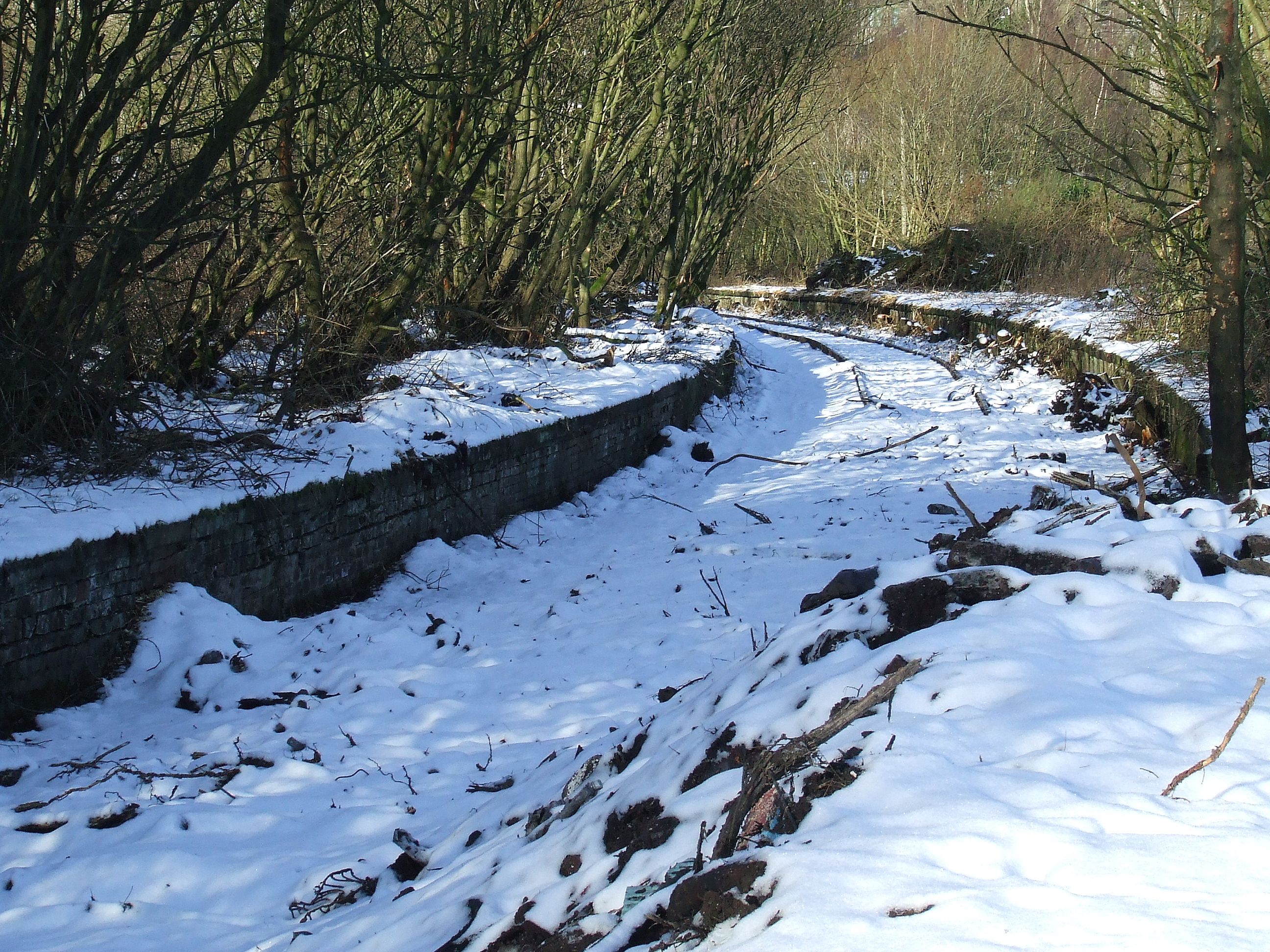
Former Lynedoch station

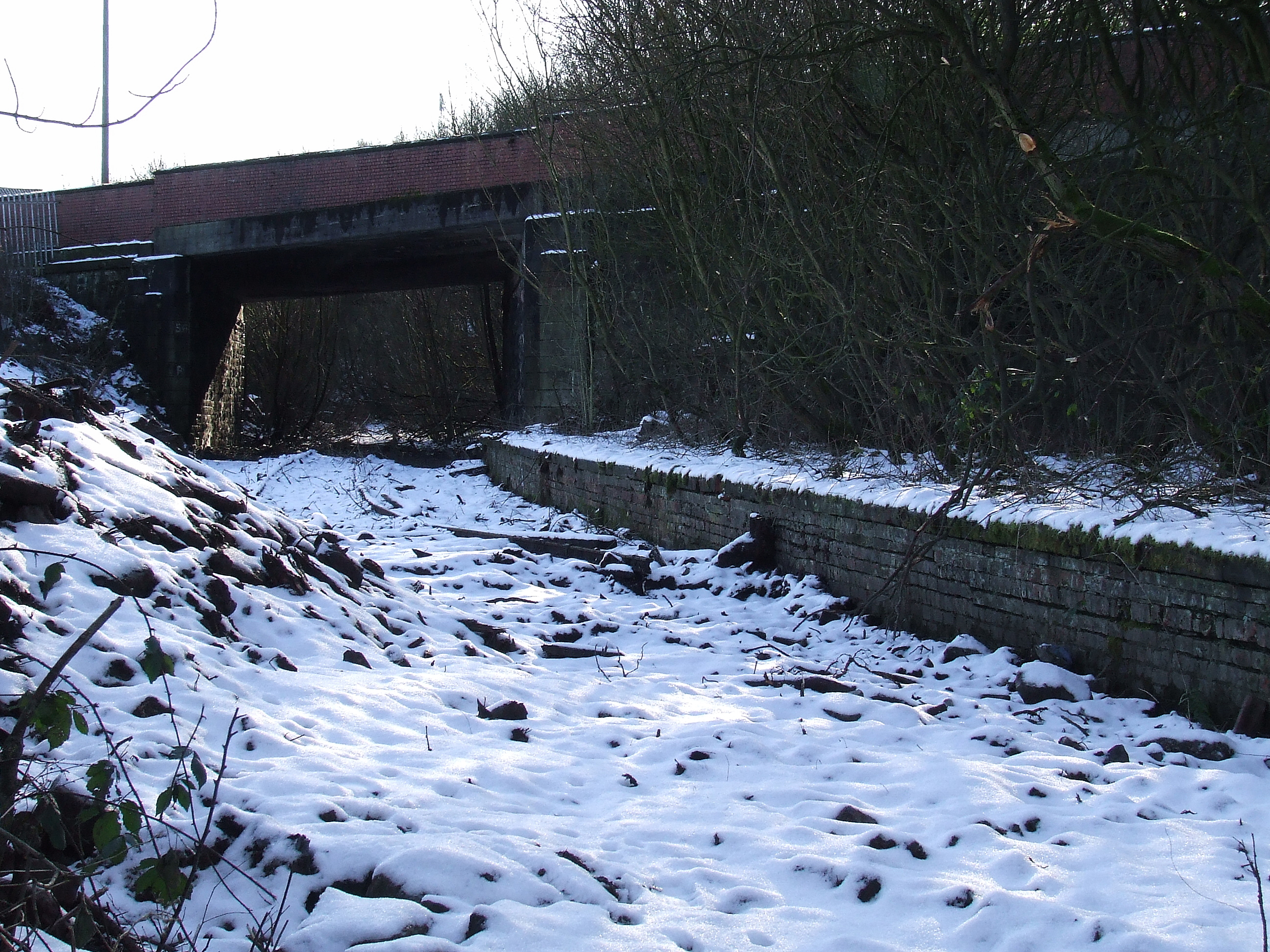
Former Lynedoch station

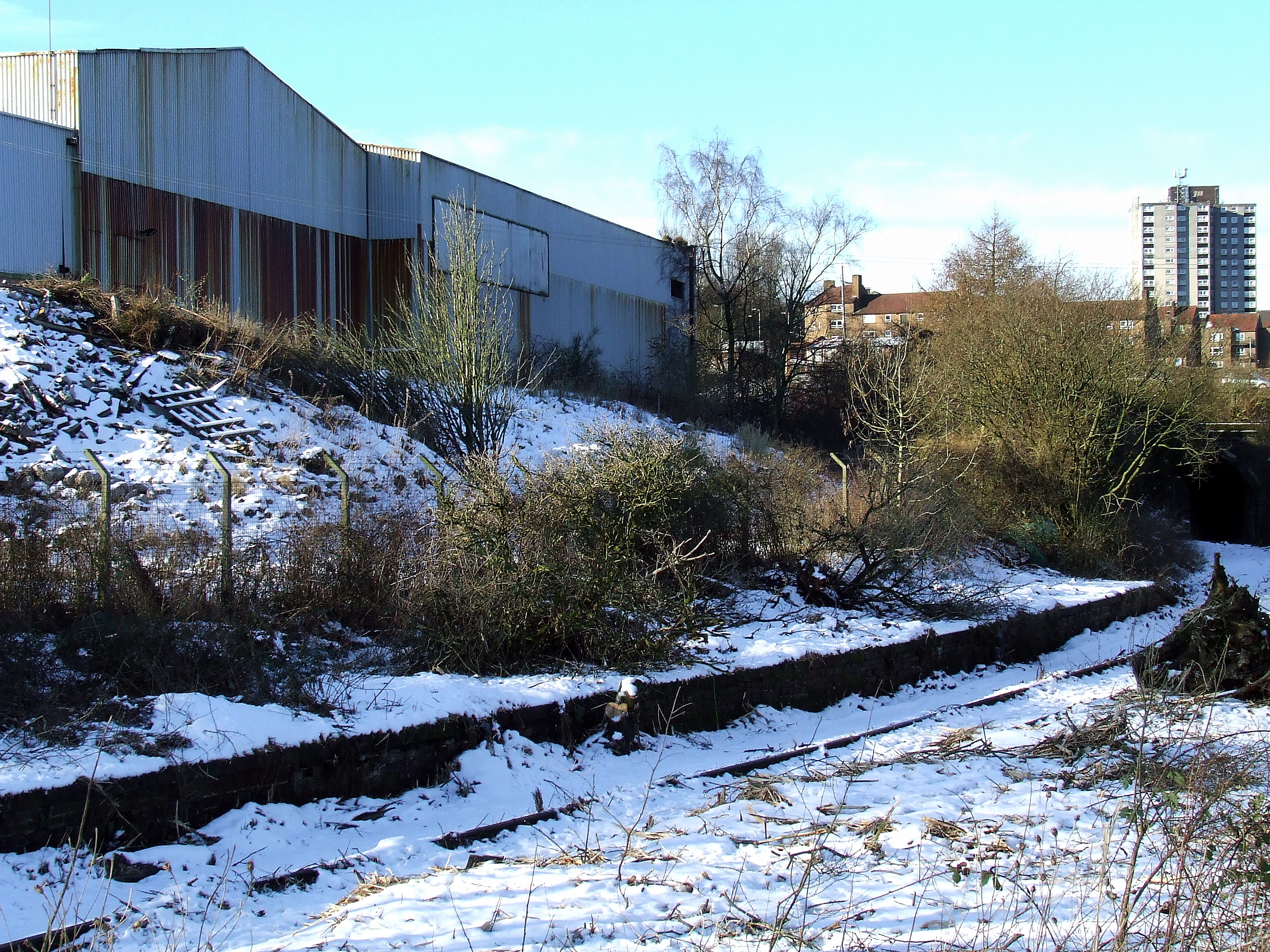
Former Lynedoch station

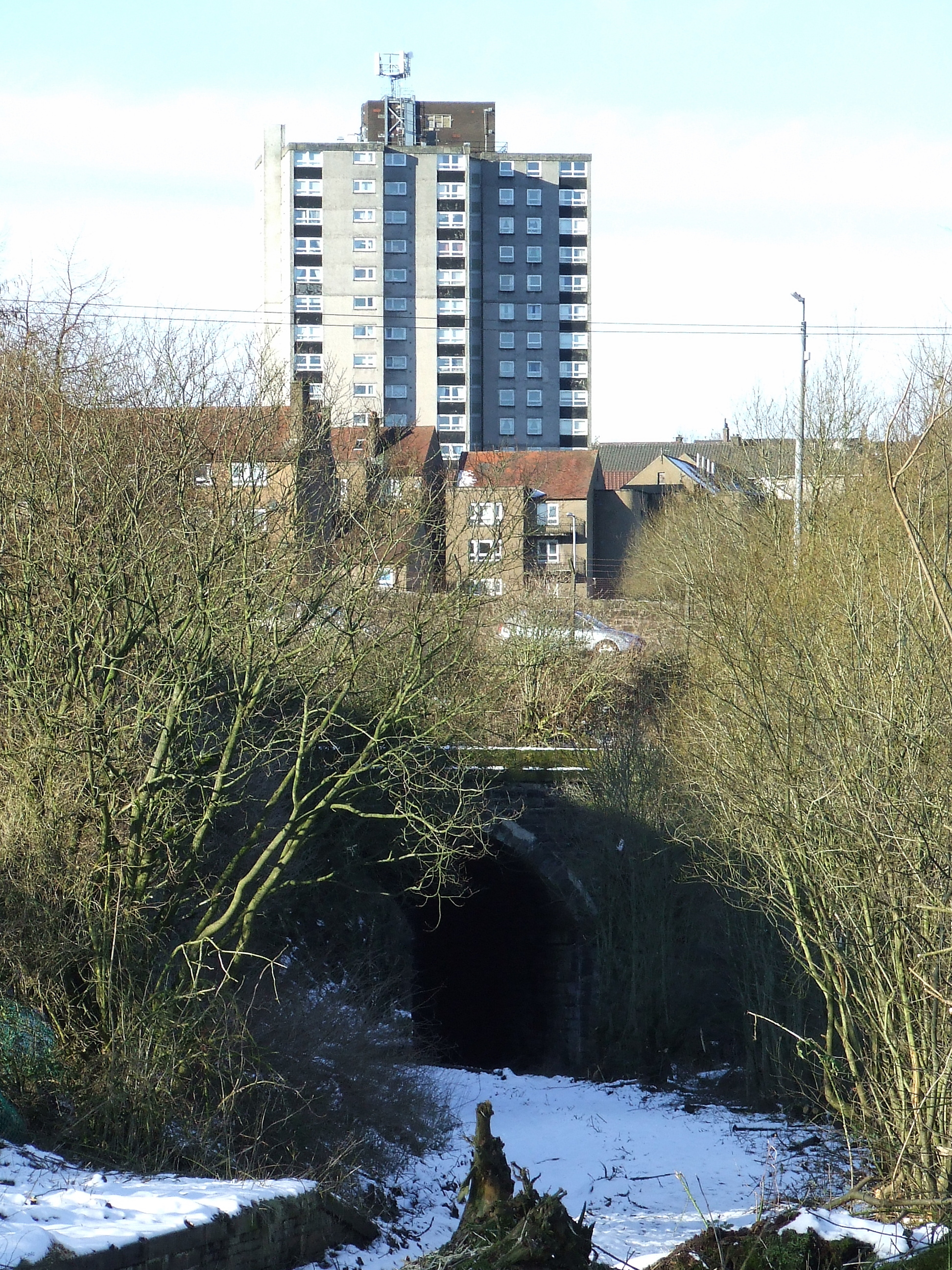
Former Lynedoch station
