= Kilmacolm railway station =

Former railway station in Scotland

Kilmacolm
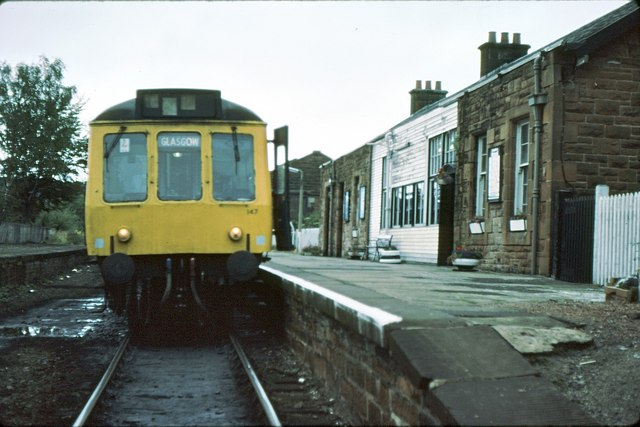
- Kilmacolm station in 1979.

General information
- Location: Kilmacolm, Inverclyde; Scotland
- Coordinates: 55.8931°N 4.6295°W
- Platforms: 2

Other information
- Status: Disused

History
- Original company: Greenock and Ayrshire Railway
- Pre-grouping: Glasgow and South Western Railway
- Post-grouping: LMS

Key dates
- 23 December 1869: Opened as Kilmacolm
- 1 December 1904: Renamed: Kilmacolm G&SW
- 1907: Station largely Rebuilt
- 2 February 1959: Became terminal passenger station of Paisley Canal Line
- 10 January 1983: Closed
Location

Kilmacolm railway station was a railway station serving the village of Kilmacolm, in the current council area of Inverclyde and the historic county of Renfrewshire in the West-Central Lowlands of Scotland. It was originally part of the Greenock and Ayrshire Railway, later a line of the Glasgow and South Western Railway.

The station was opened in 1869. Services west to Greenock were discontinued in 1959 and services to the east and into Glasgow ended in 1983 when the station was closed.

== History ==
The station was opened by the Greenock and Ayrshire Railway Company on 23 December 1869, as Kilmacolm; however, on 1 December 1904, it was renamed Kilmacolm G&SW. The station was largely rebuilt in 1907.

The main traffic was for commuters from this affluent village to Glasgow and Paisley. It was said that the early train was for the "strivers", the second train, which would arrive in time to reach city centre offices by about 9am, for the "thrivers" and the third train – for the company directors, senior stockbrokers etc. – the "drivers".

On 2 February 1959, stopping passenger services from Glasgow and Paisley ceased running beyond Kilmacolm; however, the Glasgow St Enoch to Greenock Prince's Pier Ocean Liner boat trains continued running, without stopping, through the station until 30 November 1965.

=== Closure ===
The station and the rest of the line were closed on 10 January 1983. Discussions around closure had gained pace in the late 1970s with British Rail serving notice in 1980 that the station would close. This led to extensive campaigning against the closure which continued to the end of 1982, involving politicians, community groups and trade unions.

== Current and future use ==
The former site of the station is now occupied by a tavern – originally opened as "The Pullman" tavern in the mid-1990s, it was renamed to "Carriages" in 2019 following a management takeover and refurbishment.

The former railway line serving Kilmacolm station has been converted into a cycle path, and is now part of the Clyde to Forth cycle route (National Cycle Route 75). The route of the line has been preserved, and has been confirmed by SPT to be available for use again should future redevelopment of the line be considered.

== Gallery ==
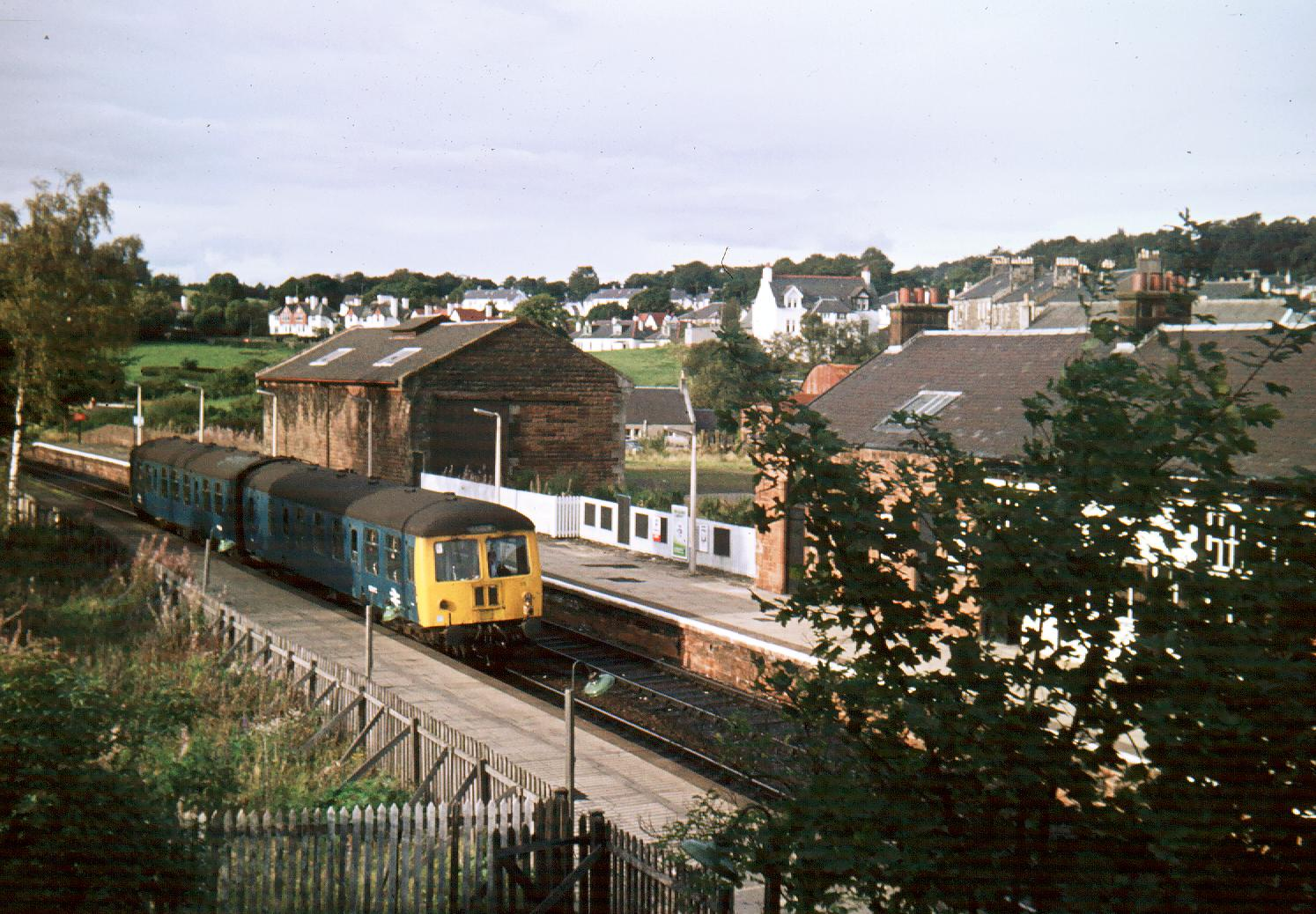
Kilmacolm station in 1973.

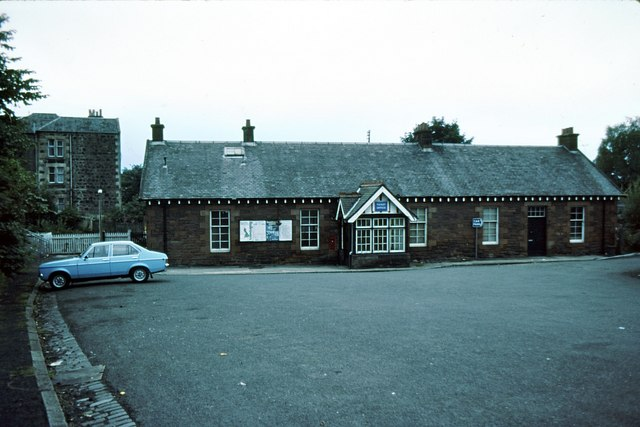
Kilmacolm station building in 1979.

Preceding station	Historical railways	Following station
Port Glasgow Upper; Line and station closed	Glasgow and South Western Railway; Greenock and Ayrshire Railway	Bridge of Weir; Line and station closed
