= Clydebank College =

Further education college in Scotland

Coordinates: 55°53′52″N 04°24′16″W

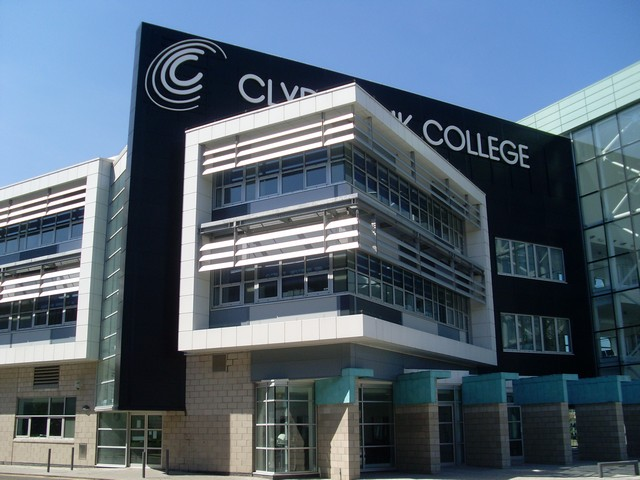
- Type: Further education
- Established: 1965
- Principal: Audrey Cumberford
- Students: circa 10,000
- Location: Clydebank, West Dunbartonshire, Scotland
- Campus: Urban
- Merged into: West College Scotland
- Website: http://www.clydebank.ac.uk/

Clydebank College was a further education college in Clydebank, in West Dunbartonshire, Scotland. It is now part of the merged institution West College Scotland. Subjects offered for full-time study included: Administration and IT; Beauty Therapy; Coaching and Developing Sport; Computing - Technical Support; Early Education and Childcare; ESOL; Hairdressing; Media and Communication in the Creative Industries; Photography; Social Care; Travel and Tourism. There were also part-time courses available in some of these and in related subjects.

The old college buildings at Kilbowie Road have been demolished and a new building was completed in August 2007 on the banks of the River Clyde, at the site of the former John Brown & Company Shipyard and Engineering Works.

The current building is on three floors and is very elongated. The library is at one end of the 'grey mile' and the canteen is at the other.

Clydebank College was part of the regeneration of West Dunbartonshire, with a 6-acre campus on the banks of the River Clyde.

== College Merger ==
Clydebank College merged with James Watt College and Reid Kerr College in August 2013 to form West College Scotland. It is now known as the Clydebank Campus of the merged college.
