= Greenock West railway station =

Railway station in Greenock, Inverclyde, Scotland

Greenock West Scottish Gaelic: Grianaig an Iar
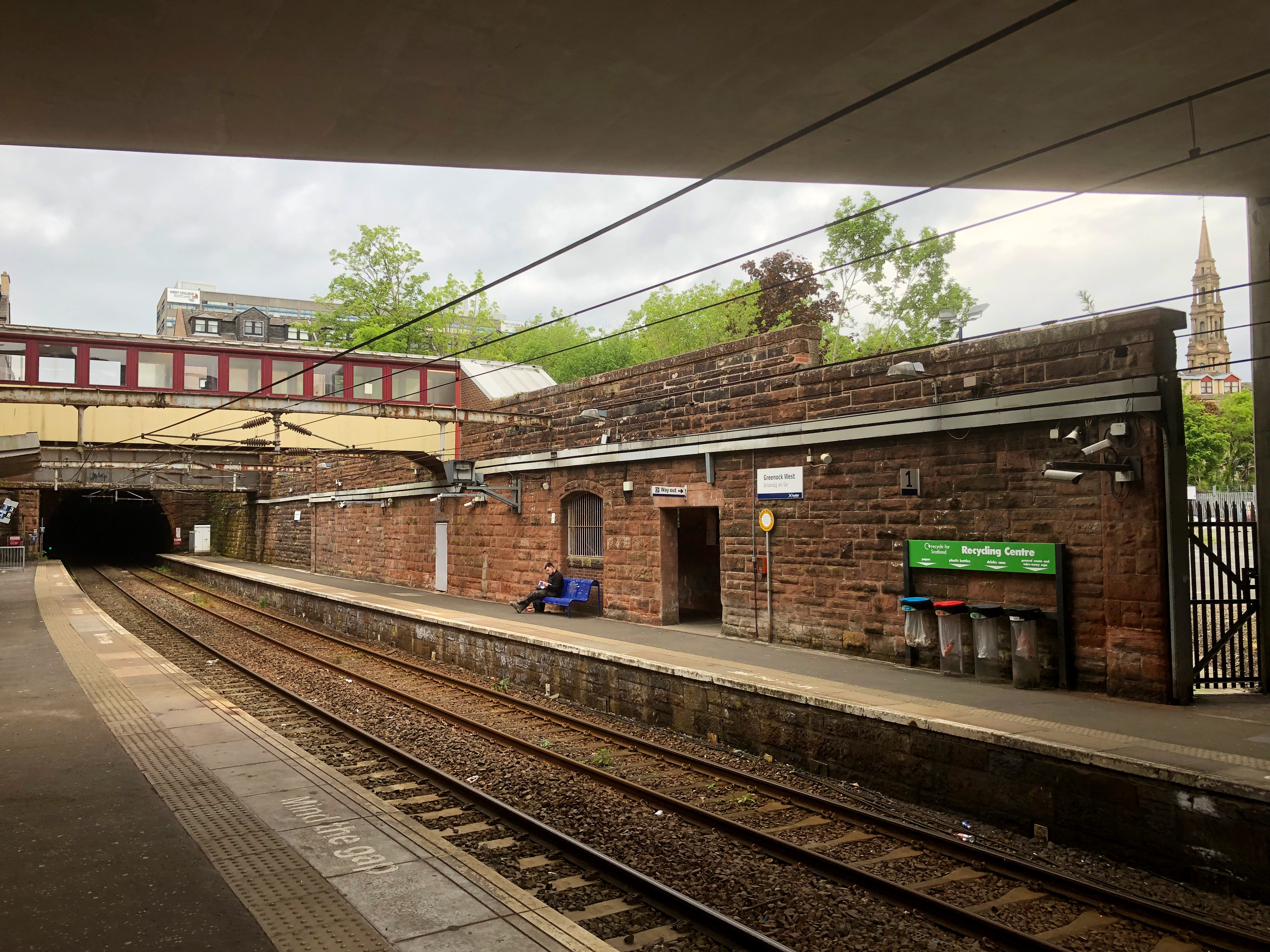
- View west from under Inverkip Street to footbridge, aqueduct and Newton Street tunnel

General information
- Location: Greenock, Inverclyde; Scotland
- Coordinates: 55.9473°N 4.7679°W
- Grid reference: NS272761
- Manager: ScotRail
- Platforms: 2

Other information
- Station code: GKW

Key dates
- 1 June 1889: Opened

Passengers
- 2021/22: ▲0.218 million
- 2022/23: ▲0.268 million
- 2023/24: ▲0.313 million
- 2024/25: ▲0.335 million
- 2025/26: ▲0.343 million
Location
Notes
- Passenger statistics from the Office of Rail and Road

Greenock West railway station is a station in Greenock, Scotland, located on the Inverclyde Line which runs from Gourock to Glasgow Central. The route is currently operated by ScotRail under the auspices of Strathclyde Partnership for Transport. Each service to and from Glasgow on the Inverclyde Line stops at this station.

== History ==
Starting with PS Comet in 1812, Glasgow soon had Clyde steamer services on the River and Firth of Clyde. From 1841 the Caledonian Railway's Glasgow, Paisley and Greenock line offered quicker travel to its Greenock Cathcart Street terminus, about 5 minutes walk from Steamboat Quay (Custom House Quay) by a narrow squalid lane. The 1865 branch line to Wemyss Bay had mixed fortunes, from then the Glasgow and South Western Railway (G&SWR) competed with the Caledonian for parliamentary approvals. In 1869 G&SWR services began to Albert Harbour railway station (at Princes Pier), taking away steamer trade. Rival proposals were made for a line to Gourock, in June 1869 the Caledonian bought the existing Gourock harbour. It later realigned its route to run beside the cemetery to the south of Greenock Royal Infirmary, to a station at the junction between Inverkip Street and Newton Street.

=== Station design ===
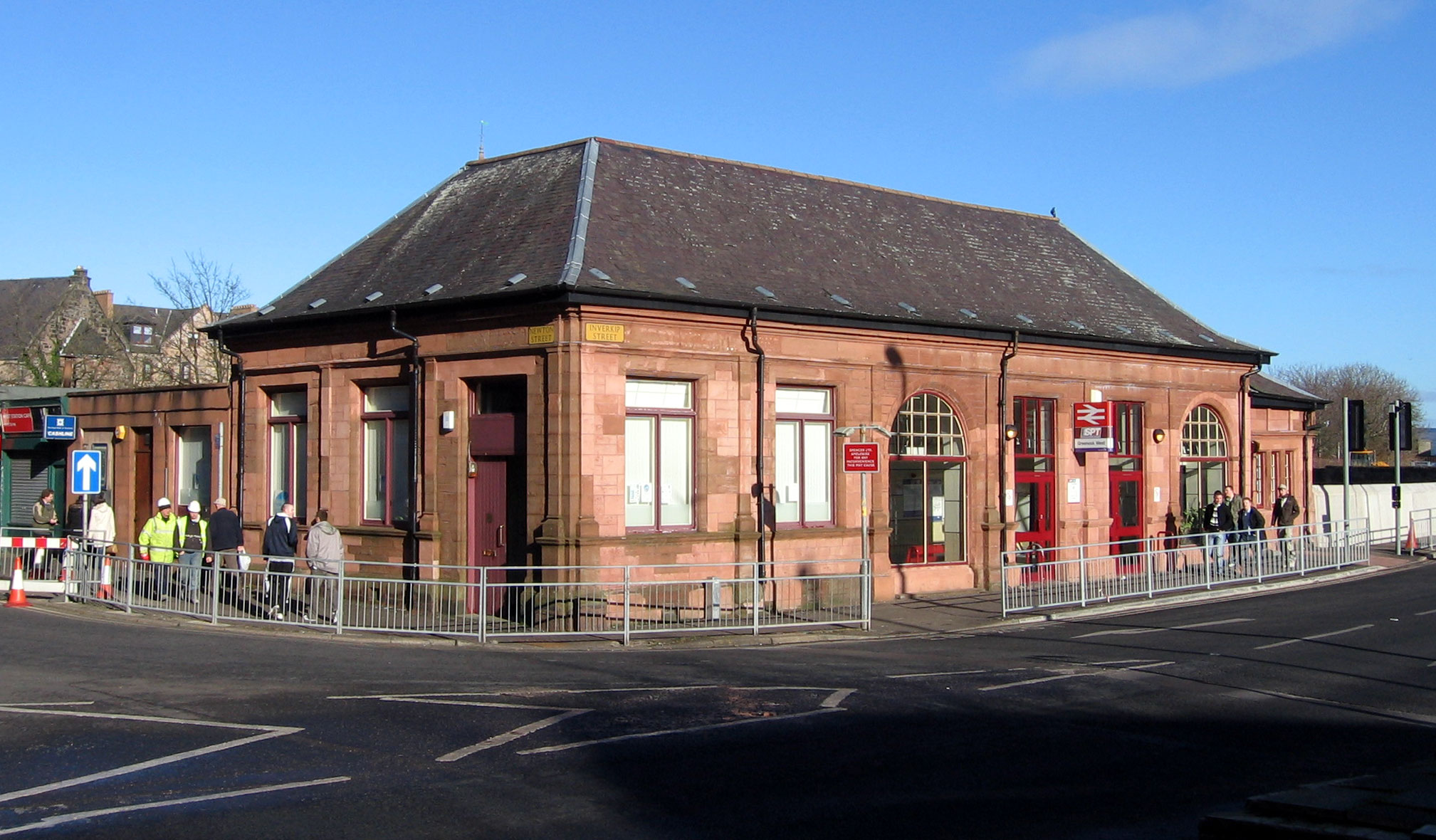
Station building on Inverkip Street, at junction with Newton Street

The Caledonian Railway was granted permission in September 1882 to build the station, featuring "a very neat and substantial stone building in Renaissance style" at street level, with two "large and handsome" doorways from the booking hall onto Inverkip Street. The building also provided a stationmaster's room, a general waiting room and two first class waiting rooms; one for ladies and one for gentlemen.

The line and platforms are about 26 feet (7.9 m) below street level, in a cutting with red sandstone masonry retaining walls. The station building has a staircase down to Platform 2 (westbound), an enclosed footbridge leads across to the stair to Platform 1 (eastbound). The building is on the corner of Newton Street, which at the point it goes across the railway cutting changes direction to align with the grid plan of the west end of Greenock. From this point, the Newton Street tunnel runs directly under the street. About 920 feet (280 m) from the West Station, the tunnel goes under the older G&SWR tunnel taking that railway line down to Princes Pier. Beneath the upper end of Newton Street, where it merges into Lyle Road, the tunnel curves round towards Fort Matilda railway station.

=== Line construction ===
In December 1883 both the G&SWR and the Caledonian Railway promoted competing bills to Parliament for extending their respective railways to Gourock, the Caledonian's proposals were approved on 28 July 1884.

Construction work by the contractor, Hugh Kennedy & Son, Partick, began in 1885. Buildings next to the Cathcart Street station were demolished in 1886. Work began on 11 March 1888 on the 1.2 miles (1.9 km) long tunnel under Newton Street, connecting Greenock West to Drums near Fort Matilda, which employed thirty to forty men on each face, working day and night. The eastern section of the line was reported completed on 3 May 1889, and on 4 May a special train took Caledonian directors over the whole route to show them the progress of the work. The extension officially opened on 1 June 1889, with the first train departing Gourock at 05:25 taking workmen to Greenock and Port Glasgow, driven by the engineer Dugald Drummond who had designed and got built the Caledonian Railway 80 Class "Coast Bogies" for the route. The first arrival at Gourock with passengers from Glasgow at 07:20 met a "warm reception".

=== West Burn aqueduct, sugar refinery siding ===
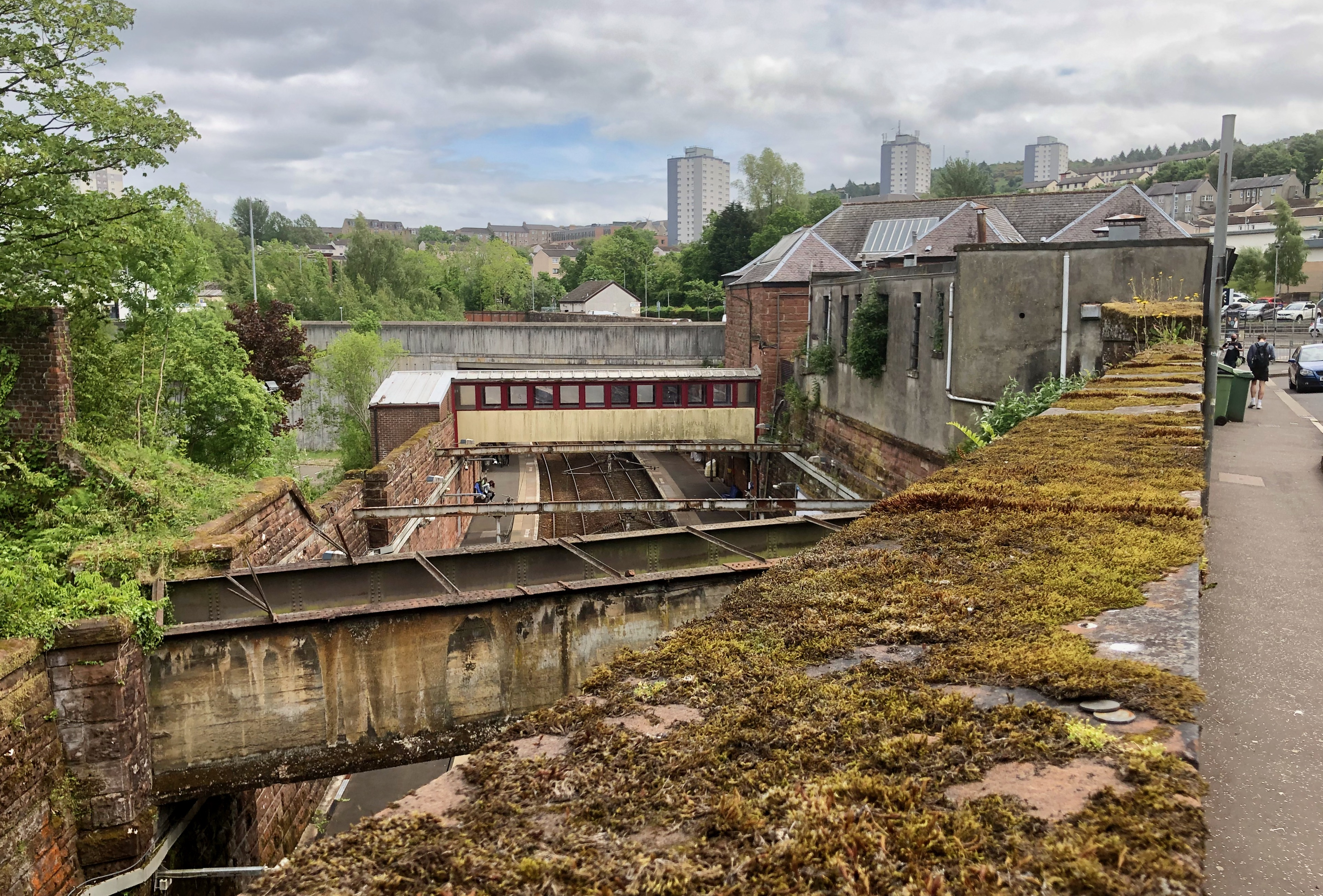
View over Newton Street parapet, aqueduct leading to mill pond on the left, footbridge between station buildings, and concrete bridge over Inverkip Street

The West Burn flows down adjacent to Inverkip Road, and originally powered water mills downstream from the station site, where a sugar refinery originated in 1826, and was expanded by John Walker and Co from 1848. The river was culverted under the G&SWR railway and Inverkip Street, then taken above the West Station platforms and railway line in an open metal trough forming an aqueduct leading to a reservoir or mill pond just to the north of the station.

The railway cutting includes an area to the northeast of the station. A branch line diverged from the westbound track after the Duncan Street bridge and, passing to the north of columns supporting the Bruce Street bridge, curved round into a goods yard with sidings extending to West Shaw Street. A track continued into Walker's refinery.

=== 1912 flooding ===
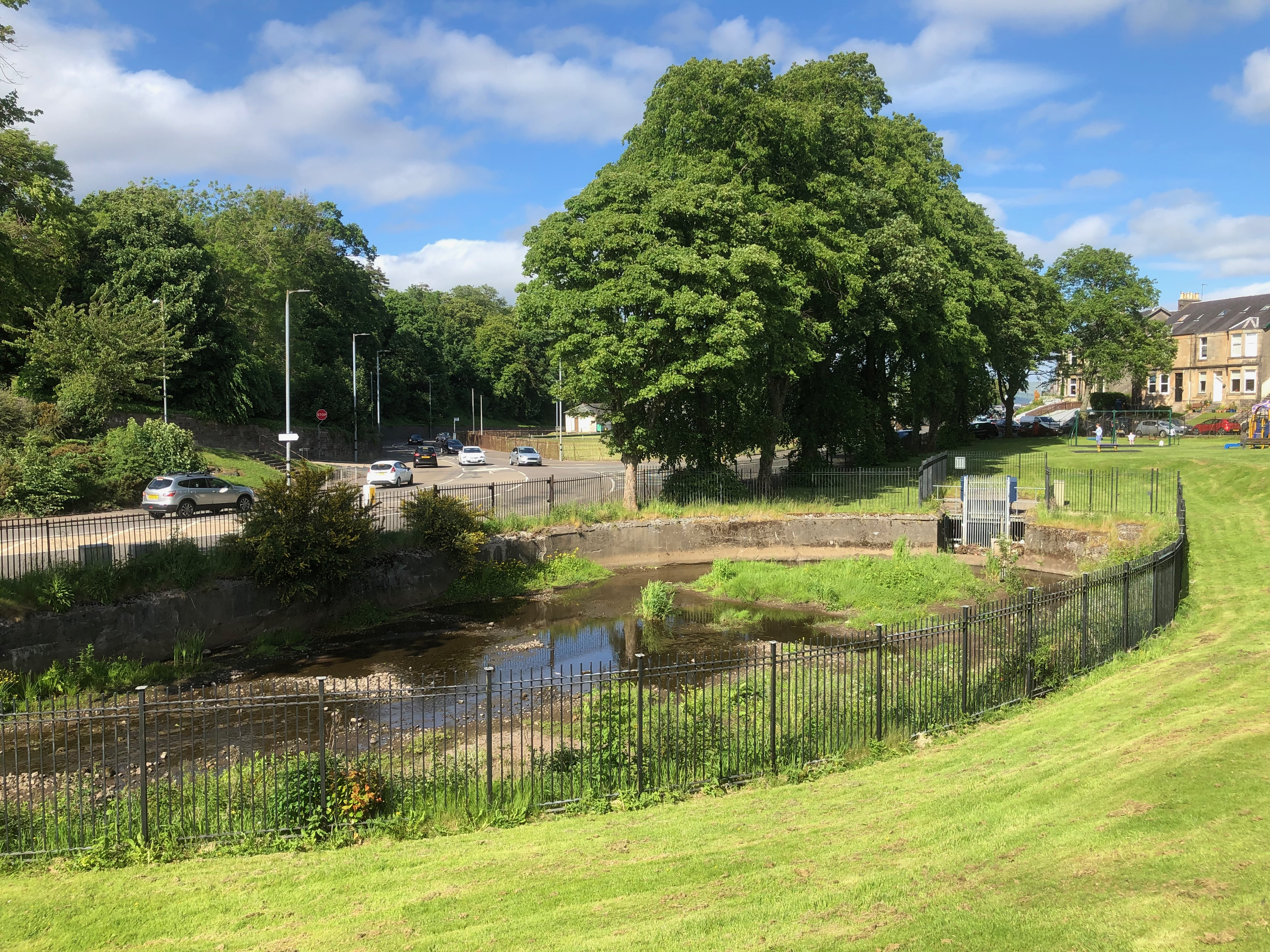
Lady Alice Park – paddling pond at culvert inlet, view towards bowling greens.

Stormy weather followed by torrential rain on 5 August 1912 caused flooding in Greenock. From hills to its south, burns in spate contributed to a torrent down the West Burn and water running down the adjacent Inverkip Road towards Inverkip Street. At Lady Alice Park on the approach to the town, the burgh corporation had put the burn in a culvert for about 400 yards (370 m), with a children's pond at its inlet, and had filled its valley to form a level playing area (bowling greens) higher than the road. Water which would have gone safely down the valley now ran down the road, increasing when the culvert inlet became blocked by debris and the pond overflowed.

Floods built up at the West Station. Water pressure shifted the retaining wall at Platform 2 just east of the Inverkip Street bridge, damaging the westbound line and causing collapse of the gable of an adjacent bookshop with flats on upper floors. Near the foot of Inverkip Road, floodwater found an outlet into the G&SWR tunnel, and rushed down to their sidings above Brougham Street, damaging houses near Princes Pier.

Both railways sued the Corporation of Greenock, in cases which set precedent for law on culverts, and on appeal the House of Lords decided the cases in favour of the railways.

=== Developments ===
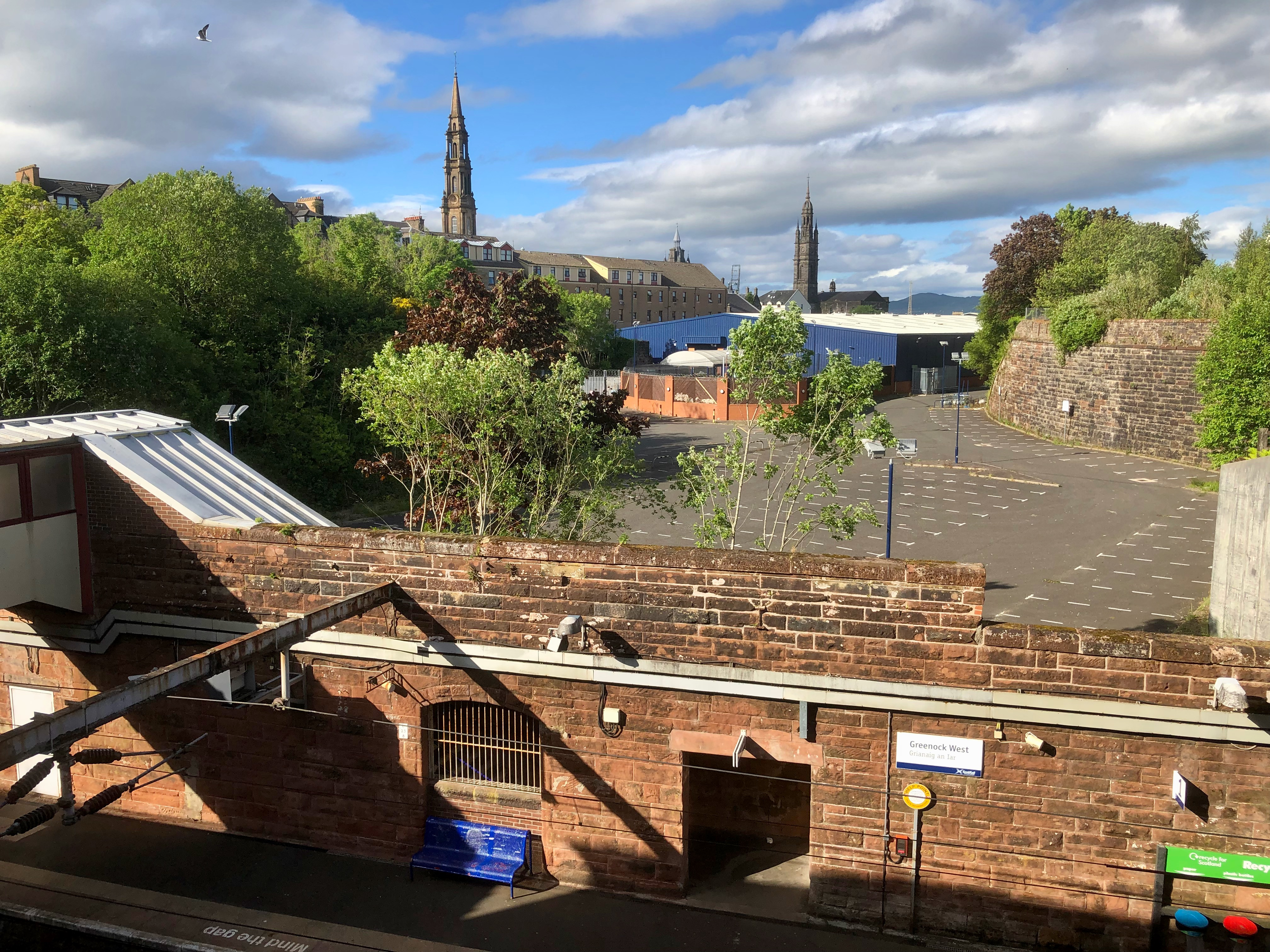
View over platform 1 to overgrown mill pond, and car park at The Range store in former goods yard.

Walker's sugar refinery closed in 1979. The Inverkip Street bridge was of steel girder construction, as the Bruce Street bridge still is, and in a similar way was extended with cast iron column supports to go over the railway sidings. It needed renewal, and in a major project after 2000 it was replaced by a modern concrete bridge and retaining wall which blocks off access to the goods yard area. The site was redeveloped as a Homebase retail outlet and car park. After this business closed, it was replaced in 2020 by The Range retailer, incorporating an Iceland food department.

The mill pond was still intact in the late 1980s, but it became overgrown and its weir has been breached, letting the river flow through. The adjacent church was demolished in 2021.

== Services ==
It is a staffed station with two platforms; the eastbound platform to Glasgow is reached via a footbridge over the tracks. The tracks are located below street level, with a tunnel to the west leading to Fort Matilda, and to the east a cutting then a tunnel takes the line to Greenock Central. The main A78 road bridge which takes Inverkip Street over the station platforms had to be rebuilt and was closed to traffic for several years with a diversion in operation.

The typical off-peak service in trains per hour is:

- 2 tph to Glasgow Central via Paisley Gilmour Street
- 2 tph to Gourock

Additional trains call at the station during peak hours.

Preceding station	National Rail	Following station
Fort Matilda	ScotRail; Inverclyde Line	Greenock Central
	Historical railways	
Fort Matilda	Caledonian Railway; Glasgow, Paisley and Greenock Railway	Greenock Central

== Gallery ==
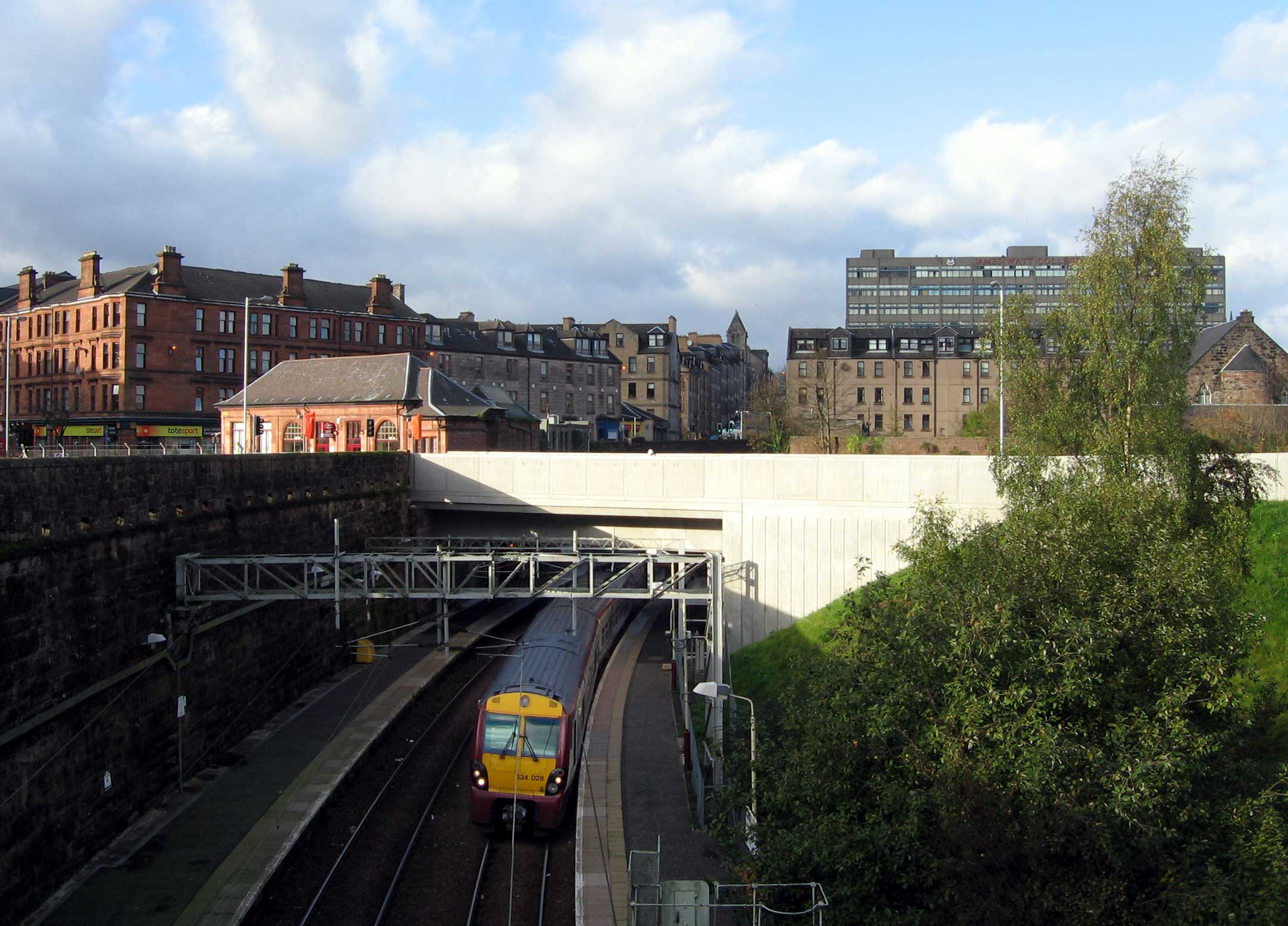
View looking west, to station building to the left of the new road bridge and a train at the eastbound platform. The James Watt College Finnart Campus stands behind houses to the right.

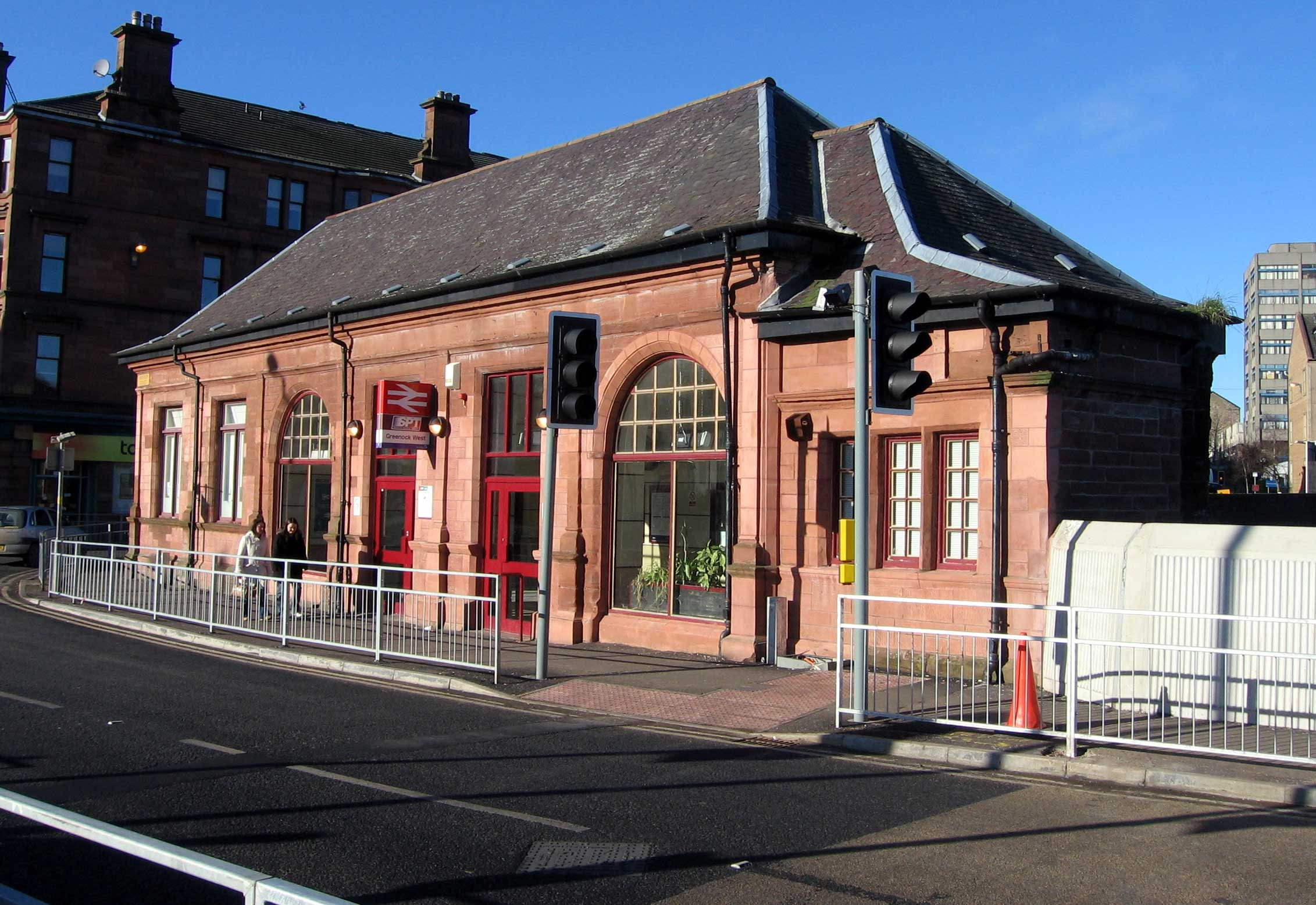
The station building seen from the new road bridge, the original arched doorways converted into windows and new narrow doors formed from central window openings

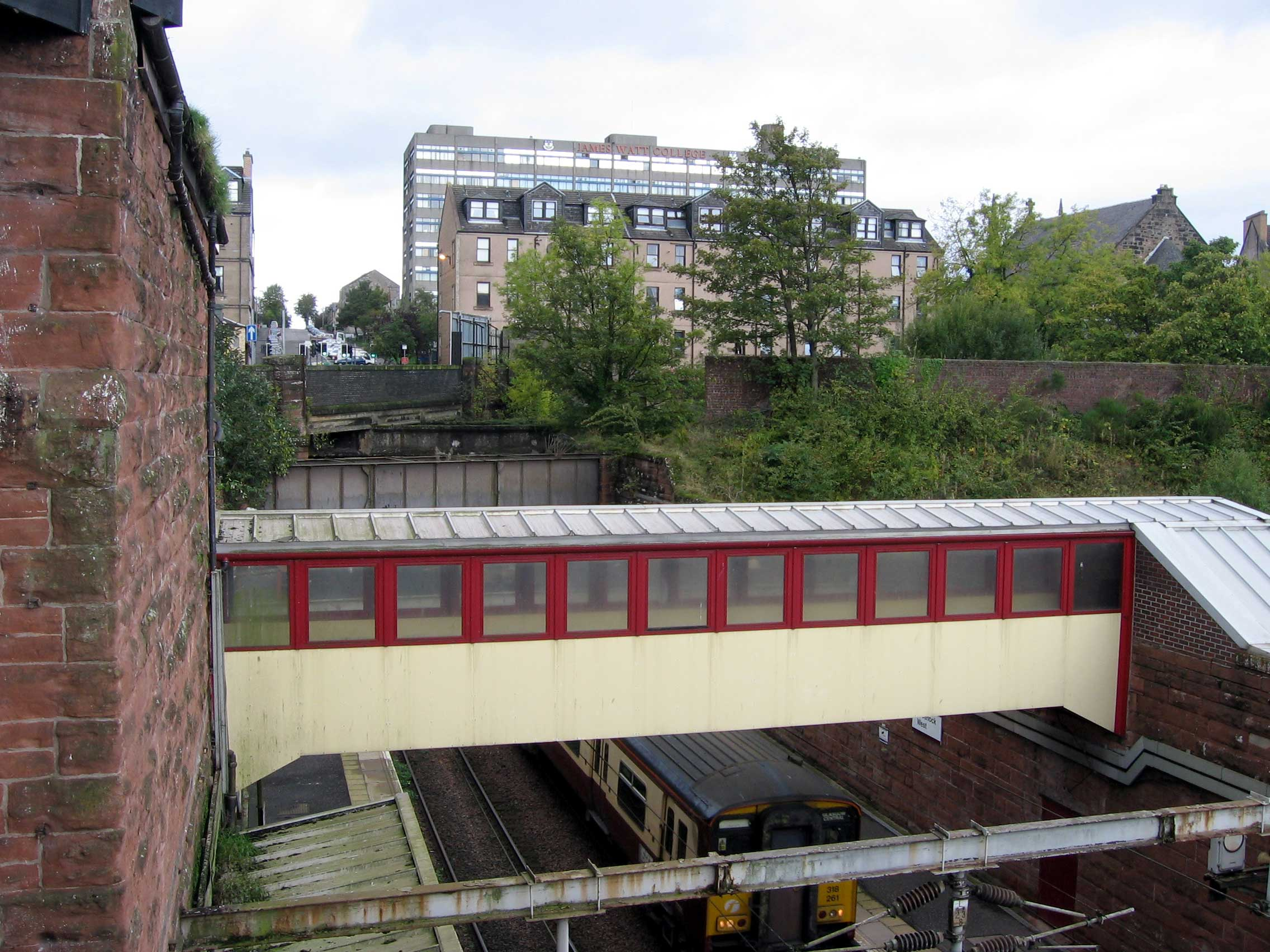
View down from the new road bridge showing the footbridge, with an eastbound train

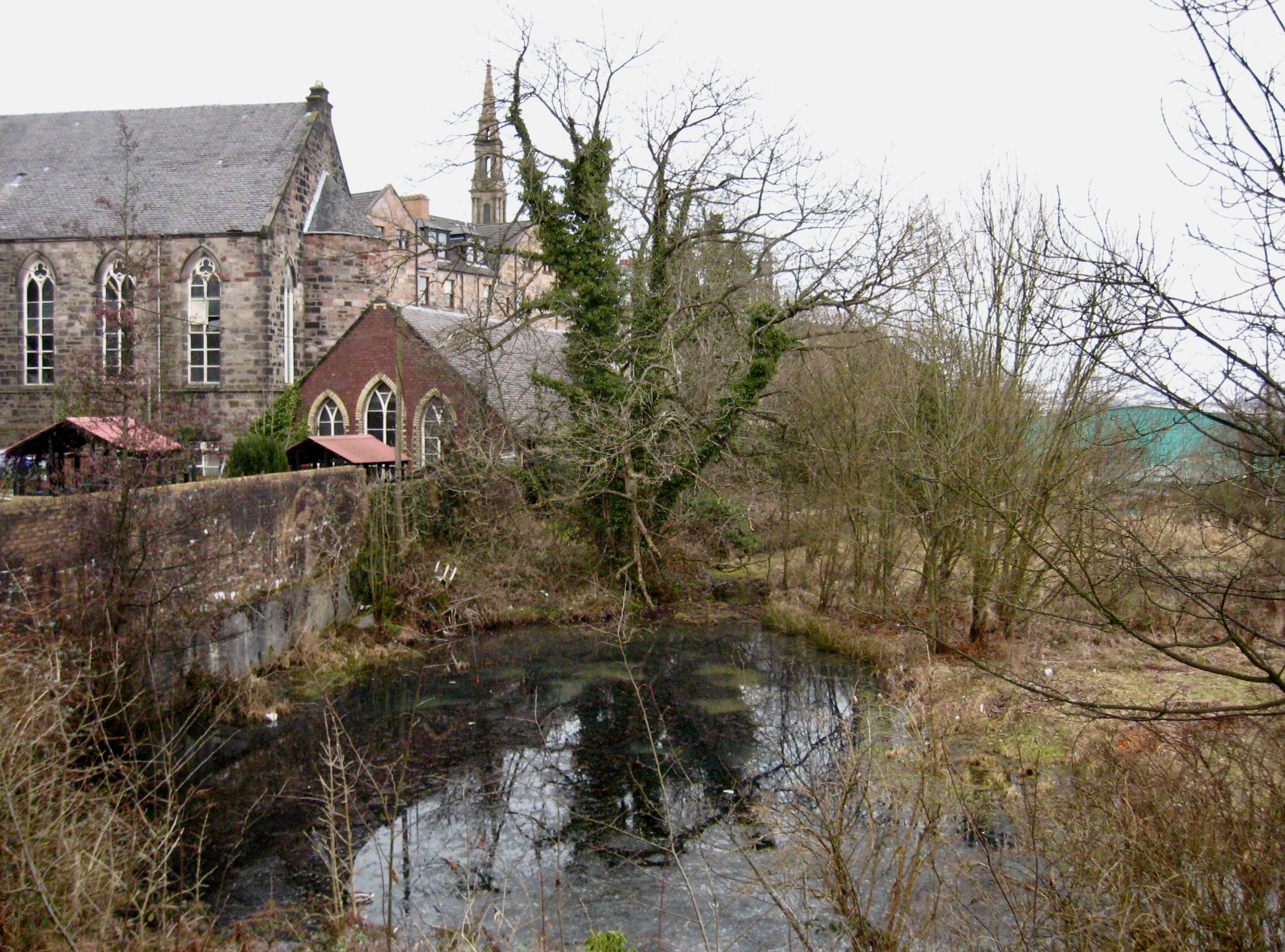
Mill pond adjacent to station

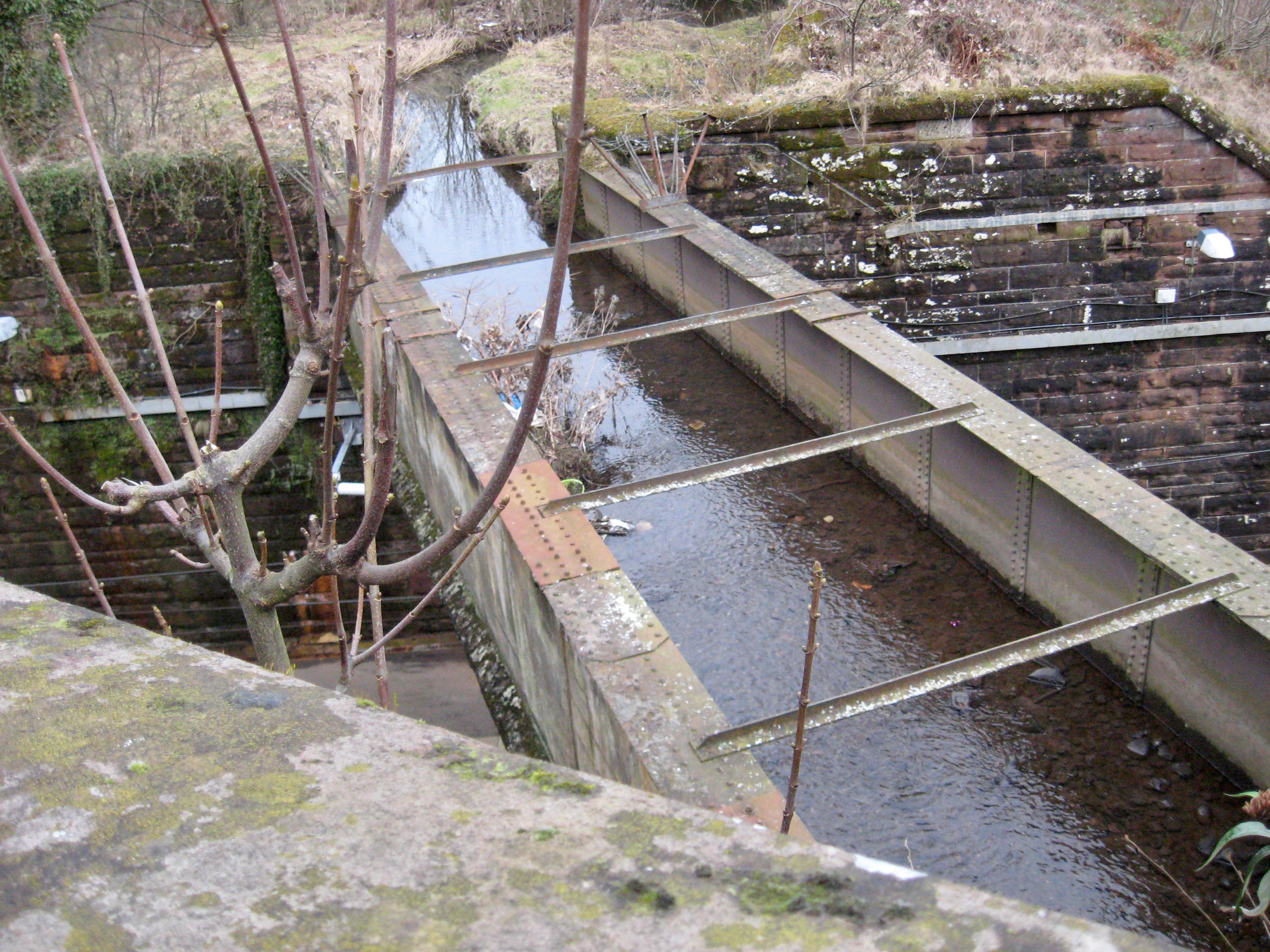
West Burn flowing in aqueduct

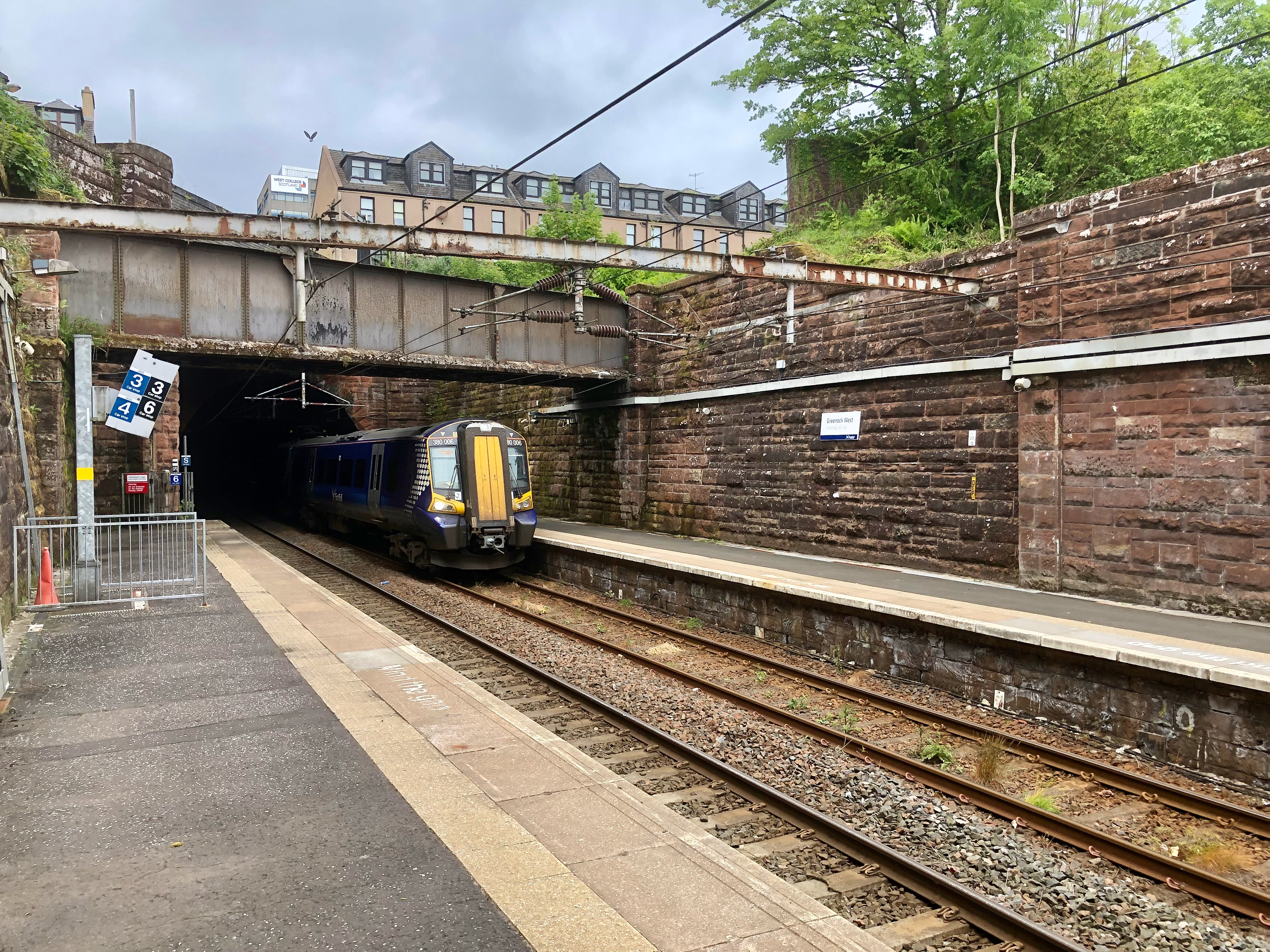
Train from Gourock via tunnel, arriving under aqueduct
