= Kilmarnock College =

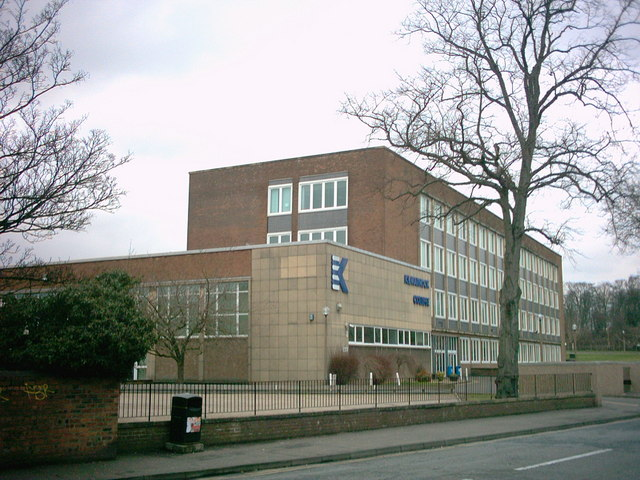
- Kilmarnock College building
- Former name: Kilmarnock Technical College
- Type: College
- Active: August 1966–1 August 2013
- Principal: Heather Dunk OBE
- Location: Kilmarnock, Scotland
- Campus: Holehouse Road, Townholm, Ayrshire Craig Centre, Gatehead.

Kilmarnock College, originally the Kilmarnock Technical College, was a college in Kilmarnock, Scotland. Since August 2013 it has been a campus of the new Ayrshire College as the result of a merger with Ayr College and James Watt College in Kilwinning and Largs. Plans for a new campus were announced in 2008. The college's last principal prior to the merger was Heather Dunk OBE.

The new college was built in 2014 and opened in 2016 on the site of the former Johnnie Walker bottling plant on Hill Street. As of 2020 the original Kilmarnock College building at Holehouse Road has been demolished and the campus has since been redeveloped for housing.
