= Ayrshire College =

College in Scotland

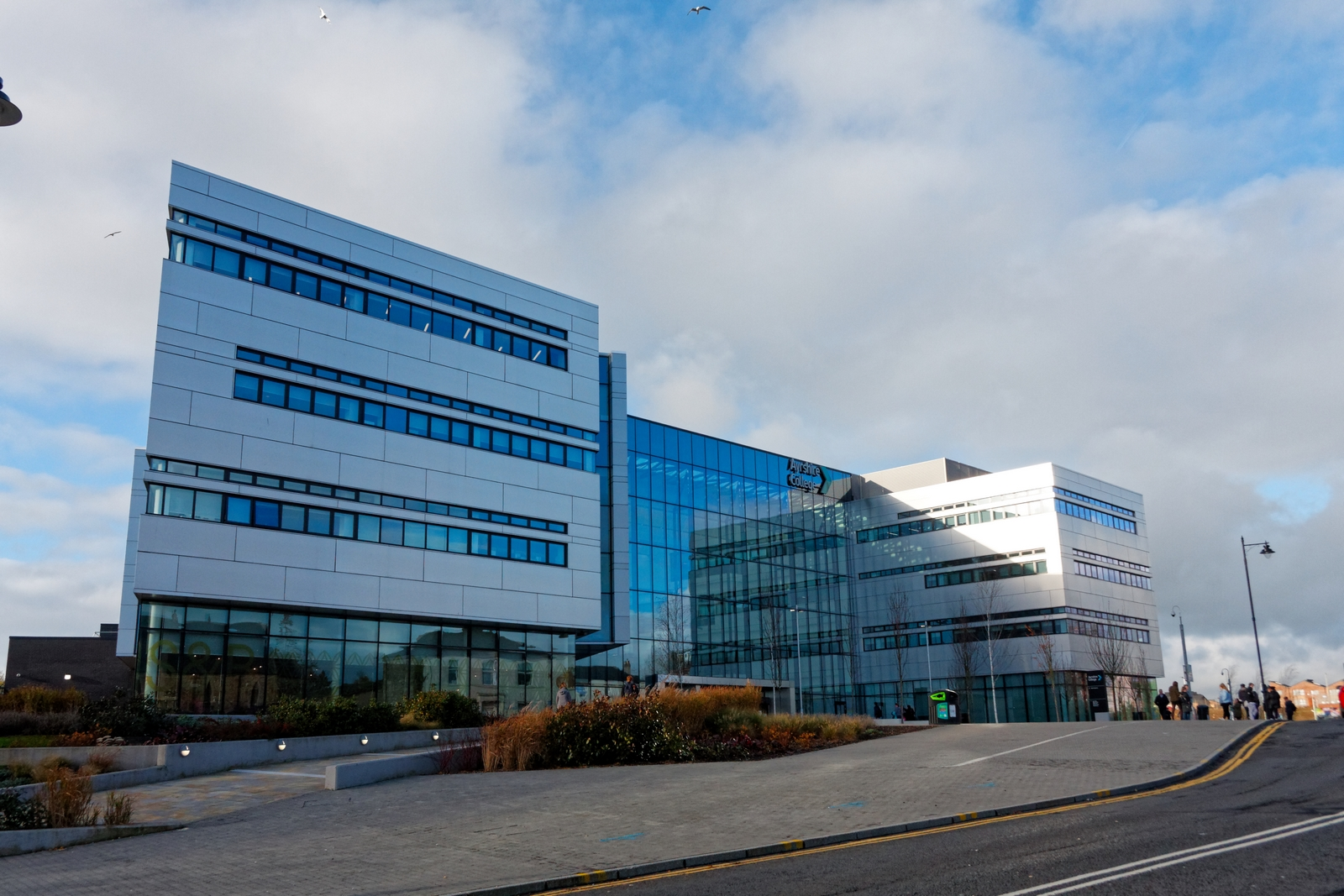
- The Kilmarnock Campus which opened in 2016
- Former names: Ayr College; Kilmarnock College; James Watt College
- Motto: Start Here, Go Anywhere
- Type: Further education college
- Established: 2013
- Chair: Fiona McQueen
- Vice-president: Anne Campbell
- Principal: Angela Cox
- Students: 13,284 (2017–2018)
- Location: Ayrshire, Scotland
- Campus: Ayr, Kilmarnock and Kilwinning
- Website: www1.ayrshire.ac.uk

Ayrshire College is a further education institution in Scotland. Formed in August 2013 from a merger between Ayr College, Kilmarnock College and the Largs and Kilwinning campuses of James Watt College, it serves Ayrshire and surrounding areas, with campuses in Ayr, Kilmarnock and Kilwinning.

== History ==
Ayrshire College was established on 1 August 2013, following the merger of the three main colleges in Ayrshire – Kilmarnock College, Ayr College as well as the Kilwinning and Largs campuses of James Watt College. Ayrshire College is an incorporated College under the Further and Higher education (Scotland) Act 1992. The college is a registered charity in Scotland with a registered charity number of (SCO21177).

The Kilwinning campus of the college was previously a campus of James Watt College. In the 1990s, James Watt College expanded to include campuses on the Greenock waterfront in Greenock, and at the Inverclyde National Sports Training Centre in Largs. The Ayrshire campuses were demerged to form part of the new Ayrshire College in 2013.

The Kilmarnock campus opened in October 2016. It was built on part of the site of the former Johnnie Walker bottling plant, following alcoholic beverage company Diageo's gifting of the location to the college. In 2009, Diageo, owner of Johnnie Walker, announced the proposed closure of the bottling plant facility in Hill Street, and in 2012, Diageo closed the facility with the loss of 700 jobs.

In February 2013, the principal of Kilmarnock College, Heather Dunk, was named the principal designate of Ayrshire College. The colleges registered address is the Ayr campus of the college, based at Dam Park in Ayr.

== Campuses ==
=== Main campuses ===
- Ayr Campus (Dam Park, Ayr)
- Kilmarnock Campus (Hill Street, Kilmarnock)
- Kilwinning Campus (Lauchlan Way, Kilwinning)

=== Other campuses ===
- Skills Centre for Excellence (Irvine Royal Academy, Kilwinning Road, Irvine)
- Nethermains Campus (Simpson Place, Kilwinning)
