= Sportscotland =

National sports organisation of Scotland

- spòrsalba (Scottish Gaelic)
- Formation: 1972
- Type: Executive non-departmental public body
- Legal status: Government agency
- Purpose: Sport governing body
- Headquarters: Glasgow
- Website: sportscotland.org.uk
- Formerly called: Scottish Sports Council

Sportscotland (Scottish Gaelic: Spòrsalba), formerly the Scottish Sports Council, is the national agency for sport in Scotland.

== Overview ==
The Scottish Sports Council was established in 1972 by royal charter. The body works in partnership with public, private and voluntary organisations. As an executive non-departmental public body of the Scottish Government, Sportscotland advises ministers and implements government policy for sport and physical recreation. In 2002/03, sportscotland invested approximately £48 million of government grants and lottery funds.

The organisation runs two national sport centres:

- National Centre Inverclyde, near Largs, North Ayrshire, for the training of national squads, hosting championships and facilities for boccia, table tennis, badminton, squash etc.
- National Centre Glenmore Lodge, in Glenmore Forest Park near Aviemore, facilities for skiing, rock climbing, mountaineering, hill walking, kayaking, canoeing etc.

In 1998 Sportscotland took over responsibility for the Scottish Institute of Sport and created the sportscotland institute of sport near the University of Stirling. Sportscotland invests in the majority of national sports governing bodies in Scotland, such as Scottish Athletics.

In March 2020, the organisation announced the closure later that year of the Cumbrae National Watersports Centre, following a review of the activities at the centre.

== Scottish Avalanche Information Service ==
Sportscotland funded the Scottish Avalanche Project in winter 1988–89, an avalanche forecasting service operating in Glencoe and the North Cairngorms. In winter 1989−90, Lochaber and Lochnagar were also covered. The project was then permanently adopted in 1991 and became Scottish Avalanche Information Service. South Cairngorms and Creag Meagaidh got added to coverage in winter 1996–97. When the Scottish Sports Council renamed itself to sportscotland, the service became the sportscotland Avalanche Information Service. Torridon and surroundings was added in winter 2014–15.
