= James Watt College =

College in Inverclyde, Scotland

- Type: Public college
- Established: 1908
- Undergraduates: Diploma and Certificate
- Location: Greenock, Scotland
- Campus: 17 urban/suburban

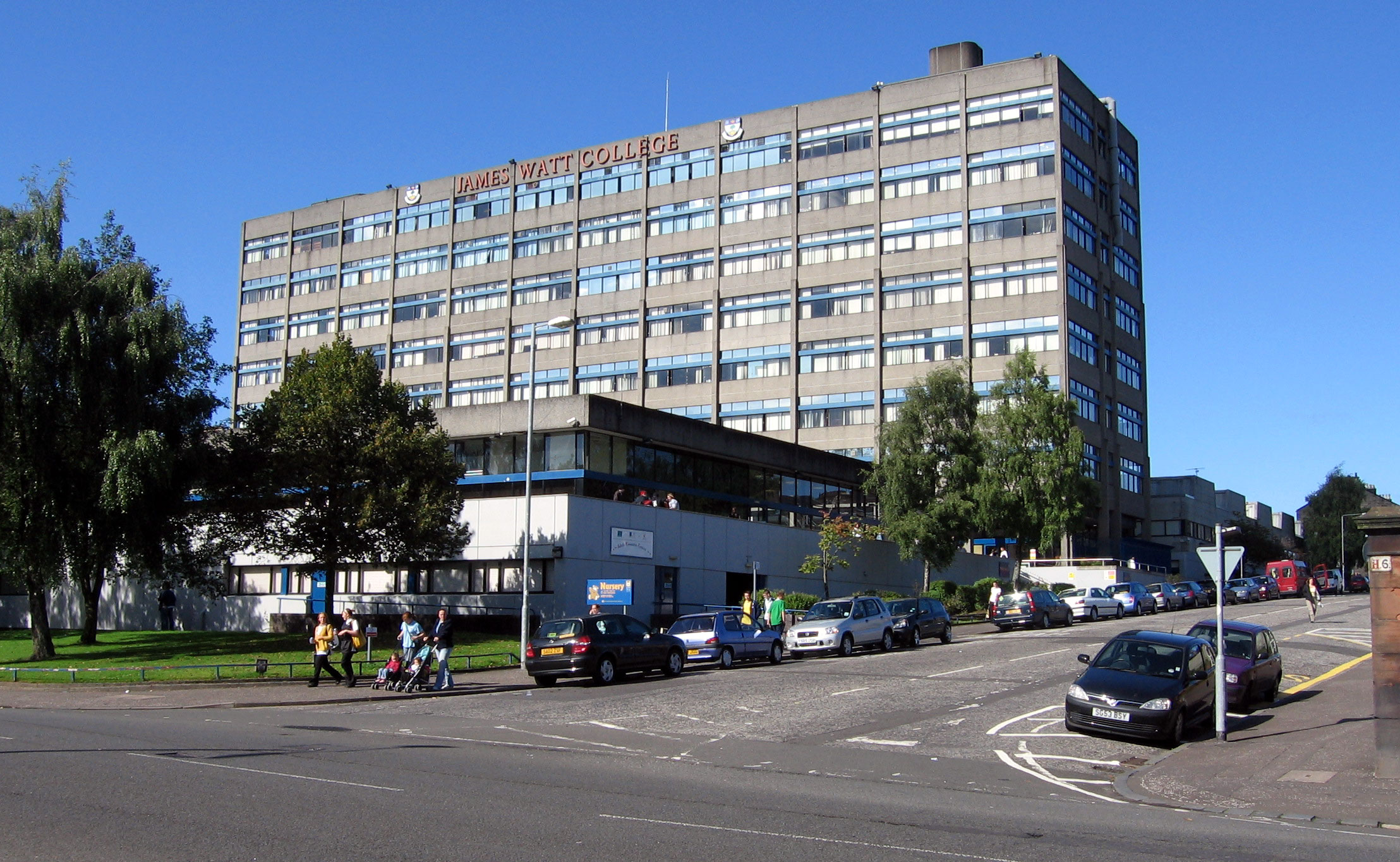
The Finnart Campus seen from Nelson Street 55.949°N 4.771°W

James Watt College was a further education college in Greenock, Scotland. It is now part of West College Scotland. There were also campuses in Largs and Kilwinning which now form part of Ayrshire College as the result of the merger with Kilmarnock College and Ayr College.

== History, facilities ==
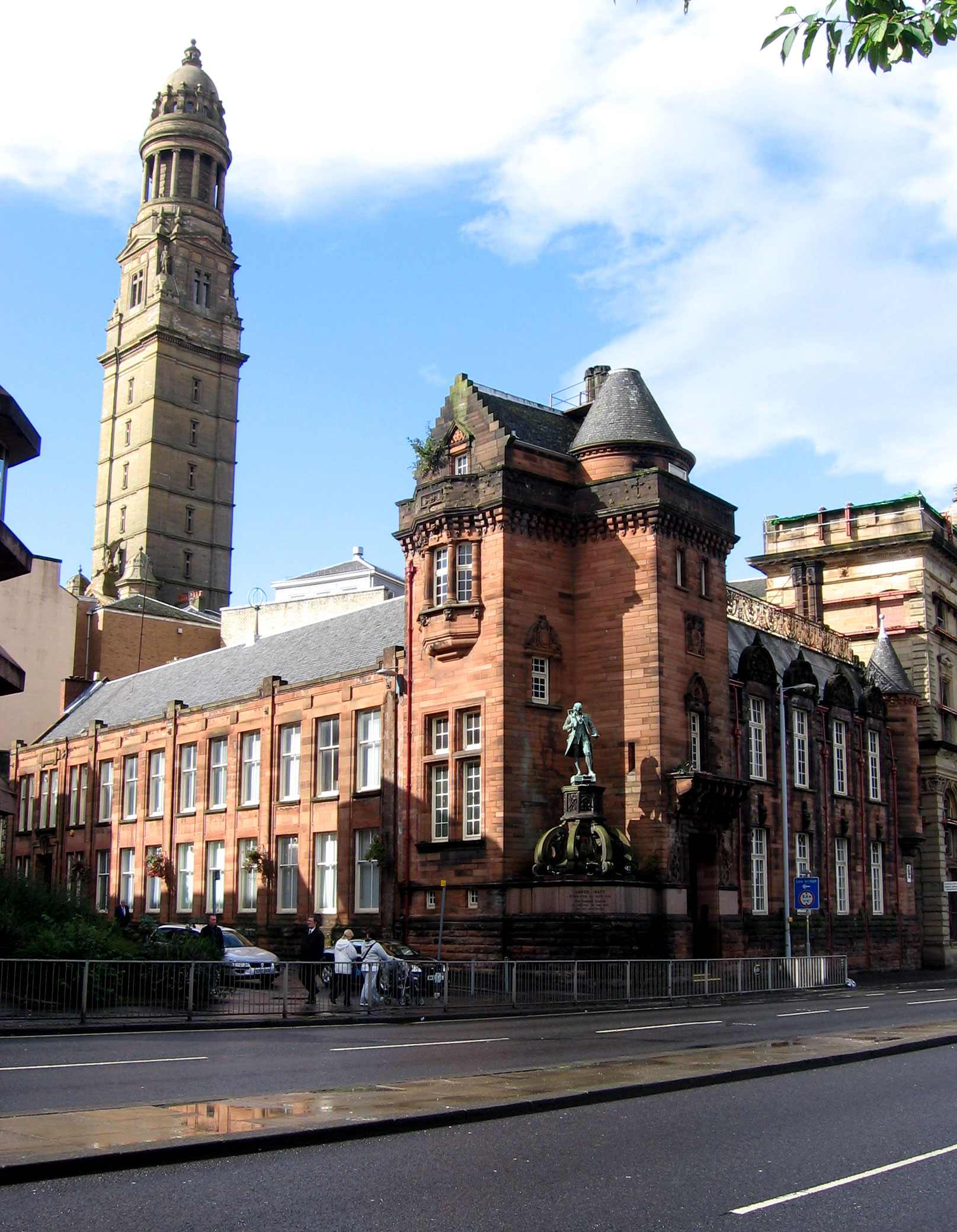
James Watt Memorial College building

The James Watt Memorial College on the corner of William Street and Dalrymple Street was officially opened as the Watt Memorial Engineering and Navigation School on 1 June 1908. The building was constructed near the site of James Watt's birthplace (which was on the other side of William Street) and was built with funds donated by another famous Scot, Andrew Carnegie, who performed the opening ceremony, unveiling a statue of James Watt that stands prominently in the angle formed at the corner tower. H & D Barclay of Glasgow designed the original red sandstone building in a heavily ornamented Scottish baronial style, The corner is marked by an L-plan tower, the wing to William Street being capped by a crow step gable while the north wing has a conical roofed tower above a balustrade. The Dalrymple Street facade faces north out onto the main A8 road to Glasgow and is capped by a steep sloping roof up to an iron balustrade which protects a flat roof originally used to allow navigation students to take observations of the sun. The west corner features a corbelled corner turret with a conical roof. A later extension in William Street to the south of the tower is in a plainer more modern style. The building is now in use by Inverclyde Council local authority education department as office accommodation.

Over the years, the changing demands of commerce and industry highlighted the need for a new, purpose built College. The college relocated to its present Finnart Street site near Greenock West railway station in 1973, the eight-story main teaching block (by Boissevain and Osmond) dominating the area. The 1970s also witnessed a move away from traditional heavy industries into other areas of commerce and as a result, the college adapted to offer a different education focus.

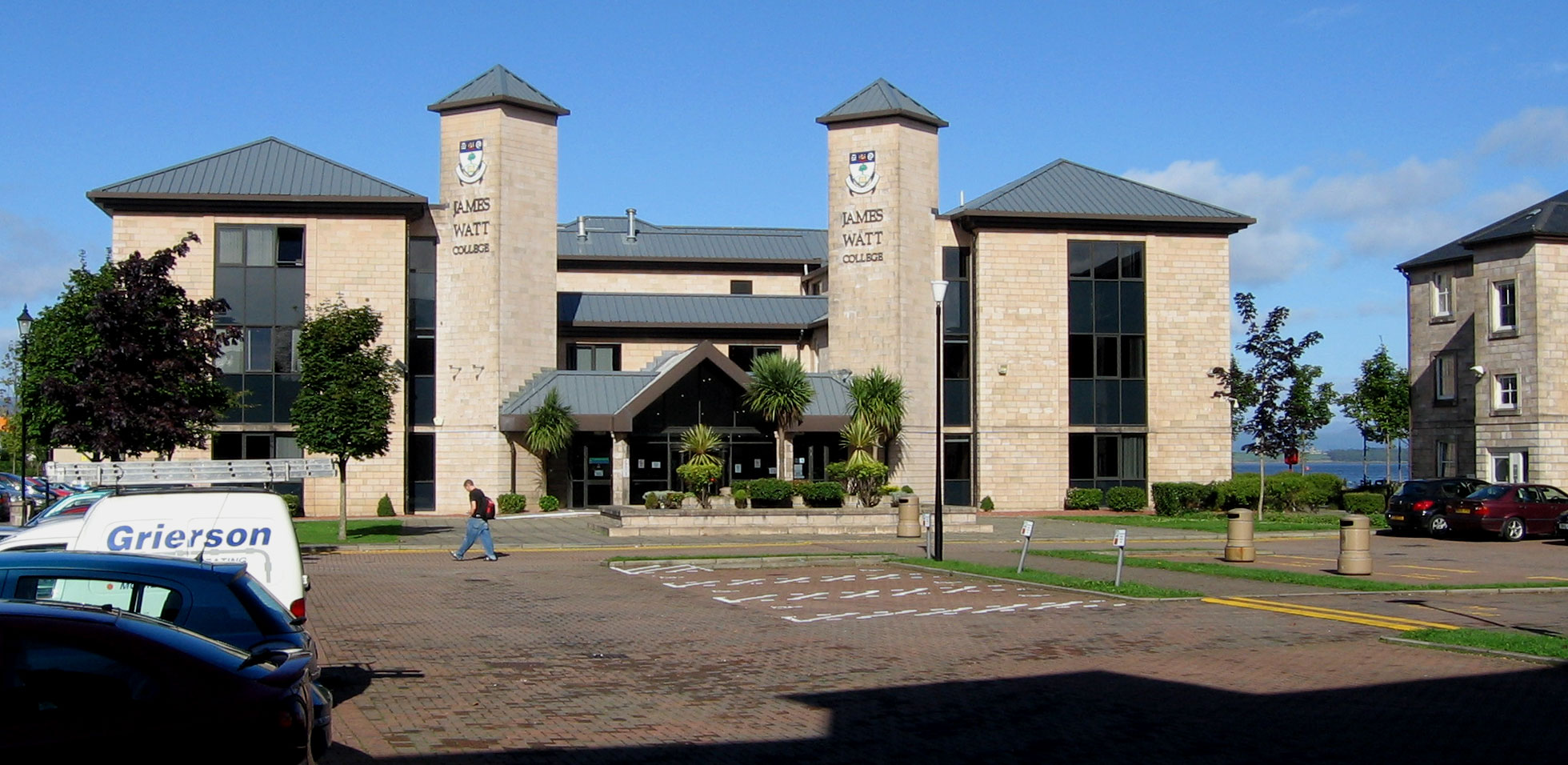
The Waterfront Campus in Greenock

In the 1990s the college expanded to include campuses on the Greenock waterfront, at Kilwinning in Ayrshire, and at the Inverclyde National Sports Training Centre in Largs. The Ayrshire campuses were demerged to form part of the new Ayrshire College in 2013.

The last (or next to last) principal was Sue Pinder OBE.

== Heraldry ==
The blazon of arms for James Watt College is: Argent, an oak tree on a mount Vert with an open book Or in base; on a chief Azure, a three-masted ship under sail Proper between a fountain and a spiral Argent.

The shield displays two special roundels, the fountain (a roundel barry wavy argent and azure) and the gurges (a roundel double spiral argent and azure).
