= Greenock Princes Pier railway station =

Closed railway station in Inverclyde, Scotland

Greenock Princes Pier
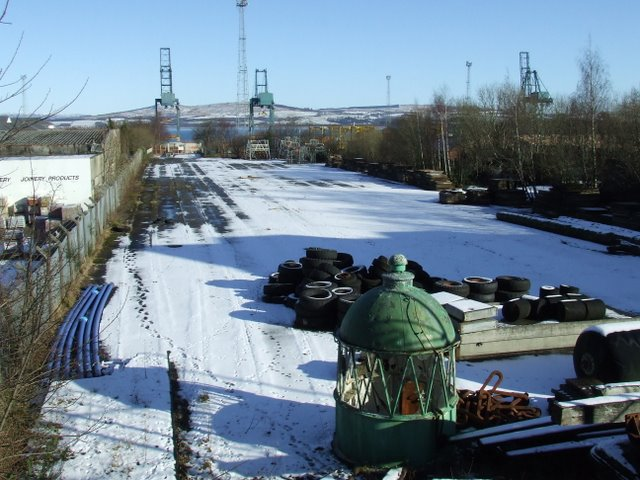
- The site of railway sidings and engine shed on the approach, in 2009

General information
- Location: Greenock, Inverclyde; Scotland
- Coordinates: 55.9564°N 4.7636°W
- Grid reference: NS275771
- Platforms: 6

Other information
- Status: Disused

History
- Original company: Greenock and Ayrshire Railway
- Pre-grouping: Glasgow and South Western Railway
- Post-grouping: LMS

Key dates
- 23 December 1869: Opened as Greenock Albert Harbour
- 1 May 1875: Renamed as Greenock Princes Pier
- 25 May 1894: Original station closed and replaced extending 90 m further north
- 30 November 1965: Closed
Location

Greenock Princes Pier was a railway station serving Greenock, Renfrewshire, Scotland, originally as part of the Greenock and Ayrshire Railway. It was approached by a tunnel sloping downhill under Greenock's west end, with railway sidings before the line crossed Brougham Street bridge over the main road to Gourock. The station was set on an embankment on the approach to Prince's Pier, with a line curving down to serve Albert Harbour.

The area of the station, pier and the infilled Albert Harbour is now occupied by Greenock Ocean Terminal container port and cruise ship passenger terminal.

== History ==
The station opened on 23 December 1869, as Greenock Albert Harbour. The station was set on an embankment, with an open path leading down to Prince's Pier. North British Railway through trains were advertised as running every week-day "between Edinburgh (Waverley and Haymarket Stations) and Greenock (Albert Harbour), carrying Passengers to and from Prince's Pier, Greenock, without change of Carriage, and thus placing them alongside the Clyde Steamers without walking through the streets." The station was renamed as Greenock Princes Pier on 1 May 1875. In 1877 the Glasgow and South Western Railway advertised that "Passengers are landed at the Prince's Pier Station, from whence there is a Covered Way to the Pier where the Steamers call, and Passengers Luggage is conveyed, free of charge, between the Stations and the Steamers."

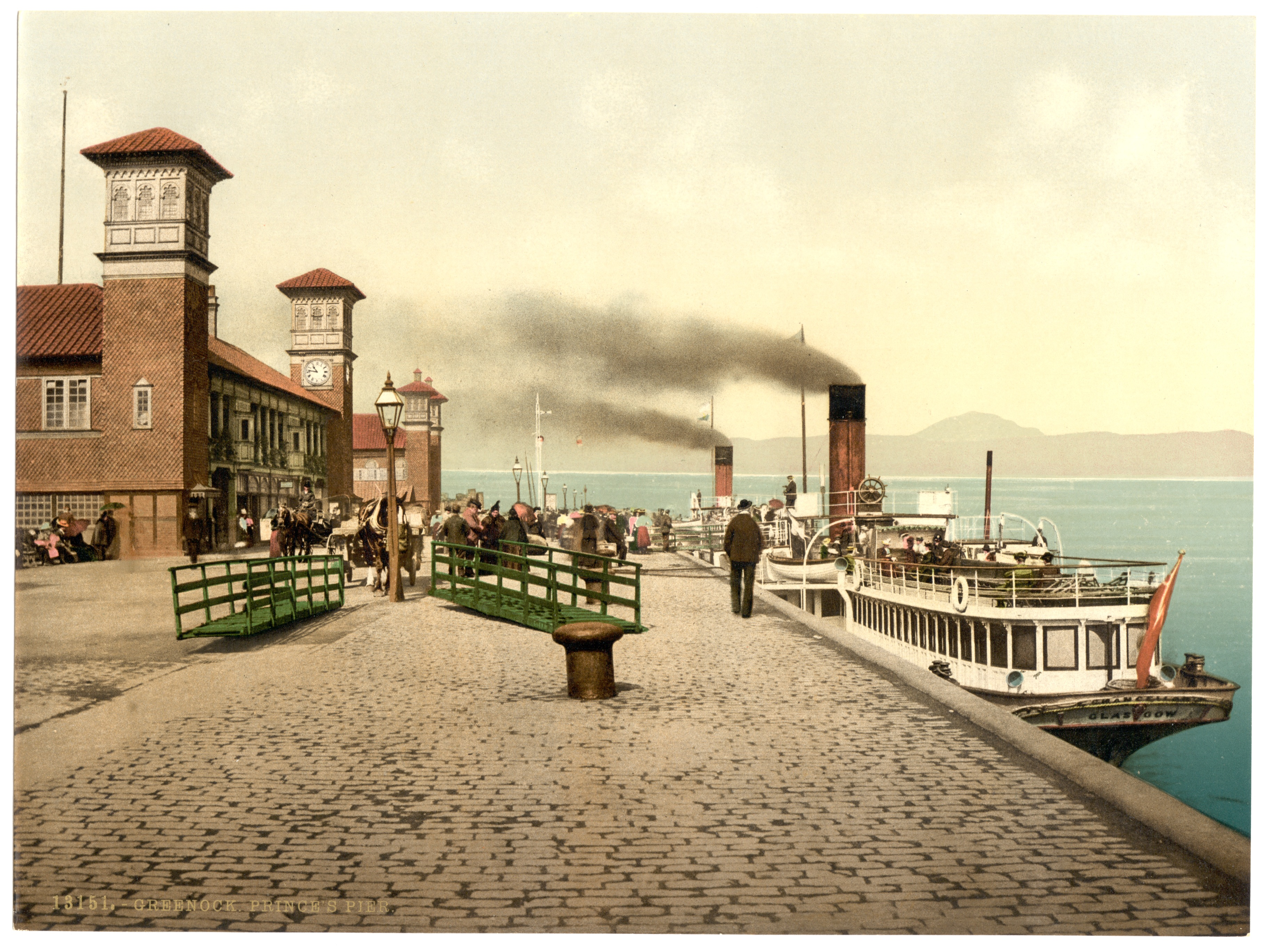
The new station buildings were extended to the edge of the quayside, with curved covered ramps on each side.

On 25 May 1894 the original station was closed and replaced by a new station extended 90 m to the north.

On 2 February 1959, stopping passenger services from Glasgow and Paisley ceased running beyond Kilmacolm; however, the St Enoch boat trains continued running, without stopping until 30 November 1965.

Preceding station	Historical railways	Following station
Terminus	Glasgow and South Western Railway; Greenock and Ayrshire Railway	Lynedoch; Line and station closed
