= Greenock and Ayrshire Railway =

Former railway line in Scotland

Overview
- Locale: Scotland
- Dates of operation: 1 September 1869–1 August 1872
- Successor: Glasgow and South Western Railway

Technical
- Track gauge: 1,435 mm (4 ft 8 1/2 in)

The Greenock and Ayrshire Railway ran from Greenock, Scotland to Bridge of Weir, connecting there to the Glasgow and South Western Railway and making a through connection between Glasgow and Greenock. It closed progressively between 1959 and 1983.

== Formation ==
By the 1860s, the Glasgow and South Western Railway (G&SWR) was established in the south-western quadrant of Scotland, but the rival Caledonian Railway was dominant in the central region, with an important branch line to Greenock. There was bitter rivalry between the two companies, and each sought to retain primacy in its own area.

In 1864, an independent Bridge of Weir Railway, encouraged by the G&SWR, opened their line from Johnstone to Bridge of Weir. At that time the G&SWR was interested in reaching Greenock, where there was lucrative business associated with coastal and international shipping. The Caledonian Railway had a monopoly of the rail connection, and in October 1864 the Chairman of the G&SWR negotiated with the Provost of the Burgh of Greenock regarding improved rail and harbour facilities. The Caledonian Railway ended in the town at Cathcart Street, and its restricted rail access to the East Harbour involved street running. The growing trade in passenger steamer transits to towns and resorts in the Firth of Clyde was inhibited by the necessary five minute walk from the station to the berth past overcrowded housing.

The G&SWR offered the possibility of a new direct rail connection to a new harbour and pier to the north-west of the town, which the Burgh was then constructing. This was a prodigious scheme for both parties, involving lengthy tunnelling for the railway. The excavation and construction of the Albert Harbour facilities cost £250,000. Prince's Pier cost around further £100,000. The railway part of the scheme was to involve the upgrading of the Bridge of Weir line, the construction of a short line from Cart Junction (on that line) to Elderslie, and a new line from Bridge of Weir to Greenock.

Greenock and Ayrshire Railway Act 1865
- Act of Parliament
- Parliament of the United Kingdom
- Long title: An Act for making Railways from Greenock to the Glasgow and South-western and Bridge of Weir Railways; and for other Purposes.
- Citation: 28 & 29 Vict. c. ccci

Dates
- Royal assent: 5 July 1865

Text of statute as originally enacted

The Greenock and Ayrshire Railway was authorised by the Greenock and Ayrshire Railway Act 1865 (28 & 29 Vict. c. ccci) on 5 July 1865, with capital of £350,000, but money had become scarce again and the G&SWR was obliged to subscribe for £300,000 of the share capital.

== Opening ==
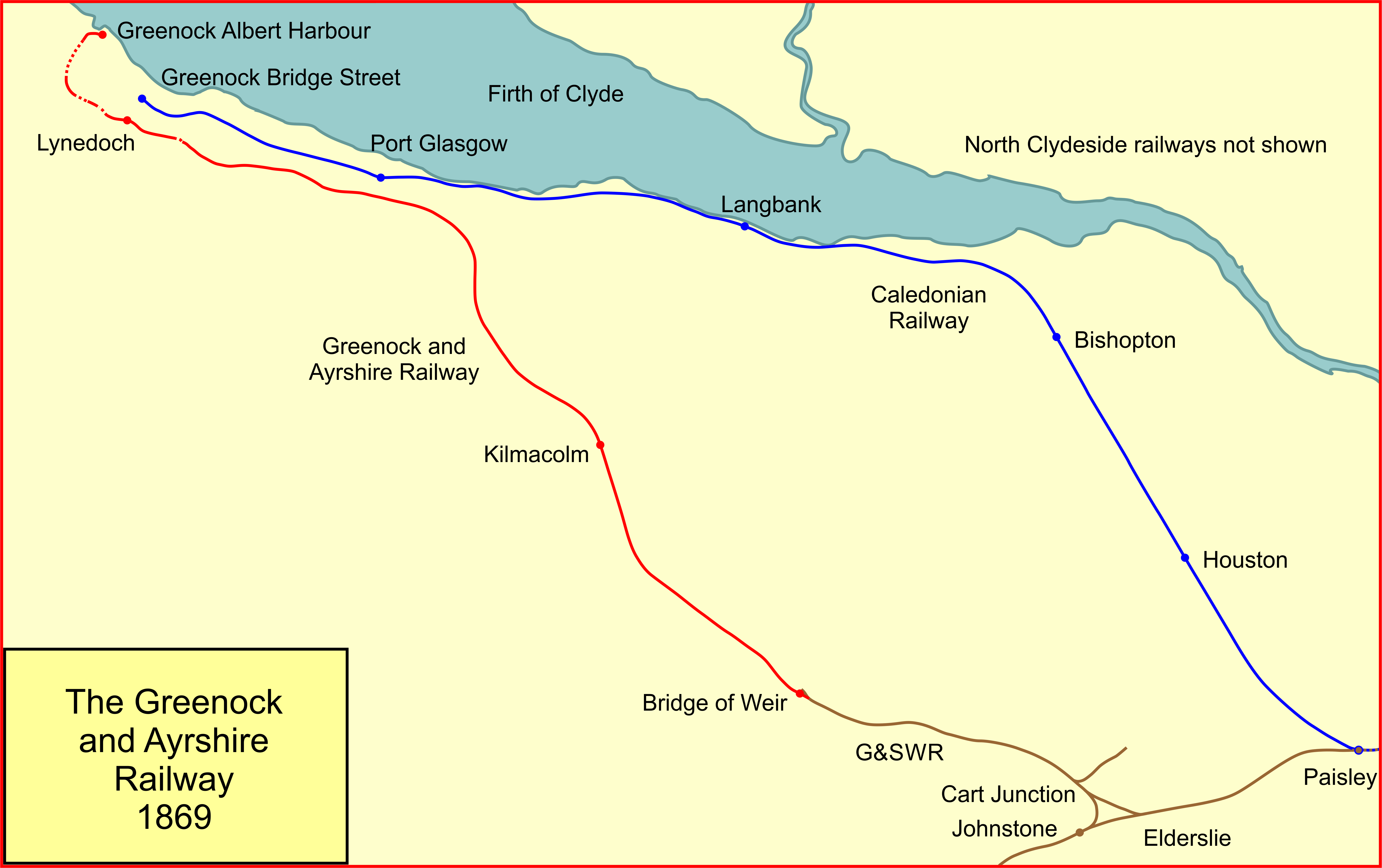
System map of the Greenock and Ayrshire Railway in 1869

Construction proceeded and the line opened to goods trains on or soon after 30 August 1869, and to passengers on 23 December 1869; the line was worked by the G&SWR. The Greenock terminal was named Albert Harbour, and as well as Clyde coastal shipping, there was a considerable emigrant trade at this time. Intermediate traffic was relatively insignificant and passenger traffic between Glasgow and Paisley and Greenock was in direct competition, both routes using the Bridge Street station in Glasgow. A fares war quickly took hold in 1870, but in early 1871 a common fares arrangement was agreed, by which the G&SWR received 42.68% of ticket receipts. Evidently the supposed advantage of proximity to the quayside at Greenock (and a shorter route from Carlisle and Kilmarnock, via Johnstone) did not result in dominance in traffic share. Goods traffic to Greenock could use either company to reach the East Dock (via the CR) or the west (Albert Dock) via the G&SWR. (Note: This arrangement was agreed, according to Ross, but it is not clear by what route the exchange could take place in the early years.)

== Amalgamation ==
Glasgow and South Western and Greenock and Ayrshire Railways Amalgamation Act 1872
- Act of Parliament
- Parliament of the United Kingdom
- Long title: An Act for the amalgamation of the Greenock and Ayrshire Railway Company with the Glasgow and South-western Railway Company; and for other purposes.
- Citation: 35 & 36 Vict. c. cxi

Dates
- Royal assent: 18 July 1872

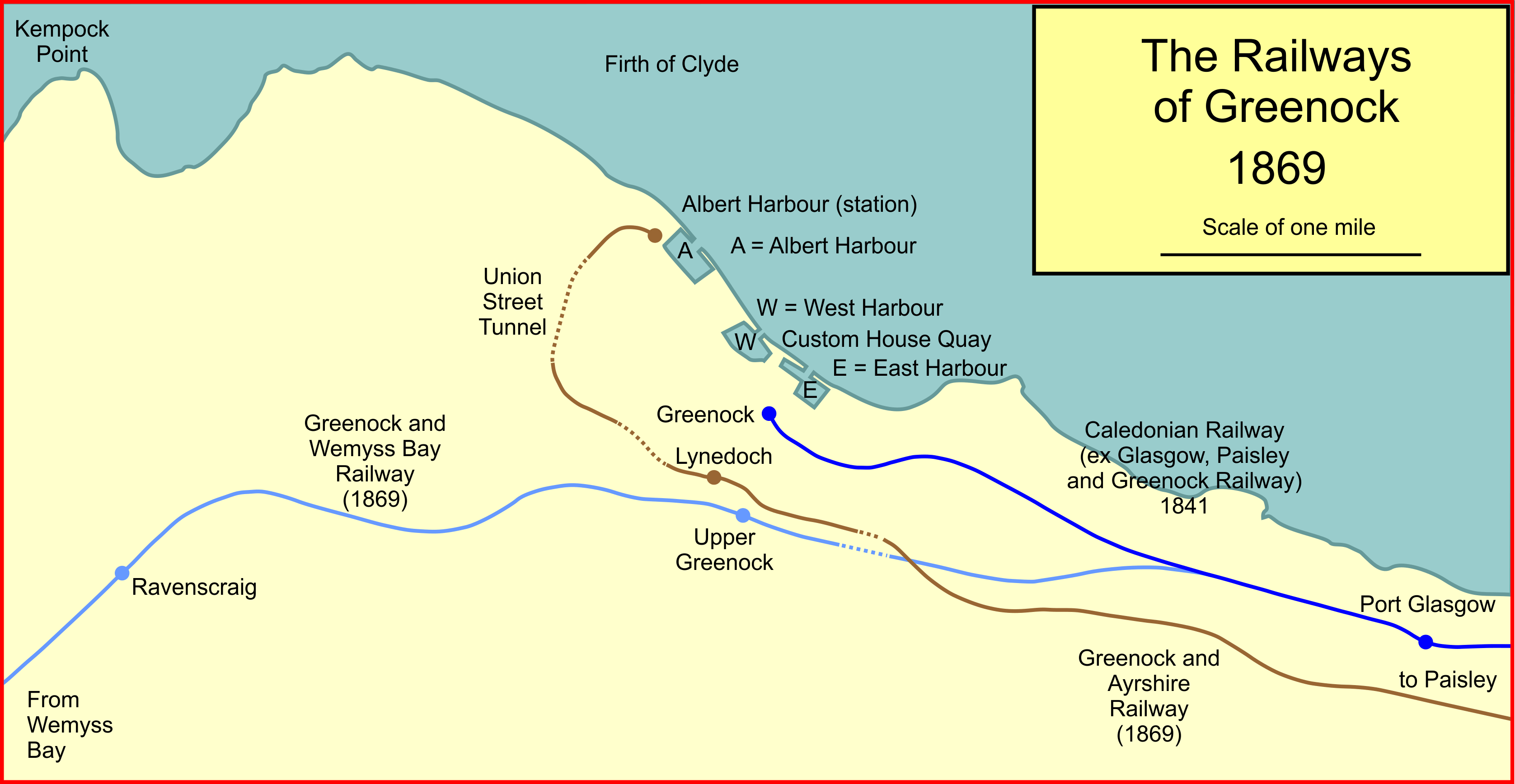
Greenock railways in 1869

The Greenock and Ayrshire had been nominally independent but the G&SWR had £300,000 of the £350,000 capital; the Glasgow and South Western and Greenock and Ayrshire Railways Amalgamation Act 1872 (35 & 36 Vict. c. cxi) was enacted on 29 June 1872, and it became effective on 1 August 1872. The line was now part of the G&SWR.

== Subsequent history ==
The Greenock Harbour Trust had been continuing improvement of the harbour, providing alongside berthing for quick turnrounds, and with more capacity. In 1875, Prince Alfred, Duke of Edinburgh, landed at Prince's Pier and the opportunity was taken to give the station itself the same name. In 1894 the station was relocated 100 yards (91 m) to the north-west, closer to the steamer berths and providing more lavish facilities, featuring six Italianate towers.

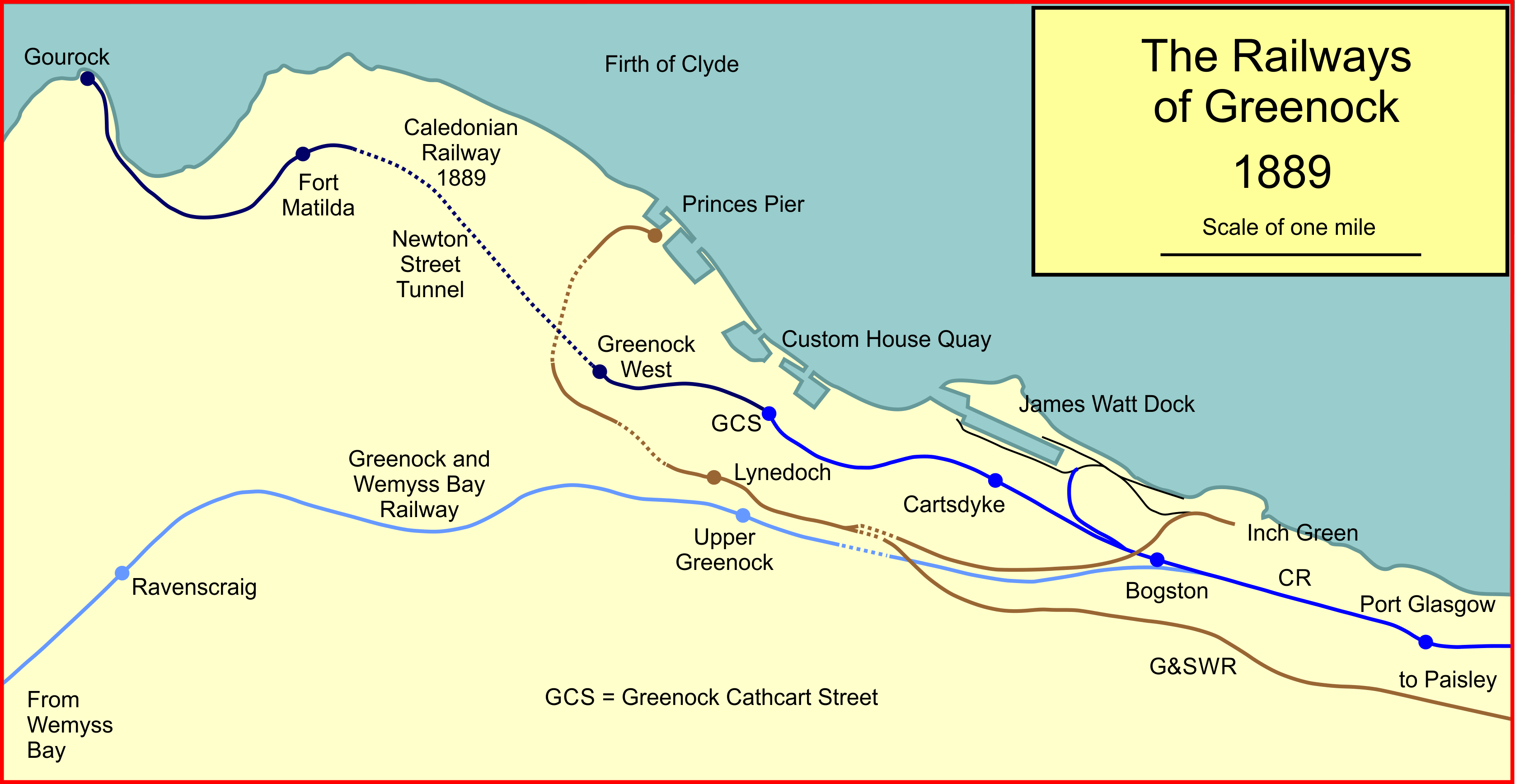
Greenock railways in 1889

In 1880, the harbour facilities to the eastern side of Greenock were being further extended, at Garvel, at the east end of the waterfront. When completed it provided three miles (5 km) of quays with the most modern mechanical handling equipment. The G&SWR wished to retain its place in the marine activity and decided to build a connecting line eastwards from Lynedoch, requiring a short tunnel. The line opened on 5 August 1886; the junction at Lynedoch was named Cartsburn Junction, and G&SWR trains reversed there, descending to a spur at Inchgreen, where they reversed again to reach the quay. The Caledonian Railway also had a connection to the new facility; their access was somewhat easier. The G&SWR's branch had cost £262,467.

The west curve at Johnstone, giving through running from that station towards Greenock, was an accident of history (of the Bridge of Weir Railway). Use of the curve by passenger trains was discontinued on 1 October 1900.

=== 1912 flooding ===
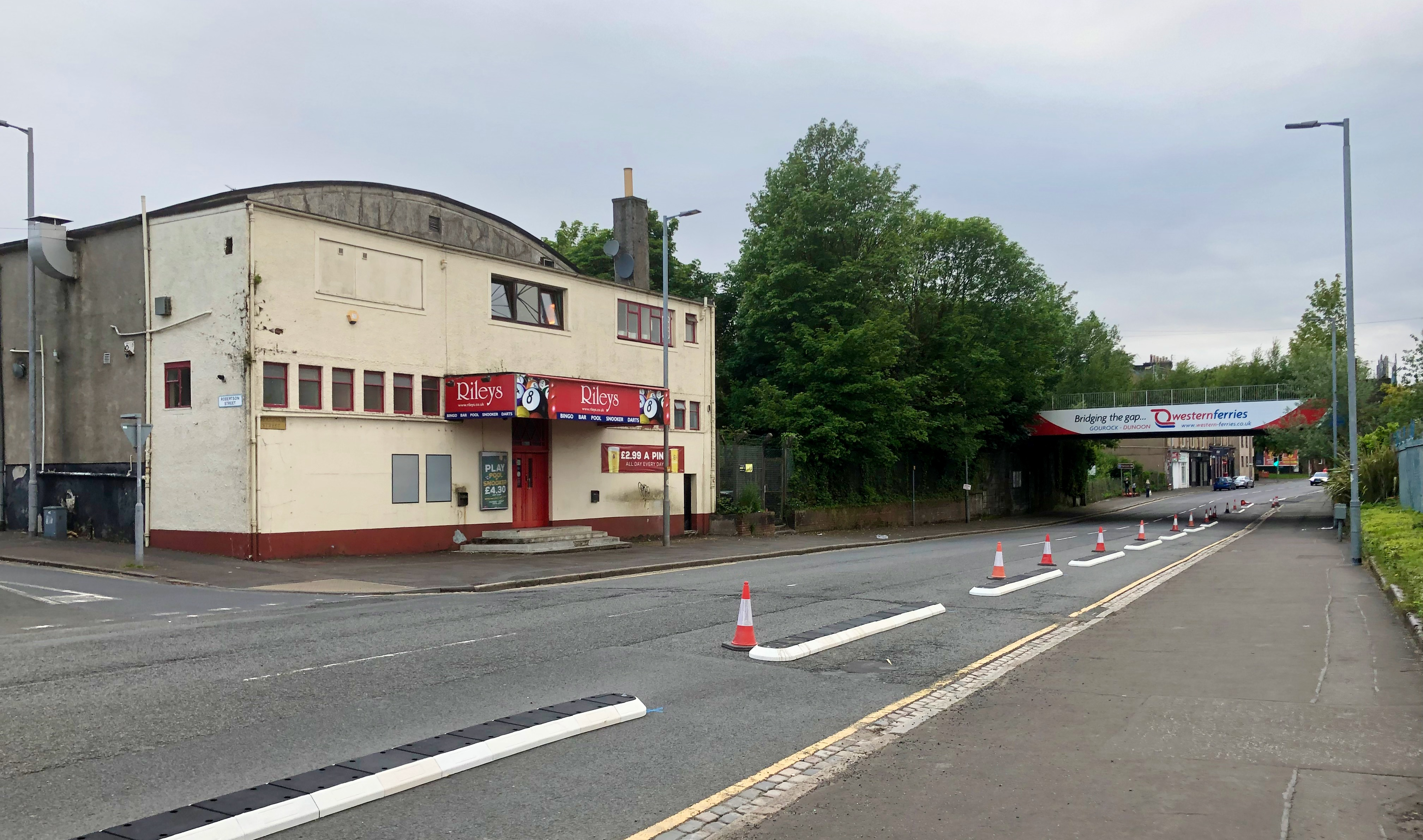
Former Picture Palace Cinema, and Brougham Street dip under railway bridge, negotiated when G&SWR got Parliamentary approval for its line to Albert Harbour.

About 0.7 miles (1.1 km) west of Lynedoch station, the G&SWR put the West Burn in a culvert under their railway line. In 1909, the burgh corporation built Lady Alice Park upstream from the railway by culverting the river for about 400 yards (370 m), with a children's pond at its inlet, and filled its valley to form a level playing area higher than Inverkip Road which sloped down beside the river. The east end of this culvert flows into an open channel for about 70 yards (64 m) before the railway culvert.

On 5 August 1912 storms and torrential rain brought a torrent down the West Burn, and overspill on to Inverkip Road worsened when the corporation's culvert inlet was blocked by debris and their pond overflowed. Water which would have gone safely down the former valley now ran down the road. Flooding increased around the Caledonian's West Station, and its retaining wall partially collapsed. The G&SWR was protected at first by a woodyard and garage, but as they flooded, the garage was swept into the open channel. Debris including one car blocked the mouth of the culvert under the line, and its parapet wall to the railway collapsed. A rush of water swept debris including a second car down the sloping tunnel to Princes Pier station, and flooded the sidings preceding their bridge over Brougham Street. Tenements on either side of the bridge, owned by the G&SWR and tenanted by their staff, were flooded and badly damaged. Water filled the dip in the road under the bridge, and flowed over the goods station to the Clyde. Rescue facilities were set up in the Picture Palace Cinema, and photographs taken from its upper floor showed water pouring over the sidings.

Both railways sued the Corporation of Greenock, in cases which set precedent for law on culverts, and on appeal the House of Lords decided the cases in favour of the railways.

=== 1936 runaway ===
David Smith records an accident:

A most destructive breakaway occurred on ... 10 April 1936. A train of 37 wagons of cattle left Albert Harbour for Carlisle at 9.00 p.m., double headed, the pilot engine being a 2-6-4 tank. They were up about Mearns Street when the pilot slipped violently. In the consequent surge and recoil a coupling broke between the sixth and seventh vehicles. This left 31 on the van, and old Dan Taylor of St Johns did his best, but could not hold them. Down they went through the tunnels. At Princes Pier station no. 637 was sitting at Platform 3 with a train for Glasgow. [The train was empty but] the runaway crashed into no. 637. There was terrible destruction of wagons and beasts ... Fifty-one of the cattle were killed or had to be slaughtered.

== Closure ==
Stopping services over the northern section of line, beyond Kilmacolm, were cut in February 1959 although goods trains, and also special boat trains from Glasgow St Enoch continued to run until 30 November 1965; during this period the line beyond Kilmacolm was singled. Stopping passenger services ceased running beyond Kilmacolm in February 1959. However the Glasgow St Enoch railway station to Greenock Prince's Pier Ocean Liner boat trains continued running until 30 November 1965. The tracks were then cut at Kilmacolm in September 1966.

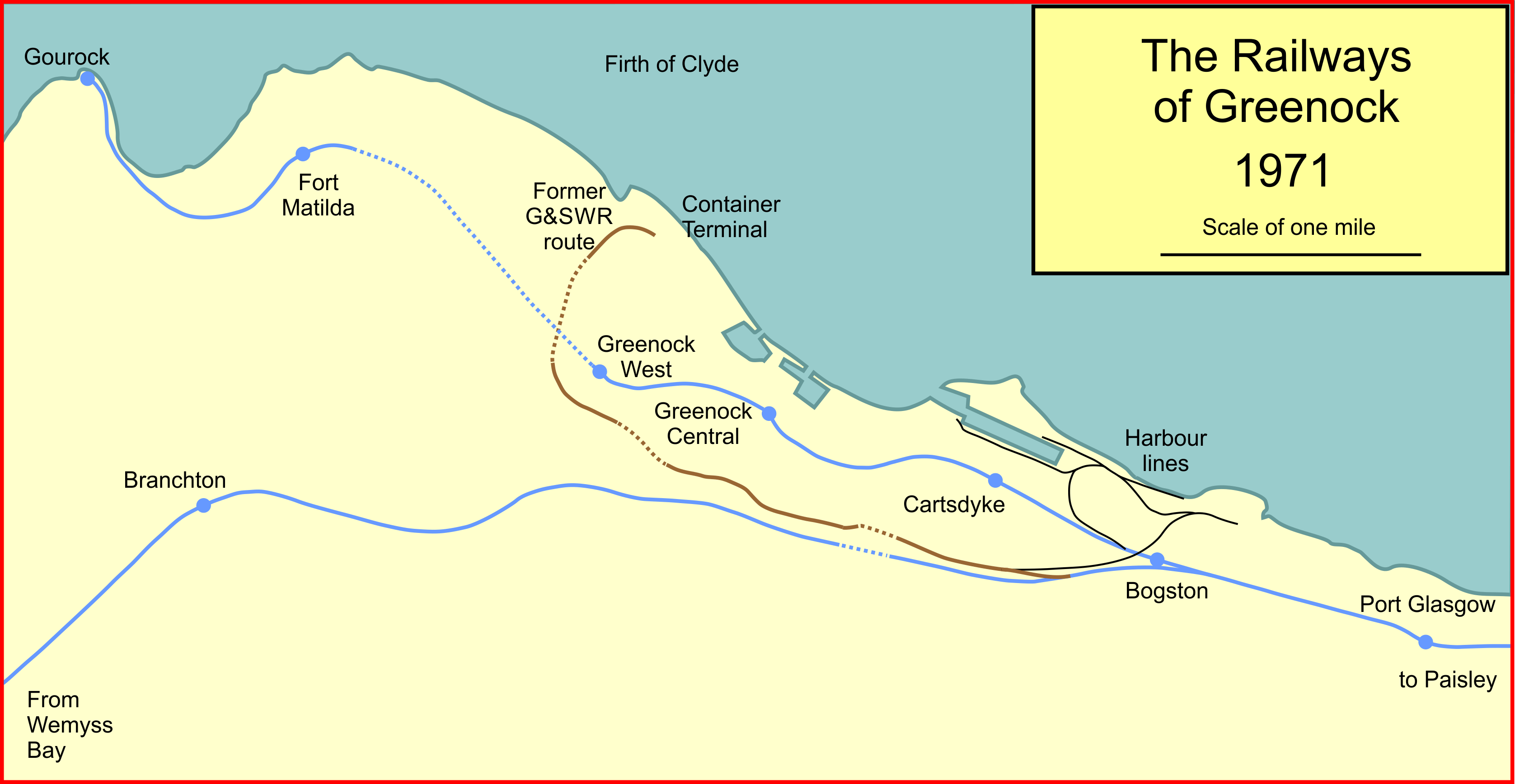
Greenock railways in 1971

However this was not the end of rail connection to Princes Pier: it was redeveloped as a container terminal, operated by the Clyde Port Authority, and rail connection was reinstated in 1971. The original line and the James Watt Dock connection were close alongside the Wemyss Bay line from Port Glasgow immediately east of Lynedoch, and a connection was made there: so the original G&AR line was re-opened to container traffic west of Lynedoch. The line was now single and laid in the centre of the tunnels, enabling 8 foot (2.44 m) containers to pass.

In fact this did not prove a long-term opportunity, and rail movement became dormant for many years; containers in use were larger than the original 8-foot size, and cannot be moved through the tunnels, and the line was officially closed on 30 September 1991.

The 1966 closure at Greenock left the line open from Elderslie to Kilmacolm; local passenger services continued, using diesel multiple units. That section too closed completely on 10 January 1983.

== Topography ==
The line ran from Bridge of Weir to Greenock, with a connection from Cartsburn Junction to James Watt Dock.

The main line opened to passengers on 23 December 1869; locations were:

- Connection at Bridge of Weir to the former Bridge of Weir Railway;
- Bridge of Weir station; the Bridge of Weir Railway station there was by-passed;
- Upper Port Glasgow; goods station only;
- Cartsburn Junction; not a passenger station;
- Lynedoch; renamed Greenock Lynedoch May 1898; closed 2 February 1959
- Greenock, Albert Harbour; renamed Greenock Princes Pier 1 May 1875; relocated a short distance north-west 25 May 1894; closed except to boat trains 2 February 1959; closed 30 November 1965.

The double-track route required five tunnels in two miles; the longest, Union Street Tunnel is 710 yards (649 m) in length on a falling gradient towards the Clyde of 1 in 70, with sharp curves at each end.

The James Watt branch was goods only; locations were

- Cartsburn Junction;
- Inch Green; reversing siding;
- James Watt Dock.

The large and attractive terminal station at Princes Pier was built on the quayside, attracting passengers who boarded Clyde steamers there to visit holiday resorts down the Firth of Clyde or to commute in summer to their villas around the shores of the firth. It took most of the steamer trade away from the Caledonian Railway whose Cathcart Street station was a short but inconvenient walk through part of Greenock to the Custom House quay, leading them to organise an extension to Gourock, with Gourock railway station opening as a rival terminal in 1889.
