= National Sports Training Centre Inverclyde =

Sports training facility in Largs, North Ayrshire, Scotland

Coordinates: 55.804°N 4.850°W

National Sports Training Centre Inverclyde is a sports training facility in Largs, North Ayrshire. It is the UK's first inclusive residential sports facility and caters for both elite athletes and the local community in a range of sports and activities. The facility is known in association football for being an education centre for managers.

== History ==
The facility is based in Largs, in a home built in the 19th century for the shipbuilder Robert Sinclair Scott. Until its purchase by the Scottish Council for Physical Recreation (SCPR), it had been the Hills Hotel, and also had been commandeered by the army during the Second World War.

The SCPR, the forerunner of the Scottish Sports Council, purchased the hotel in 1956. Lord Inverclyde was the president of the SCPR, whose vision it was to establish a 'home' for Scottish sport. When Inverclyde died in 1957, the SCPR decided to name their new national recreation centre in his memory. It was opened by the Queen in 1958.

=== Football coaching ===
The centre is famous for training a generation of football managers such as Jose Mourinho, Fabio Capello, Andre Villas-Boas, Giovanni Trapattoni, Marcelo Lippi and Carlos Queiroz. However this success led to accusations that the ideas developed created a "Largs Mafia" in football coaching. The football coaching courses moved to the new national football centre at Oriam in the mid-2010s.

== Facilities ==
The facility is now part of sportscotland. It comprises grass pitches, floodlit all-weather surfaces, an 860m square fitness suite and physical preparation area, fully equipped meeting rooms. It also has 60 twin bedrooms and has been recently rebuilt with inclusivity in mind. Although its principal function is to provide a practice area or a base for elite athletes and teams, it is also open to the local community to become members of the fitness suite, attend classes or hire a court or pitch 7 days a week.

== Redevelopment ==
National Sports Training Centre Inverclyde underwent a £12m redevelopment and opened in its current form in April 2017. It now offers inclusive facilities all under one roof and can cater for 120 wheelchair users in its residential facilities at any one time. The redevelopment was funded by the Scottish Government Commonwealth Games Legacy Fund, sportscotland and North Ayrshire Council.
