= Lochwinnoch railway station (1905–1966) =

Defunct railway station in Renfrewshire, Scotland

Lochwinnoch
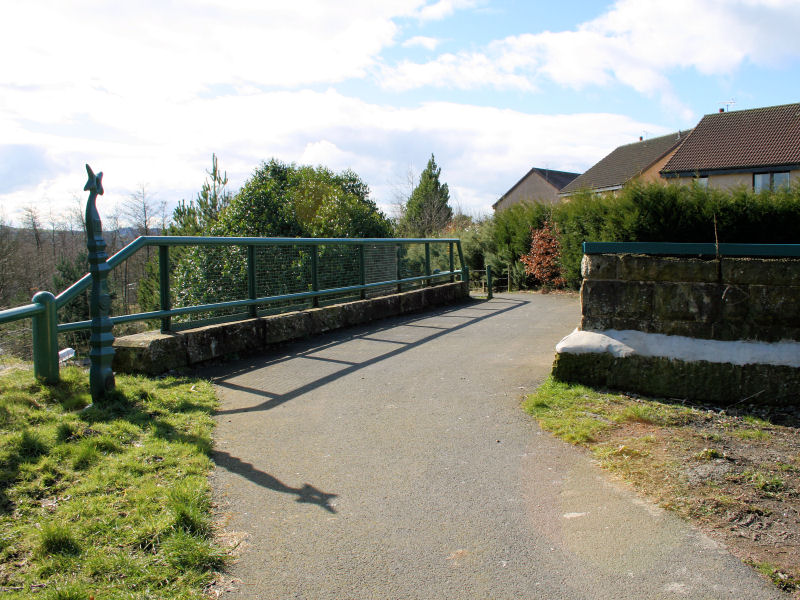
- The approach to Lochwinnoch looking west in 2008.

General information
- Location: Lochwinnoch, Renfrewshire; Scotland
- Coordinates: 55.7949°N 4.6248°W
- Grid reference: NS355588
- Platforms: 2

Other information
- Status: Disused

History
- Pre-grouping: Glasgow and South Western Railway
- Post-grouping: LMS

Key dates
- 1 June 1905: Opened
- 27 June 1966: Closed
Location

Lochwinnoch railway station was a railway station serving the village of Lochwinnoch, Renfrewshire, Scotland. The station was part of the Dalry and North Johnstone Line on the Glasgow and South Western Railway.

== History ==
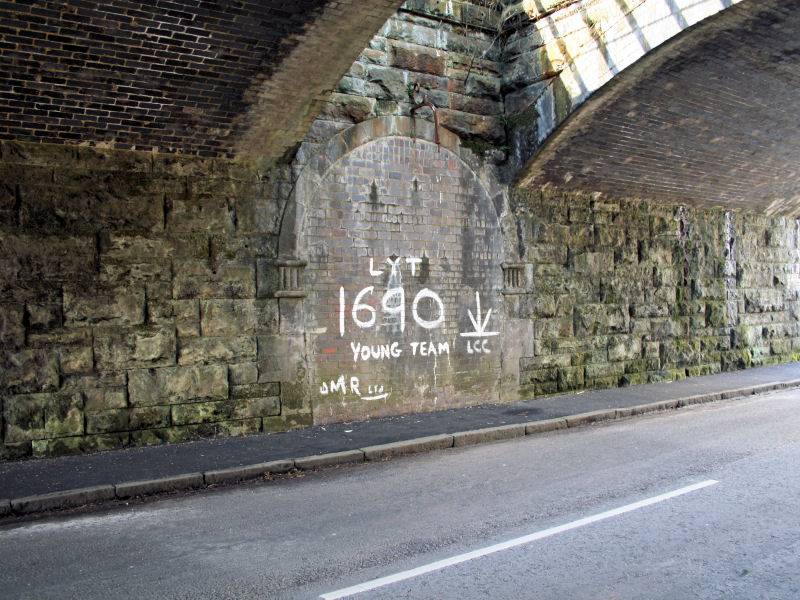
The bricked up passenger entrance in 2008.

The station opened on 1 June 1905, and closed to passengers on 27 June 1966. This station was located in the village on the north west side of Castle Semple Loch, being closer to the village centre than the original Lochwinnoch station (renamed Lochside during this station's lifetime) which is still located at the south east end of Castle Semple Loch.

Little remains of the station, although a bricked up entrance remains under a bridge. The station site is now occupied by housing, and the trackbed to the east and west is now part of National Cycle Route 7.

Preceding station	Historical railways	Following station
Kilbirnie; Line and station closed	Glasgow and South Western Railway; Dalry and North Johnstone Line	Castle Semple; Line closed; station never opened
