= Kilbarchan railway station =

Former railway station in Scotland

Kilbarchan
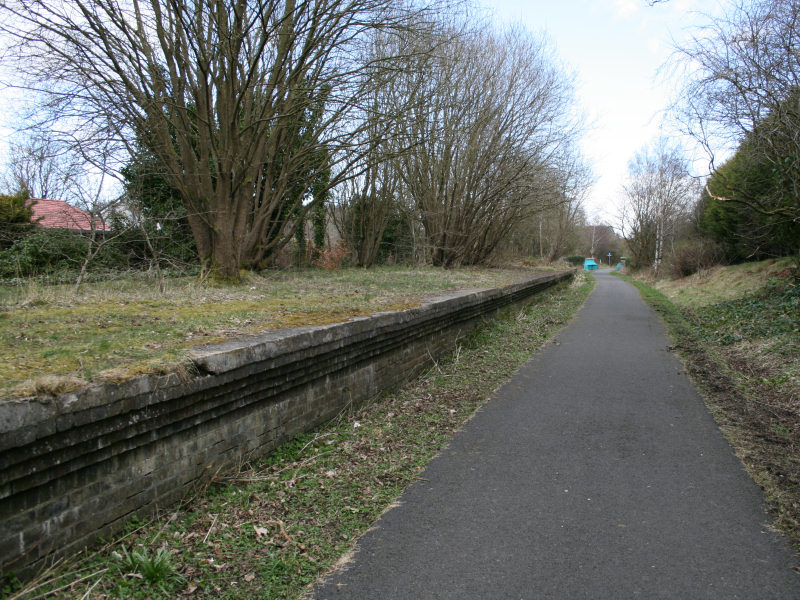
- The remains of Kilbarchan station in 2008.

General information
- Location: Kilbarchan, Renfrewshire; Scotland
- Coordinates: 55.8322°N 4.5446°W
- Grid reference: NS407628
- Platforms: 2

Other information
- Status: Disused

History
- Original company: Glasgow and South Western Railway
- Pre-grouping: Glasgow and South Western Railway
- Post-grouping: London, Midland and Scottish Railway

Key dates
- 1 June 1905: Opened
- 27 June 1966: Closed
Location

Kilbarchan railway station was a railway station serving the village of Kilbarchan, Renfrewshire, Scotland. The station was part of the Dalry and North Johnstone Line on the Glasgow and South Western Railway.

== History ==
The station opened on 1 June 1905, and closed to passengers on 27 June 1966. The station was originally an island platform covered by an overhanging glass canopy. Access to the station, was via two glazed brick lined entrance ramps at either end of the platform; one leading to the archway under the green bridges in the village's main thoroughfare High Barholm, and the other leading down to a minor road near the Tandlehill estate. When the station was built, several of the cottages in the street had to be cleared to make way for the station entrance, and the bridges over the street. The station's platform remains partially intact. However, the trackbed is now part of National Cycle Route 7. Both station passenger entrance ramps were re-opened for access to the cycle route.

== Gallery ==
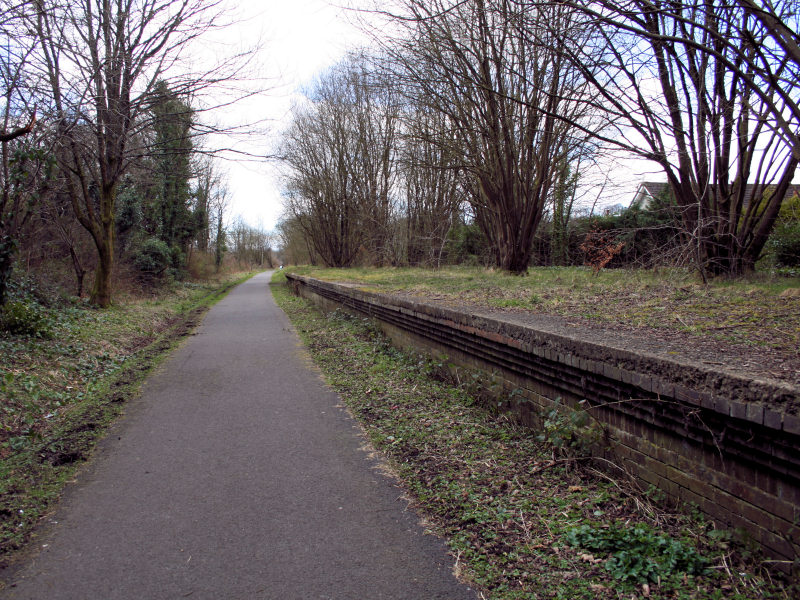
The remaining platform looking south-west in 2008.

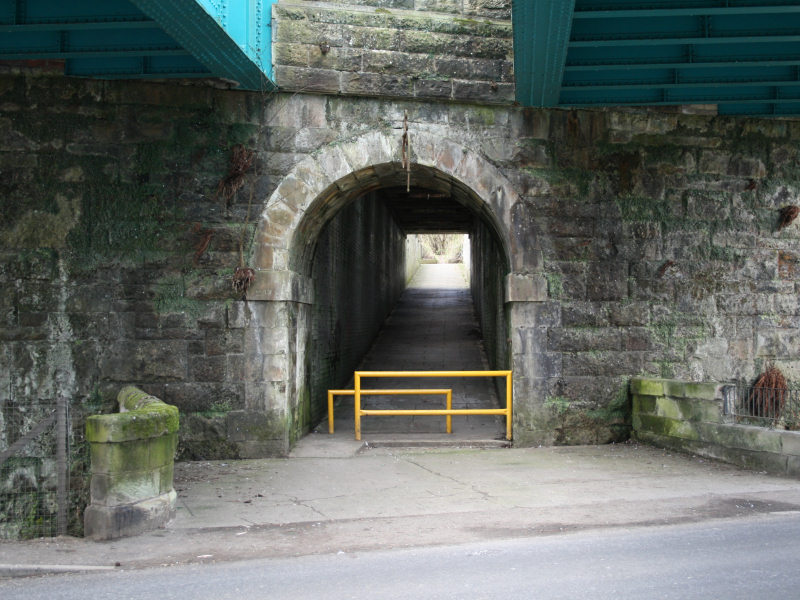
The north western street entrance to the station in 2008.

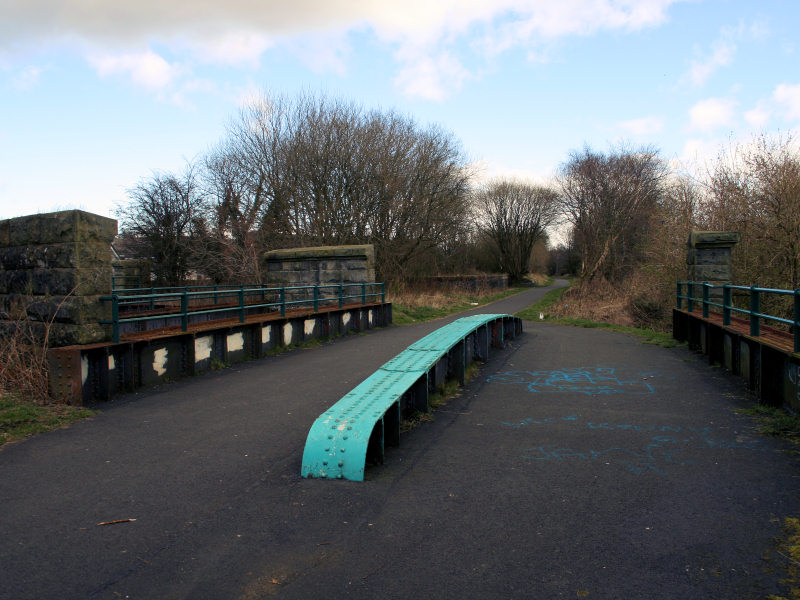
The approach to the station from the south-west in 2008.

| Preceding station | Historical railways | Following station |
|---|---|---|
| Castle Semple; Line closed; station never opened | Glasgow and South Western Railway; Dalry and North Johnstone Line | Johnstone North; Line and station closed |
