= Elderslie railway station =

Former railway station in Scotland

Elderslie
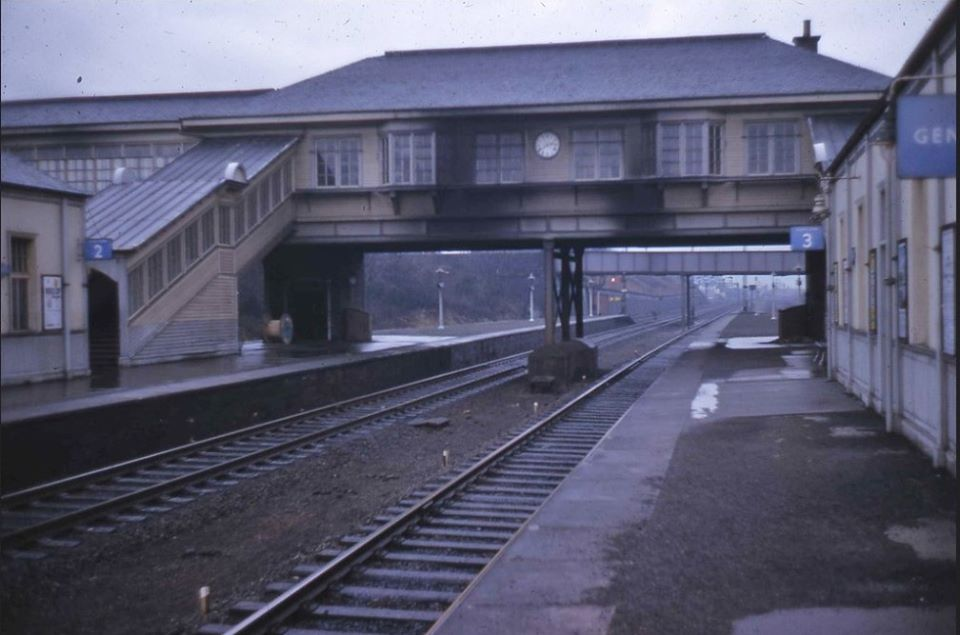
- Elderslie before its closure.

General information
- Location: Elderslie, Renfrewshire; Scotland
- Coordinates: 55.8387°N 4.4751°W
- Grid reference: NS450634
- Platforms: 4

Other information
- Status: Disused

History
- Original company: Glasgow, Paisley, Kilmarnock and Ayr Railway
- Pre-grouping: Glasgow and South Western Railway
- Post-grouping: LMS

Key dates
- 21 July 1840: Opened
- 14 February 1966: Closed
Location

Elderslie railway station was a railway station serving the west of Elderslie, Scotland, originally as part of the Glasgow, Paisley, Kilmarnock and Ayr Railway (now the Ayrshire Coast Line).

== History ==
The station opened on 21 July 1840. The station was grand in design, and had four platforms, with the station building extended out over the two central platforms. It had a covered walkway out into Elderslie Main Road. It was a busy railway intersection, as all mainline traffic from Glasgow - Ayr/Stranraer passed through it, as well as the Paisley Canal Line, the Dalry and North Johnstone Line, and the Bridge of Weir Railway. To the east of the station was Canal Junction, with the line dividing between the line to Glasgow via Paisley Gilmour Street and the line via Paisley Canal; whilst to the west a dive-under junction provided connections to the North Johnstone line and the line to Greenock Princes Pier, via Kilmacolm.

Elderslie station closed on 14 February 1966 and was demolished shortly after, however it remained a junction until the closure of the Paisley Canal Line through to Kilmacolm in 1983. Following the Ayrshire Coast Line electrification in 1986, an Up Passenger Loop remains, and the line to the south west is signalled for bi-directional working. All that remains of the station now is the bricked off entrance on the main road, which once led to the covered walkway, and a large brick abutment adjacent to the current Glasgow to Ayr line.

Preceding station	Historical railways	Following station
Houston; Line and station closed	Glasgow and South Western Railway; Bridge of Weir Railway	Connection with GPK&AR
Johnstone North; Line and station closed	Glasgow and South Western Railway; Dalry and North Johnstone Line	Connection with GPK&AR
Johnstone; Line and station open	Glasgow and South Western Railway; Glasgow, Paisley, Kilmarnock and Ayr Railway	Paisley Gilmour Street; Line and station open
Connection with GPK&AR	Glasgow and South Western Railway; Paisley Canal Line	Paisley West; Line and station closed
Connection with GPK&AR	Glasgow and South Western Railway; Barrhead Branch	Potterhill; Line and station closed
