= Kilbirnie railway station =

Former railway station in Scotland

Kilbirnie
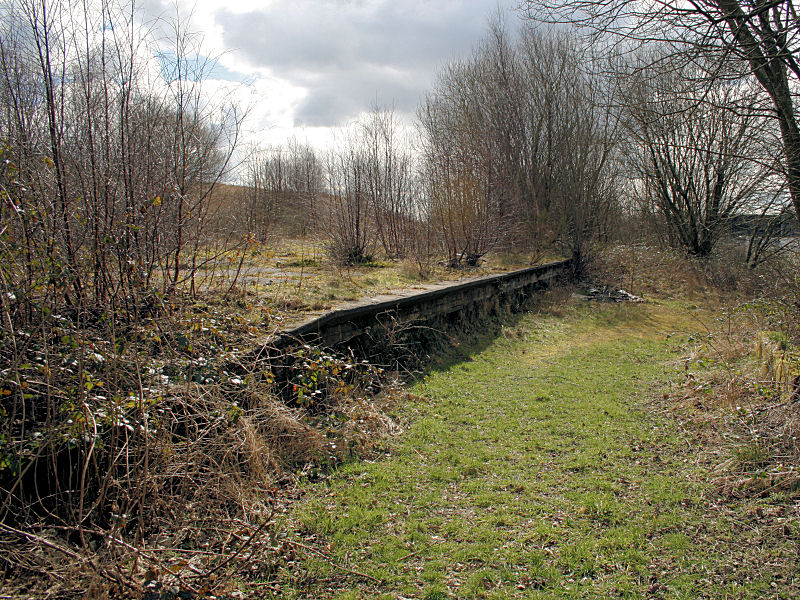
- The remains of Kilbirnie station in 2008.

General information
- Location: Kilbirnie, Ayrshire; Scotland
- Coordinates: 55.7553°N 4.6782°W
- Grid reference: NS320545
- Platforms: 2

Other information
- Status: Disused

History
- Pre-grouping: Glasgow and South Western Railway
- Post-grouping: London, Midland and Scottish Railway

Key dates
- 1 June 1905: Opened
- 27 June 1966: Closed
Location

Kilbirnie railway station was a railway station serving the town of Kilbirnie, North Ayrshire, Scotland. The station was part of the Dalry and North Johnstone Line on the Glasgow and South Western Railway.

== History ==
The station opened on 1 June 1905, and closed to passengers on 27 June 1966. The station's island platform remains in place and intact, however the trackbed is now part of National Cycle Route 7.

Preceding station	Historical railways	Following station
Dalry; Line closed; station open	Glasgow and South Western Railway; Dalry and North Johnstone Line	Lochwinnoch; Line and station closed
