= Johnston Station =

Johnston Station may refer to:

- Johnston railway station, Johnston, Pembrokeshire, Wales
- Original name of Ludowici, Georgia, United States

== See also ==
- Johnstone railway station, Johnstone, Renfrewshire, Scotland
- Johnstone North railway station, Johnstone, Renfrewshire, Scotland closed 1955
