= Castle Semple railway station =

Proposed railway station in Scotland

Castle Semple
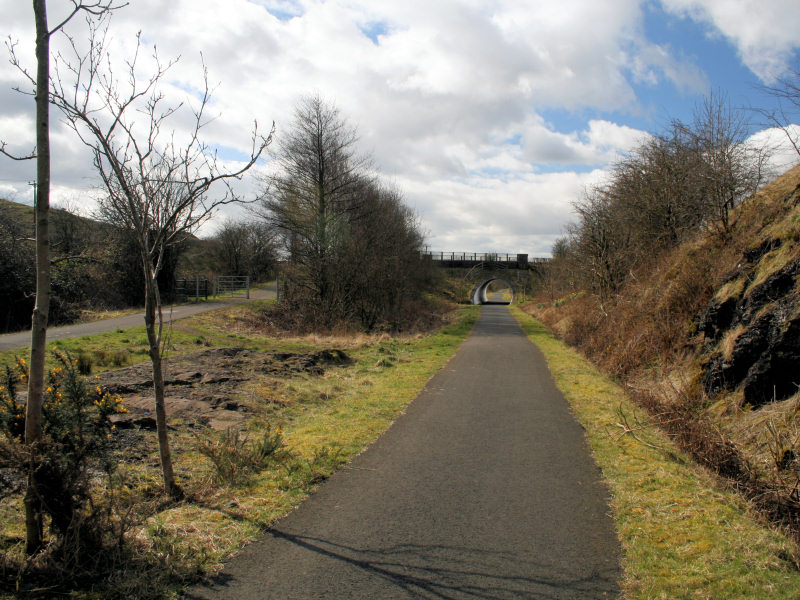
- The intended site of the station in 2008

General information
- Location: Near Howwood, Renfrewshire; Scotland
- Coordinates: 55.8138°N 4.5740°W
- Grid reference: NS388608

Other information
- Status: Disused

History
- Pre-grouping: Glasgow and South Western Railway

Key dates
- N/A: Never opened

Castle Semple railway station was intended to be a railway station that would have served the village of Howwood, Renfrewshire, Scotland, as part of the Dalry and North Johnstone Line on the Glasgow and South Western Railway.

== History ==
This station never opened. The proposed location of the station was a short distance north east of Castle Semple Loch, where a widening on the former railway line is still visible. A platform did exist here, used by the workers of the nearby Castle Semple Estate. Had the station opened to the general public, it would likely have been called Howwood or St Bryde's (after nearby St Bryde's House and burn). The trackbed is now part of National Cycle Route 7.

Preceding station	Historical railways	Following station
Lochwinnoch; Line and station closed	Glasgow and South Western Railway; Dalry and North Johnstone Line	Kilbarchan; Line and station closed
