= Johnstone North railway station =

Former railway station in Scotland

Johnstone North

General information
- Location: Johnstone, Renfrewshire; Scotland
- Coordinates: 55.8399°N 4.5143°W
- Grid reference: NS426636
- Platforms: 2

Other information
- Status: Disused

History
- Original company: Glasgow and South Western Railway
- Pre-grouping: Glasgow and South Western Railway
- Post-grouping: LMS

Key dates
- 1 June 1905: Opened
- 7 March 1955: Closed
Location

Johnstone North railway station was a railway station serving the town of Johnstone, Renfrewshire, Scotland as part of the Dalry and North Johnstone Line on the Glasgow and South Western Railway.

== History ==
The station opened on 1 June 1905. An earlier terminus station, also called Johnstone North, on the Paisley Canal Line had operated nearby in 1896, but the opening of the Kilbarchan Loop made it redundant and so this station was built as a replacement. The station closed to passengers on 7 March 1955.

To the east of the station was Cart Junction with the Bridge of Weir Railway, and onwards to the triangular junction with the Glasgow, Paisley, Kilmarnock and Ayr Railway.

The overbridge to the west of the station was removed as part of the construction associated with the Johnstone and Kilbarchan bypass (A737 road) in the early 1990s.

In 2006-07 the site was flattened to make way for a new Morrisons Superstore.

Preceding station	Historical railways	Following station
Kilbarchan; Line and station closed	Glasgow and South Western Railway; Dalry and North Johnstone Line / Bridge of Weir Railway	Elderslie; Line and station closed
Kilbarchan; Line and station closed	Glasgow and South Western Railway; Dalry and North Johnstone Line / Bridge of Weir Railway	Johnstone; Line closed, station open
