= Houston railway station (Scotland) =

Former railway station in Scotland

Houston
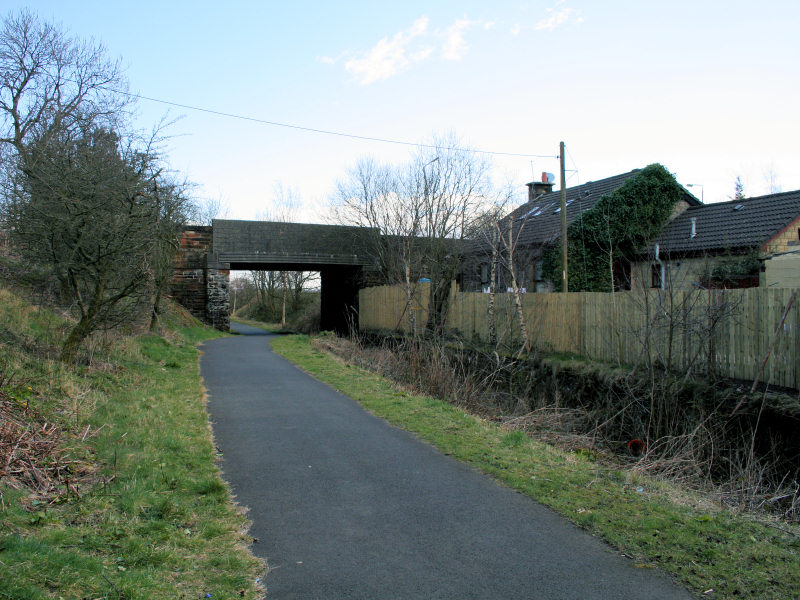
- Houston station building and platform in 2008

General information
- Location: Houston and Killellan, Renfrewshire; Scotland
- Coordinates: 55.8484°N 4.5235°W
- Grid reference: NS421645
- Platforms: 2

Other information
- Status: Disused

History
- Original company: Glasgow and South Western Railway
- Pre-grouping: Glasgow and South Western Railway
- Post-grouping: LMS

Key dates
- 3 April 1871: Opened as Windyhill
- May 1871: Renamed Crosslee
- 1 January 1874: Renamed Houston
- 1 January 1875: Renamed Houston (Crosslee)
- June 1926: Renamed Houston and Crosslee
- 7 May 1973: Renamed Houston
- 10 January 1983: Closed
Location

Houston railway station was a railway station serving the villages of Brookfield and Houston, Renfrewshire, Scotland, originally as part of the Bridge of Weir Railway and later part of the Glasgow and South Western Railway.

== History ==
The station opened on 3 April 1871 and was known as Windyhill. It was soon renamed Crosslee in May of the same year, and then renamed Houston on 1 January 1874. It was renamed Houston (Crosslee) exactly one year later on 1 January 1875, and then later renamed Houston and Crosslee.

Preceding station	Historical railways	Following station
Bridge of Weir; Line and station closed	Glasgow and South Western Railway; Bridge of Weir Railway	Elderslie; Line and station closed
Bridge of Weir; Line and station closed	Glasgow and South Western Railway; Bridge of Weir Railway	Johnstone; Line closed; station open

== Closure ==
It was finally renamed back to Houston on 7 May 1973, however the station closed on 10 January 1983.

A single platform remains on site, the station building which had been private residence was demolished in 2021.
