= Bridge of Weir railway station =

Disused railway station in Scotland

Coordinates: 55.85466°N 4.57159°W

Bridge of Weir
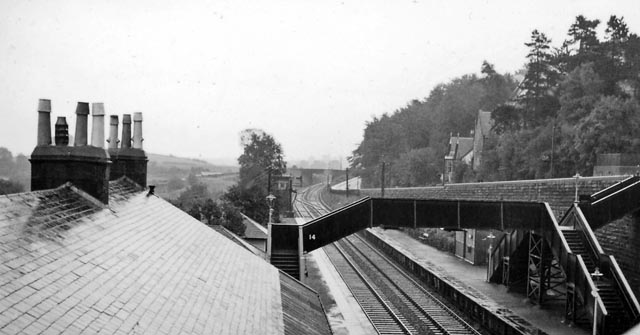
- Bridge of Weir station in 1961

General information
- Location: Bridge of Weir, Renfrewshire; Scotland
- Platforms: 2

Other information
- Status: Disused

History
- Original company: Bridge of Weir Railway
- Pre-grouping: Glasgow and South Western Railway
- Post-grouping: LMS

Key dates
- 20 June 1864: Opened
- 18 May 1868: Closed during construction of the Greenock and Ayrshire Railway
- 23 December 1869: Reopened as a through station
- 10 January 1983: Closed
Location

Bridge of Weir railway station was a railway station serving the village of Bridge of Weir, Renfrewshire, Scotland, originally as part of the Bridge of Weir Railway.

== History ==
The station opened on 1 June 1864, however it was closed on 18 May 1868 during the construction of the Greenock and Ayrshire Railway. It reopened, now as part of the new extended line, on 23 December 1869. The station closed on 10 January 1983.

Preceding station	Historical railways	Following station
End of Line; Through services via G&AR	Glasgow and South Western Railway; Bridge of Weir Railway	Houston; Line and station closed
Kilmacolm; Line and station closed	Glasgow and South Western Railway; Greenock and Ayrshire Railway	End of Line; Through services via BWR
