= Alexander McLachlan =

Alexander McLachlan may refer to:

- Alexander McLachlan (politician)
- Alexander McLachlan (poet)
