= Johnstone railway station =

Railway station in Renfrewshire, Scotland

Johnstone Scottish Gaelic: Baile Iain
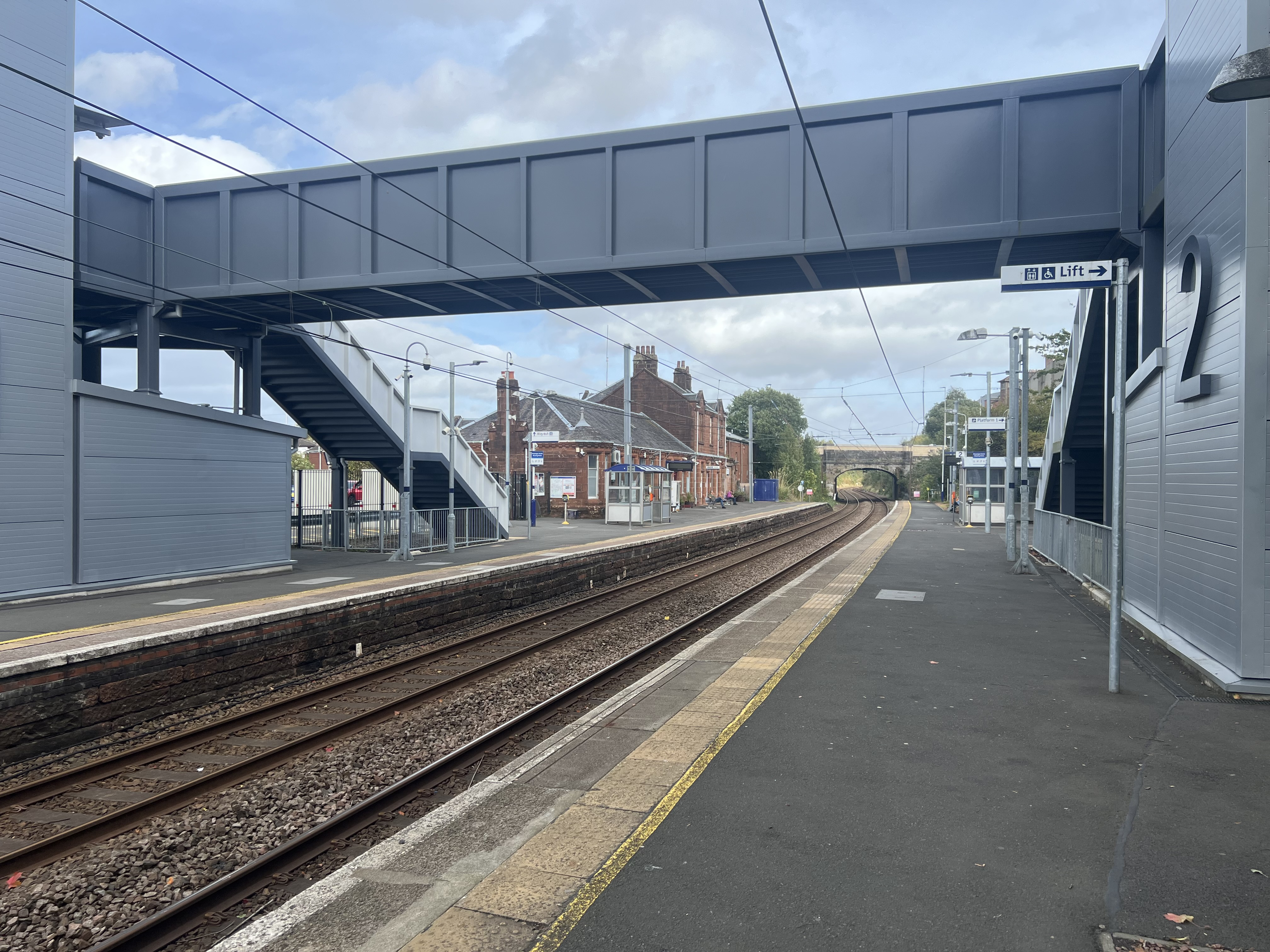

General information
- Location: Johnstone, Renfrewshire; Scotland
- Coordinates: 55.8343°N 4.5032°W
- Grid reference: NS432629
- Manager: ScotRail
- Transit authority: SPT
- Platforms: 2

Other information
- Station code: JHN

History
- Original company: Glasgow, Paisley, Kilmarnock and Ayr Railway
- Pre-grouping: Glasgow and South Western Railway
- Post-grouping: LMS

Key dates
- 21 July 1840: Opened
- 18 June 1955: Renamed Johnstone High
- 10 September 1962: Renamed Johnstone

Passengers
- 2021/22: ▲0.637 million
- 2022/23: ▲0.821 million
- 2023/24: ▲1.086 million
- 2024/25: ▲1.140 million
- 2025/26: ▲1.158 million
Location
Notes
- Passenger statistics from the Office of Rail and Road

Johnstone (Strathclyde) railway station serves the town of Johnstone, Renfrewshire, Scotland. The station is managed by ScotRail and is on the Ayrshire Coast Line 10 3/4 miles (17.3 km) south west of Glasgow Central. Johnstone has no ticket gates.

== History ==
The station was opened on 21 July 1840 by the Glasgow, Paisley, Kilmarnock and Ayr Railway. The station was renamed Johnstone High on 18 June 1955, however its original name was restored on 10 September 1962. Just to the east of the station there was a junction connecting to the Bridge of Weir Railway.

In the 1960s it was the location of a car loading facility for vehicles manufactured at the Linwood Car Plant.

== Facilities ==
The station has one of ten remaining ticket offices on the Ayrshire Coast Line, and a Scheidt & Bachmann Ticket XPress self-service ticket machine was installed on Platform 1 in 2007. Both platforms are accessible to wheelchair users, and seven of the 282 spaces in the car park are allocated to disabled drivers.

== Services ==
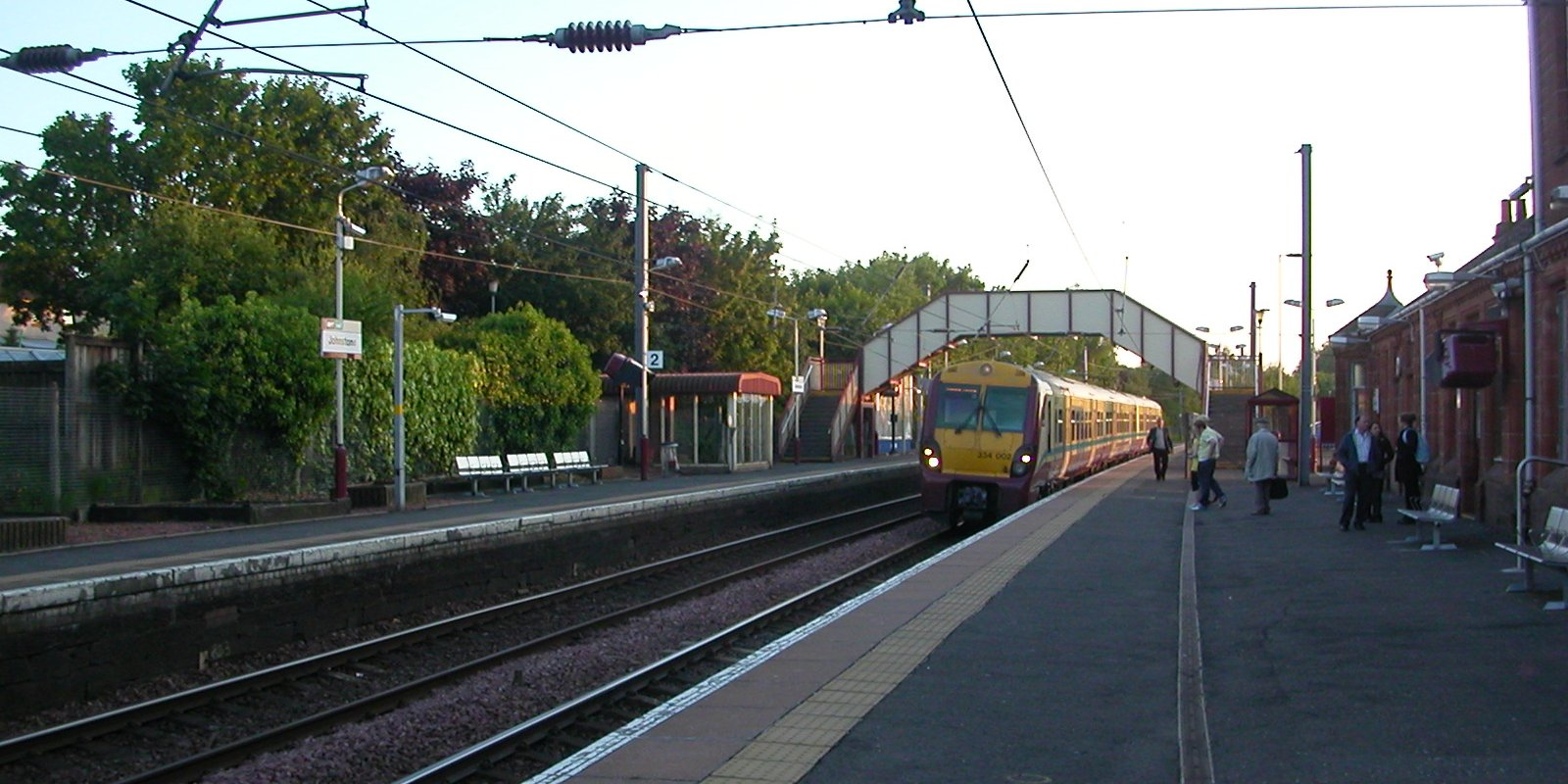
Johnstone station in June 2007

=== 1980 ===
Monday to Friday there were two trains per hour to Ayr (one being limited stop), some of which were extended to Girvan and Stranraer Harbour. There was one train per hour to Largs. Additional trains ran to Ardrossan Winton Pier to connect with the ferry to Brodick.

=== 2013 ===
Monday to Saturday daytimes, four trains per hour go eastbound to Glasgow Central. Westbound there are two trains per hour to Irvine, one of which continues to Ayr; there are also hourly services to both Ardrossan and Largs.

=== 2016 ===
The Glasgow service remains unchanged from 2013, but there are now 2tph through to Ayr in addition to the hourly trains to Ardrossan Harbour & Largs. On Sundays, there are 2tph to Ayr and hourly trains to Largs, with 3tph to Glasgow.

Preceding station	National Rail	Following station
Milliken Park or Kilwinning	ScotRail; Ayrshire Coast Line	Paisley Gilmour Street
	Historical railways	
Connection with GPK&AR	Glasgow and South Western Railway; Bridge of Weir Railway	Houston; Line and station closed
Connection with GPK&AR	Glasgow and South Western Railway; Dalry and North Johnstone Line	Johnstone North; Line and station closed
Milliken Park; Line and station open	Glasgow and South Western Railway; Glasgow, Paisley, Kilmarnock and Ayr Railway	Elderslie; Line open; station closed
