= Milliken Park railway station =

Railway station in Renfrewshire, Scotland

Milliken Park Scottish Gaelic: Pàirc Mhaolagain
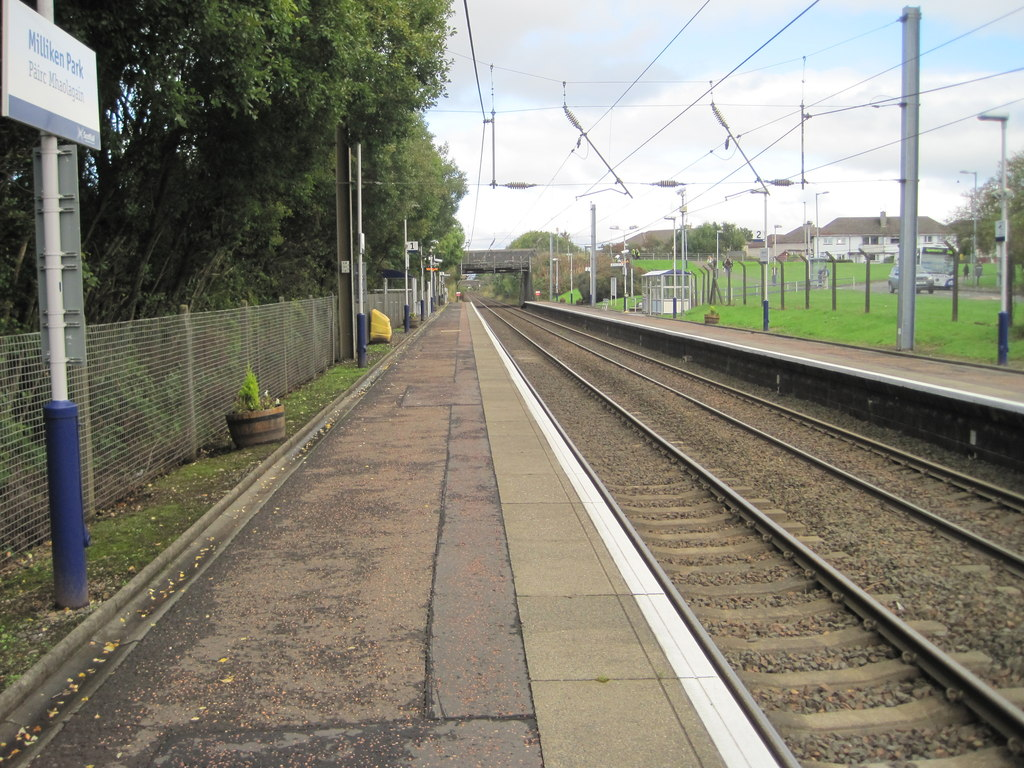
- Milliken Park station in 2013.

General information
- Location: Kilbarchan, Renfrewshire; Scotland
- Coordinates: 55.8247°N 4.5344°W
- Grid reference: NS413620
- Manager: ScotRail
- Transit authority: SPT
- Platforms: 2

Other information
- Station code: MIN

History
- Original company: Glasgow, Paisley, Kilmarnock and Ayr Railway
- Pre-grouping: Glasgow and South Western Railway
- Post-grouping: LMS

Key dates
- 21 July 1840: Opened as Cochrane Mill
- 1 March 1853: Renamed Milliken Park
- 18 April 1966: Original station closed
- 15 May 1989: New station opened

Passengers
- 2021/22: ▲0.127 million
- 2022/23: ▲0.161 million
- 2023/24: ▲0.188 million
- 2024/25: ▲0.196 million
- 2025/26: ▲0.210 million
Location
Notes
- Passenger statistics from the Office of Rail and Road

Milliken Park railway station serves the west end of Johnstone and the south west of the village of Kilbarchan in Renfrewshire, Scotland. The station is managed by ScotRail and is on the Ayrshire Coast Line.

== History ==
The original Milliken Park station was opened on 21 July 1840 by the Glasgow, Paisley, Kilmarnock and Ayr Railway and was known as Cochrane Mill. The station was renamed Milliken Park on 1 March 1853 and closed to passengers on 18 April 1966. The site of this station's goods yard is now a bus depot. The signal box remained in use until it was destroyed by fire in an act of vandalism on 1 March 1978.

The current station opened on 15 May 1989, by British Rail to the south west of the original on the other side of new Cochranemill Road bridge (built in 1974–5) next to the Corseford Housing Estate. Provision for the station had been made in the siting and construction of the overhead electrification equipment.

== Facilities ==
The station has neither car park nor ticket office, however, there is a ticket machine situated within the shelter of platform 1. There are also six cycle stands available.

== Services ==
The Glasgow - Ayr stopping trains call here every 30 minutes off-peak (Monday to Saturday), with extra services at peak times. In the evening, there is an hourly service each way (with westbound trains to Ardrossan Harbour and also on Sundays to/from Largs).

| Preceding station | National Rail | Following station |
|---|---|---|
| Howwood | ScotRail; Ayrshire Coast Line | Johnstone |
| | Historical railways | |
| Howwood; Line and station open | Glasgow and South Western Railway; Glasgow, Paisley, Kilmarnock and Ayr Railway | Johnstone; Line and station open |
