= Wallace Oak (Elderslie) =

Historic oak tree

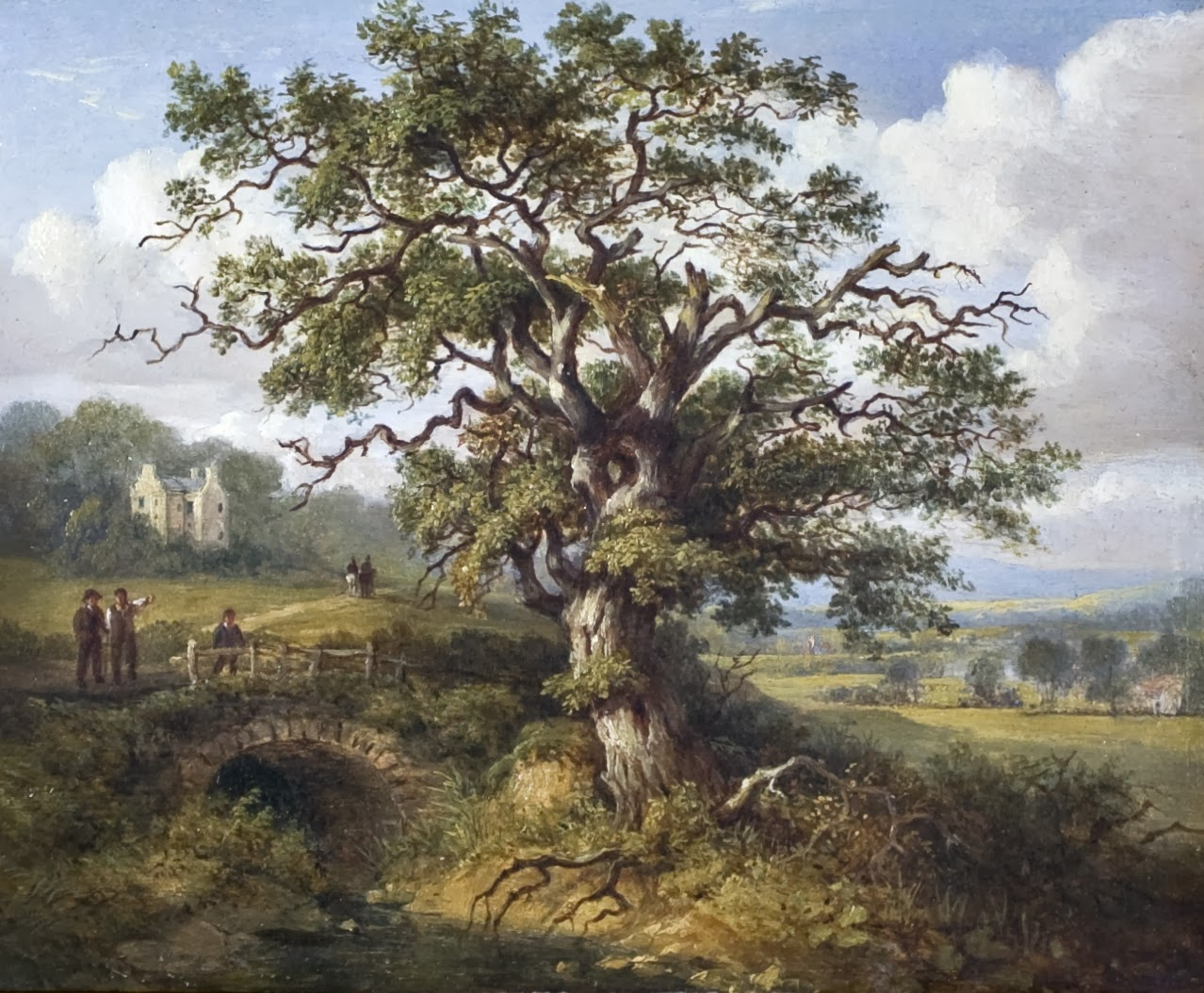
- Jane Nasmyth's painting of the oak, c. 1850
- Location: Elderslie, Renfrewshire
- Date seeded: circa 1100 AD
- Date felled: 1856

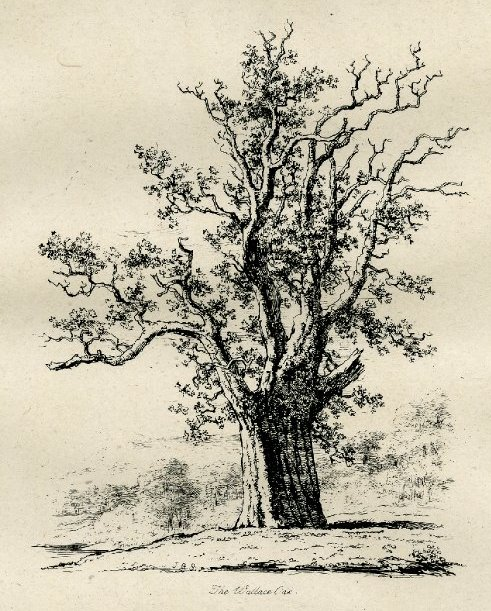
JG Strutt's Wallace Oak 1851

The Wallace Oak was an oak tree that stood in Elderslie, Renfrewshire. It is reputed to have seeded around 1100 and by the late 13th century grew on the estate of Scottish independence leader William Wallace's father. Wallace is reputed to have hidden himself within the tree to escape from English soldiers. The tree was damaged by the removal of wood to make souvenirs in the 19th century and it fell during a storm in 1856.

== Association with Wallace ==
The oak is described as being at least 700 years old in a book of 1838, giving an approximate seeding date of 1100 AD. The tree stood at the west end of the village of Elderslie in Renfrewshire, to the north of the turnpike road. By the late 13th century the tree came into the ownership of the father of Scottish independence leader William Wallace. William Wallace himself is said to have been born on the estate associated with the oak.

In legend, Wallace is said to have used the branches of the tree to hide from an English patrol. This legend later became more outlandish, with it being stated that the tree hid 300 of Wallace's men. Its canopy has been variously described as covering 413 square metres (0.102 acres) and a Scottish acre (1.3 acres; 0.53 ha).

The tree was well known by the 14th century and the Wallace Yew later grew next to it.

== 19th century ==
In 1825 the trunk was measured at 21 feet (6.4 m) in circumference at ground level, reducing to 12 feet 2 inches (3.71 m) at a height of 5 feet (1.5 m) from the ground. It measured 67 feet (20 m) in height with branches extending up to 45 feet (14 m) to give a canopy covering 19 English square poles of land (574.75 square yards; 480.56 m^{2}).

After this time the tree declined, partly due to age and partly due to parts of it being removed as souvenirs. By the mid-19th century it had become common for Scottish men to own a snuff box that incorporated a fragment of the Wallace Oak together with part of a tree said to have been planted by Mary, Queen of Scots at Holyrood Palace, part of another tree under which she is said to have watched the Battle of Langside and a portion of the rafters of Alloway Auld Kirk (made famous by Robert Burns).

By 1851, Jacob George Strutt drew it for his Sylva Britannica, many of its branches had been removed and it was described as "a melancholy torso, bald and frail, with its limbs hacked off by relic hunters, like Wallace's by the hangman". The tree fell during a storm in 1856. Its timber was reputedly used to make two regency-style tables. John McAdam commissioned an elaborate frame made from the oak in 1867 which he intended to be used to contain letters about Wallace at the National Wallace Monument. Acorns from the Oak were raised to saplings by Daniel Johnston Baron Officer at the Elderslie Estate; one of the saplings was planted at Fountain Gardens in Paisley where it still stands.
