= Howwood railway station =

Railway station in Renfrewshire, Scotland

Howwood
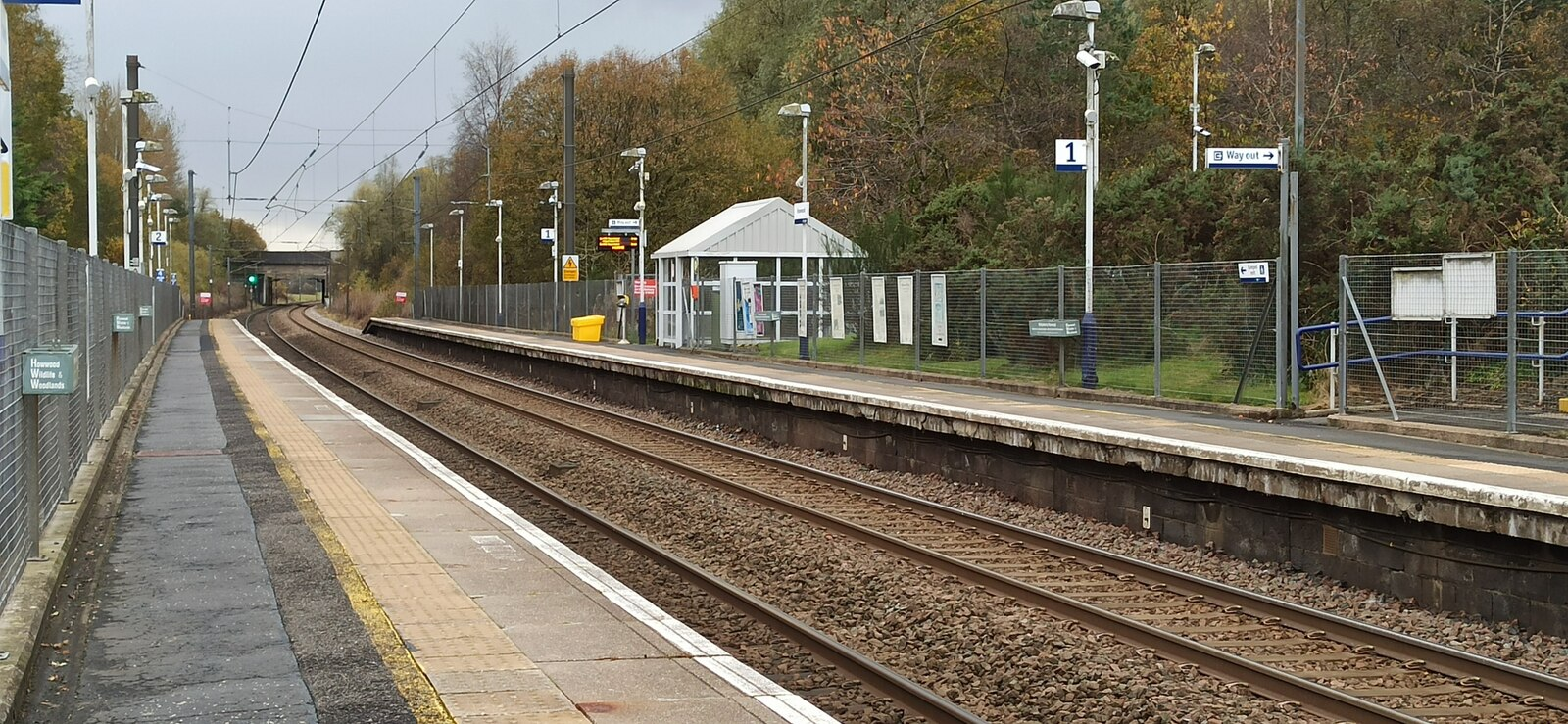
- Howwood station in 2023

General information
- Location: Howwood, Renfrewshire; Scotland
- Coordinates: 55.8106°N 4.5625°W
- Grid reference: NS395604
- Manager: ScotRail
- Transit authority: SPT
- Platforms: 2

Other information
- Station code: HOZ

History
- Original company: Glasgow, Paisley, Kilmarnock and Ayr Railway
- Pre-grouping: Glasgow and South Western Railway
- Post-grouping: LMS

Key dates
- 21 July 1840: Opened as Howood
- 11 August 1840: Closed
- 1 December 1876: Reopened and renamed Howwood
- 7 March 1955: Closed
- 12 March 2001: New station opened

Passengers
- 2021/22: ▲40,402
- 2022/23: ▲55,720
- 2023/24: ▲71,226
- 2024/25: ▲75,126
- 2025/26: ▲76,732
Location
Notes
- Passenger statistics from the Office of Rail and Road

Howwood railway station is a railway station serving the village of Howwood, Renfrewshire, Scotland. The station is managed by ScotRail and is on the Ayrshire Coast Line, 13 miles (21 km) south west of Glasgow Central.

== History ==
The original Howwood station was opened on 21 July 1840 by the Glasgow, Paisley, Kilmarnock and Ayr Railway and was known as Howood. The station had a very short life and closed just over two weeks later on 11 August 1840. A new station called Howwood was opened on 1 December 1876, 200 metres (220 yd) southwest of the original, and closed on 7 March 1955.

The current station opened on 12 March 2001, on the same site as the 1876 station. It has a 24-hour station car park with 30 spaces.

== Services ==
=== 2016 service pattern ===
There is a half-hourly service at the station. Trains run from Ayr-Glasgow Central, calling at all stops between Glasgow and Ayr. This drops to hourly in the evening and on Sundays, when trains run to either Ardrossan Harbour or Largs.

Preceding station	National Rail	Following station
Lochwinnoch	ScotRail; Ayrshire Coast Line	Milliken Park
	Historical railways	
Lochwinnoch; Line and station open	Glasgow and South Western Railway; Glasgow, Paisley, Kilmarnock and Ayr Railway	Milliken Park; Line and station open
