= Wallace Yew =

Tree in Scotland

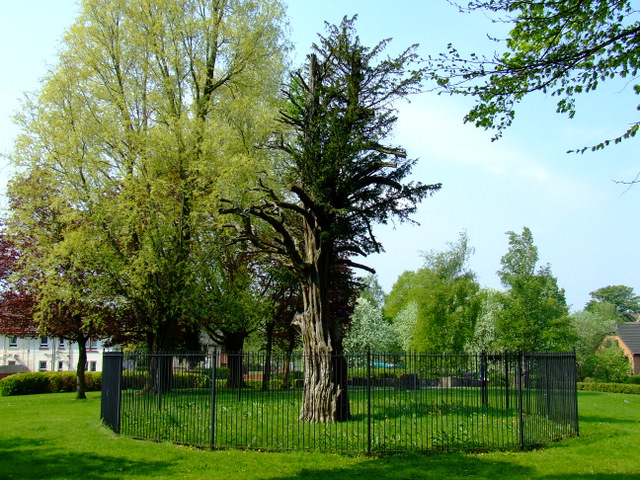
- The Wallace Yew in 2011
- Interactive map of Wallace Yew
- Location: Elderslie, Renfrewshire
- Coordinates: 55.8353°N 4.4886°W

The Wallace Yew is a tree in Elderslie, Renfrewshire in Scotland. It stands on grassland said to be near the home of medieval Scottish leader William Wallace. In legend, Wallace is said to have hidden in its branches to escape an English patrol. The tree is noted in parish records as early as the 18th century and still stands in 2019. In more recent times, it has been damaged by fire and storms and is now dying of a Ganoderma fungus infection. The Renfrewshire Council has taken cuttings of the tree to be grown as a replacement.

== History ==
The Wallace Yew is said to date back to the time of medieval Scottish independence leader William Wallace and to have been planted by him. This would make the tree some 700 years old. Doubts have been raised about the 700-year claim, though parish records from the 1700s record the presence of the yew which is described as "this ancient tree". The tree stands on a patch of grassland which is said to be near the site of Wallace's home and birthplace. In legend the tree is said to have sheltered Wallace from a patrol of English soldiers who were searching for him.

The tree is described in a book of 1857 as bearing "the mark of great age", though the writer notes that it was still in good health and "supporting a progeny of spreading branches". A 1912 work described the Wallace Yew as being more than 600 years old and playing a key role in preserving the association of Wallace's name with the village; this being a period between the felling of the Wallace Oak and the erection of a granite monument to Wallace.

== Decline and replacement ==
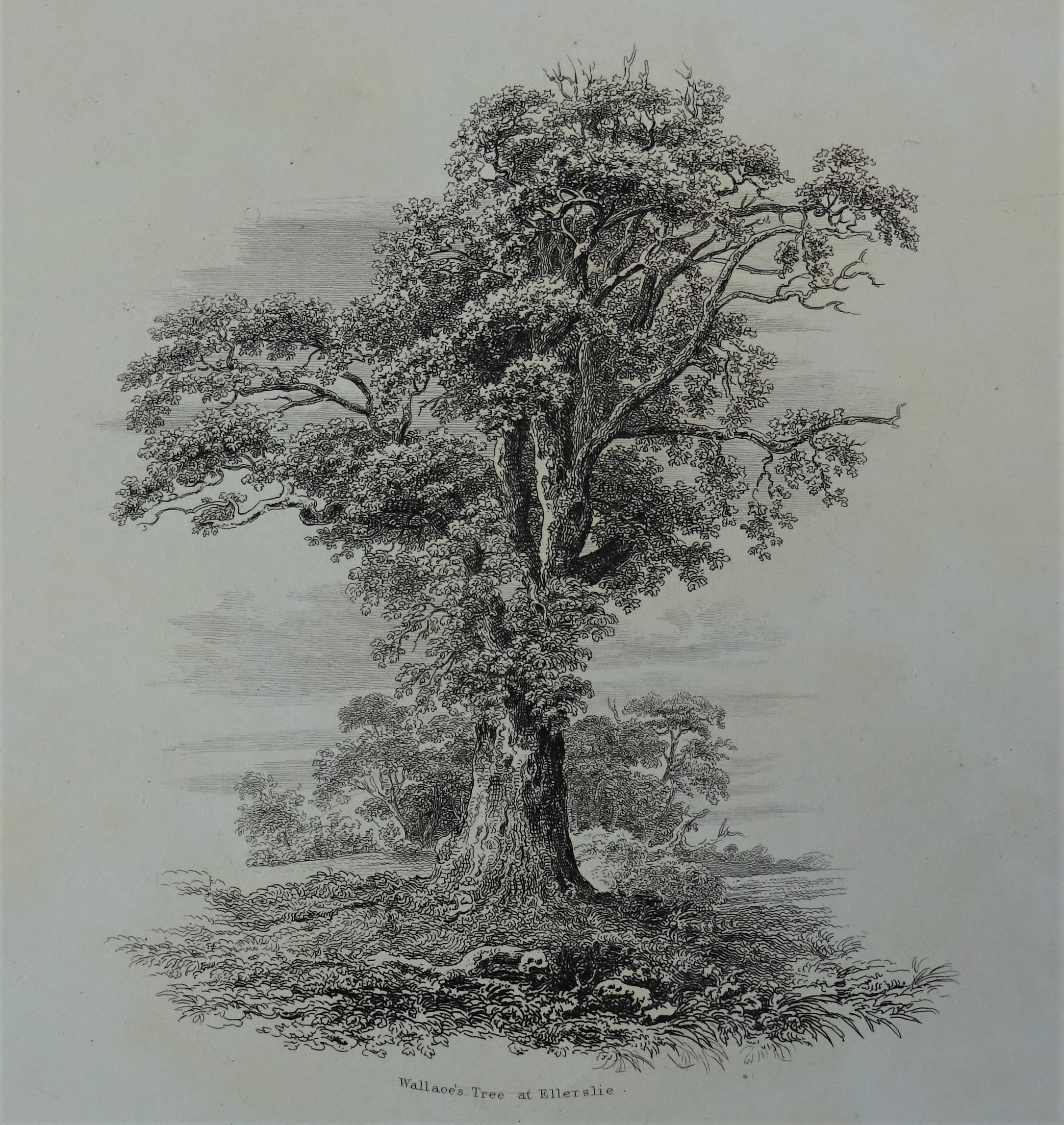
Wallace's Yew in 1839

The Wallace Yew was damaged by an arson attack in 1978 and again by storms in 2005. This left the tree open to infection by the untreatable Ganoderma fungus, which took hold by 2008 and will lead to eventual death. A Conservation Foundation campaign to save Scotland's yew trees was launched at the Wallace Yew in 2002 by botanist David Bellamy.

The tree, which at one point measured 35 feet (11 m) in height, was still standing by 2018. Renfrewshire Council took twelve cuttings from the tree with the intention of growing a replacement - these will all be clones of the original. Six of these cuttings successfully propagated and had reached around 45 centimetres (18 in) in height by 2008. One of the replacement trees, which will take 30 years to reach maturity, will be selected and planted near to the site of the Wallace Yew to replace it.

Another tree of the same name stood near to Elcho Castle near Perth.
