= Alexander McLachlan (poet) =

Scottish-born Canadian poet (1818–1896)

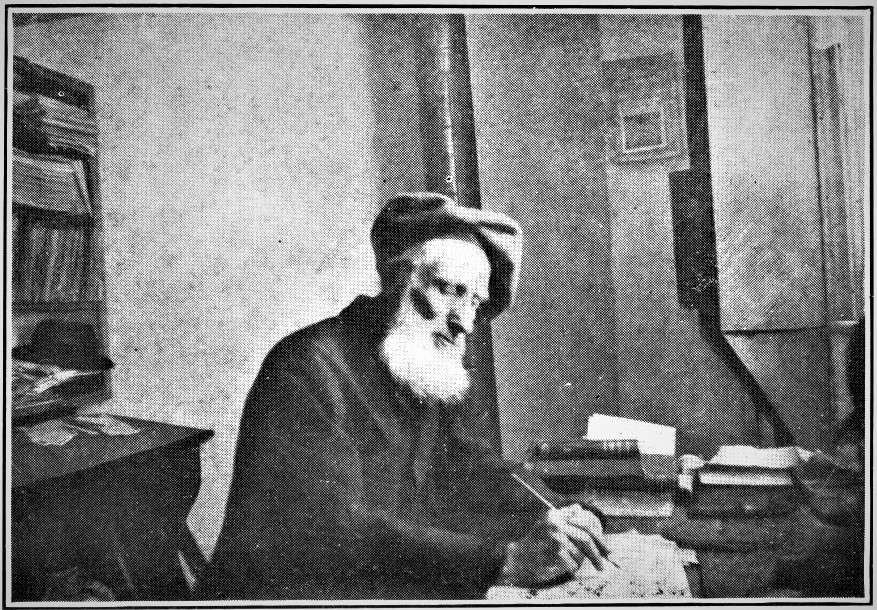
- Born: 1818; Johnstone, Scotland
- Died: 1896 (aged 77–78); Orangeville, Ontario, Canada
- Occupations: Poet, farmer
- Writing career
- Language: English
- Years active: 1846–1874
- Notable works: The Emigrant and Other Poems

Alexander McLachlan (1818–1896) was a Scottish-born Canadian poet who was active in the mid-nineteenth century and wrote in both Scottish dialect and poetic convention of the homesickness of Scottish immigrants to Canada. Both his contemporary and later critics have called him "the Canadian Robert Burns", after a Scottish national poet who also authored Scottish traditional verse. McLachlan's bound verse includes the titles The Spirit of Love (1846), Lyrics (1858), The Emigrant (1861) and Poems and Songs (1871).

McLachlan was born in Johnstone, Scotland, to Charles McLachlan and Jean Sutherland. In 1820, his father immigrated to Canada and settled in Caledon Township on 100 acres (40 ha) of land, leaving his family in Scotland. At some point in the 1830s, he died, leaving Alexander his land. McLachlan immigrated in 1840. One year later he married his cousin Clamina, and went on to have eleven children.

== Works available in classic reprint ==
- Alexander McLachlan, Lyrics, Kessinger Publishing, LLC, 2007 ISBN 978-0548623374
- Alexander McLachlan, The Emigrant and Other Poems, Forgotten Books, 2012 ASIN: B008522B64
- Alexander McLachlan, Poetical Works [The Poetical Works of Alexander McLachlan (1900)], selected and edited with introd. biographical sketch, notes and glossary, Ulan Press, 2012, ASN: B00AE60W7M
