= Elderslie, Renfrewshire =

Village in Renfrewshire, Scotland

Coordinates: 55.83061°N 4.48421°W

Elderslie: Scottish Gaelic: Achadh na Feàrna
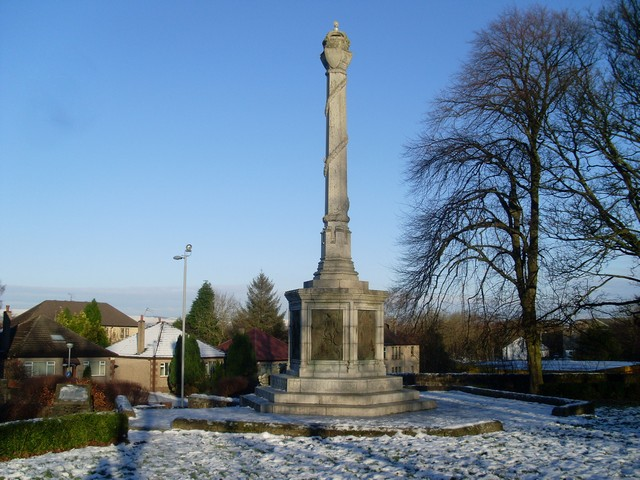
- Wallace Monument

- Location within Renfrewshire
- Population: 5,480 (2020)
- OS grid reference: NS445625
- Council area: Renfrewshire
- Lieutenancy area: Renfrewshire
- Country: Scotland
- Sovereign state: United Kingdom
- Post town: JOHNSTONE
- Postcode district: PA5
- Dialling code: 01505
- Police: Scotland
- Fire: Scottish
- Ambulance: Scottish
- UK Parliament: Paisley and Renfrewshire South
- Scottish Parliament: Renfrewshire South West Scotland

Elderslie (Scottish Gaelic: Achadh na Feàrna) is a village in the council area and historic county of Renfrewshire in west central Scotland. It chiefly serves as a commuter village, situated midway between the towns of Paisley and Johnstone, and lies 11 miles (18 km) west of Glasgow city centre.

Elderslie is most famous as the assumed birthplace of Scottish hero Sir William Wallace, a knight born around 1270 who served as a military leader in the Wars of Scottish Independence before being captured and executed. There is a monument to him in the village, alongside what is believed to be his home.

== History ==
The origin of the name of "Elderslie" is Old English for "field of Elder Trees".

It is assumed that William Wallace was born and grew up in Elderslie. On the site of the ancient Elderslie Castle there stands a monument to commemorate his life, and a commemoration ceremony is held every August. Also on the site is the Wallace Yew, an ancient yew tree and the Wallace Oak stood nearby until 1856. Auchenbathie Tower a few miles to the south is a site associated with William Wallace in an action against the English.

From 1862 until 2004 when the carpet firm merged operations in Kilmarnock only to go into receivership a year later the village was the home to Stoddard Carpets which made the carpets for the Cunard liners RMS Queen Mary, RMS Queen Elizabeth and Queen Elizabeth 2 which were built by John Brown & Company in their shipyard in Clydebank. The firm also produced carpets for Queen Elizabeth II's wedding in Westminster Abbey, the ocean liner RMS Titanic and for the Concorde aircraft. A remaining example of the work which was carried out here can be seen in the circular carpet which covers the floor of the drawing room in Culzean Castle designed by Robert Adam. Glenpatrick F.C., which took part in the Scottish Cup in the 1880s, may have been the works side of the Glenpatrick carpet works.

Elderslie railway station operated on the Glasgow, Paisley, Kilmarnock and Ayr Railway from 1840 to 1966.

== Education ==
There is one non-denominational state primary school in Elderslie: Wallace Primary School, which is a feeder school for Castlehead High School, a secondary school in Paisley.

== Landmarks ==
- William Wallace Monument and Wallace Yew
- Elderslie Kirk; Elderslie was once divided between two parishes of the established Church of Scotland, Elderslie West and Elderslie East, which amalgamated around 1977. Worshippers now meet in the former West church, renamed Elderslie Kirk.
- Old Patrick Water; The stream which runs through the village, colloquially known as the Brandy Burn
- There is a golf club called Elderslie Golf Club and a bowling club.
- Alleged home of William Wallace

== Notable people ==
- William Wallace (died 1305) – Scottish warrior
- Wilhelmina Alexander (1756–1843) - Robert Burns' Bonnie Lass o'Ballochmyle.
- Margaret McCoubrey (1880–1955) – Irish suffragist and active participant of the co-operative movement.
- George Campbell Hay (1915–1984) – Writer
- Dougie Vipond (1966–present) – television presenter and drummer of Deacon Blue.
- Peter Nardone (1965–present) – musician
- Richard Madden (1986–present) – actor
- Callum Hawkins (1992–present) – Scottish record holder in the marathon and the British all-time number three.
- Aidan Ferris (1996–present)-
- William Alexander MacLeod 1921 -1988 born in Elderslie, at 3 Glenpatrick Road, to Alexander MacLeod born in Knockbreck, Waternish Isle of Skye and Maggie Dempster McMillan. William was a Pipe Major of the Paisley Highlander’s Association. He left Paisley to be appointed the Pipe Major of the Bendigo Highland Pipe Band in Australia 1952. He later formed the Clan MacLeod Pipe Band there in 1953 , before returning to Paisley in 1955. His wife Nancy ran the Seestu Dance School and she was a champion dancer in her own right. William A MacLeod died in 1988 in Paisley.

== See also ==
- Elderslie railway station
- William Wallace
- Renfrewshire
