= Johnstone =

Coordinates: 55.83461°N 4.50272°W

Johnstone: Scottish Gaelic: Baile Iain; Scots: Johnstoun
- Town
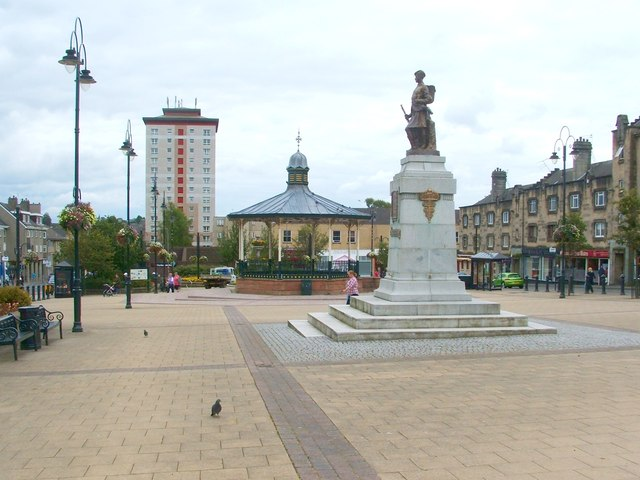
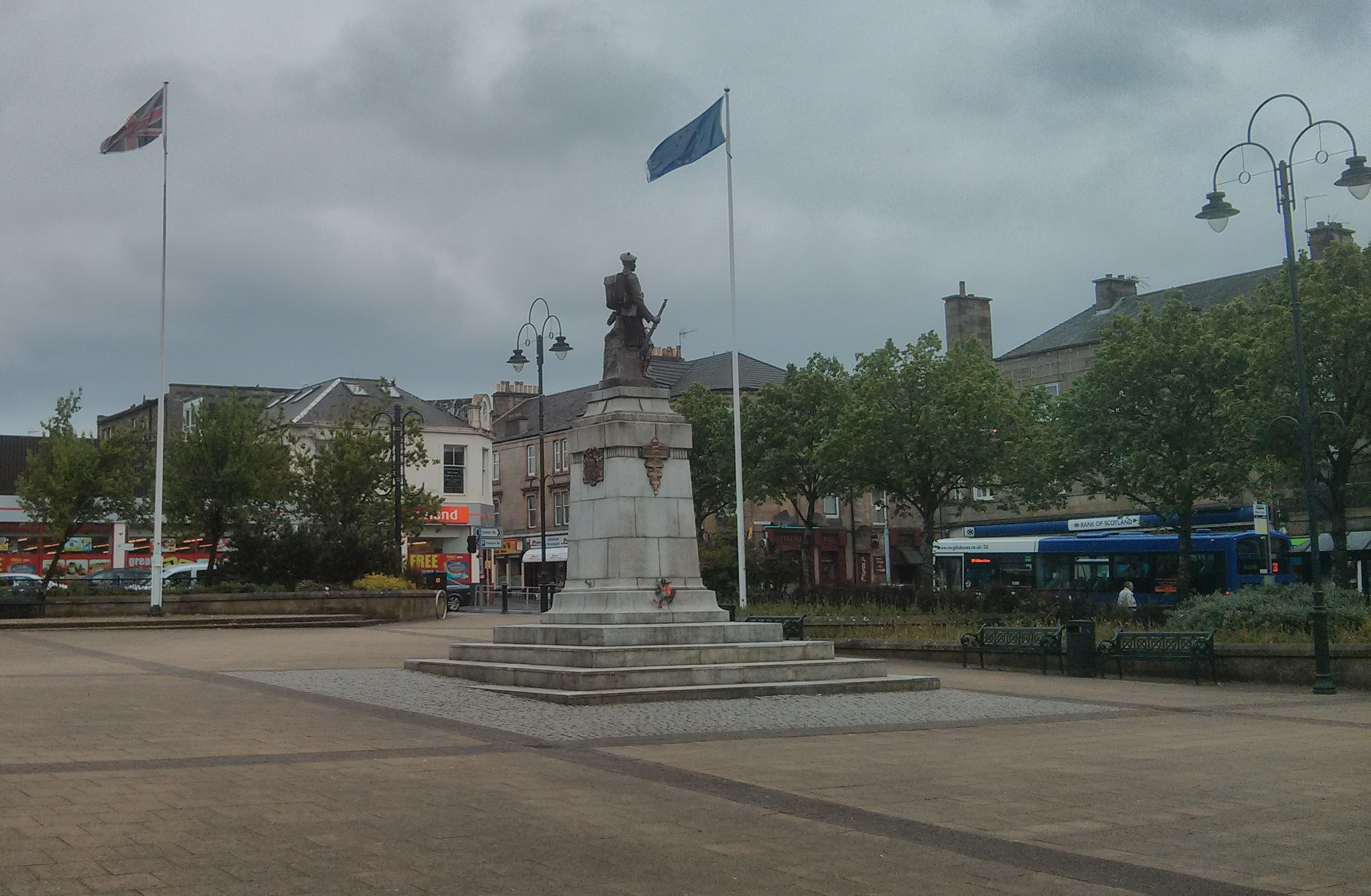
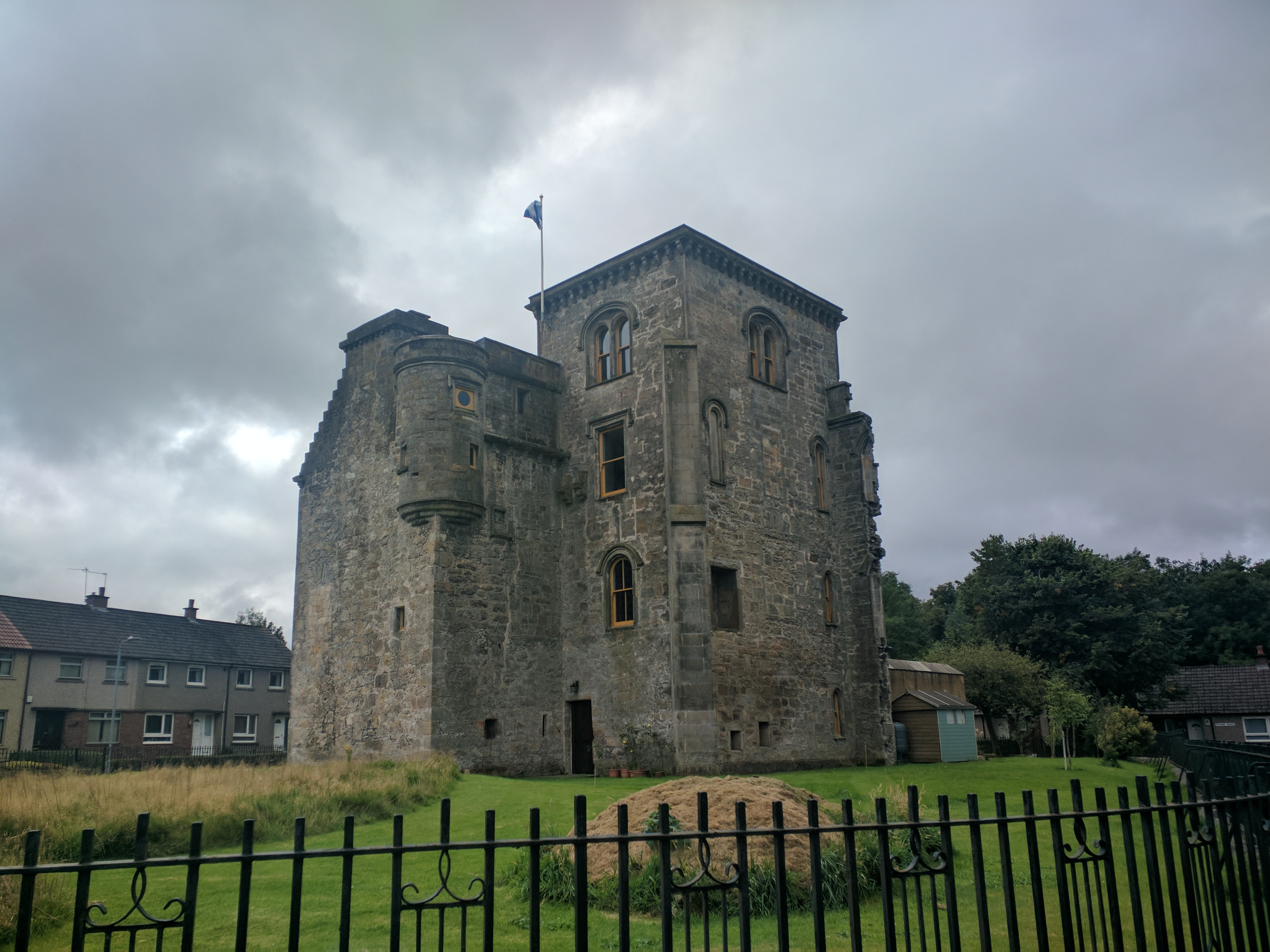
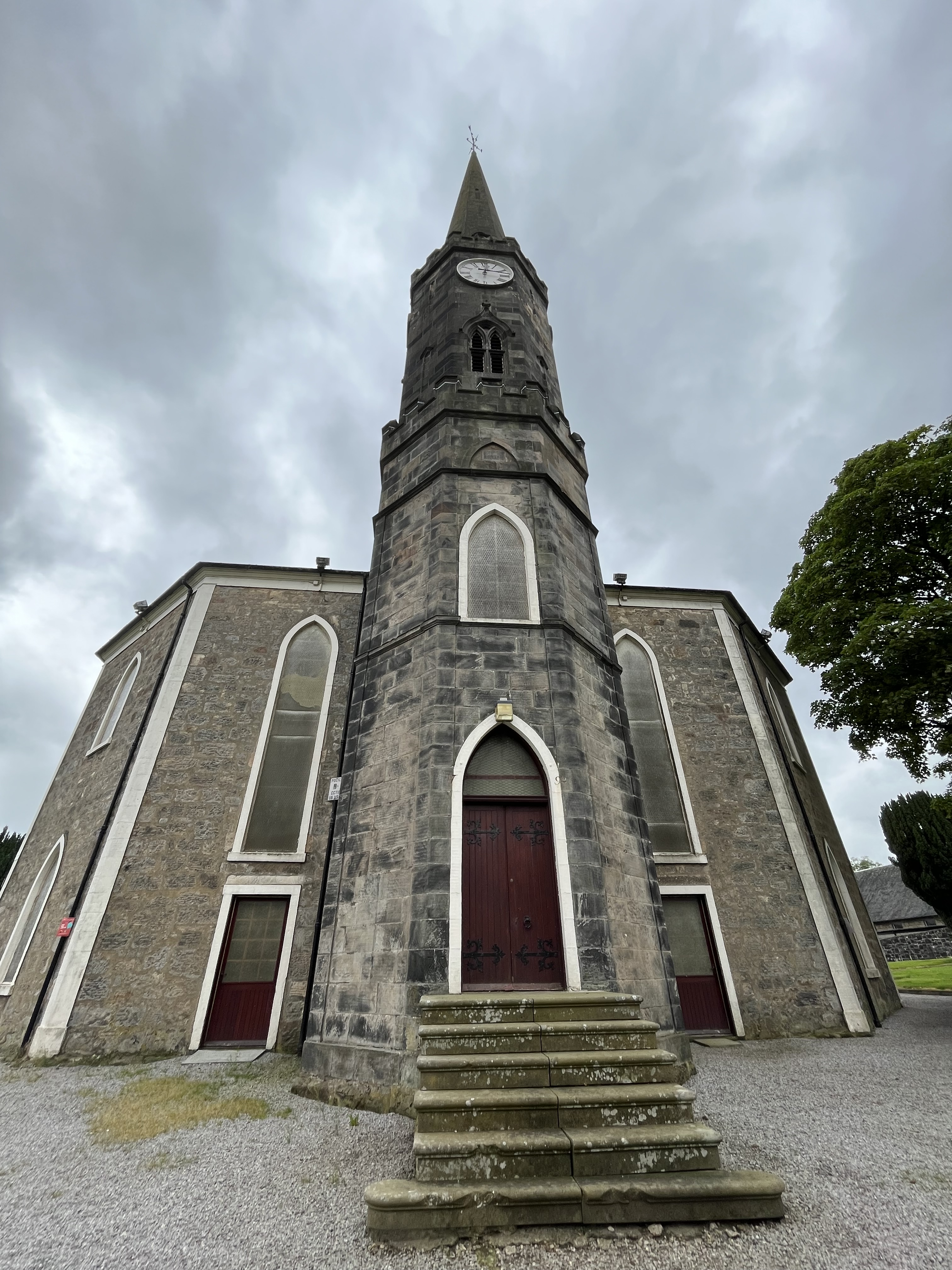
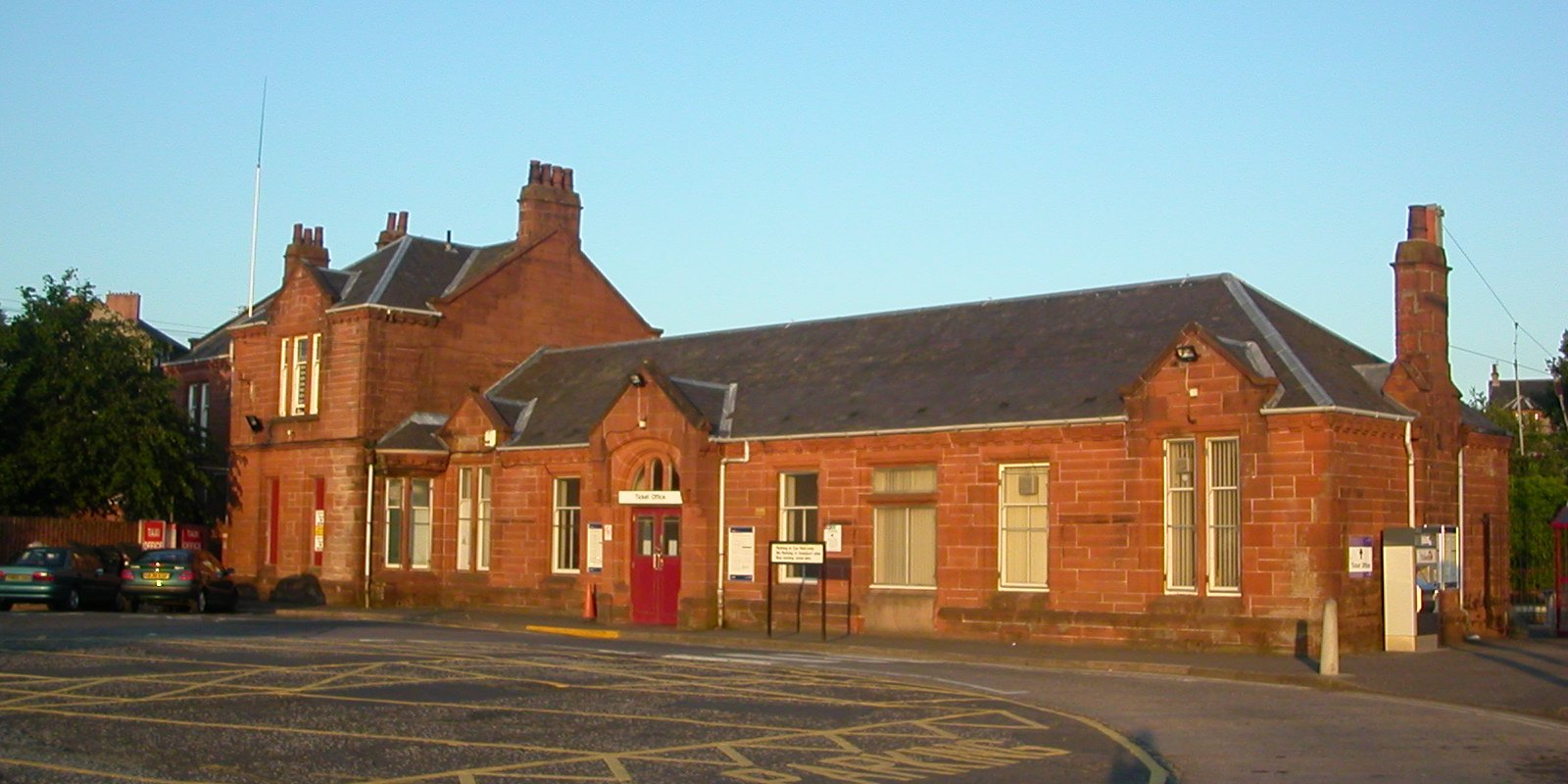
- From top, left to right: Houstoun Square, Johnstone War Memorial, Johnstone Castle, Johnstone Parish Church, Johnstone railway station

- Location within Renfrewshire
- Population: 15,930 (2020)
- Language: English, Scots
- OS grid reference: NS434628
  - Edinburgh: 52 mi (84 km)
- Council area: Renfrewshire
- Lieutenancy area: Renfrewshire
- Country: Scotland
- Sovereign state: United Kingdom
- Post town: JOHNSTONE
- Postcode district: PA5, PA6, PA9, PA10
- Dialling code: 01505
- Police: Scotland
- Fire: Scottish
- Ambulance: Scottish
- UK Parliament: Paisley and Renfrewshire South
- Scottish Parliament: Renfrewshire West and Levern Valley (constituency) West Scotland (electoral region)

Johnstone (Scots: Johnstoun, Scottish Gaelic: Baile Iain) is a town in the administrative area of Renfrewshire and larger historic county of the same name, in the west central Lowlands of Scotland.

The town lies 3 miles (5 km) west of neighbouring Paisley, 12 miles (19 km) west of the centre of the city of Glasgow and 12 miles (19 km) north east of Kilwinning. Part of the biggest conurbation in Scotland, Johnstone is at the western edge of the Greater Glasgow Urban Area.

== History ==
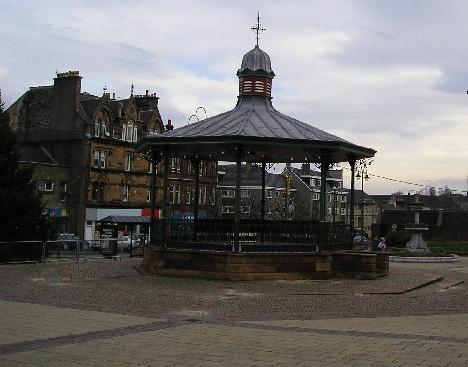
Houstoun Square with bandstand and fountain gifted by the Laird, George Ludovic Houston, in 1891.

Johnstone was largely a planned community which grew up around the house of Easter Cochrane, later known as Johnstone Castle, seat of the Houston or Houstoun family who gained their name from the nearby village of Houston. In 1782, the Laird, George Houstoun, commissioned designs for a series of regular residential streets, which now form the town centre. At this early stage of development, the town's population including the local estate and rural hinterland was around 1,500. Two mirroring civic squares were also constructed in the town: Houstoun Square and Ludovic Square, the latter named for the Laird's son, and by 1794 the town had gained its current parish church. Johnstone was raised to the status of a police burgh with significant local powers, a status which is now defunct. The former court building continues to stand in Collier Street.

Industrial development brought both prosperity and poverty to the community. Coal mining occurred in Johnstone, although its main industry was related to the thread and cotton industries, with mills powered by the Black Cart Water which runs to the north of Johnstone. A six-storey cotton mill, one of the largest in Scotland, was built in 1782, and was rescued from failure by Robert Burns of Paisley sometime before 1812. Burns introduced Richard Arkwright's methods for spinning cotton. As the community expanded, slum conditions formed in part of the town: the population by 1831 had increased to a sizeable 5,600. Unfortunately, the owners of Johnstone mill did not make much philanthropic progress among their worker population, and the situation was not addressed until the 1930s by a significant expansion of the size of Johnstone to include a number of purpose-built residential estates.

Much of Johnstone's feudal heritage has disappeared. With the death of the last Laird in 1931, Johnstone Castle fell into disrepair before being largely demolished in 1950. The remaining tower was purchased in 2001 and is now a private residence. On the site of the former grounds now lies two housing estates, Johnstone Castle and Cochrane Castle. Embedded within Cochrane Castle is the Cochrane Castle Golf Club, which once held the world record for the longest hole.

More recently, Johnstone History Museum opened in 2008 – notably becoming the world's first museum located inside a supermarket.

In 2015, the new Town Hall was completed at a cost of £14.5m.

The town is home to Johnstone Pipe Band who compete in the highest level of pipe band competitions, Grade 1. The band was founded in 1943 and wears the Blue Mackay tartan.

== Education ==
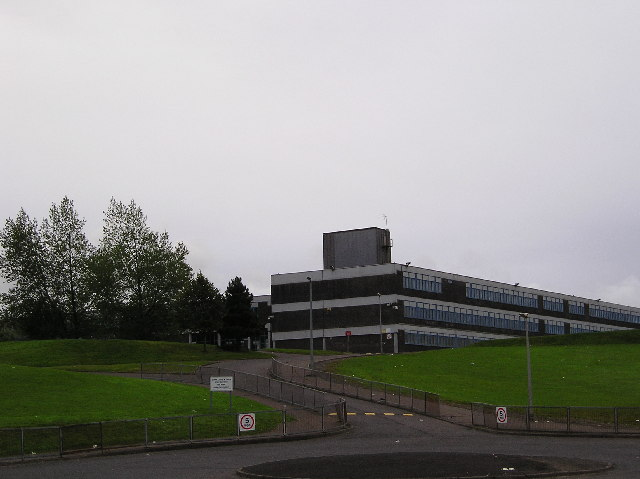
Johnstone High School

Thorn Public School, as it was originally called, opened in 1904. A new Thorn primary school opened in 1988, the same year that the former building was demolished. The old site is now occupied by a housing estate, although parts of the original walls are still standing. In 1950 St. David's Primary School was built along with its sister school Cochrane Castle Primary School. In 2007 the two schools were housed in a newly-built shared building nearby, 'West Johnstone Shared Campus', just outside Thomas Shanks Public Park, the locations of the original schools (between Dundonald Avenue and Craigview Avenue) remained overgrown 'gap sites' for many years, currently being redeveloped with new housing being built.

Johnstone High School opened on its current site off Beith Road in March 1965, the previous building in Ludovic Square having burnt down in 1960 (there is now a modern health centre on its site). Its redeveloped campus opened in late 2009.

The original St Cuthberts High School was built adjacent to Johnstone High School and shared the same driveway and car parks. The school closed in 1972 and moved to a new site in Hallhill Road, Spateston that year. The original school was demolished and replaced by a housing development to the left of the driveway of Johnstone High School. The school at Spateston closed at the end of the summer term of 2006 along with St Brendan's High School in Linwood due to falling rolls and the buildings' poor state of repair. These were replaced by a new build St Benedict's High School at Linwood (named in honour of St Benedict of Nursia, the patron saint of Europe and of students). The old St Cuthbert's building was used to house several schools while their own premises were being refurbished (including Johnstone High School from 2008 to 2009). It was also subsequently demolished in 2010 and has since been replaced by housing.

== Religion ==
The town contains churches of several Christian denominations: three Church of Scotland, two Roman Catholic, one Scottish Episcopal Church, one Evangelical and one Baptist.

== Sports ==
The town is home to the Johnstone Burgh and Thorn Athletic football teams, which currently play in the Lowland League West and the First Division of the West of Scotland Football League respectively.

== Politics ==
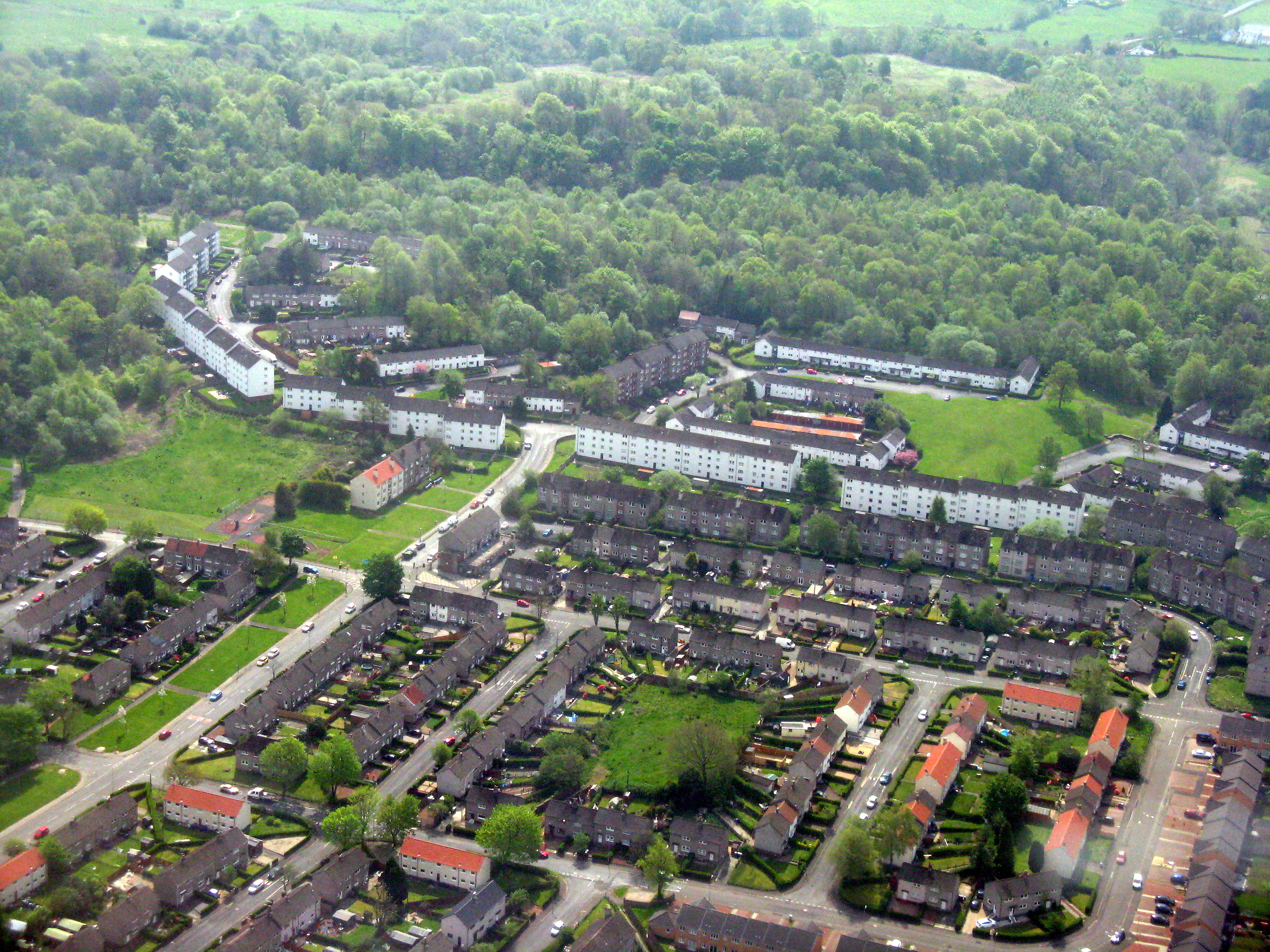
Aerial view of Johnstone Castle housing estate

The town is split between the Johnstone South and Elderslie and Johnstone North, Kilbarchan, Howwood and Lochwinnoch wards for elections to Renfrewshire Council, which elect four councillors each using the Single Transferable Vote. The 2022 Renfrewshire Council election saw councillors elected across the two wards being four Labour Party, three Scottish National Party (SNP) and one Independent.

For elections to the Scottish Parliament, Johnstone is included in the constituency of Renfrewshire West and Levern Valley, currently held by SNP politician Tom Arthur since 2026. Johnstone is also included in the West Scotland region which elects seven additional members. In the UK Parliament the town is contained within the seat of Paisley and Renfrewshire South, represented by the Labour Party's Johanna Baxter since the 2024 general election.

== Transport ==
=== Air ===
Johnstone is served by Glasgow International Airport, which is located 3 1/2 miles (5.6 km) northeast of the town. Moreover, Prestwick International Airport is a 30-to-40-minute train journey from Johnstone railway station.

=== Road ===
A dual carriageway, the A737, connects Johnstone to the M8 motorway to provide car transport links to central Scotland.

=== Bus services ===
McGill's Bus Service Limited operate the majority of local services from their depot in the west end of Johnstone, running the following routes serving the town

- 1/A: Port Glasgow Retail Park – Johnstone (via Kilmacolm, Quarriers Village and Bridge of Weir)
- 2: Johnstone – Bridge of Weir (via Linwood and Houston)
- 20/A: Johnstone – Paisley (via Cochrane Castle, Johnstone Castle, Elderslie and the Royal Alexandria Hospital)
- 30: Johnstone - Spateston
- 31: Johnstone - Cochrane Castle
- 32: Johnstone - Kilbarchan
- 38/A: Glasgow – Paisley – Johnstone – Spateston/Kilbarchan
- 307/A: Johnstone - Lochwinnoch
- 904: Largs – Kilbirnie – Beith – Howwood – Johnstone – Paisley

Shuttle Buses, based in Kilwinning, Ayrshire runs the following services:

- 1: Johnstone – Johnstone Castle
- 5: Johnstone – Spateston

=== Rail ===
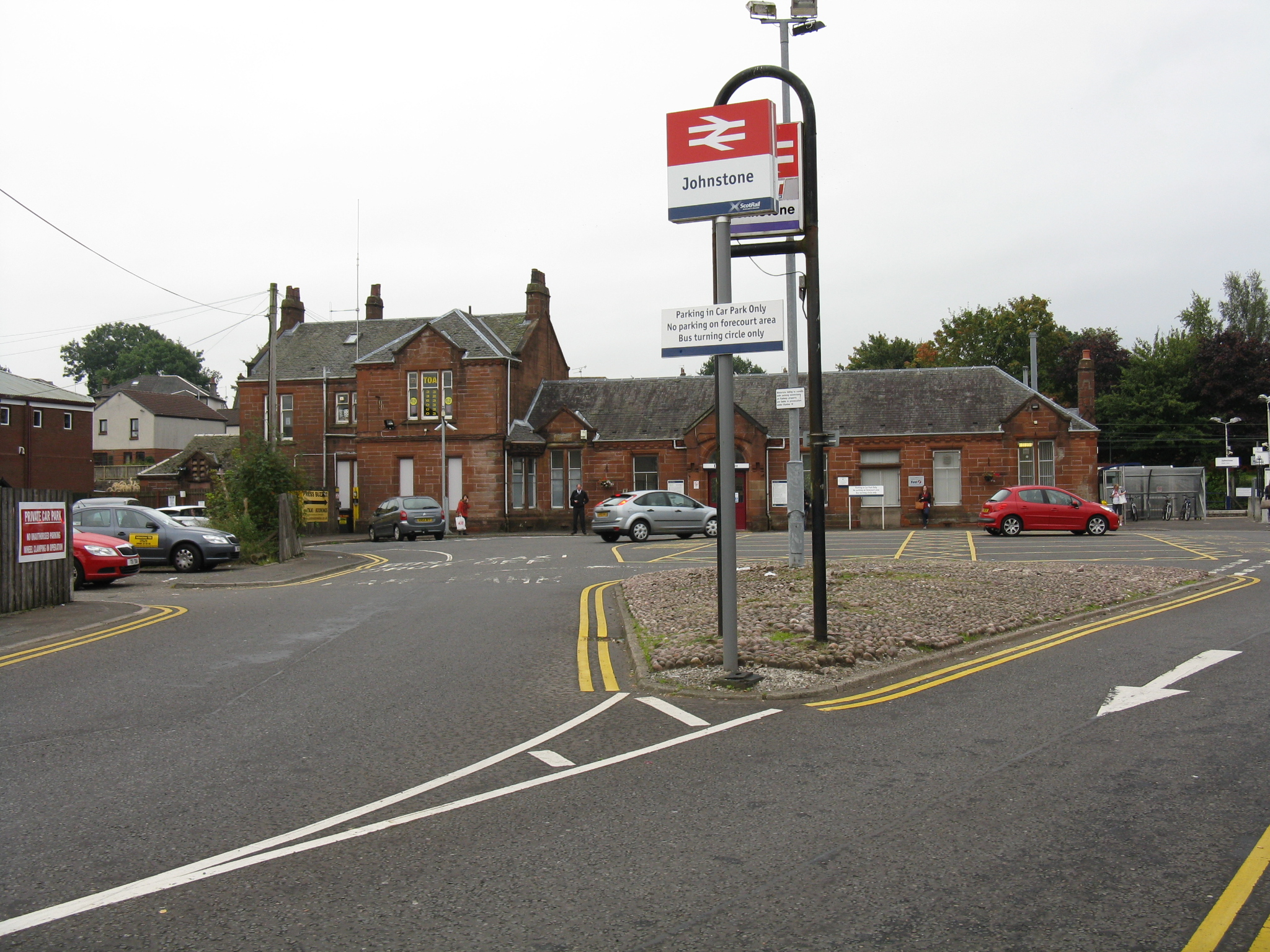
Johnstone railway station

Johnstone is linked to Glasgow Central, Paisley and the Ayrshire coast by the Johnstone railway station which is located at the east of the town on Thorn Brae. A second unstaffed station Milliken Park railway station lies at the west end of the town, just off the Cochranemill road. The railway line runs through the cutting of the old Glasgow–Ardrossan Canal, although the route of the canal runs under the original bridge, Dick's Bridge, at the bottom of the Thorn Brae, where the canal basin was situated and in winter, the rim of the canal basin sometimes becomes visible.

It may be noted that a second railway line ran through the town serving the villages of Kilbarchan, Bridge of Weir, and Kilmacolm; the line now forms part of the Clyde to Forth cycle route (National Cycle Route 75). It had a station serving the Northern, more industrial areas of town, Johnstone North railway station.

== Notable people ==
- Sir William Arrol – Worked as a boy at the Johnstone mills before becoming the architect of Forth Rail Bridge and Tower Bridge in London
- Eddie Blair (1927–2020), jazz trumpeter, born in Johnstone
- Adam Brown – professional ice hockey player; born in Johnstone in 1920, active in the NHL 1941–1952
- Tommy Bryce – professional footballer
- William Clunas – Scotland and Sunderland footballer; played in the first England v Scotland match at Wembley Stadium in 1924
- Hunter Davies – journalist, author and broadcaster
- John Deans – professional footballer
- Robert Pollock Gillespie – mathematician
- Renee Houston – music hall and comedy actress; born in Johnstone in 1902, attended St Margaret's Primary School
- Jim Leighton – professional footballer, attended St. Cuthbert's Secondary School
- Phyllis Logan – actress; attended Johnstone High School in the 1970s
- Annie McGuire – BBC Journalist, born in Elderslie, attended St.Cuthbert's Secondary School
- Alexander McLachlan – poet, born at the Brig in 1818
- John Pitcairn, Jr. – Scottish-American industrialist; born in Johnstone, emigrated to the United States aged five
- Gordon Ramsay – celebrity chef and TV host, born in Johnstone
- Sir George Reid – 4th Prime Minister of Australia (18 August 1904 – 5 July 1905); was Prime Minister for ten months and 17 days, Australia's first federal Leader of the Opposition, federal government's first High Commissioner to the UK
- Peter Tobin – serial killer, born in Johnstone in 1946
- Tommy Turner – professional footballer
- Alba Fyre - professional wrestler

== See also ==
- Johnstone Burgh F.C.
