= Bridge of Weir Railway =

Former railway line in Scotland

Overview
- Locale: Scotland
- Dates of operation: 21 April 1864–1 August 1865
- Successor: Glasgow and South Western Railway

Technical
- Track gauge: 4 ft 8 1/2 in (1,435 mm)

The Bridge of Weir Railway was an independent railway company that built a line from Johnstone to Bridge of Weir. It was taken over by the Glasgow and South Western Railway (G&SWR) in 1865 and formed the base of a line that extended to Greenock, giving the G&SWR access to the harbour facilities there, competing with the rival Caledonian Railway.

The Greenock branch, as it had become, was given a direct access from Elderslie (about midway between Paisley and Johnstone), and fast passenger trains ran between Glasgow and Greenock.

In the second half of the twentieth century usage of the line declined substantially, and the line closed in January 1983.

== Formation ==
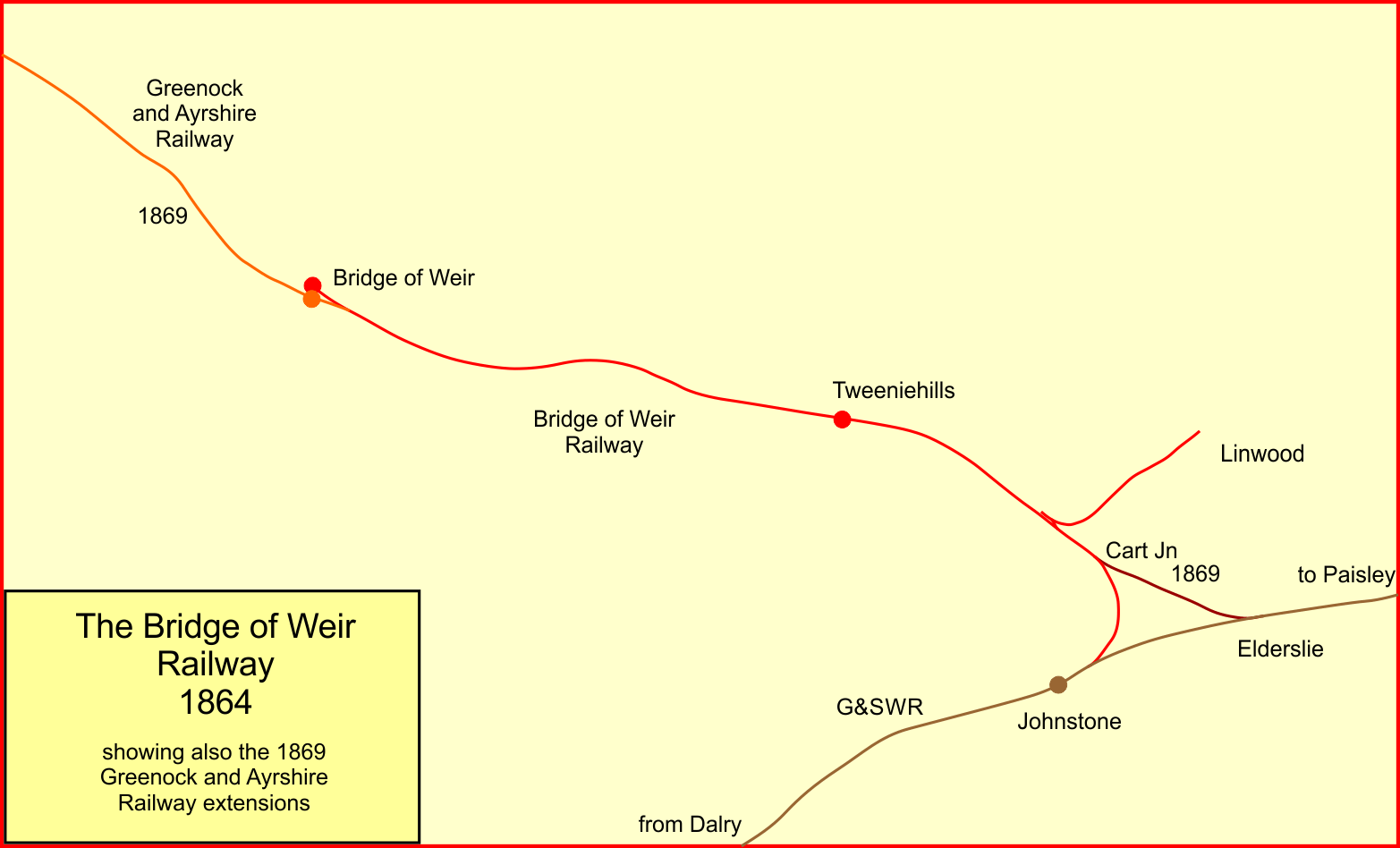
System map of the Bridge of Weir Railway

By the 1860s the Glasgow and South Western Railway (G&SWR) had established itself in the south-western quadrant of Scotland, while the rival Caledonian Railway was dominant in the central region, with an important branch line to Greenock. There was bitter rivalry between the two companies, and each sought to retain primacy in its own area.

In September 1861 local interests approached the G&SWR, hoping for support for a scheme to build a branch railway to Bridge of Weir, but the G&SWR rebuffed them, as its priorities lay elsewhere at the time. Undeterred the local promoters formed a provisional scheme to build from Johnstone to Bridge of Weir, and possibly later to Kilmacolm; capital was estimated at £25,000. Now the G&SWR agreed to subscribe £8,000 to the proposal, fearing that if they did not, the Caledonian Railway would. Working arrangements were finalised on 26 March 1862: the G&SWR would work the line for 42.5% of gross revenue.

Conceived only as a branch line, the proposed route curved into Johnstone station facing away from Glasgow. There was a goods and mineral branch to Linwood, then a centre of industry, joining the main line by means of a backshunt.

Bridge of Weir Railway Act 1862
- Act of Parliament
- Parliament of the United Kingdom
- Long title: An Act for making a Railway from Johnstone to Bridge of Weir in the County of Renfrew, with Branches, and for other Purposes.
- Citation: 25 & 26 Vict. c. cxxi

Dates
- Royal assent: 7 July 1862

Text of statute as originally enacted

The Bridge of Weir Railway was authorised by Bridge of Weir Railway Act 1862 (25 & 26 Vict. c. cxxi) on 7 July 1862. At this time money was hard to come by, but the new company was able to let a construction contract to George Hunter for £15,931.

- First, a Railway commencing by a Junction with the Glasgow and South-western Railway at a Point in the Abbey Parish of Paisley at or near the Passenger Booking Office of the Johnstone Station of that Railway, and terminating at a Point in the Parish of Kilbarchan near the Gasworks in the Village of Bridge of Weir:
- Secondly, a Branch Railway diverging from and out of the first-mentioned Railway at or near a Point in the Parish of Kilbarchan about a Furlong to the Westward of the Farmhouse of Mill of Cart, and terminating in the Lands of Barbush at or near a Point in the last-mentioned Parish about a Furlong to the Northward of the Farmhouse of Barbush:
- Thirdly, a Branch Railway, also diverging from and out of the first-mentioned Railway at or near a Point in the Parish of Kilbarchan about Half a Furlong to the Northward of the Farmhouse of Muirhead, and terminating in the Lands of Clippens at or near a Point in the last-mentioned Parish about a Furlong to the Southward of Erskinefauld Cottage.
— Section 24, Bridge of Weir Railway Act 1862 (25 & 26 Vict. c. cxxi)

The line opened to goods trains on 25 April 1864, and to passengers on 20 June 1864. The company was now short of cash and the G&SWR agreed to defer its charges for working the line for five years at 5% interest—in effect a substantial loan.

== Absorption, and extending to Greenock ==
The Caledonian Railway had a monopoly of the lucrative rail traffic to Greenock, and the G&SWR were interested in competing. Discussions took place in October 1864, which crystallised in a proposed Greenock and Ayrshire Railway, which would extend from Bridge of Weir. The G&SWR was to contribute £150,000 to such a scheme.

The Bridge of Weir line had always been worked by the G&SWR and by the Glasgow and South-western Railway (Amalgamations) Act 1865 (28 & 29 Vict. c. ccxcviii) of 5 July 1865, the Bridge of Weir Railway Company was vested in the G&SWR.

The G&SWR wished to proceed with the line to Greenock, and needed to upgrade and widen the Bridge of Weir line; to carry out the work it closed the line from 18 May 1868. It reopened on 30 August 1869 for goods traffic, together with the curve from Elderslie to Cart Junction, enabling direct running between Glasgow and the Greenock direction. At about the same time the extension to Greenock opened too. Passenger operation on the line started on 23 December 1869. The Greenock station was named Albert Dock, but the Princes Pier was built by the Greenock Harbour Trust, and when that was ready the Greenock station was renamed Greenock Princes Pier.

The G&SWR developed passenger traffic to resorts in the Firth of Clyde, as well as goods traffic from Greenock trans-shipped to coastal vessels. A significant business also developed in the emigration trade.

== Topography ==
The line was short; the passenger stations were:

- Windyhill; opened after the end of the independent existence of the BoWR on 3 April 1871; renamed Crosslee May 1871; renamed Houston 1 January 1874; renamed Houston (Crosslee) 1 January 1875; renamed Houston 7 May 1973; closed 10 January 1983;
- Tweeniehills;
- Bridge of Weir; the station was closed on 18 May 1868 for the upgrading work in connection with the extension to Greenock; when the line re-opened the station on the Greenock and Ayrshire line opened, on 23 December 1869; it closed on 10 January 1983.

== Rationalisation ==
In the 1950s British Railways determined that having two competing routes to Greenock was unsustainable, and passenger trains ceased running beyond Kilmacolm in February 1959. The line closed completely to passengers in January 1983.

== Sources ==
- Awdry, Christopher (1990). Encyclopaedia of British Railway Companies. Sparkford: Patrick Stephens Ltd. ISBN 1-8526-0049-7. OCLC 19514063. CN 8983.
- Jowett, Alan (March 1989). Jowett's Railway Atlas of Great Britain and Ireland: From Pre-Grouping to the Present Day (1st ed.). Sparkford: Patrick Stephens Ltd. ISBN 978-1-85260-086-0. OCLC 22311137.
- Jowett, Alan (2000). Jowett's Nationalised Railway Atlas (1st ed.). Penryn, Cornwall: Atlantic Transport Publishers. ISBN 978-0-906899-99-1. OCLC 228266687.
- The Glasgow & South Western Railway Association
