= Dalry and North Johnstone Line =

Former railway line in Scotland

The Dalry and North Johnstone Line (also known as the Lochwinnoch Loop Line or Kilbarchan Loop Line) was a branch of the Glasgow and South Western Railway (G&SWR) in Renfrewshire and Ayrshire, Scotland, connecting the stations in Elderslie and Dalry via a route running parallel to the existing line built by the Glasgow, Paisley, Kilmarnock and Ayr Railway. This provided additional line capacity for Ayrshire Coast and Kilmarnock services. The loop line was used for passenger services until the mid-1960s, when it was closed by the Beeching Axe. The majority of the line's trackbed has since been absorbed into the Sustrans National Cycle Network.

== History ==
=== The main line to Ayr ===
The Glasgow, Paisley, Kilmarnock and Ayr Railway (GPK&AR) had opened its main line between Glasgow and Ayr in 1839 - 1840. From Paisley the route ran through Johnstone, Dalry and Irvine. Between Glasgow and Paisley, the route was the Glasgow and Paisley Joint Line, operated jointly with the competing Glasgow, Paisley and Greenock Railway. After amalgamations, the Ayr line was part of the system of the Glasgow and South Western Railway (G&SWR) and the Greenock line formed part of the Caledonian Railway, a bitter rival of the G&SWR. As well as the traffic for Ayr, the G&SWR ran trains to Carlisle over the route as far as Dalry, then diverging to Kilmarnock.

=== The Paisley Canal line ===
Over the following decades the route became increasingly busy, as mineral traffic in particular grew in volume, competing for line capacity with express and local passenger trains and ordinary goods trains. On the Joint Line, the traffic of two routes was carried, and the G&SWR decided to construct a line to by-pass the Joint Line. This became the Paisley Canal Line, which opened in 1885. Running from a junction at the south-western margin of Glasgow, the Canal Line rejoined the Ayr main line west of Paisley, at Elderslie. This gave the G&SWR an independent route from its Glasgow passenger terminal, St Enoch station, and its principal goods depot there, at College. However the route followed the course of the Glasgow, Paisley and Johnstone Canal, now filled in, and the multiple curves on the route prevented high speed running.

=== Johnstone North ===
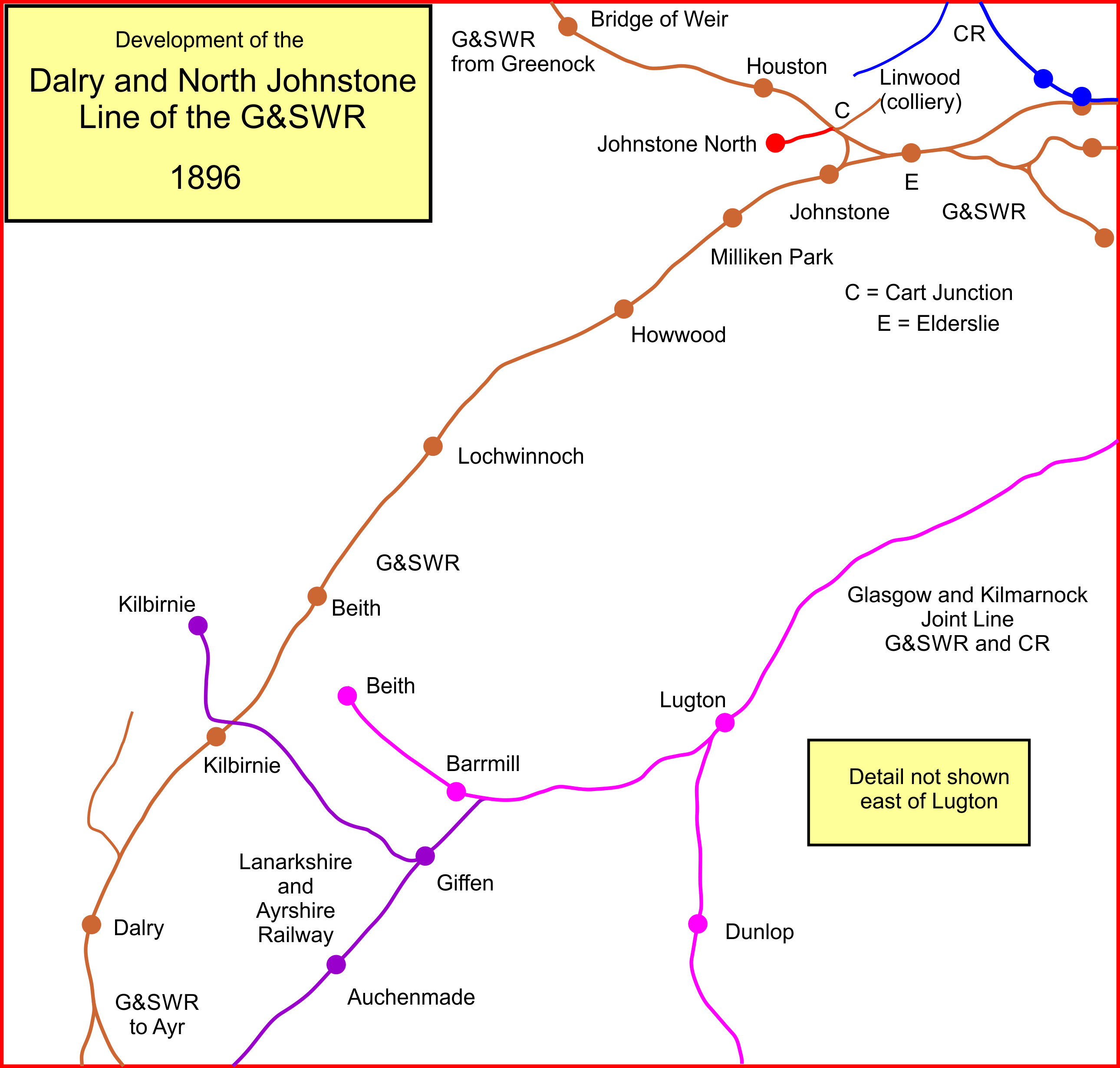
The 1896 extension to North Johnstone

The Ayr main line had always had a station at Johnstone, and the terminal basin of the Glasgow, Paisley and Johnstone Canal was nearby. However industrial activity developed more intensively in the area north and east of the town. This was due in part to the availability of water power from the Black Cart Water, which ran round the north of the town, with extensive mill leats constructed serving textile mills by 1857. In addition, ironstone and coal deposits were being worked, with at least two tramways serving them by the same date.

The G&SWR responded to this by opening the first Linwood branch, from Linwood Junction to Linclive and Candren Ironstone pits, both immediately east of Linwood village. This line too was in existence by 1857.

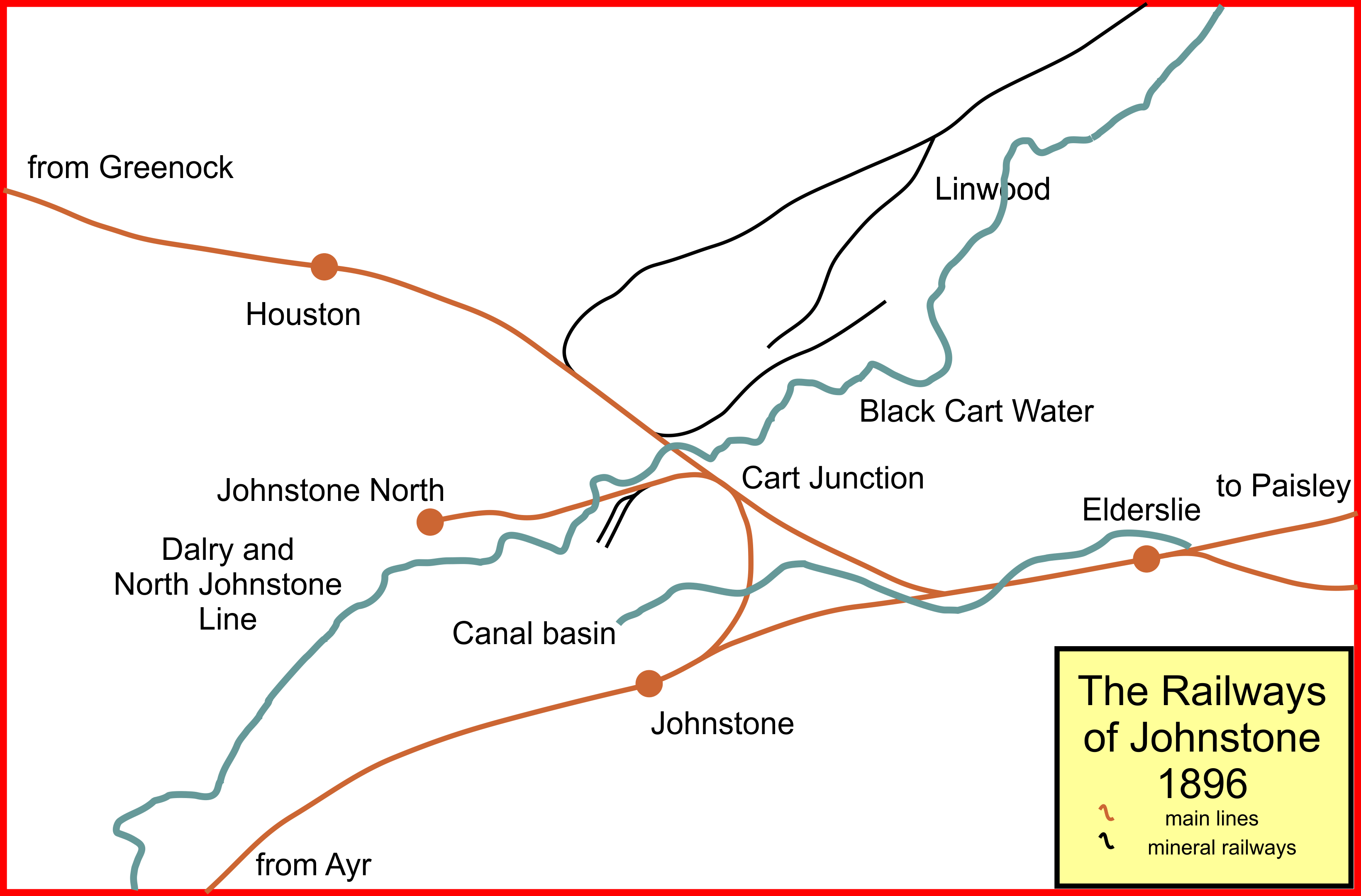
Johnstone railways in 1896

In 1864 the Bridge of Weir Railway was opened from Johnstone station to Bridge of Weir. Nominally independent at first, it was sponsored and worked by the G&SWR, and later taken over by them and extended to Greenock. This line gave a closer connection to the Linwood pits, to Johnstone Gas Works, and to ironworks and foundries that were established north of the town.

In 1895 the G&SWR built a branch line to a new station in Johnstone: Johnstone North. The line left the Greenock line at Cart Junction and ran west to Johnstone North station, located immediately north of Johnstone Bridge (over the Cart). This connected much of the industry, especially the expanding textile works and mineral extraction sites. The station was a terminus, and some of the trains on the Paisley Canal line ran to the stations. The line opened on 1 August 1896.

At Cart Junction further short industrial lines served local factories.

=== Through to Dalry ===
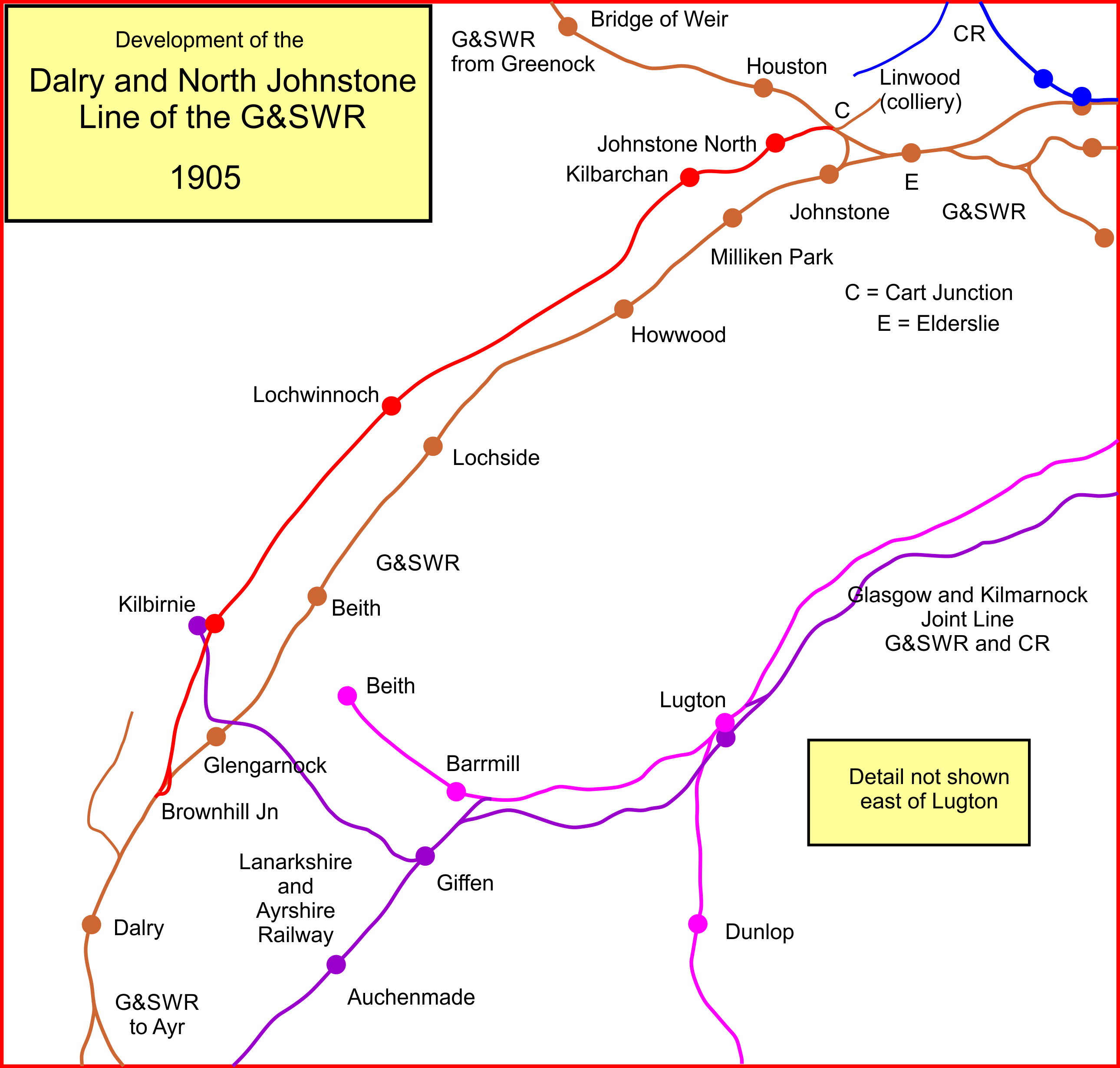
Dalry & North Johnstone Railway in 1905

The congestion problem on the main line continued to worsen. Although the Glasgow, Barrhead and Kilmarnock Joint Railway had opened in 1871, allowing traffic from Glasgow to Carlisle to be diverted away from the Dalry line, the heavy mineral traffic arising directly on the route continued to cause serious line capacity problems, and the GS&WR decided to build a new line from Johnstone North to Dalry, where the line divided for Ayr and Kilmarnock respectively.

The Johnstone North branch line had not been built for fast running, so the new line duplicated the original branch line, taking an easier course with gentle curvature. Leaving Cart Junction on a sweeping radius, it ran north of the earlier line until just before Johnstone North, crossing to the south of it, making a new station there adjoining and immediately south of the earlier terminus. The line opened on 1 June 1905, The original branch line remained active, serving industrial sidings, but closed to passenger trains.

From Johnstone North the line ran broadly parallel to the original Ayr line, but north of Castle Semple Loch and Kilbirnie Loch. New stations were erected at Kilbarchan, Lochwinnoch, and Kilbirnie, and the route rejoined the Ayr main line at Brownhill Junction, north of Dalry, by a flying junction: the first in Scotland. Quadruple track was provided from the junction through Dalry station as far as Dalry Junction, where the Kilmarnock line diverged.

=== Elderslie diveunder ===
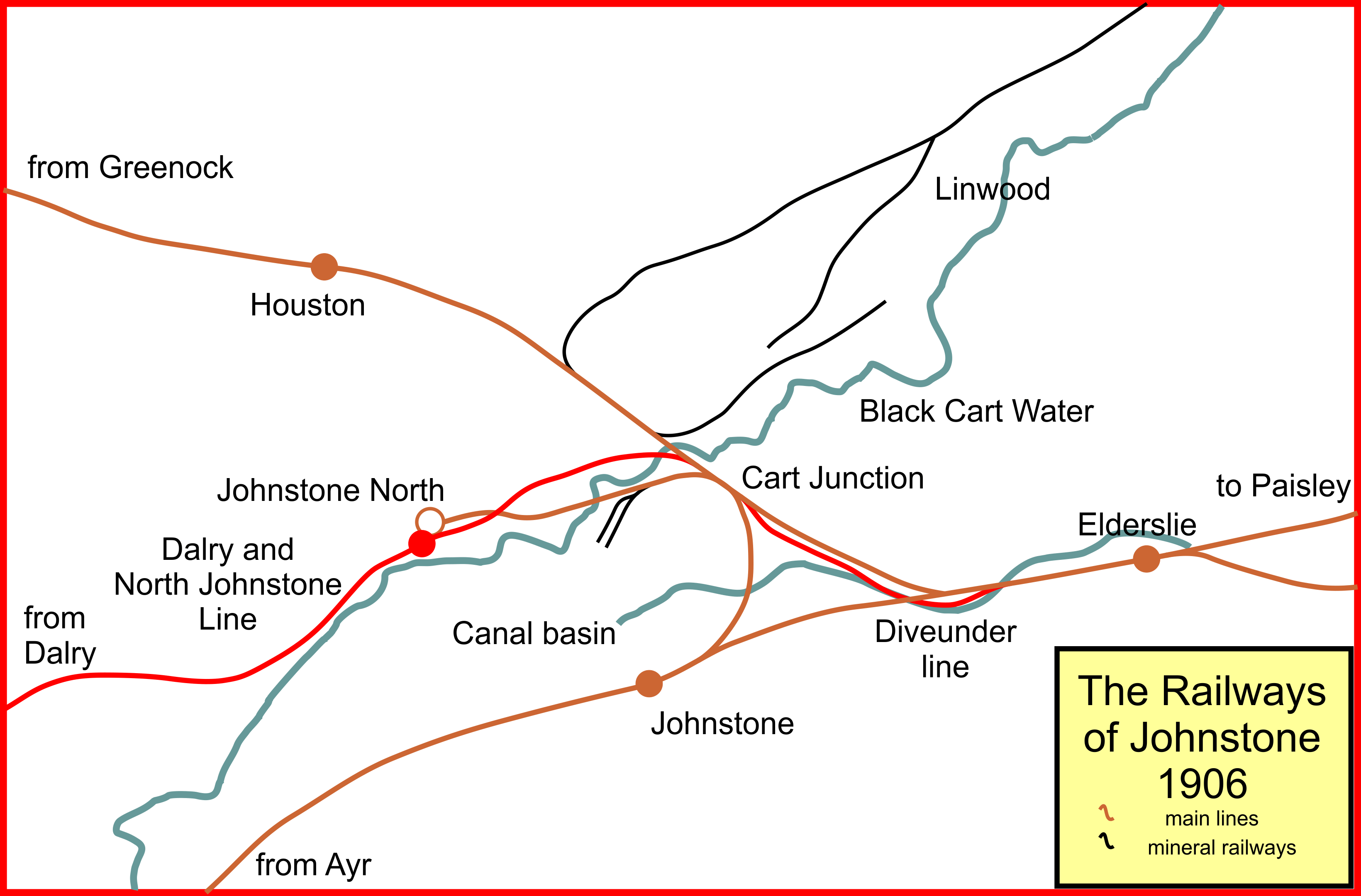
Johnstone railways in 1906

At Elderslie, westbound trains had either continued on the old main line via Howwood, or diverged to the right for Cart Junction and Greenock. The opening of the new line resulted in more trains for Dalry and beyond diverging to the right here, to take the Johnstone North line; in addition fast boat trains for Greenock were of increasing importance. These services conflicted with northbound trains and the main line, leading to delay. In 1906 the GS&WR started construction of a burrowing junction at Elderslie, for the Cart Junction line. When the original main line was built, the Glasgow, Paisley and Johnstone Canal was crossed here by a bridge. The canal was long since defunct, but the bridge was on a suitable alignment, and the dive-under line was made so as to use it.

== Passenger train service ==
The line had about twelve return passenger journeys a day, running from Glasgow St Enoch to Ardrossan, Ayr, Kilmarnock and Largs.

== Closure ==
A casualty of the Beeching Axe, the line closed to regular passenger traffic on 27 June 1966. The line later closed to all traffic from Cart Junction to Kilbirnie on 3 July 1972, with the line between Kilbirnie and Brownhill Junction remaining open until 19 December 1977, primarily to serve Glengarnock Steel Works. The majority of the trackbed is now part of National Cycle Route 7, which runs from Carlisle to Inverness via Glasgow.

== Topography ==
The branch line from Cart Junction to North Johnstone opened on 1 August 1896. The Dalry and North Johnstone line opened from Cart Junction to Brownhills Junction on 1 June 1905, and on that date the original North Johnstone branch was downgraded to goods branch line status.

Entries in italics were not passenger stations.

North Johnstone branch; opened on 1 August 1896; downgraded to goods branch line status 1 June 1905.

- Cart Junction;
- Johnstone North.

Dalry and North Johnstone Line; opened on 1 June 1905; closed to ordinary passenger traffic 27 June 1966; closed completely except between Brownhill Junction and Kilbirnie: 3 July 1972; closed completely 19 December 1977.

- Cart Junction; on Bridge of Weir line;
- Johnstone North; closed to passengers 7 March 1955.
- Kilbarchan;
- Lochwinnoch; note: there had been a "Lochwinnoch" station opposite on the main line; it was renamed "Lochside" when this line opened;
- Kilbirnie; note: the Lanarkshire and Ayrshire Railway also had a "Kilbirnie" station;
- Brownhill Junction; on Ayr main line.

== See also ==
- Railscot on Kilbarchan Loop Line
