= National Cycle Route 7 =

Cycle route in the United Kingdom

National Cycle Route 7 (or NCR 7) is a route of the United Kingdom National Cycle Network, running from Sunderland to Inverness.

== Route ==
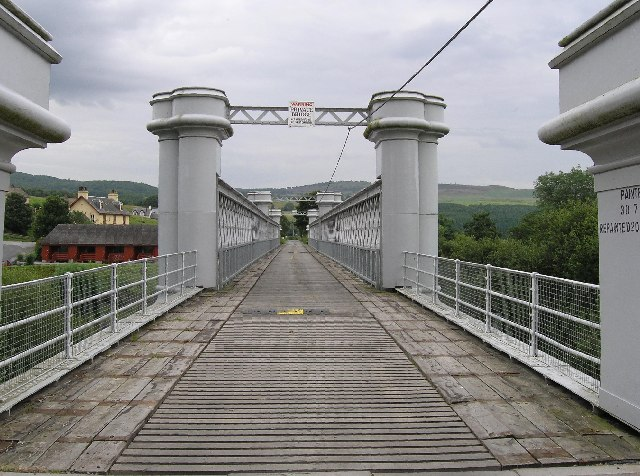
Former railway bridge at Logierait

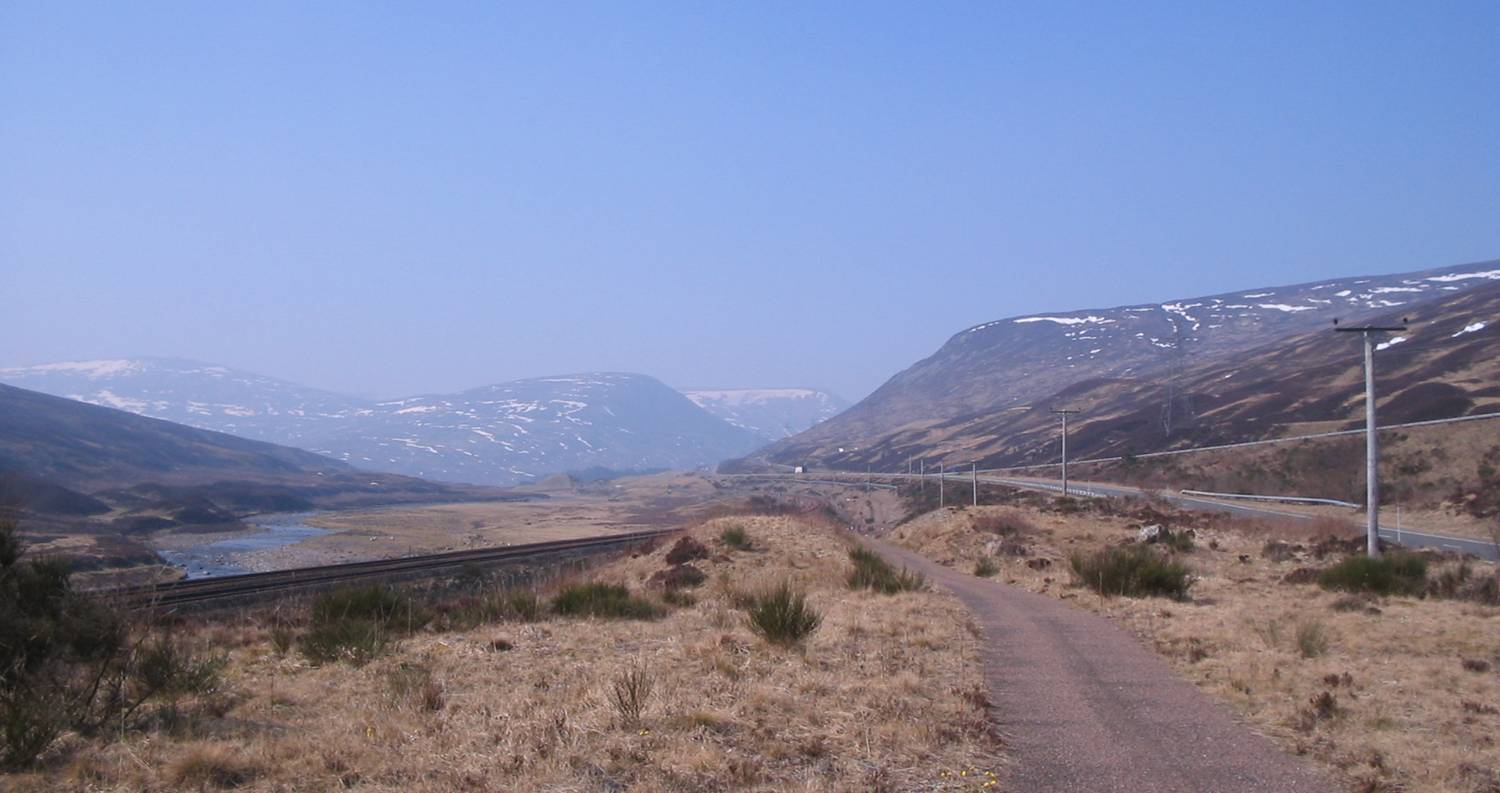
Cyclepath alongside A9 through Pass of Drumochter

For mapping purposes, the route is split at Glasgow into Lochs and Glens (south) and (north)

=== Sunderland to Carlisle ===
This route follows the Sea to Sea (C2C) cycle route for much of its length before the C2C departs to Whitehaven and NCN7 continues to Carlisle.

=== Carlisle to Glasgow ===
The route runs from Carlisle across the border to Dumfries; this section takes a long route at present, but may change following the construction of an "all-purpose route" alongside the M6 extension. In Scotland, the route then heads west to Dumfries and then Newton Stewart. At this point, it does not use the route of the abandoned Portpatrick and Wigtownshire Joint Railway. It then splits into alternative on and off-road paths to run north through hilly country to meet the coast again at Ayr. After meeting the NCN 73 near Kilwinning, it follows back roads and an old railway, meets the NCN 75 west of Paisley, which run together into Glasgow, with 7 and 75 splitting outside the Scottish Exhibition and Conference Centre.

Carlisle | Dumfries | Newton Stewart | Ayr | Kilwinning | Paisley | Glasgow

=== Glasgow to Pitlochry ===
From the point described above, the trail proceeds west along the north of the River Clyde, through Dumbarton to Loch Lomond at Balloch. Regional route 40 branches off here, while the route turns north east into the Trossachs. Passing through Drymen, Aberfoyle and Callander (where it planned to meet NCN 76) it then goes north through Strathyre and Glen Ogle to Killin. Much of this section of the route is off road, using the old trackbed of the former Callander and Oban Railway and Killin Railway . From Killin, the route runs along the south shore of Loch Tay, and then down the glen east, crossing the Tay on the former railway bridge at Logierait from where it turns north to Pitlochry, meeting the NCN 77.

Glasgow | Dumbarton | Balloch | Drymen | Aberfoyle | Callander | Balquhidder | Killin | Kenmore | Pitlochry

=== Pitlochry to Inverness ===
The route north from Pitlochry roughly follows the route of the A9 road and Highland Main Line railway through the Grampian mountains via the Pass of Killiecrankie, Pass of Drumochter and Slochd Summit to the Moray Firth at Inverness.

Pitlochry | Blair Atholl | Newtonmore | Kingussie | Aviemore | Culloden | Inverness
