= List of tallest destroyed buildings and structures in the United Kingdom =

This is a list of the tallest destroyed buildings and structures in the United Kingdom. The list consists only of free standing structures; the numerous guyed radio masts and towers that have been demolished or destroyed are excluded. In addition, the list includes only those buildings and structures that exceeded a height of 80 m (260 ft); around 200 largely residential buildings over 50 m (160 ft) tall have been demolished across the UK since the late 1990s.

An equal sign (=) following a rank indicates the same height between two or more buildings.

Building or structure was demolished intentionally
Building or structure was destroyed by bombing or fire

Rank	Name	Location	Image	Usage	Height	Year completed	Year destroyed	Fate	Notes
1	Grain Power Station	Isle of Grain, Kent		Chimney	244 m (801 ft)	1979	2016	Formerly the second-tallest chimney in the UK.	
2	Inverkip Power Station	Inverclyde		Chimney	236 m (774 ft)	1976	2013	Formerly the tallest freestanding structure in Scotland.	
3	New Brighton Tower	New Brighton, Merseyside		Observation tower	173 m (568 ft)	1900	1921	Structure was neglected during World War I and become unsafe for public use. It was dismantled between 1919 and 1921.	
4	Southwark Towers	Southwark, London		Office	100 m (330 ft)	1976	2009	Demolished to make way for The Shard, which at 309.6 m (1,016 ft) became the tallest building in the UK and European Union upon completion in 2012.	
5	Drapers' Gardens	City of London, London		Office	100 m (330 ft)	1967	2007	Demolished as part of regeneration of the City of London financial district. The replacement office building is 75 m (246 ft) tall.	
6	Great Wheel	Kensington and Chelsea, London		Ferris wheel	94 m (308 ft)	1895	1907	Built as part of the Empire of India Exhibition at Earls Court, the wheel was eventually demolished due to lack of profits.	
7	Limebank House	City of London, London		Office	93 m (305 ft)	1969	1998	The building formerly served as headquarters of Barclays. The bank has since relocated to One Churchill Place in Canary Wharf.	
8	20 Fenchurch Street	City of London, London		Office	92 m (302 ft)	1968	2008	The new 160 m (520 ft) 20 Fenchurch Street nicknamed 'The Walkie Talkie' was completed in 2014.	
9	Glasgow Empire Exhibition Tower	Glasgow, Scotland		Observation tower	91 m (299 ft)	1938	1939	The tower was built as a centrepiece of the Empire Exhibition at Bellahouston Park. In the build up to World War II it was demolished following concerns it would act as a marker for enemy bombers.	
=10	World Trade Centre	Tower Hamlets, London		Office	89 m (292 ft)	1991	2004	The building was heavily damaged by an IRA bombing in 1996. Part of the frame was incorporated into a Hilton hotel which was completed in 2008.	
=10	21 Birnie Court	Glasgow, Scotland		Residential	89 m (292 ft)	1969	2013	The tallest apartment building demolished in the UK, it formed part of the Red Road housing complex.	
=12	Crystal Palace North Tower	Bromley, London		Observation tower	86 m (282 ft)	1852	1939	Despite surviving the infamous 1936 Crystal Palace fire which destroyed the majority of the main structure, the two towers were demolished in 1939 due to concerns they would act as markers for enemy bombers in World War II.	
=12	Crystal Palace South Tower	Bromley, London		Observation tower	86 m (282 ft)	1852	1939	Despite surviving the infamous 1936 Crystal Palace fire which destroyed the majority of the main structure, the two towers were demolished in 1939 due to concerns they would act as markers for enemy bombers in World War II.	
=14	Manchester Assize Courts	Manchester, Lancashire		Court	80 m (260 ft)	1864	1957	The building sustained irreparable damage during World War II and was eventually demolished in 1957. Designed by Alfred Waterhouse, it is regarded as one of the UK's finest 'lost' buildings.	
=14	Winchester House	City of London, London		Office	80 m (260 ft)	1968	1997	Fourth-tallest office building demolished in the City of London.	
=14	153 Petershill Drive	Glasgow, Scotland		Residential	80 m (260 ft)	1969	2012	The second tallest apartment building demolished in the UK, it formed part of the Red Road housing complex.	

== See also ==
- List of tallest buildings in the United Kingdom
- List of tallest structures in the United Kingdom
- List of tallest buildings and structures in the United Kingdom by usage
