= Africa House =

Building in North Ayrshire, Scotland

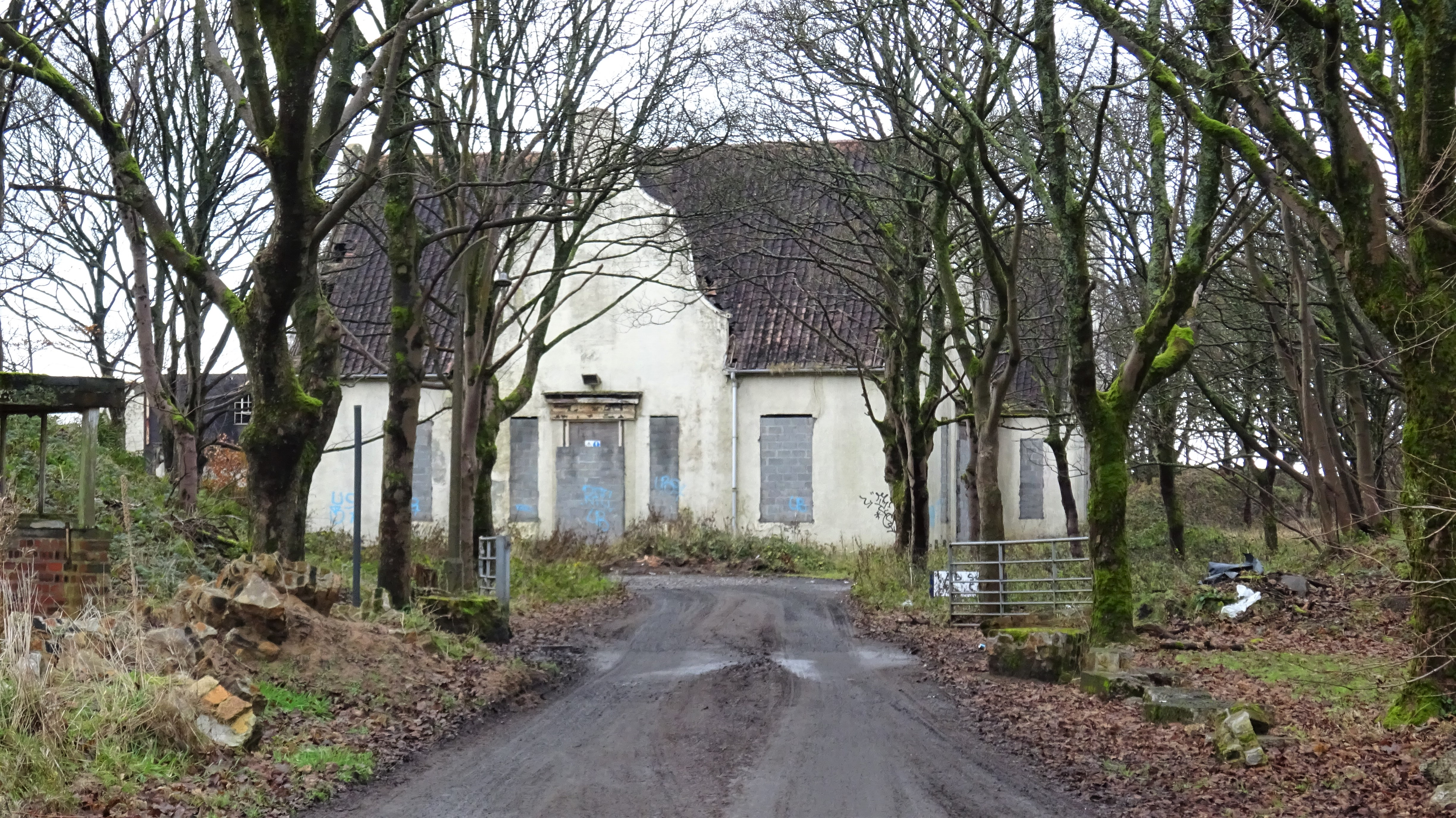
East elevation

Africa House (originally the South African Pavilion) is a Category B listed building in North Ayrshire, Scotland. It was designed by James Miller, or his son George, for the 1938 Empire Exhibition in Glasgow. It was originally a temporary structure built to house an exhibit of South African goods, but after the exhibition was purchased by ICI Nobel, the company transported the structure to their explosives manufacturing plant in Ardeer, North Ayrshire. The structure was re-erected, though some decorative features were omitted, and, as Africa House, it served as a kitchen and canteen for the company's staff. A two-storey concrete-framed extension was added to the structure in the 1960s.

The canteen closed in 1994 and ICI Nobel left the Ardeer site in the mid-2000s. The site was purchased by Clowes Developments in 2006 but little work has been carried out since. The company was criticised for neglecting Africa House which suffered a partial roof collapse. In 2021 the developer applied for permission to demolish the structure on account of its condition, but the application was withdrawn.

== History ==
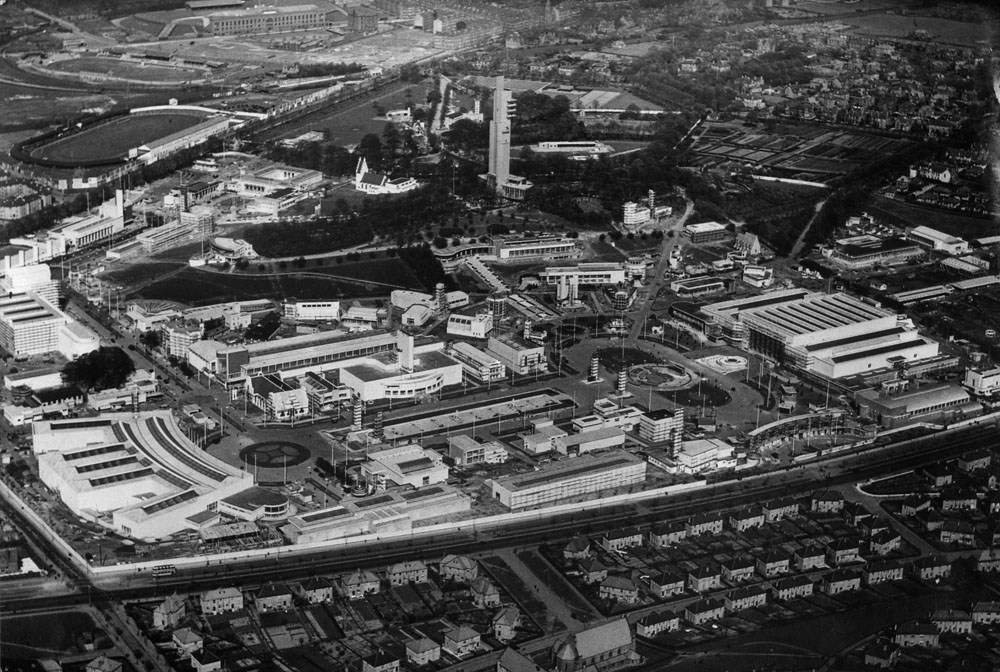
Africa House at centre left (immediately above the roundabout) in a 1938 aerial photograph

Africa House was originally the "South African Pavilion" constructed for the 1938 Empire Exhibition, a trade exhibition hosted at Bellahouston Park, Glasgow, to promote the products of the British Empire. The building was intended as a temporary structure to display products from South Africa. The design has been attributed to the Scottish architect James Miller, though a 2021 planning submission by current owner Clowes Developments attributed it to his less well-known son George Miller. The structure's design has been described as Dutch Baroque, particularly its distinctive curvilinear gables. This is reflective of the Dutch influence in South African architecture. The style was distinct from the more than 100 other temporary structures erected for the exhibition which, under architect-in-chief Thomas S. Tait, were produced in a contemporary, functional style in steel and timber. Africa House stood at approximately 55°50′39″N 4°19′24″W, at the junction of Kingsway and Dominions Avenue. Its main entrance (now its eastern elevation) faced south onto Dominions Avenue, facing the water feature that lay between that road and Colonial Avenue.

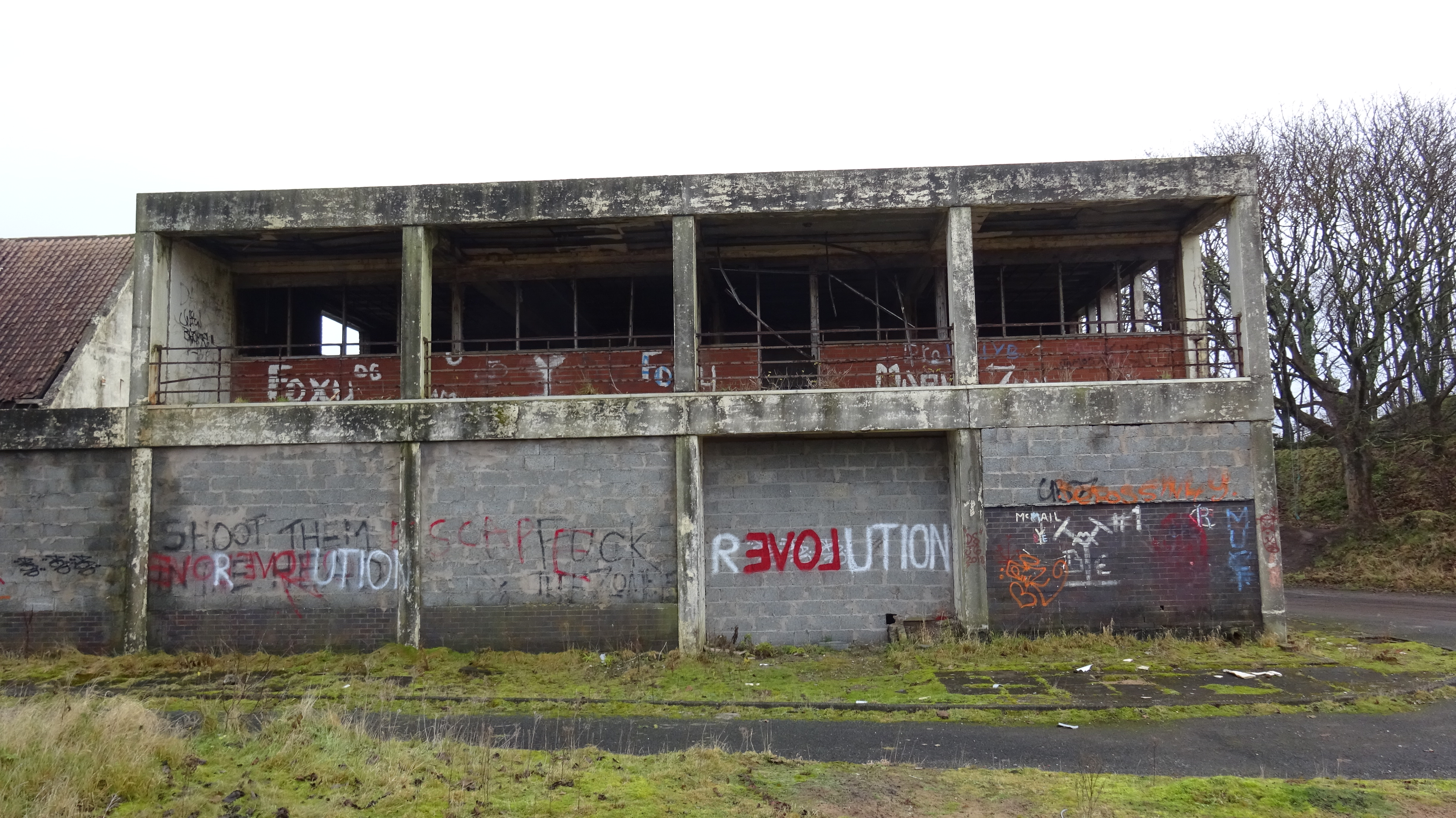
West elevation of 1960s extension

The exhibition ended in October 1938 and many of the temporary structures were dismantled and the site restored to parkland. Although the Glasgow Herald campaigned for it to be retained on site Africa House was purchased by ICI Nobel and relocated to their explosives manufacturing site in Ardeer, North Ayrshire. The company had their own temporary structure at the exhibition, the ICI Pavilion, designed by Basil Spence and made entirely from the company's products, but this was not retained. Africa House is one of the few structures to survive the exhibition, the others being the Palace of Engineering (which was relocated to Prestwick Airport and later used as a factory by British Aerospace and currently Spirit AeroSystems) and the Palace of Art which was always intended as a permanent structure and remains on site in the park. Africa House was used as a kitchen and canteen for the thousands of staff employed by ICI Nobel at Ardeer, and was extended in the 1960s. The structure became a listed building on 31 January 1992 and is currently in Category B.

Africa House fell out of use in 1994 and ICI Nobel left the Ardeer site in the mid-2000s. The site was purchased by Clowes Developments in 2006 but little work has been done to safeguard the structure. Africa House was placed on the Buildings at Risk Register for Scotland in 2019 at which time Historic Environment Scotland noted "the building remains disused and is in a deteriorated condition. The condition of the roof is the main cause for concern – pantiles have widely been lost, exposing the roof timbers to the elements". The site is largely disused and Africa House remains an unusual feature in a site dominated by industrial buildings and largescale blast walls. Part of the site remains occupied by a smaller explosives manufacturing plant but the remainder has been described as the largest brownfield site in Scotland. The site has been partially reclaimed by nature and it has been called one of the most important wildlife sites in the United Kingdom.

In early 2021 Clowes applied for planning permission to demolish Africa House as part of their wider redevelopment of the site. They stated in their application that "restoration would be unviable, given the extent and damage to the building's internal fabric and envelope". At least 15 objections were raised to the application, with many citing concerns that if the application was allowed the developer would be rewarded for their neglect of the structure, which had suffered a significant roof collapse in recent years. Local councillors representing Stevenston also objected to the application. An early April survey carried out by the local group Friends of Stevenston found 62 per cent of local residents opposed the demolition and only 28 per cent in favour. In May planning officials recommended that councillors reject the application for demolition. The developer learnt of this and withdrew the application, entering into discussions with the council on the building's future.

== Description ==
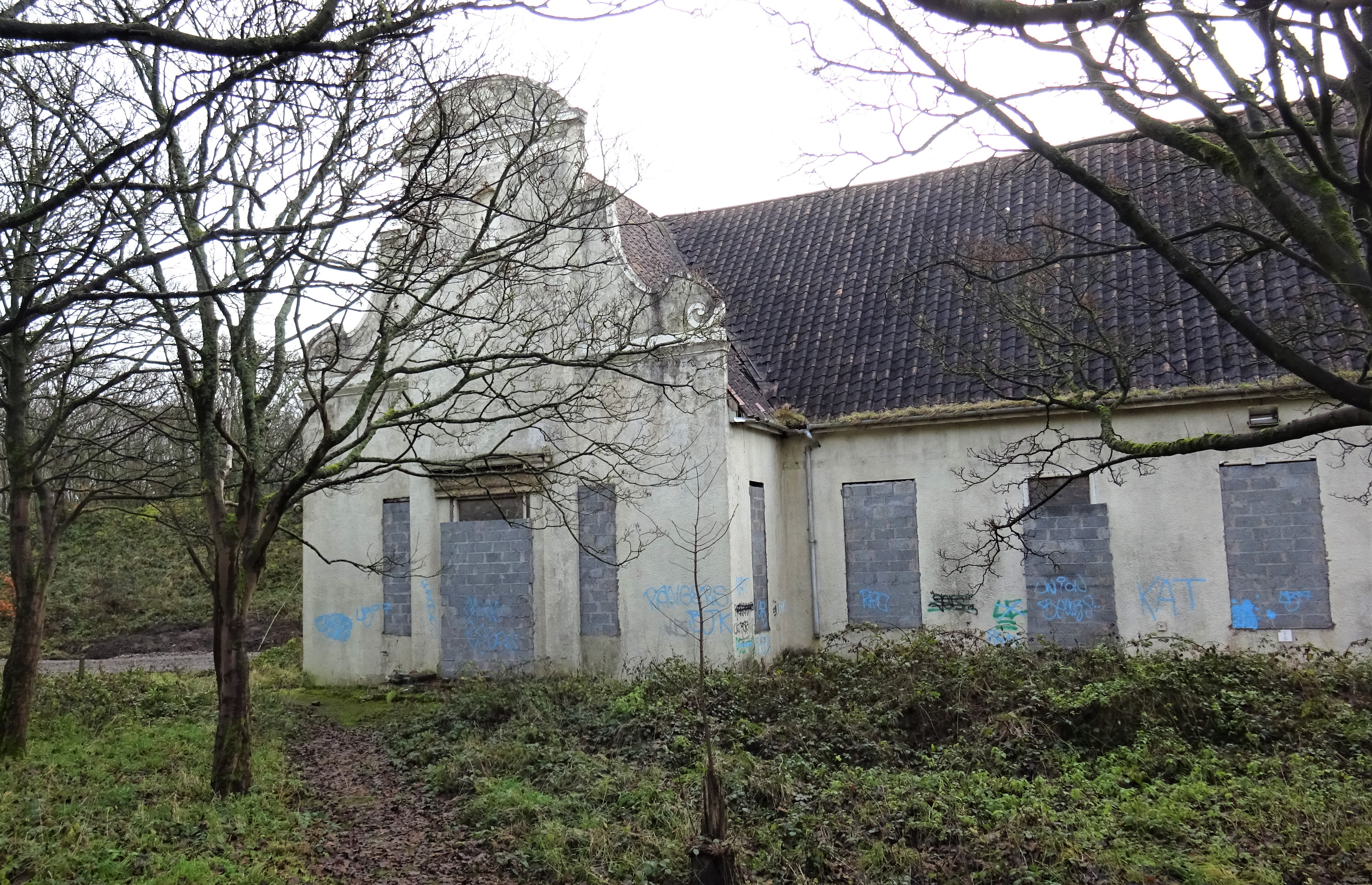
East gable of north elevation

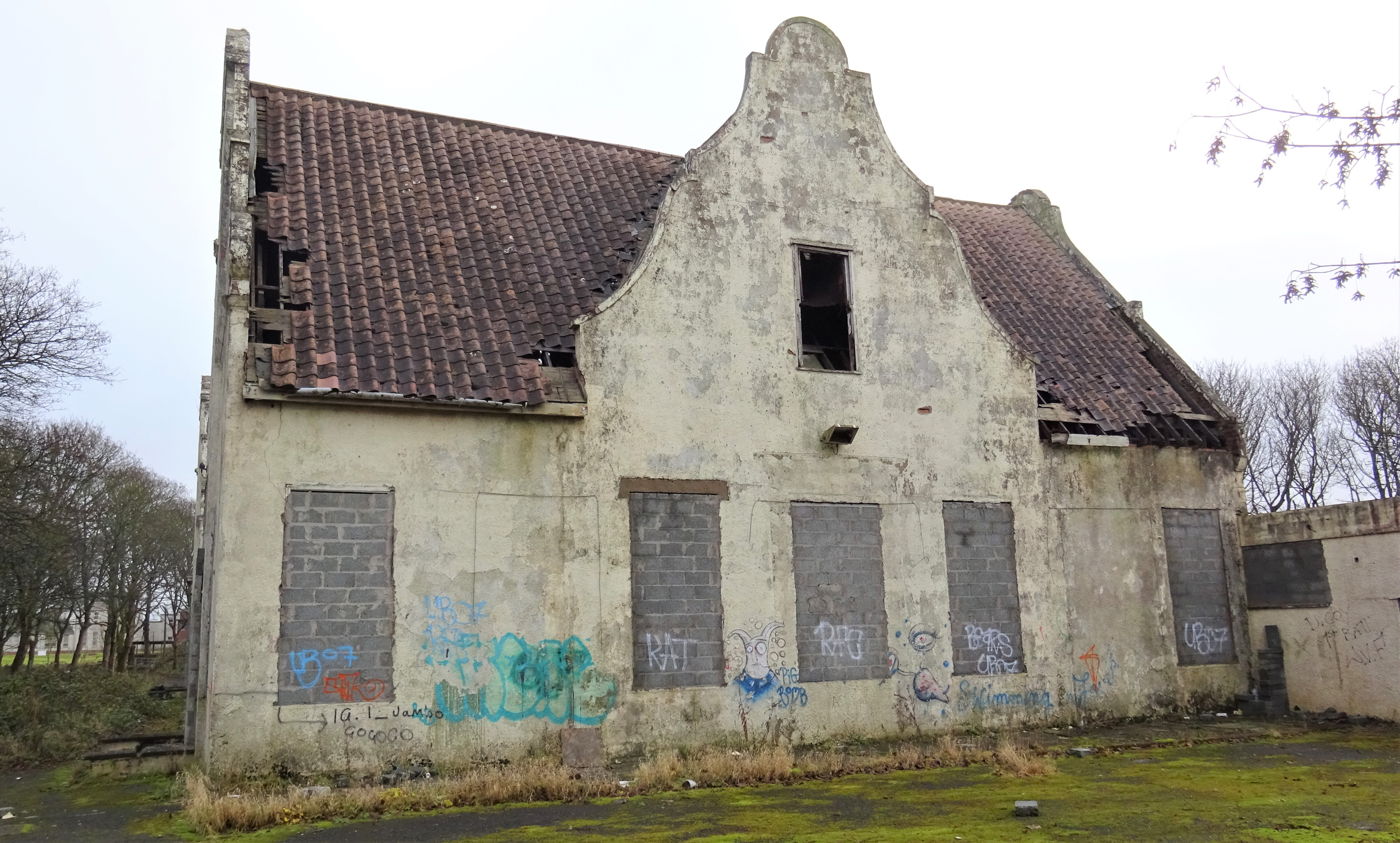
West elevation

Africa House is a single-story seven by three bay structure. It is of steel and timber frame with asbestos cement cladding, which was painted cream. The roof is steeply pitched and formed of brown pantiles, though some on the western end were later replaced with slates. The main windows are sash and case with large astragal moulding. The building, which had been compared with the ICI Nobel guesthouse in Modderfontein, South Africa, was slightly modified when re-erected at Ardeer, losing some elaborate finials to the gables on the southern elevation and the pediment from the main entrance on the east elevation. The 1960s concrete-framed extension was added from the western gable on the southern elevation and is flat-roofed with two storeys.

The main entrance, which is now the east elevation is formed of a central bay with a two-leaf door flanked by two narrow windows and a bay either side consisting of a single window each. The door was elaborately detailed with a sweetheart moulding and fanlight with diagonal astragal detailing, it was approached by two red-tiled steps. There was once a window set above the door in the central bay. The now north elevation is of seven bays, with the end two formed as projecting gables. The central section has three windows and two doors, placed alternately. The doors on this elevation were tall with multi-pane grid-patterned fanlights. The gables were curvilinear in style with largescale scrollwork along the sides and surmounted by a semi-circular pediment. The centre of each gable projected slightly and contained a door set within a canted entablature. As with the east elevation a window was situated above each door but these were later blocked up. The main windows on this elevation were formed from 30 small glass panes, the narrow windows of 15 panes. The current west elevation was of five windowed bays formed of 18 panes each. The rear of the structure (currently the south elevation) is described by Historic Environment Scotland as "very plain" with the two gables having straight edges and simple semi-circular pediments. The windows on this side were small and formed of nine panes.
