= Glasgow Summer Sessions =

Concert series in Glasgow, Scotland

- Genre: Rock, Alternative, Dance, Rap
- Dates: August
- Locations: Bellahouston Park, Glasgow, Scotland
- Years active: 2013 – present
- Capacity: 35,000
- Website: http://www.dfconcertsandevents.com/gss/

The Glasgow Summer Sessions which began in 2013 is an annual series of concerts held late June or early July at Bellahouston Park in the Southside of Glasgow, Scotland. Taking place over 2–3 nights the event attracts up to 100,000 people each year and some of the biggest names in music.

== History ==
The festival was founded in 2013 by Geoff Ellis, DF Concerts & Live Nation UK

In its debut year of 2013 crowds of 100,000 saw Avicii, Eminem and Kings of Leon over three nights with an average of over 33,000 people per night.

August 2014 saw 60,000 attend concerts headlined by French, DJ David Guetta & Las Vegas Rockers The Killers whilst 2015 saw two 35,000 sold-out shows headlined by Scottish artists Paolo Nutini and Calvin Harris.

The 2016 Summer Sessions were Headlined by Noel Gallagher's High Flying Birds on the Friday night in front of a crowd of over 25,000. The following evening was headlined by Scottish Rockers Biffy Clyro with a Sold-Out crowd of 35,000.

On Thursday 2 March 2017 it was announced that American hip-hop star Eminem would Headline the 2017 Summer Sessions. This would be Eminem's second Summer Sessions appearance after Headlining the event in 2013. Tickets became available on Friday 3 March 2017 and as of Tuesday 21 March 2017 the show had sold out with all 35,000 tickets being snapped up.

In February 2018, rapper Kendrick Lamar performed to a sold-out crowd at the SSE Hydro. As he left the stage after the concert, he apologized for the five-year gap since his previous performance in the city and promised to return sooner rather than later. Just 24 hours later, it was confirmed that he would headline the Summer Sessions in August 2018. Tickets went on sale at the beginning of March, and all 35,000 sold out within a matter of days.

== List of Headliners ==
- 2013: Kings of Leon, Avicii, Eminem
- 2014: David Guetta, The Killers
- 2015: Paolo Nutini, Calvin Harris
- 2016: Noel Gallagher's High Flying Birds, Biffy Clyro
- 2017: Eminem
- 2018: Kings of Leon, Catfish and the Bottlemen, Kendrick Lamar
- 2019: The Cure, Foo Fighters, The 1975
- 2024: Green Day
- 2025: Sting, Simple minds, Stereophonics, Sex pistols feat. Frank Carter
- 2026: The Lumineers, Teddy Swims, Alanis Morissette, Pitbull, Kings Of Leon, My Chemical Romance

== Line-Ups ==
=== 2013 ===
Thursday 15 August	Saturday 17 August	Tuesday 20 August
Kings of Leon; The Courteeners	Avicii; Tinie Tempah; Steve Aoki	Eminem; Kendrick Lamar; EarlWolf; Yelawolf; Chance the Rapper

=== 2014 ===
Saturday 16 August	Tuesday 19 August
David Guetta; Steve Angello; Oliver Heldens	The Killers; The Courteeners; Miles Kane

=== 2015 ===
Saturday 29 August	Sunday 30 August
Paolo Nutini; Grace Jones; The View; SOAK; Tuff Luv	Calvin Harris; Ellie Goulding; John Newman; Disciples; Burns

=== 2016 ===
Friday 26 August	Saturday 27 August
Noel Gallagher's High Flying Birds; Richard Ashcroft; Frightened Rabbit; Circa Waves	Biffy Clyro; Fall Out Boy; Wolf Alice; Cage The Elephant

=== 2017 ===
Thursday 24 August
- Eminem
- Run The Jewels
- Danny Brown
- Russ

=== 2018 ===
Wednesday 22 August	Saturday 25 August	Wednesday 29 August
Kings Of Leon; The Wombats; The Hunna; Everything Everything; Isaac Gracie	Catfish and the Bottlemen; Twin Atlantic; DMA's; Peace; Frank Carter & The Rattlesnakes; Neon Waltz	Kendrick Lamar; N.E.R.D; Bugzy Malone

=== 2019 ===
Friday 16 August	Saturday 17 August	Sunday 25 August
The Cure; Mogwai; The Twilight Sad; The Joy Formidable	Foo Fighters; Frank Carter & The Rattlesnakes; Slaves; Hot Milk; The Van Ts	The 1975; Twin Atlantic; You Me At Six; Pale Waves; Ten Tonnes; No Rome

== See also ==
- T in the Park
- List of music festivals in the United Kingdom
