= Thomas S. Tait =

Scottish architect (1882–1954)

- Born: 18 June 1882; Paisley, Renfrewshire, Scotland
- Died: 18 July 1954 (aged 72); Aberfeldy, Scotland
- Education: Glasgow School of Art; Royal Academy Schools
- Occupation: Architect
- Awards: RIBA Gold Medal, Best Building of 1933
- Practice: John Burnet & Partners; Burnet, Tait & Lorne
- Buildings: Selfridges, Oxford Street; the Daily Telegraph Building, Fleet Street; Unilever House, Blackfriars; Sydney Harbour Bridge.

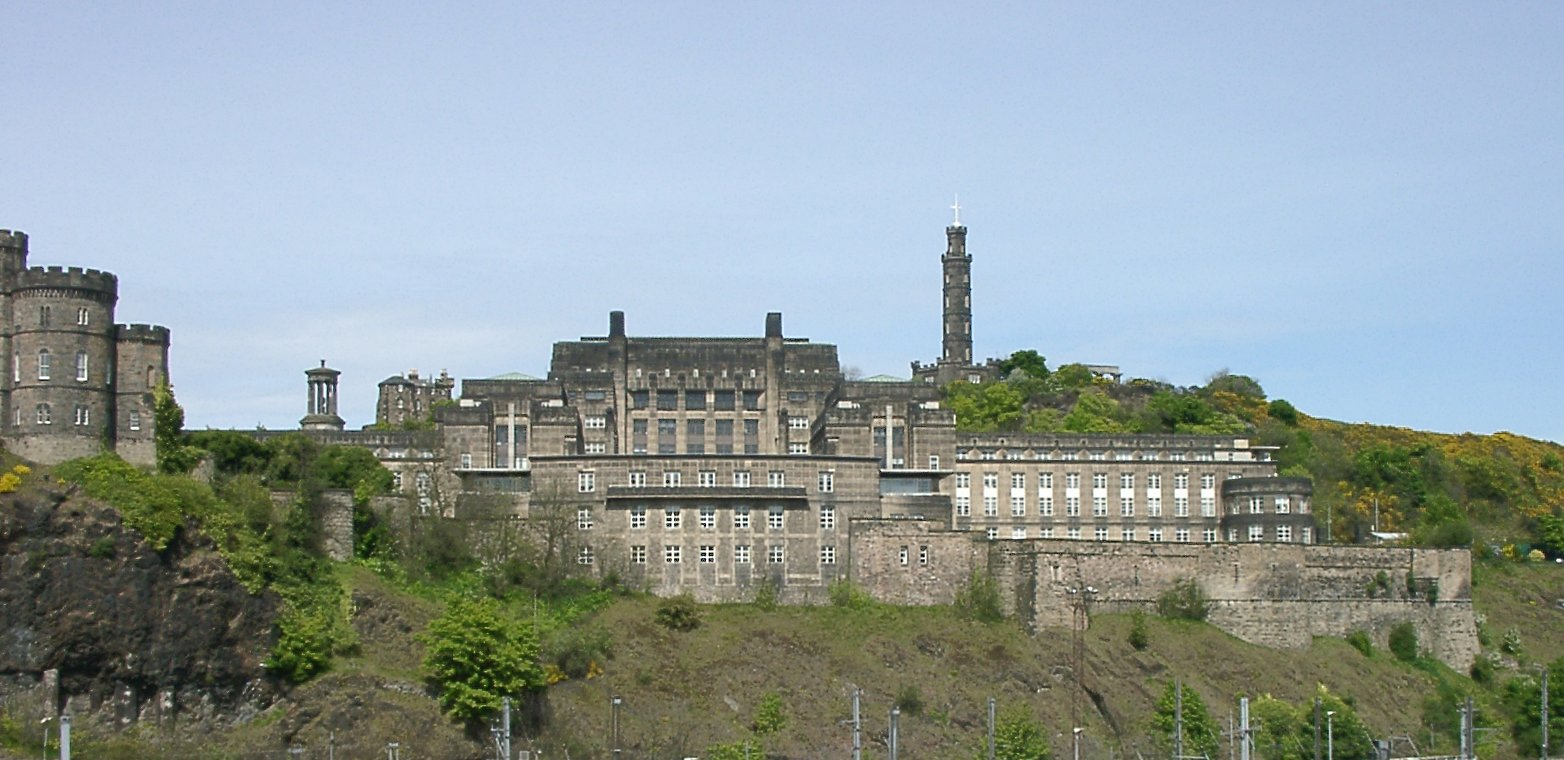
Southern aspect of St Andrew's House on Calton Hill Edinburgh.

Thomas Smith Tait (18 June 1882 – 18 July 1954) was a Scottish modernist architect. He designed a number of buildings around the world in Art Deco and Streamline Moderne styles, notably St. Andrew's House (the headquarters of the Scottish Government) on Calton Hill, Edinburgh, and the pylons for Sydney Harbour Bridge.

== Biography ==
Born in 1882 in Paisley, the son of a master stonemason, he was educated at the John Neilson Institution, following which he entered apprenticeship as an architect with James Donald in Paisley. Tait went on to Glasgow School of Art where he studied under the Beaux Arts teacher Eugene Bourdon. He travelled extensively in Europe between 1904 and 1905, before settling in London where he joined the prestigious architectural practice of Sir John James Burnet.

In 1910 he married Constance Hardy, the daughter of a London stationmaster, and they set up home at 26 Holyoake Walk in Ealing. Together they had three sons; the eldest, Gordon, born in 1912, later became an architect himself, and worked with his father on the designs for the Empire Exhibition, Scotland 1938 held in Glasgow. In June 1913 Tait sat and passed the RIBA's qualifying exam and was admitted ARIBA in September 1913, with the influential backing of Burnet, Theodore Fyfe and Herbert Vaughan Lanchester as proposers.

His former dwelling at Gates House, Wyldes Close, Hampstead Garden Suburb London NW11 has been marked with a Blue Plaque by English Heritage.

== John Burnet & Sons ==
In 1902, Tait was recruited by the architecture firm John Burnet & Son and worked under the founder's son, John James Burnet.

In 1905, Burnet was appointed to design new galleries at the British Museum in London. Burnet opened a London office at 1 Montague Place, calling it simply John J Burnet, and took Tait with him as his personal assistant.

By 1910, Tait was a leading member of Burnet's staff, and played an important part in the design of the Kodak Building in London, considered to be among the first examples of modern architecture in the United Kingdom and which was highly influential on the design of many commercial buildings of the time.

Following his marriage in 1910, Tait took on extra work at a rival practice, Trehearne and Norman, assisting in the facade design of several commercial buildings on Kingsway and Aldwych. He took this work without the knowledge of Burnet, and when Burnet learned of Tait's moonlighting in 1914, the two fell out. Tait suddenly left London for New York, leaving his wife and son Gordon at home, to work as an assistant with Donn Barber.

Tait soon returned to London and took a job as chief draughtsman to Trehearne & Norman on further Kingsway buildings. Between 1915 and 1918, Tait and Burnet became reconciled and collaborated on a number of projects, culminating in Tait's return to Burnet's practice in 1918 as a partner. The firm was renamed Sir John Burnet & Partners.

Due to ill health, Burnet himself grew less active in the partnership, and Tait's role increased. In 1925 Tait was made a fellow of the Royal Institute of British Architects (RIBA). Tait's growing reputation resulted in many new commissions both in the UK and internationally, including work in London, South Africa, Australia and Egypt. In 1927-8 he was employed by Crittall Windows to build their works village Silver End in Essex in the Art Deco style.

In 1930, another Scottish architect, Francis Lorne became a partner in the firm, and under the name Sir John Burnet, Tait and Lorne, the practice became one of the most influential architects' firms in Britain.

Tait and Lorne began to pursue a more Modernist architectural direction, and their work on the Royal Masonic Hospital at Ravenscourt (1930–3) won the RIBA Gold Medal for the best building of 1933. While the commissions slowed down during economic downturn of the early 1930s, they used the available time to publish a highly influential book, The Information Book of Sir John Burnet, Tait & Lorne (1933). In 1936 Sir Cecil M Weir, convenor of the Scottish Development Council, appointed him Chief Architect of the Empire Exhibition, Scotland 1938, selecting Bellahouston Park in Glasgow as the site, conceiving the master-plan and designing most of its 100 buildings assisted by a panel of young architects chosen by him. It attracted 12.8 million visitors.

== Later years ==
The outbreak of the Second World War cut Tait's career prematurely short. St Andrew's House, Edinburgh, (built for the former Scottish Office and from 1999 the headquarters of the Scottish Government) was completed shortly after the outbreak of war in 1939, leaving much of the proposed interior decoration incomplete. From 1940 to 1942 he worked as Director of Standardisation at the Ministry of Works. He retired from the partnership in 1952, and the practice was taken on by his eldest son, Gordon. Thomas Tait continued in the capacity of consultant to the firm until his death in 1954 at the age of 72. An English Heritage blue plaque erected in 2006 commemorates Tait at Gates House, at Wyldes Close in Hampstead Garden Suburb. Tait made modifications to the house as his own residence in 1930.

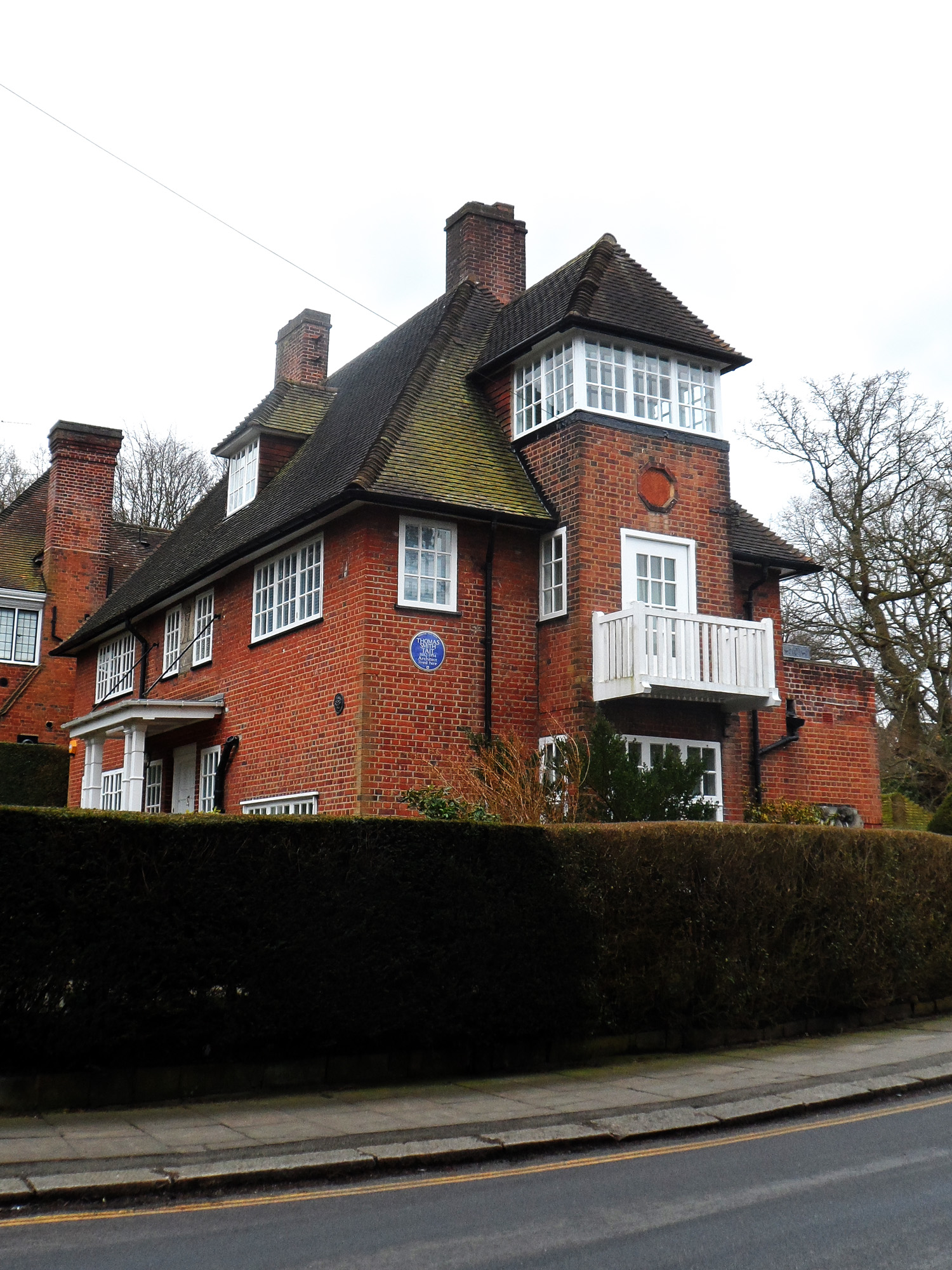
Gates House, Tait's residence at Wyldes Close in Hampstead Garden Suburb

== Notable works ==
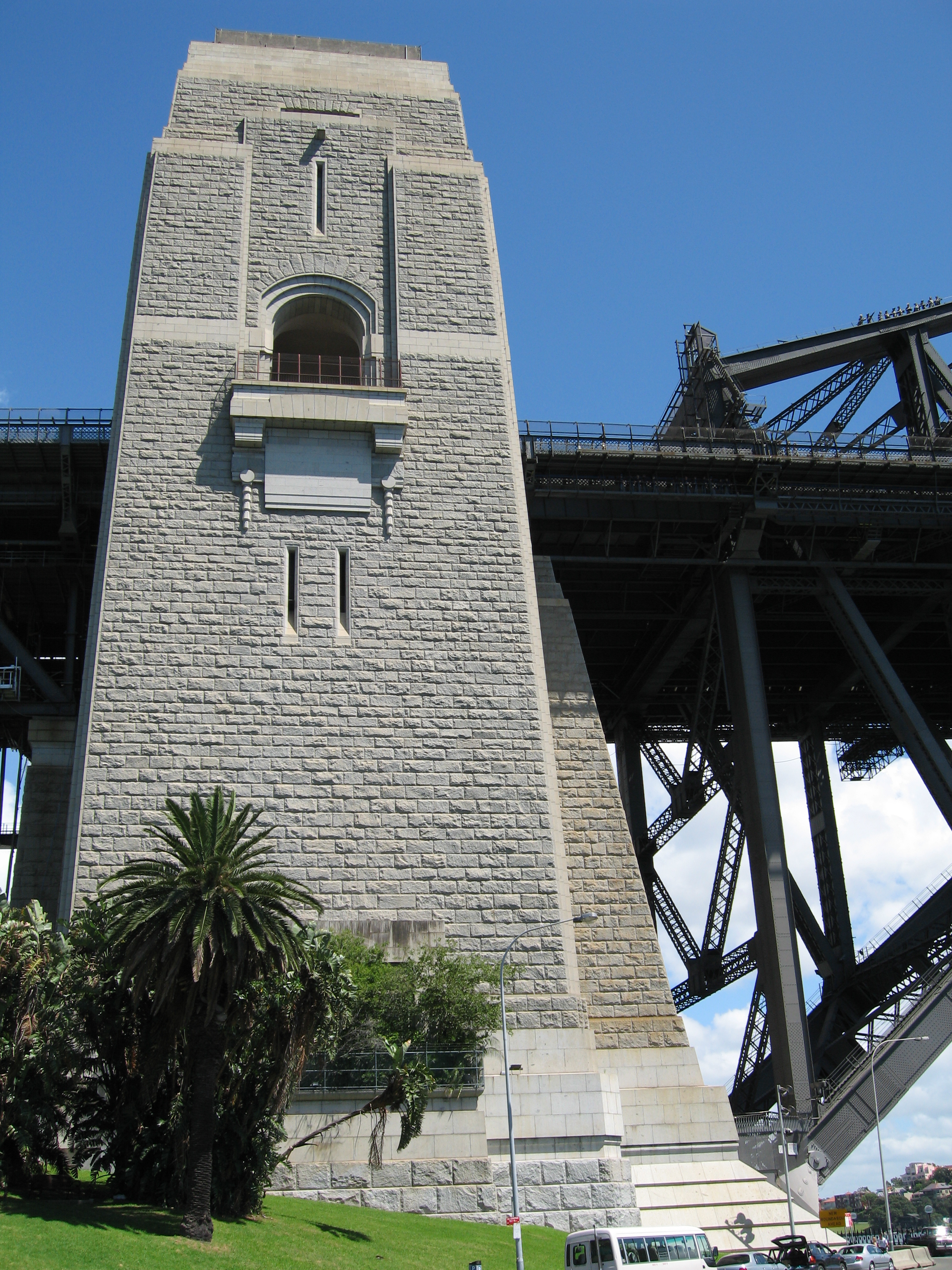
A pylon on Sydney Harbour Bridge

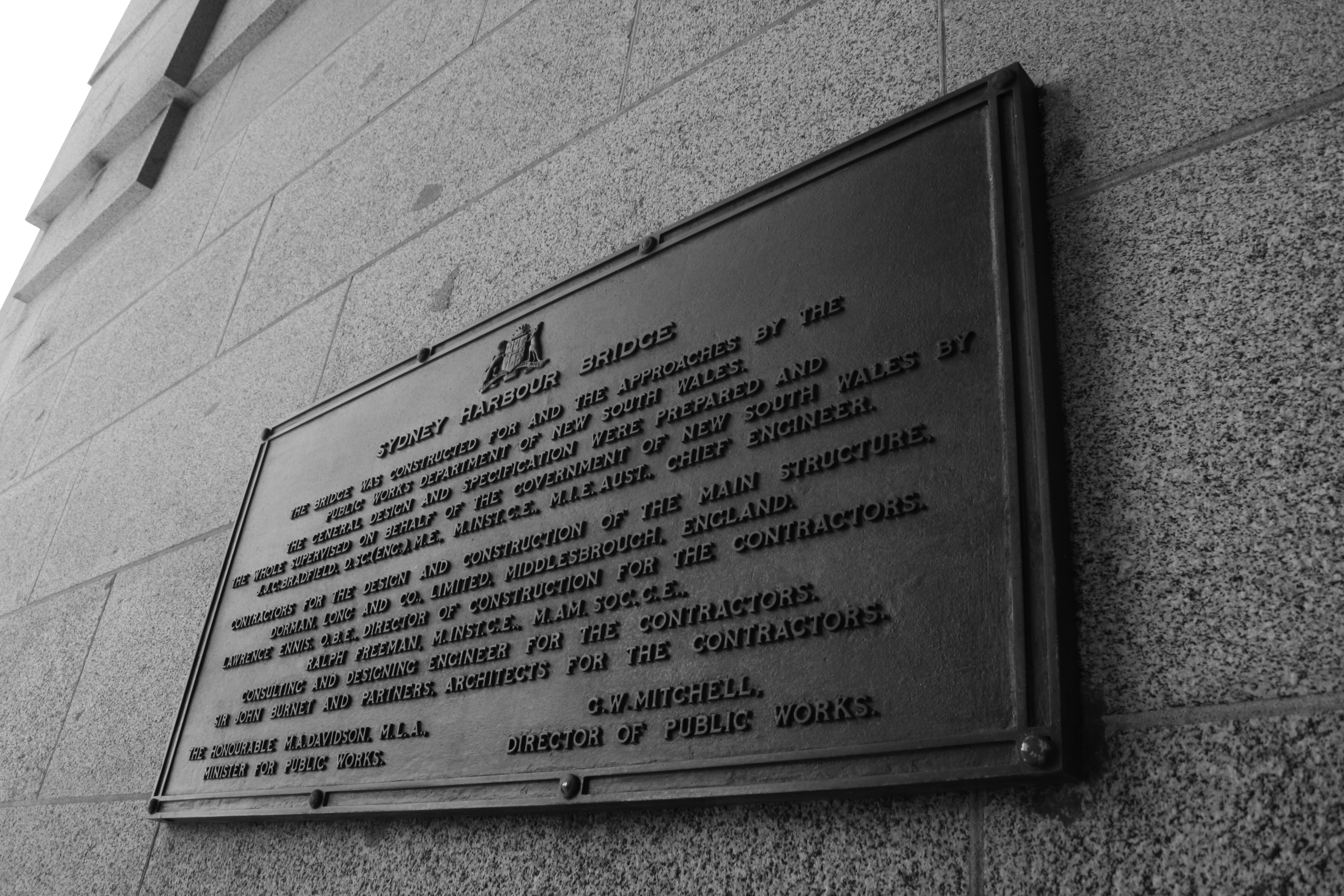
A plaque on Sydney Harbour Bridge marks the involvement of John Burnet & Partners, Tait's employer, in its construction

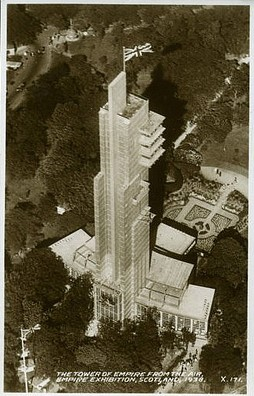
1938 Festival Tower aerial Empire Exhibition postcard Bellahouston Park, Glasgow

Tait's architectural works were mostly executed as an employee of John Burnet & Son, or as a partner in Sir John Burnet & Partners, later Burnet, Tait & Lorne.

=== Public buildings ===
Tait is credited with the design of a number of notable buildings in London and internationally, including: Adelaide House (1920–5) on the River Thames, London; the Daily Telegraph Building in Fleet Street office (1927–28), London; later phases of the Selfridges building (1926–29), Oxford Street, London; St Andrew's House in Edinburgh; and the pylons for Sydney Harbour Bridge. Tait collaborated with James Lomax-Simpson (1882–1977) on the design and construction of Unilever House (1930–33) near Blackfriars Bridge, London.

Tait was also involved in judging a number of architectural competitions, acting as the assessor for competitions to design the De La Warr Pavilion at Bexhill-on-Sea, and Kirkcaldy Town Hall.

=== War memorials ===
Following the First World War, he won a number of commissions to design war memorials, often in collaboration with sculptors such as Charles Sargeant Jagger. Both Tait and Jagger collaborated on the Great Western Railway War Memorial which stands today in Paddington Station, London (1992), and the (now destroyed) Port Tewfik War Memorial near Suez, Egypt.

=== The Moderne style ===
Tait's acclaimed Royal Masonic Hospital at Ravenscourt Park in London (later the Ravenscourt Park Hospital) won him a RIBA award for the best building of 1933. This Moderne brick edifice features nautical-style curved sun porches and balconies, elongated sculpted figures atop the door pilaster. It has been likened to Willem Marinus Dudok's Hilversum Town Hall of 1931.

Burnet, Tait & Lorne continued to build in the curved Streamline Moderne style, as evidenced in Tait's whitewashed Hawkhead Hospital for Infectious Diseases in Paisley (1932), which also features curved, nautical balconies and railings, streamlined corners and horizontal bands.

=== Tait's Tower ===
Tait is perhaps best remembered for his contributions to the design and master planning for the Empire Exhibition, Scotland 1938, held in Bellahouston Park, Glasgow. Tait was appointed as head of a team of nine architects, which included Basil Spence and Jack Coia. Tait's vision was of a modernist, utopian future, and the Empire Exhibition was the largest collection of modern architecture built in United Kingdom in the first half of the 20th century. Dominating the whole exhibition was "The Tower of Empire", designed by Tait himself. The 300-feet-high tower was erected on the summit of the hill in the centre of the park and had three observation balconies, each capable of carrying 200 people.

=== Private houses ===
Tait is also credited with the design of Chelsea House, built 1934, in Belgravia. This rotunda-shaped building stands on the corner of Lowndes Street and Cadogan Place on the former site of the 1874 home of the Earl of Cadogan, also called Chelsea House. Besides commissions for individual private dwellings, Tait was also commissioned to design a housing estate at Silver End, Essex, for the industrialist Francis Henry Crittall as part of his model village project in 1928. The houses are white with flat roofs and steel window frames.

=== Evacuation centres ===
In 1939 the British Government passed the Camps Act which established the National Camps Corporation as a body to design and build residential camps for young people that could provide opportunities for outdoor learning and also act as evacuation centres in the event of War. Tait was responsible for the design of the buildings which included accommodation for over 200 children and staff, recreational halls, washblocks and a dining hall/kitchen complex. These Camps were replicated in over 30 different rural locations around the country. During the war years, these acted as safe refuges for city children from Nazi bombing raids. After the war the ownership of the sites was transferred to the local authorities. Over the years most of these sites have been lost, but the best preserved example today is Sayers Croft which is located at Ewhurst, Surrey. The dining hall and kitchen complex is protected as a Grade II listed building because of the importance of Tait's work, and because of the painted murals depicting the life of the evacuees.

=== Gallery ===
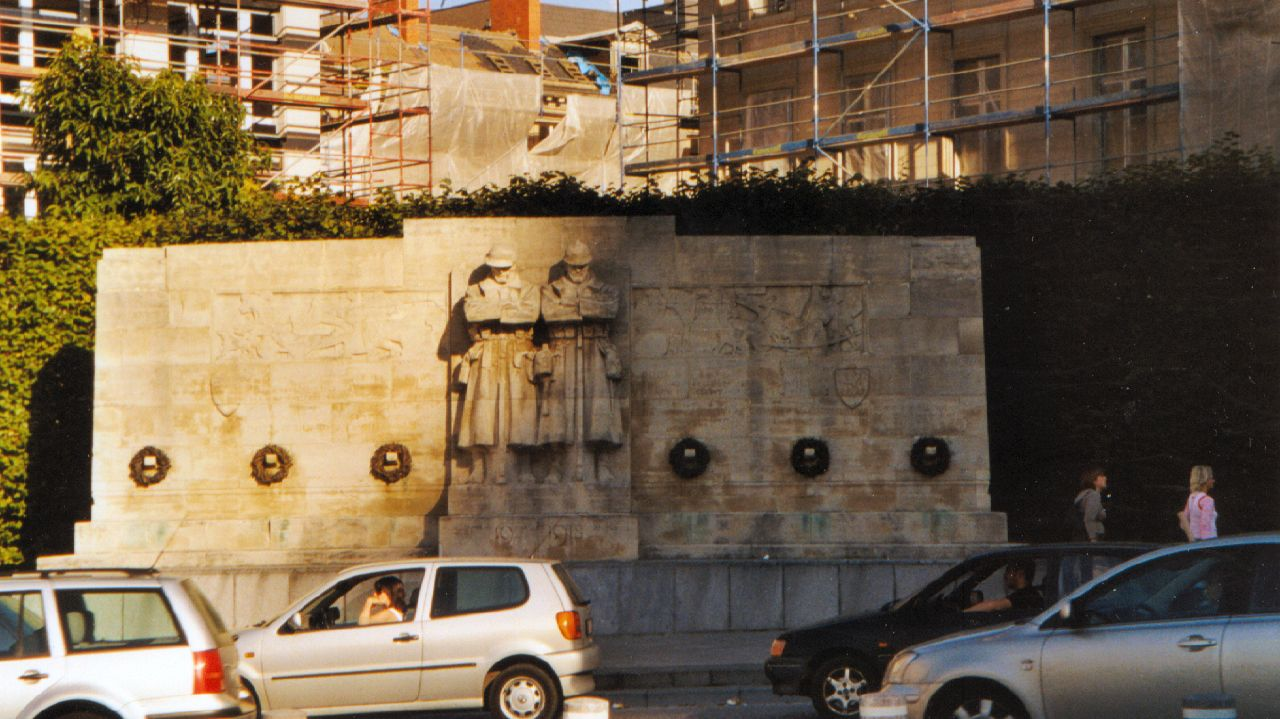
The Brussels war memorial

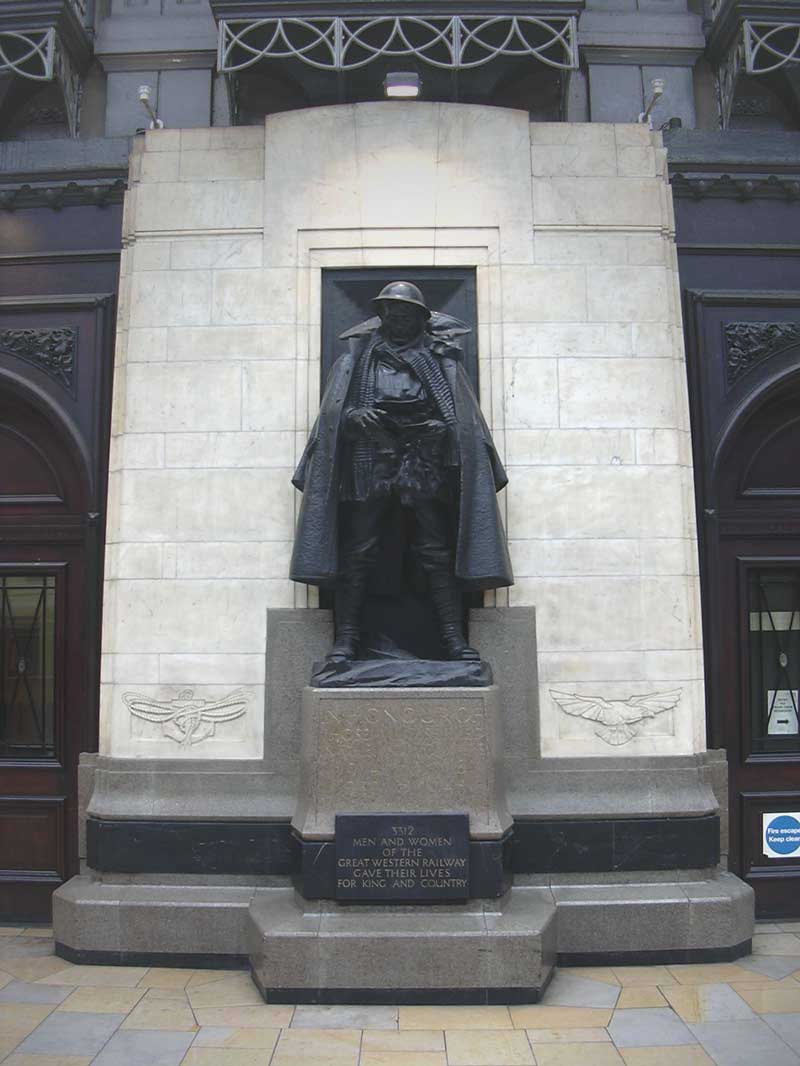
The GWR War Memorial, Paddington Station

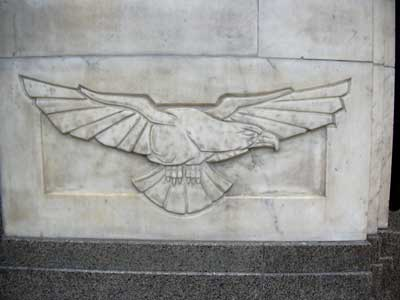
The GWR War Memorial, Paddington Station

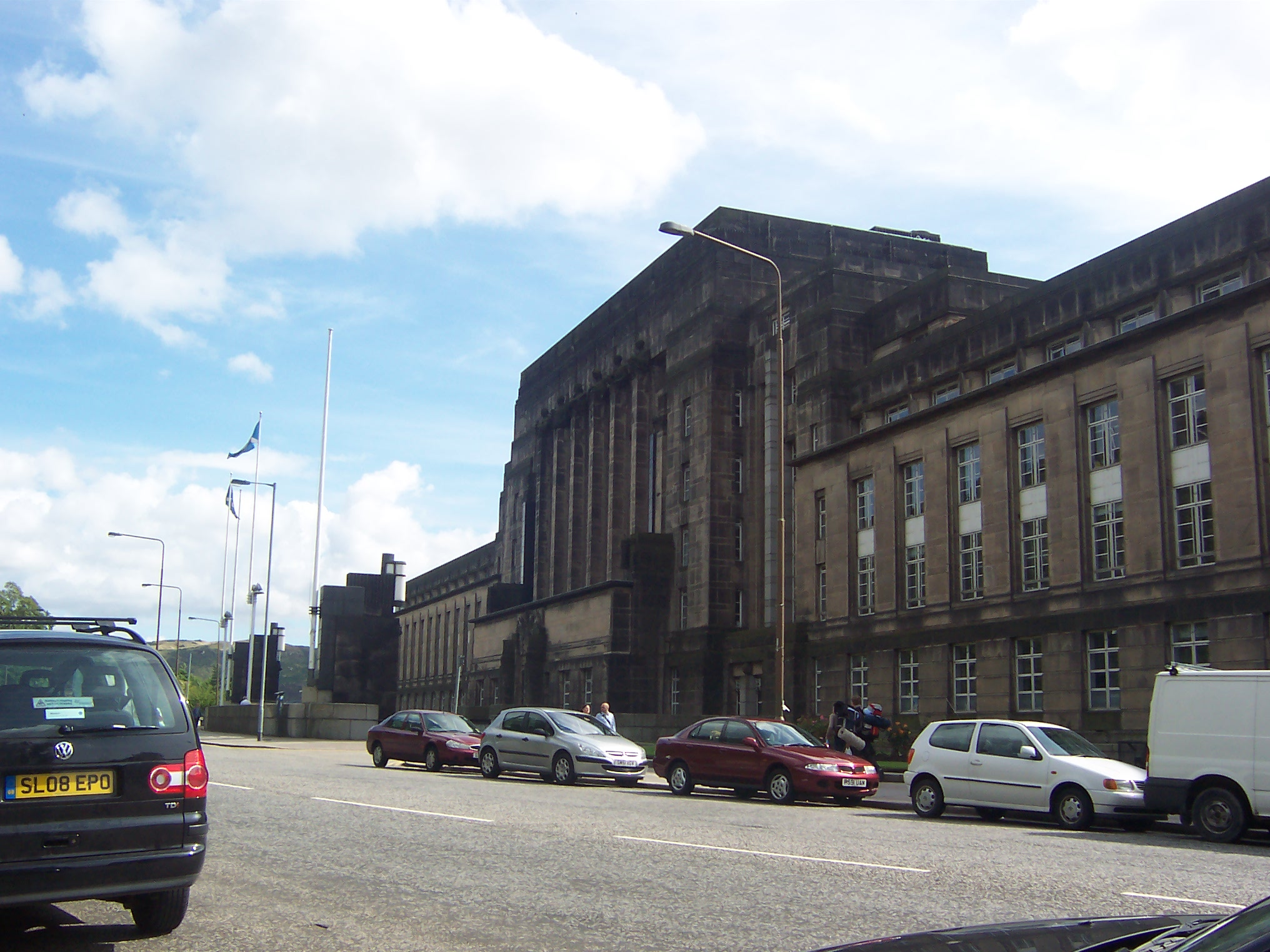
St Andrew's House, Edinburgh

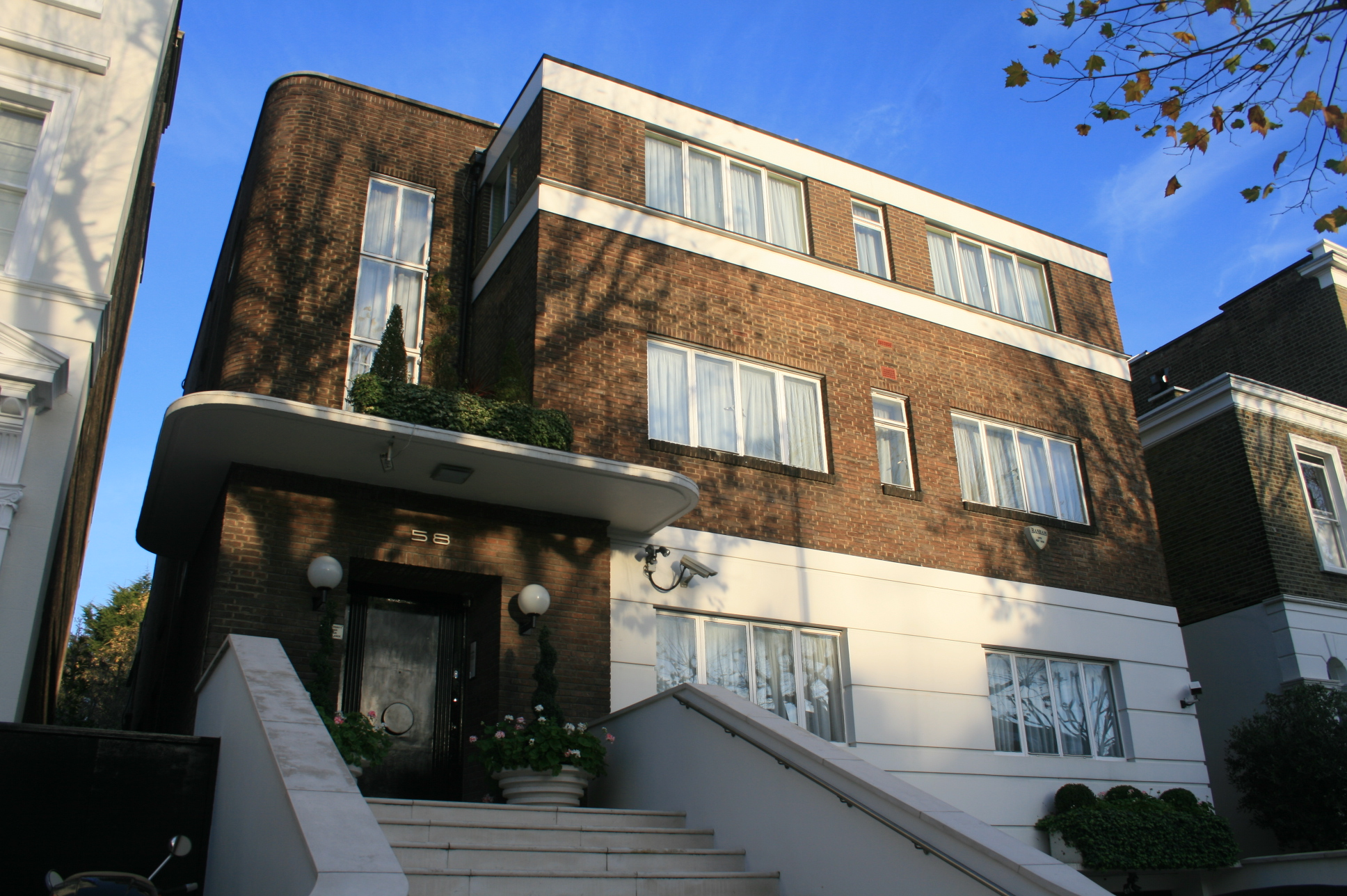
De Casa Maury house, Maida Vale

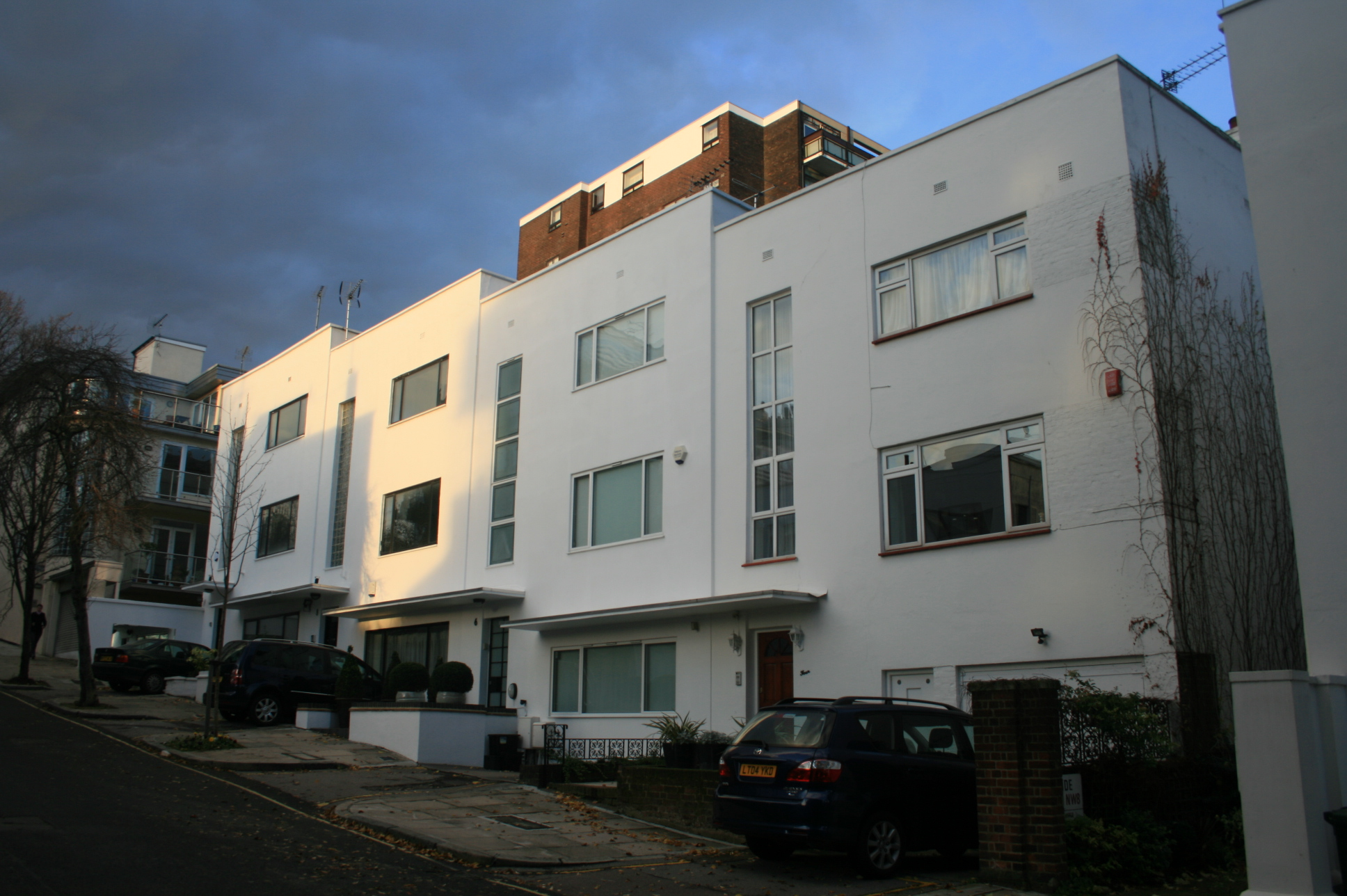
Terrace of houses, St John's Wood

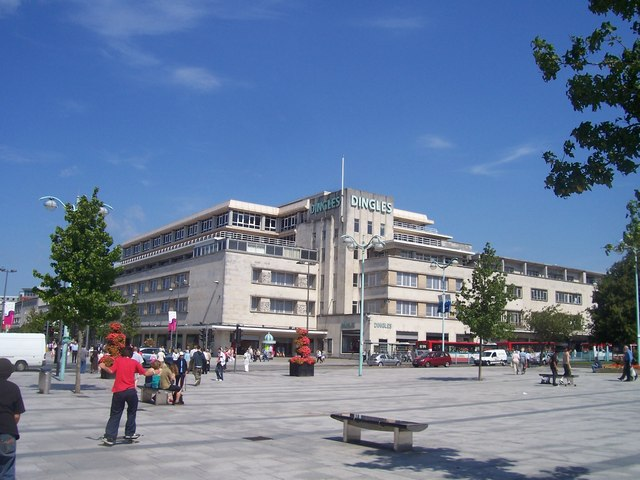
1949-50 Department Store in Plymouth, Devon

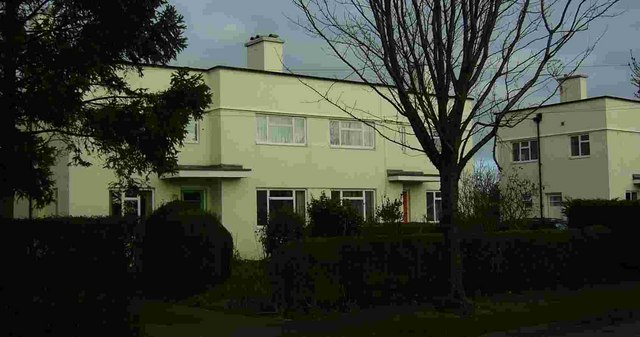
Houses in Silver End Village, Essex
