= Tait Tower =

Tower in Glasgow, Scotland

Coordinates: 55.84547°N 4.31729°W

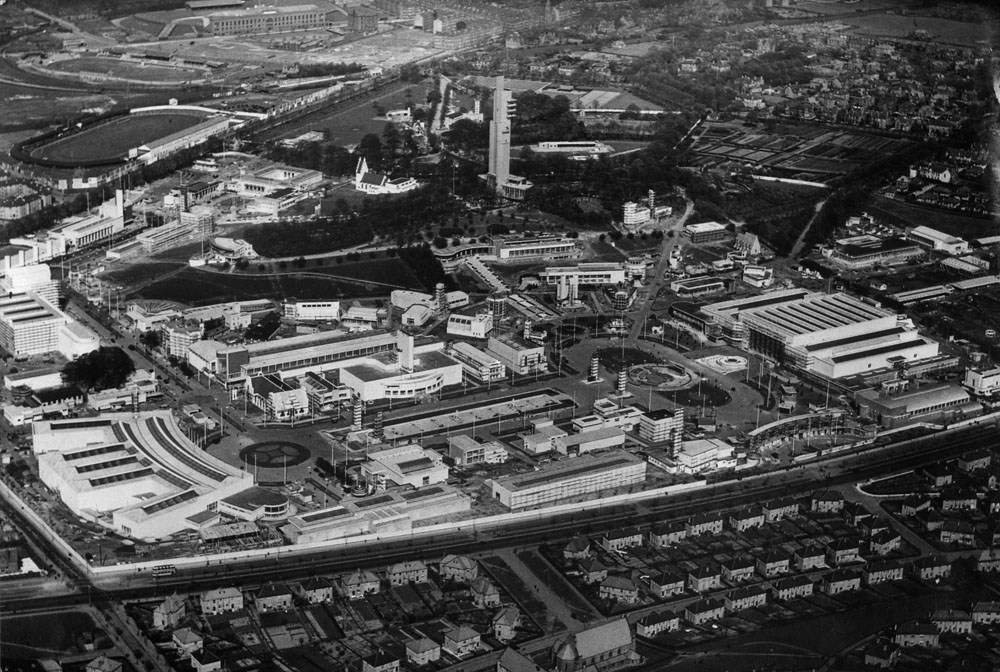
Empire Exhibition from the air, with the Tait Tower visible

Tait Tower (also known as Tait's Tower and officially as the Tower of Empire) was a tower in the art deco style constructed at the summit of Ibrox Hill in Bellahouston Park in Glasgow in Scotland as part of the Empire Exhibition, Scotland 1938.

It was designed by Thomas S. Tait, stood 300 feet (91 metres) high and had three separate observation decks which provided a view of the surrounding gardens and city. Due to both the height of the tower and the hill it was built on, it could be seen 100 miles (160 km) away. The tower was the centrepiece of the Empire Exhibition and its image featured on many of the souvenirs that could be bought at the exhibition site.

The Empire Exhibition took place at a time when Glasgow was the centre of British shipbuilding and engineering, and the materials – steel beams riveted together and clad in corrugated steel – were produced by Glasgow manufacturing plants. Tait's design and readily available materials made it possible for the tower to be constructed in only nine weeks.

The tower was dismantled in July 1939 after the exhibition closed. The foundations remain at Bellahouston Park.

Thomas' son Gordon Tait also worked on the project.

In December 2007, the Tait Tower was included in a 3D graphic reconstruction of the Empire Exhibition by the Digital Design Studio at Glasgow School of Art, sourced from contemporary photographs, film footage, sketches and drawings from the archive of the Mitchell Library.

== See also ==
- List of tallest buildings and structures in Glasgow
