= Empire Exhibition, Scotland =

1938 international exhibition in Glasgow, Scotland

Coordinates: 55°50′48″N 4°18′57″W

Empire Exhibition
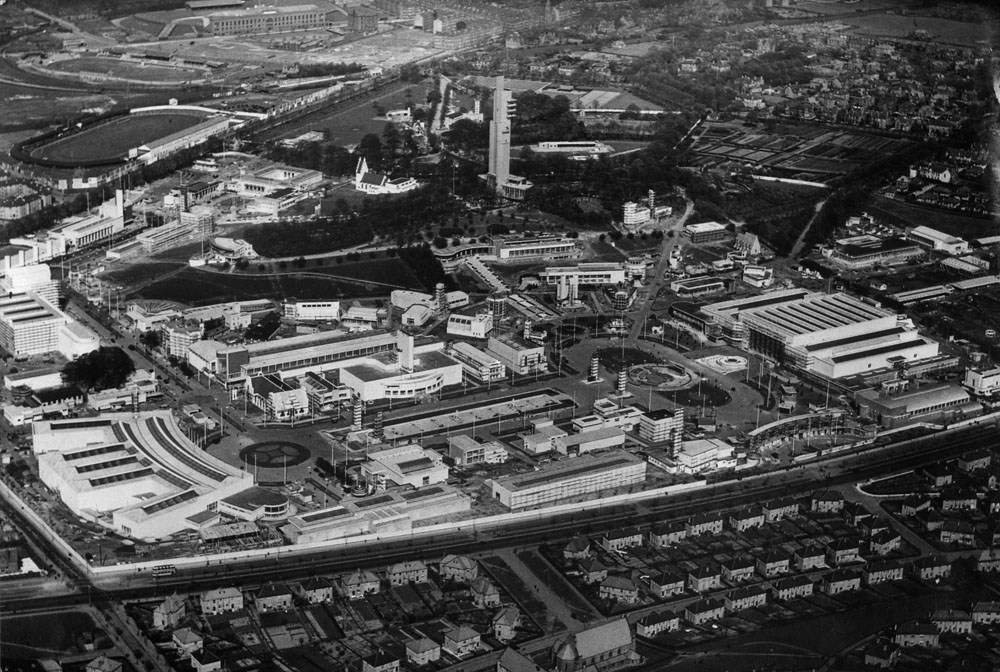
- The exhibition in Bellahouston Park, showing the Mosspark Boulevard entrance and on the hill the Festival Tower, with Ibrox Park in distance beyond Paisley Road West

Overview
- BIE-class: Unrecognized exposition
- Name: Empire Exhibition
- Building(s): Tait Tower
- Area: 145 acres (59 ha)
- Visitors: 12.8 million
- Organized by: Sir Cecil Weir was chair of the council of management and the administrative committee

Location
- Country: United Kingdom
- City: Glasgow
- Venue: Bellahouston Park

Timeline
- Opening: 3 May 1938
- Closure: 29 October 1938

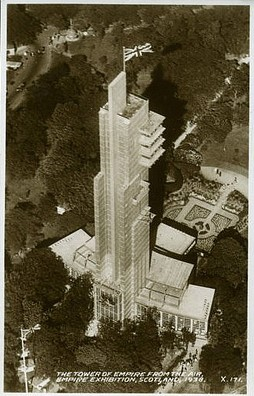
Festival Tower of the Empire Exhibition 1938 Glasgow

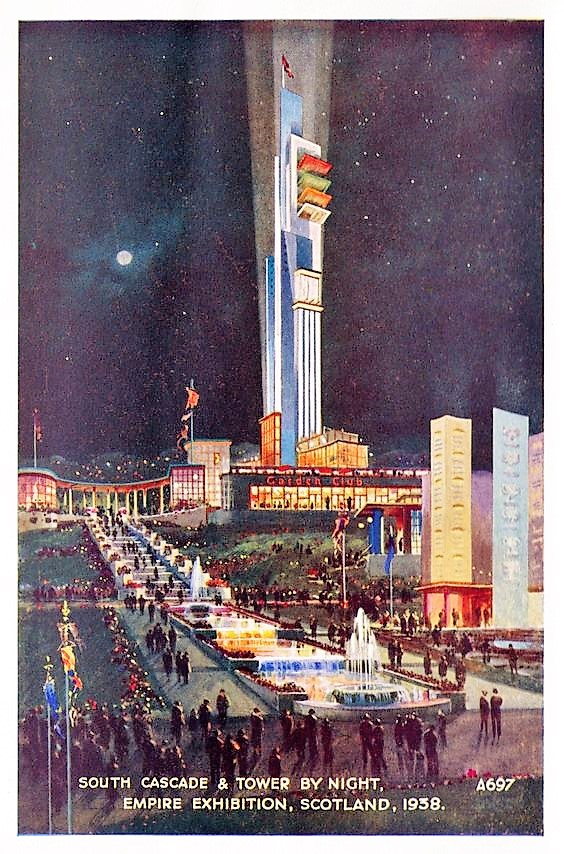
Night view of South Cascade at the Empire Exhibition 1938 in Bellahouston Park, Glasgow

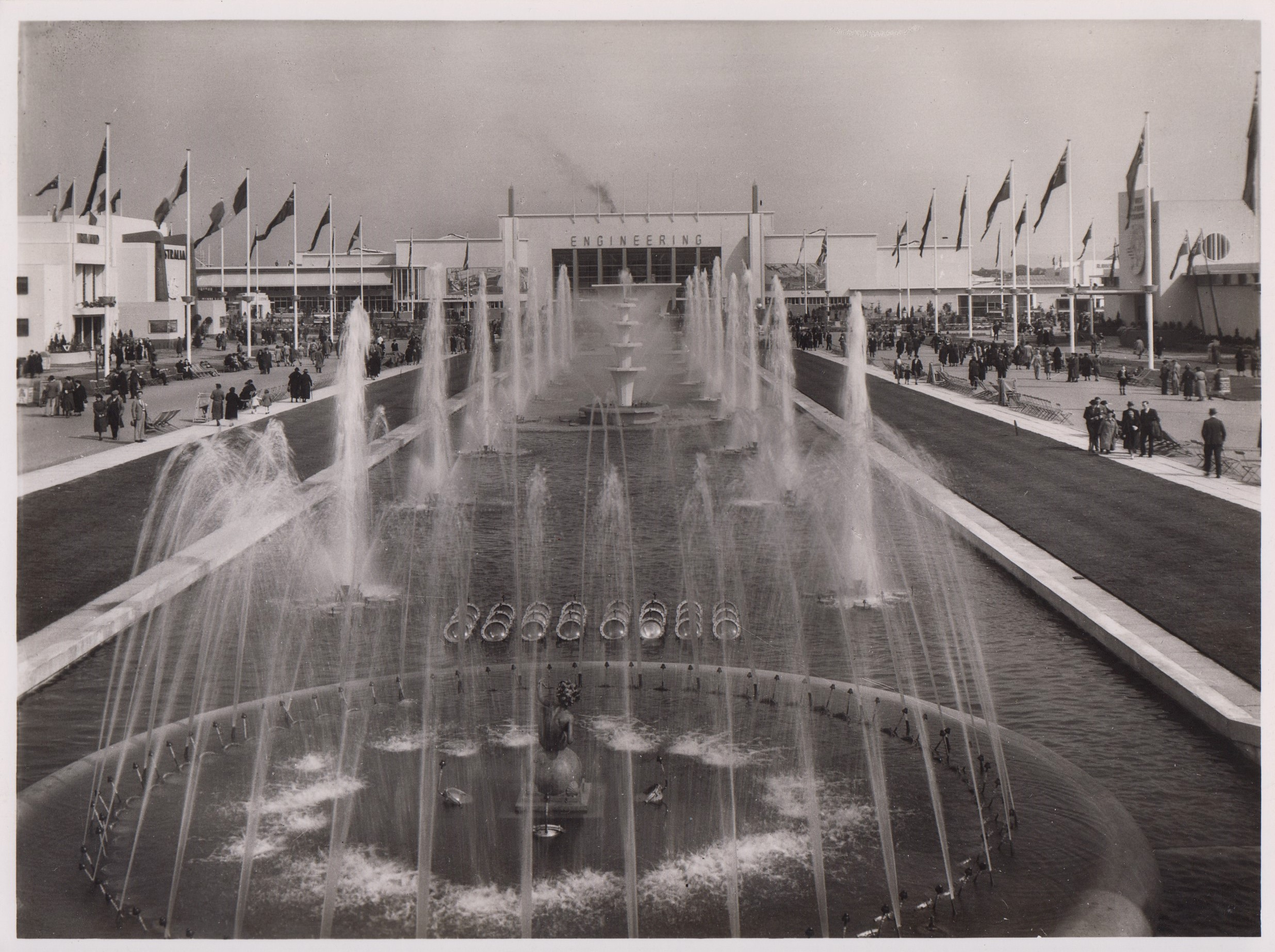
1938 Empire Exhibition fountains centre in front of the Palace of Engineering in Bellahouston Park, Glasgow

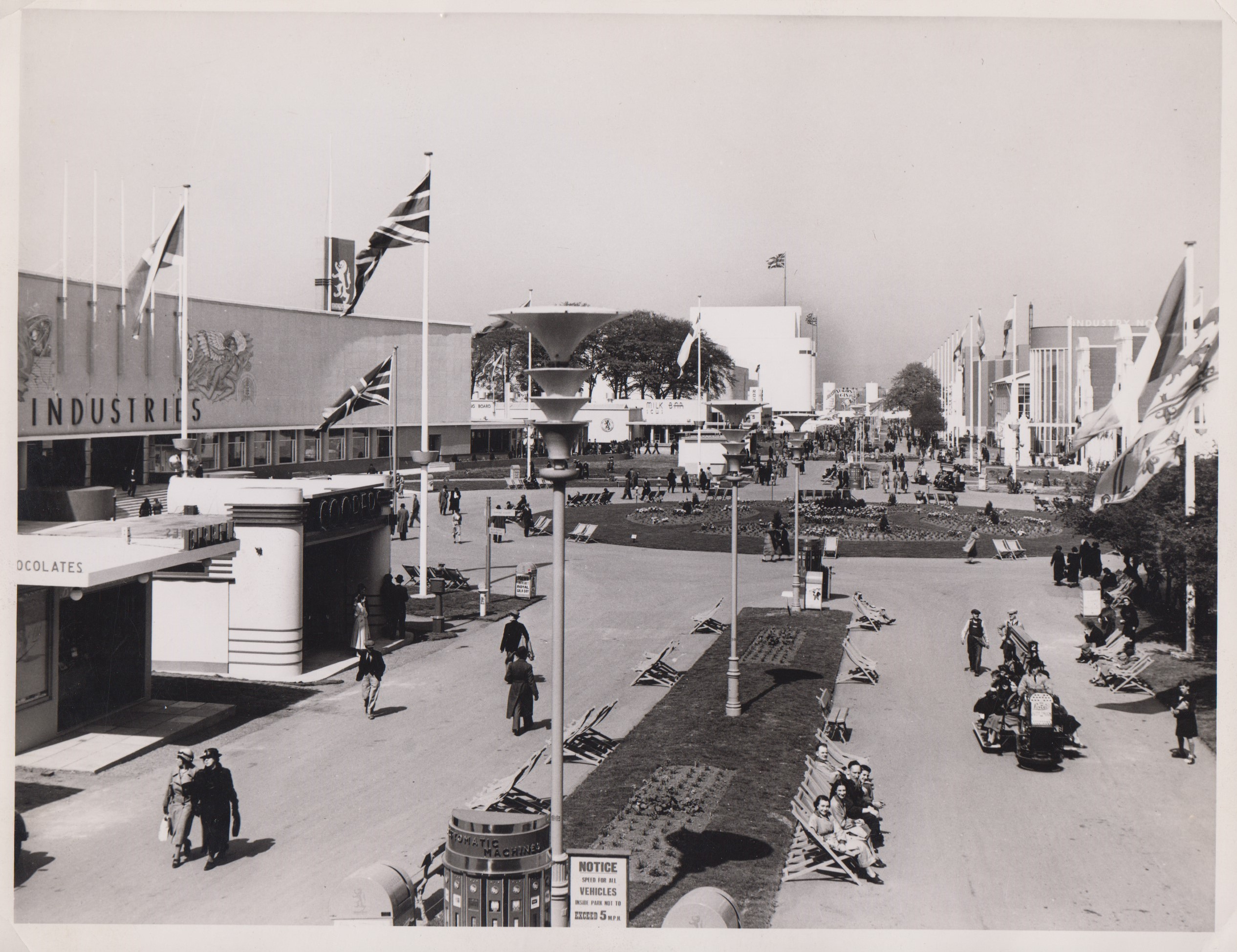
1938 Empire Exhibition view along Kingsway in Bellahouston Park, Glasgow, with the Palace of Industries on left and the United Kingdom Pavilion in middle distance.

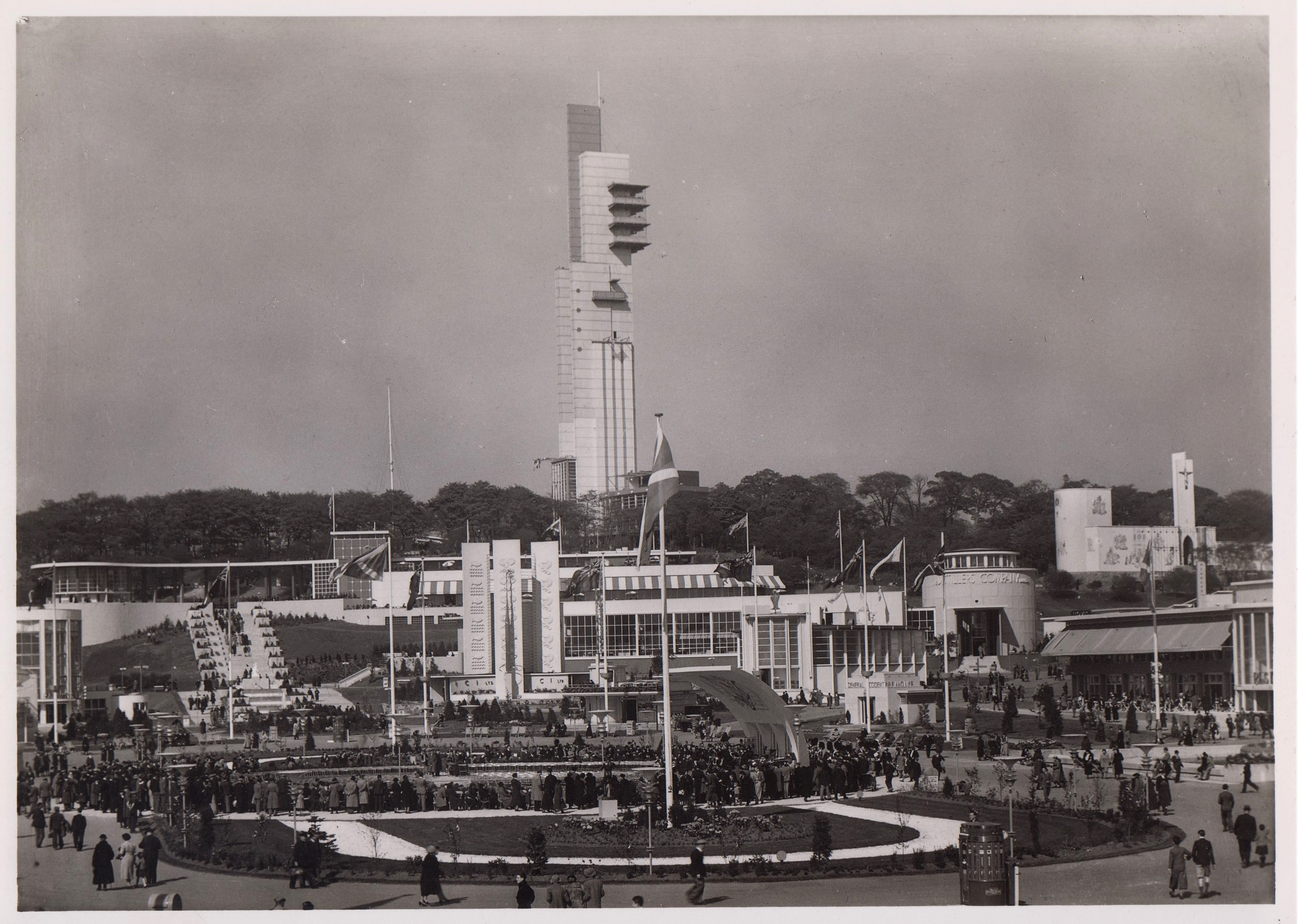
1938 Empire Exhibition view over the South Bandstand in Bellahouston Park, Glasgow, centre left the Garden Club, ICI Pavilion and others and Tait`s Tower overhead.

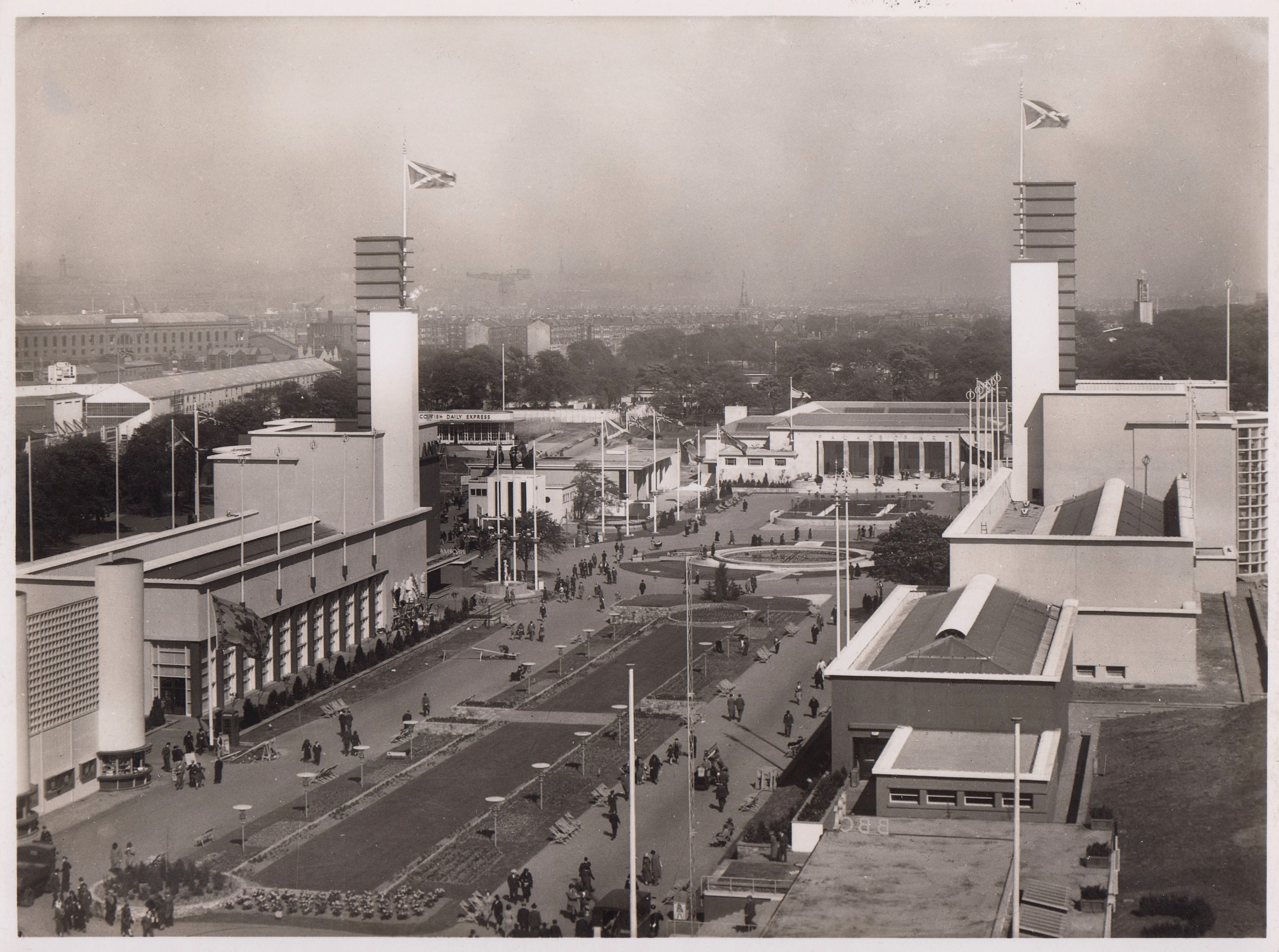
1938 Empire Exhibition view east over Scottish Avenue in Bellahouston Park, Glasgow, to the Scottish Pavilions and centre the Palace of Art, with Ibrox Park on distance left.

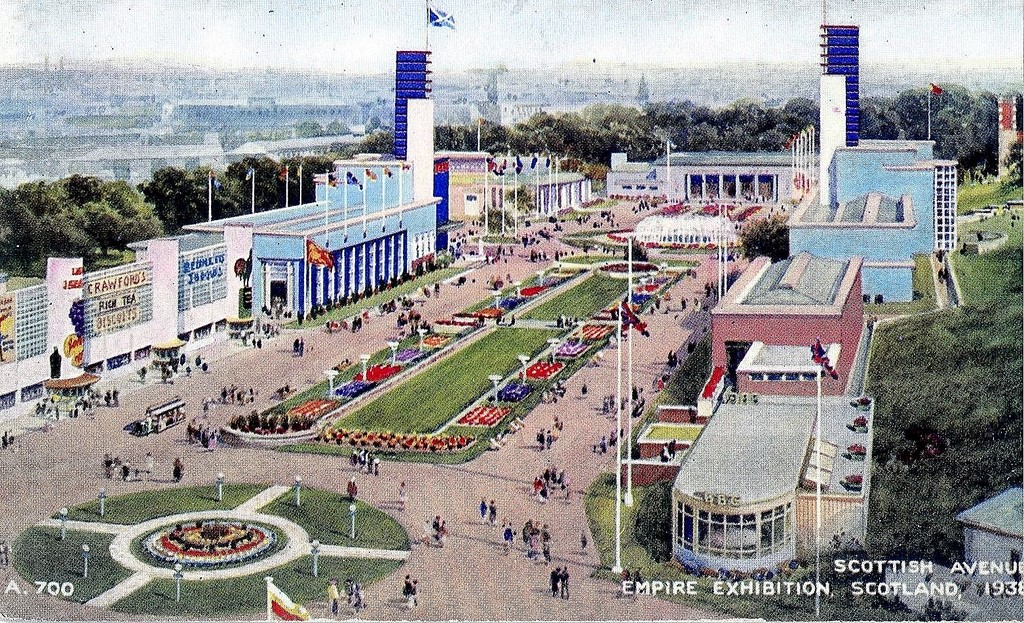
1938 Empire Exhibition, Glasgow colour postcard of the Scottish Avenue pavilions and the Palace of Art

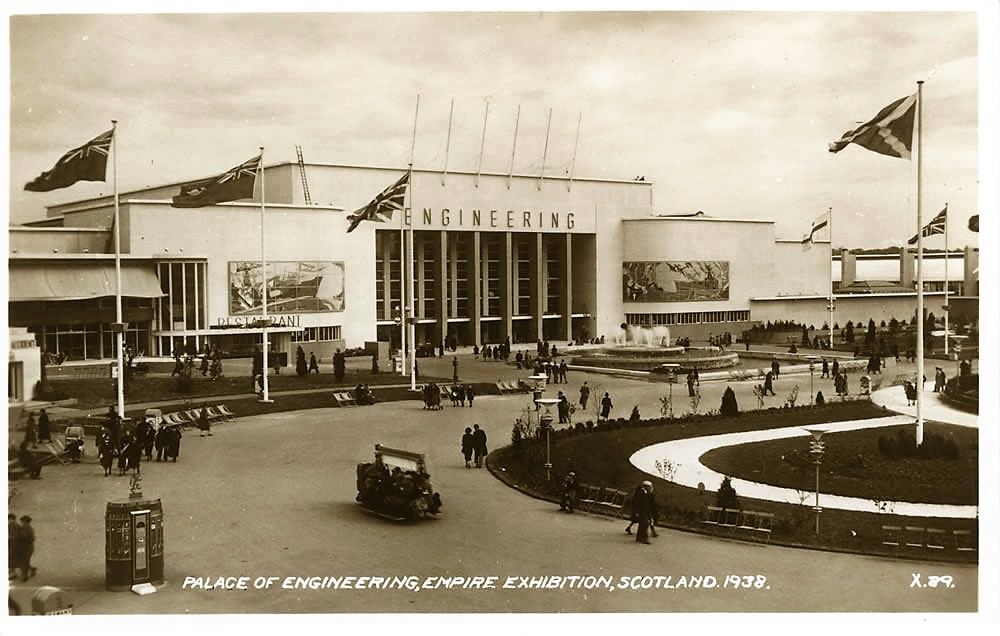
The Palace of Engineering at the Empire Exhibition 1938 in Bellahouston Park, Glasgow

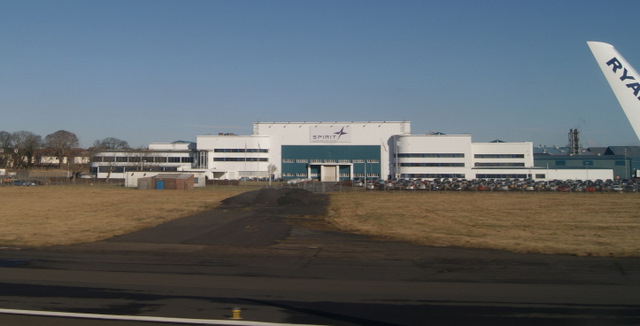
The factory building of Scottish Aviation, Prestwick, which still exists today, was formerly the Palace of Engineering at the 1938 Empire Exhibition in Bellahouston Park. It is now owned by Spirit AeroSystems.

The Empire Exhibition was an international Exhibition held at Bellahouston Park in Glasgow, Scotland, from May to December 1938.

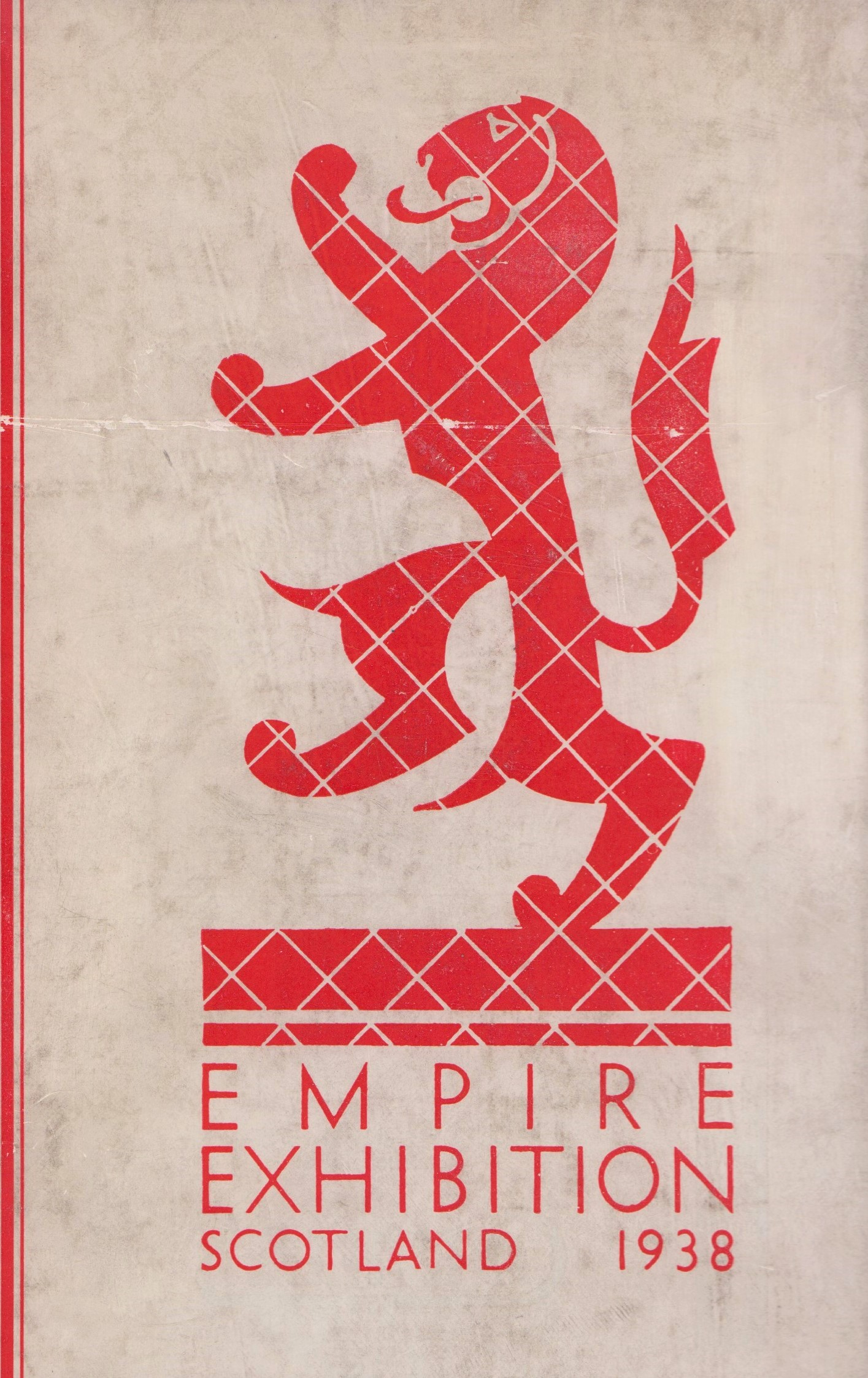
Postcard in 1938 of the public logo of the Empire Exhibition held in Glasgow

The Exhibition offered a chance to showcase and boost the economy of Scotland and celebrate Empire trade and developments, recovering from the depression of the 1930s. It also marked fifty years since Glasgow's first great exhibition, the International Exhibition (1888) held at Kelvingrove Park. It was the second British Empire Exhibition, the first held at Wembley Park, London, in 1924 and 1925.

Its function was similar to the first National Exhibition in Paris in 1798 and to the first International Exhibition, the Great Exhibition in London in 1851, attended by 6 million visitors.

It was declared open by King George VI and Queen Elizabeth on 3 May 1938 at the Opening Ceremony in Ibrox Stadium, attended by 146,000 people.

In addition to the Royal Patrons and the Honorary Presidents representing governments and institutions here and in the Dominions, the Exhibition President was the Earl of Elgin, President of the Scottish Development Council, and initiators of the exhibition.

== The Exhibition Objects ==
The exhibition promoted five Objects, the fifth being included to counter the thinking in fascist countries in Europe and Asia:

1. To illustrate the progress of the British Empire at home and overseas.
2. To show the resources and potentialities of the United Kingdom and the Empire overseas to the new generation.
3. To stimulate Scottish work and production and to direct attention to Scotland`s historical and scenic attractions.
4. To foster Empire trade and a closer friendship among the British Commonwealth of Nations peoples.
5. To emphasize to the world the peaceful aspirations of the peoples of the British Empire.

== The event ==
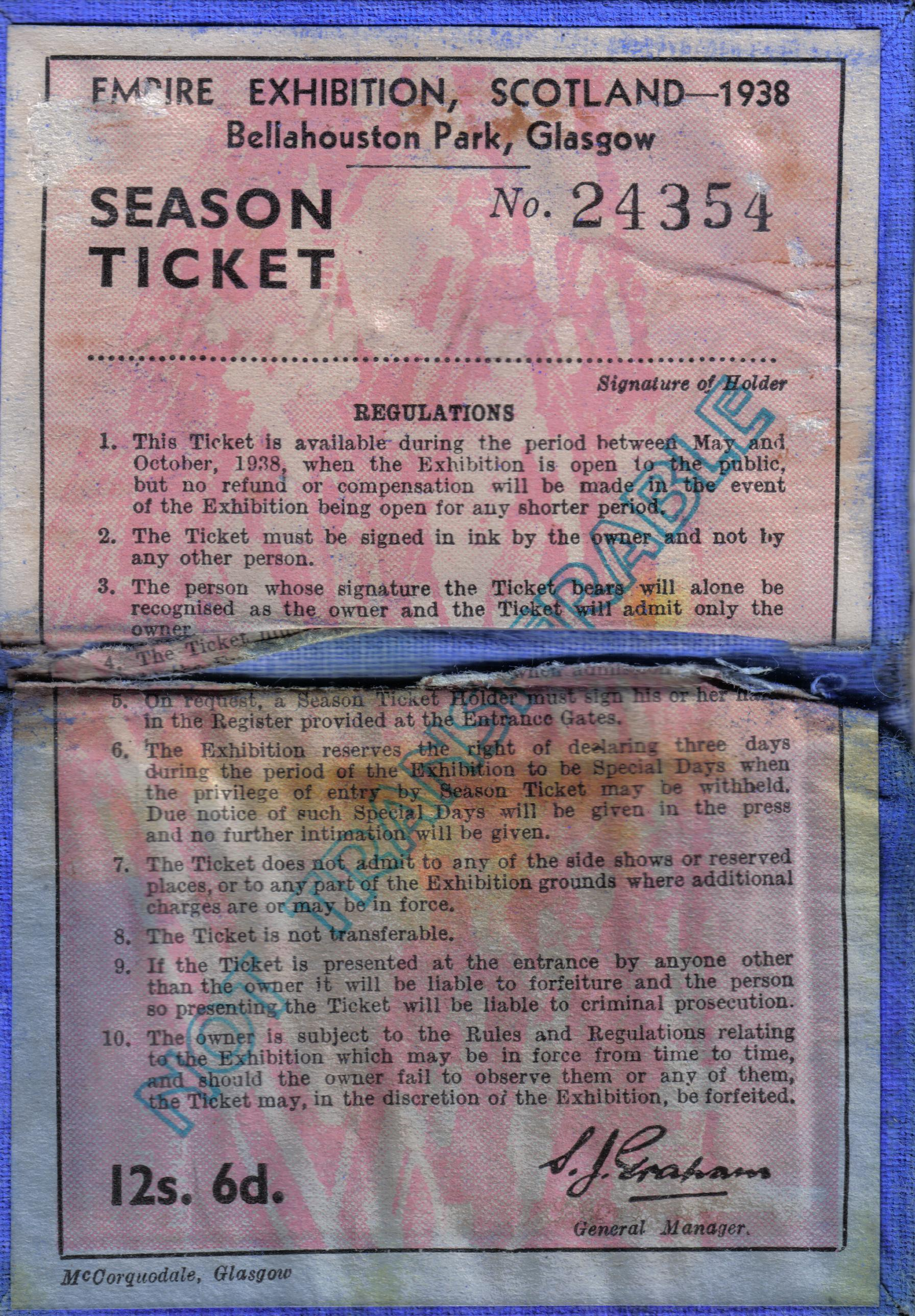
A season ticket pass

Although 1938 was one of the wettest summers on record, the Exhibition attracted 12,800,000 visitors despite not being open on a Sunday.

Exhibition pavilions and leisure and recreation buildings were erected on the site. The two largest commercial pavilions were the Palace of Engineering and the Palace of Industry, and countries in the British Empire contributed their national pavilions. The Exhibition was master-planned by Thomas S. Tait, who headed a team of architects, which included Basil Spence and Jack Coia.

The most prominent structure was the Tait Tower (officially the Tower of Empire), 300 feet in height, which on the hill made it 470 feet (140 m) high. Although it could have remained as a permanent monument after the exhibition, the tower was handed over to the British Army after the exhibition ended and was demolished in June 1939. The rumour that the structure was demolished to avoid it being used as a reference point by German bombers is an urban myth. The nearby Gilmorehill tower at Glasgow University could have been used for the same purpose, but it was not demolished.

== Origins ==
The idea of the exhibition came from the Scottish Development Council, created in the 1930s under the aegis of its founder chairman, Sir James Lithgow, industrialist and Britain`s foremost shipbuilder. Cecil Weir, convenor of the Council`s general purposes committee, suggested at Lithgow's behest and gave shape to the idea. In 1936, his report and proposals were announced. After meeting government bodies, industries, and manufacturers in a few months, the Empire Exhibition project was officially launched in October 1936 in the Merchants House, Glasgow.

Glasgow Corporation leased to the Exhibition 145 acres (59 hectares) of the sylvan and well-wooded Bellahouston Park, free of rent, leaving them 25 acres (10 ha) of city nursery. The oval-shaped hill in the park is ideal for the Festival Tower, and the fountains and water cascade on both sides. Nearby, Ibrox Park stadium, home of Rangers F.C., was made available as the venue for the Exhibition`s programme of sporting events and competitions.

Another Council initiative of the time was the creation of the Scottish Industrial Estates corporation chaired by Sir Steven Bilsland, bread manufacturer and chairman of the Union Bank of Scotland. Scotland`s first new estate, Hillington Industrial Estate, just a mile or so away, would soon start construction. The new body would expand across the country and, in 1979, merged with the new Scottish Development Agency.

While national and international committees were formed to include as many as possible in buildings, science and technology, accommodation, publicity, film, arts, entertainments and events, the council of management and administrative committee took most of the strain. Both were chaired by Sir Cecil Weir (knighted in June 1938). His colleagues knew him as wee Cecil and the public soon knew the exhibition as Cecil`s Exhibition.

The Scottish Development Council "inner cabinet" of four met almost daily, comprising, Sir Cecil Weir, Exhibition Convenor; Norman Hird, Convenor of Finance, general manager of the Union Bank of Scotland; James Barr, Convenor of Buildings, civil engineer and surveyor; and Sir Steven Bilsland, Convenor of the Publicity & Contacts Committee. Captain J. Sidney Graham of the Government`s Exhibition Department was appointed general manager.

== Sir Cecil Weir ==
The enterprising Cecil M Weir, fluent in French and German, was chairman of the international leather firm Schrader, Mitchell & Weir, headquartered in Glasgow, from where his elder brother John Weir had become UK Controller of Leather in WWI. An active member of the Liberal Party, he advocated social and economic reform. He would become president of the Glasgow Chamber of Commerce and later a founder of the Institute of Production Engineers.

He was appointed the first Civil Defence Commissioner for Western Scotland, receiving his sealed orders at the Exhibition on 25 September 1938, five days before Chamberlain arrived back from Munich. Throughout WWII, he was one of the five UK Industrial & Export Council members.

He was also made Controller of Factory & Storage Premises and then Director General of Equipment & Stores with supreme control over all production. He introduced the policy of the Concentration of British Industry, which freed up 70 million square feet of premises and 260,000 male workers for active service, resulting in greatly improved efficiency and production and the training of women workers. Of his many initiatives here and jointly with his American counterpart, Weir introduced the mass production of penicillin, essential to the survival of Allied service personnel; industrial-scale production of the pressed-steel jerrican for the Allies, based on the Nazi invention, the war being global and fast moving in contrast to trench-warfare; and ahead of peacetime conceived the scheme of Demobilisation Clothing for 9 million service men and women, and with no distinction for rank.

In April 1942, at a meeting of the Post-War Export Committee of the Department of Overseas Trade, he was appointed chair of a Sub-Committee on Industrial Design and Art in Industry (the Weir Committee). Its ensuing report is generally viewed as the administrative catalyst of what became the Council of Industrial Design, now known as the Design Council, which the War Cabinet established as part of a strategy that placed the recovery of export markets as the most urgent priority of a post-war reconstruction programme. The formation of the Council was announced in the House of Commons by Hugh Dalton, president of the Board of Trade, in December 1944, with Design Centres opening in the post-war years in major conurbations.

In 1944 and 1945, he landed in France and the Low Countries, behind the Allied advance, as joint head of the Weir-Green Commission of the UK and USA, assessing how best to restart the industries of these countries, to support the war effort and their liberation, with willing and freed people.

From 1946 to 1949, he was President of the Economic Commission headquartered in Berlin and Hanover under the British Military Governor of occupied Germany. With a staff of some 7,000, Sir Cecil Weir had absolute power over the population, industries, and commerce in what would become West Germany with a new capita, Bonn, where he had completed his schooling. On his return to the UK, he became chairman of the Dollar Exports Board and, among other companies, the chairman of the first British computer manufacturing company, ICT.

== Design and construction ==
The highly respected and unassuming Thomas Smith Tait[1] of Sir John Burnet, Tait and Partners as Chief Architect was masterly appointed. Paisley-born Tait had no experience with previous exhibitions but was now a senior partner in the international firm of Sir John Burnet, Tait, and Lorne of London and Scotland.

He devised the master plan with the consulting engineers Crouch & Hogg of Glasgow and determined that the building style would be Art Deco. He designed most of the 100 buildings. A condition of his appointment was that he would also engage and be assisted by members of the younger set of Scottish architects. Those chosen were: Margaret Brodie, Jack Coia, Esme Gordon, Alistair MacDonald, Thomas W Marwick, Mervyn Noad, Launcelot Ross, Basil Spence, Dr Colin Sinclair, and James Taylor Thomson. Many had experience of the Burnet firm or American experience.

The British and the Dominion governments, Canada, Australia, New Zealand, South Africa, Burma and Ireland, and the Colonial governments could appoint their architect for their pavilions, assisted by the guidance of Tommy Tait. West Africa, Southern Rhodesia, and East Africa had pavilions, and fifteen other Colonies[13] came together in a composite Colonial Pavilion.

The largest national pavilion was the ultra-modern British Government Pavilion designed by Herbert Rowse of Liverpool. In addition to the main Industrial and Engineering Halls, Commonwealth pavilions, and cultural exhibits, at least sixty-two pavilions were erected by famous commercial and industrial concerns. The Empire Exhibition had the first-ever major dancing water fountains built for its lakes and cascades. They were also floodlit and changed colours.

Sir Cecil Weir records, "Lord Inverclyde, chairman of Cunard, toured round the playgrounds and holiday resorts of Britain in search of what we wanted, the masses of restaurants to suit every purse, the bandstands, the fashion shows in the special theatre in the Women of Empire Pavilion designed by Margaret Brodie, and the innumerable events which took place in the Ibrox Park Stadium, including a week of a Services Tournament, similar to the Royal Military, giving a character to this Exhibition which was comprehensive and unique". Young Billy Butlin was selected to construct and operate the exhibition's Amusement Park, extending over 12 acres (4.9 ha). Of the many restaurants, including the Treetops Restaurant of the Tower, the de-luxe Atlantic Restaurant on the ridge of the hill was built and operated by the Anchor Line, designed as the bow and superstructure of a liner.

The first sod was turned in March 1937, ceremoniously by Countess Elgin. Different from previous exhibitions, all roads and walkways were made up to highway standards and all services were below ground. Above-ground construction started in July 1937 when King George VI and Queen Elizabeth unveiled the granite Commemoration Stone on the hill, where it remains today. The total area of buildings was well over I million square feet. Construction was of steel and timber, throughout clad in four-foot-square asbestos panels, the idea being drawn from Mendelsohn and Chermayeff's Bexhill Pavilion built in 1935, for which Tait had been the assessor. The permanent Palace of Art was built of brick. Construction at Bellahouston was completed in 10 months, making it a record for international exhibitions.

== Exhibits & Events ==
Sir Cecil Weir writes, "The British Commonwealth and the Colonies were as ably presented as the Mother Country herself. The lovely pavilions in Dominion and Colonial Avenues in Empire Court, separated by a beautiful ornamental lake and fountains with the great Engineering Hall at one end and the Industrial Halls at the other, flanked by innumerable pavilions erected by great industrial companies, newspapers, and public services grouped below the terrace approach to the Garden Club and the Tower gave the plan a grace and variety which took full advantage of the beauty of the natural features with which the site abounded.

On the other side of the Hill with its dominating Tower lay the Scottish pavilions, the Highland Village or Clachan,[2] the Palace of Arts, the Peace and Fitness Pavilions, and the Concert Hall, along with several smaller pavilions of a private character. Three fine new churches were well attended throughout the run of the Exhibition. The Commonwealth and its myriad resources and customs came to life in these exhibits. The Exhibition could be dubbed as much an exhibition of industrial achievement as of culture and the arts."

Nineteen restaurants and numerous milk and snack bars met the appetites of visitors from Britain and overseas, who, for transport around the vast site, had use of fifty Lister passenger autotrucks quietly traversing the roadways on a one-way route, linking pavilions and passing the well-used bandstands. Ten thousand people were carried each day. The Concert Hall – from which the BBC broadcast - staged classical concerts, jazz, dance bands, and variety billings arranged by Messrs Collins Variety Agency, and the Film Theatre presented newsreels, documentaries, and cartoons. At other times, its stage was used for drama, under the guidance of James Bridie, and for choral concerts.

There were frequent displays by the Army, Navy, and Air Force, pipe band competitions and massed band parades and open-air dancing. The Amusement Park, with its sub-franchise of the Big Ride (or Mountain Railway), was highly successful with its 28 large devices and 105 side-shows and games. An international football tournament was held throughout the summer for the Empire Exhibition Trophy, being won by Celtic, with Everton as runners up. The number of spectators totalled 340,000, a figure not added in to the main Exhibition attendances. The Electrical Association for Women demonstrated a working model ‘From Waterfall to Washer’, illustrating how electricity harnessed 'nature for the accomplishment of homely tasks’. A total of 87 national and international Congresses and Conferences were held, usually in the Concert Hall and its committee rooms, with smaller conferences held in the Castle Hall in the Clachan, and in the Fashion Theatre.

== Legacy buildings ==
The only major surviving original structure on the site is the Palace of Arts, designed by Launcelot H Ross, and now used for sporting and health activities. The Palace of Engineering was dismantled in 1940, transported to Scottish Aviation at Prestwick and re-erected, dramatically increasing the company's factory floor space. The building is still used by the aviation industry today and is a distinctive feature at Prestwick Airport. The former South Africa pavilion with its distinctive curvilinear Dutch Baroque gables also survives. Built as a temporary structure, the building was later moved to Ardeer in Ayrshire to become a staff canteen within ICI Ardeer. The Empire News Theatre, which showed films and newsreels, with a small stage for live performance, was re-erected in Lochgilphead in 1939 as a cinema. In 1991 it became a travel lodge. The highland Clachan was shipped to San Francisco. Billy Butlin bought the Concert Hall and some of the fountains. The city Information Bureau for the exhibition, and tourism, continued at Argyle Street/St Enoch Square, Glasgow for many decades.

Bellahouston Park, with its parklands and gardens, continues in popularity with its entrances from Paisley Road West, Dumbreck Road and Mosspark Boulevard. The Palace of Arts, Bellahouston Sports Centre, and the dry ski and snowboard slopes are established fitness and recreation centers. The acclaimed House for an Art Lover, built in the 1990s to the 1901 designs of Charles Rennie Mackintosh is a major attraction and function venue, adjoined to the flower gardens, sculpture park and art studios. Nearby on the park nurseries is the modern Prince & Princess of Wales Hospice, opened in 2018.

The Beresford Hotel opened in 1938 to provide accommodation for those attending the Empire Exhibition. It was often described as Glasgow's first skyscraper, being the tallest building erected in Glasgow between the two world wars, at 10 stories high. The building now consists of 112 private residences but remains one of the city's most notable examples of Art Deco/Streamline Moderne architecture. and is protected as a category B listed building.

== Digital resources about the exhibition ==
In December 2007, Digital Design Studio (now called the School of Innovation and Technology) at The Glasgow School of Art created a 3D graphic reconstruction of the 1938 exhibition, sourced from contemporary photographs, film footage, sketches and drawings from the archive of the Mitchell Library, amongst other sources. In 2010, this research centre was awarded a further research grant to enhance the 3D model for public engagement. The Glasgow School of Art's YouTube channel and website contains several videos of the 3D model. Further research funding in 2016 and 2024 enhanced this digital dataset with the creation of virtual immersive tools for learning, including a free interactive 3D model of the entire exhibition with guided tours and an augmented reality mobile app for use within Bellahouston Park. The most recent project included data gathered from contemporary Glaswegians and focusses on critical re-readings of this heritage

== See also ==
- International Exhibition of Science, Art and Industry (1888)
- Glasgow International Exhibition (1901)
- Scottish Exhibition of National History, Art and Industry (1911)
- Glasgow Garden Festival (1988)
