= Isaac Gracie =

British singer-songwriter (born 1994)

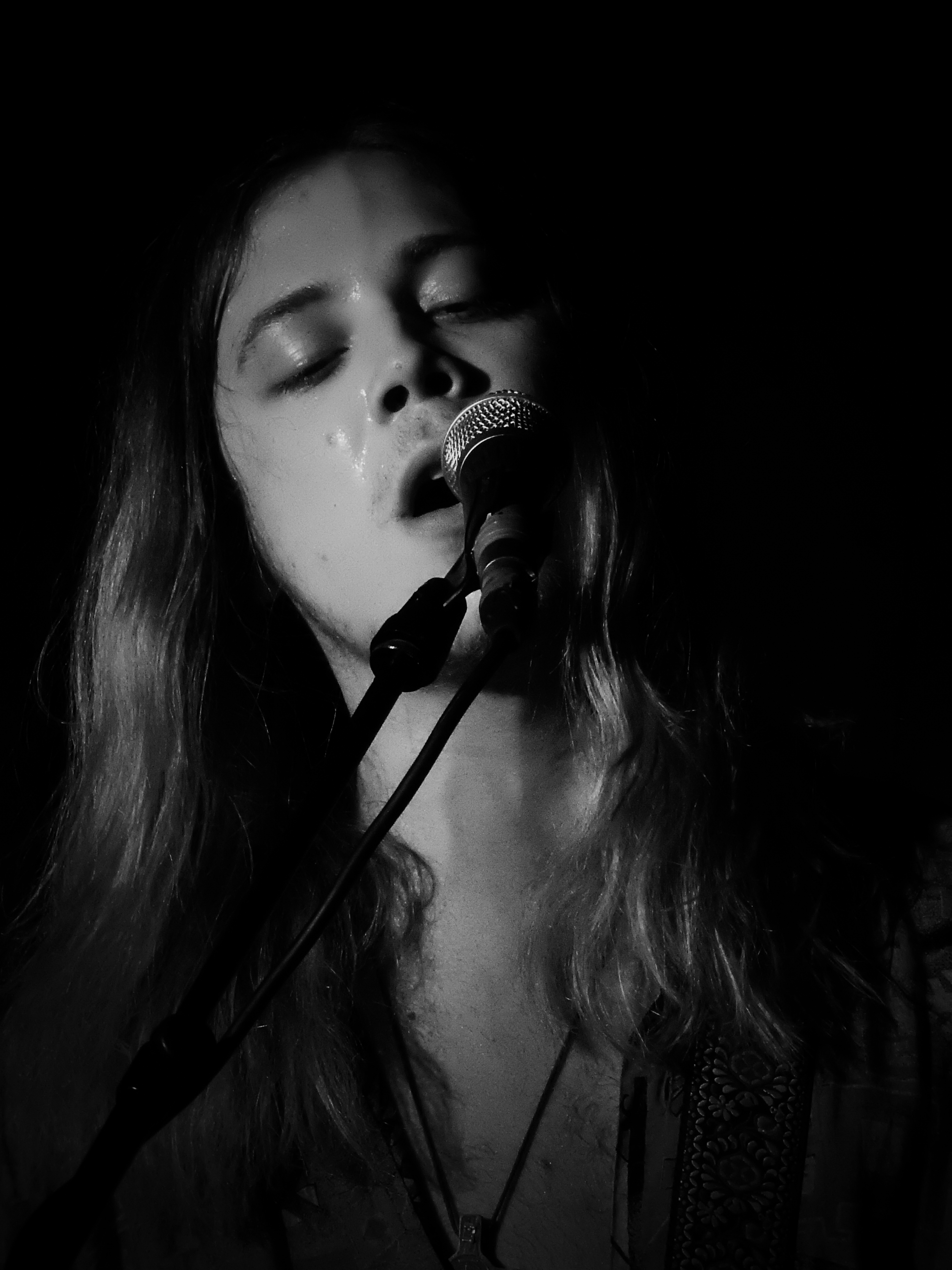
- Isaac Gracie performing live in 2017.

Background information
- Born: Isaac Joseph Gracie-Burrow; 28 October 1994 (age 32)
- Origin: Ealing, London, England
- Genres: Alternative rock, Indie rock, Folk rock
- Occupation: Singer-songwriter
- Instruments: Vocals, Guitar
- Years active: 2016–present
- Labels: Virgin EMI Records, Dew Process
- Website: www.isaacgraciemusic.com

Isaac Joseph Gracie-Burrow (born 28 October 1994), known professionally as simply Isaac Gracie, is a British singer-songwriter from Ealing, West London. As a child, Gracie sang in the Ealing Abbey Choir and started writing songs at the age of 14. Gracie signed a record deal with Virgin EMI Records in 2016 and released his self titled debut album in 2018.

== Discography ==
=== Studio albums ===
- Isaac Gracie (2018), peaked at No. 36 on the UK Albums Chart.

=== Live albums ===
- Songs in Black and White (2016)

=== Extended plays ===
- Songs From My Bedroom (2016)
- close up - looking down (2018)

=== Singles ===
- "The Death of You & I" (2017)
- "Terrified" (2017)
- "Last Words" (2018)
- "Running on Empty" (2018)
- "Show me Love" (2018)
- "The man who flew into space" (2023)

=== Videos ===
- Reverie (2017)
- All in my Mind (2017)
- The Death of You & I (2017)
- Silhouettes of You (2017)
- Terrified (2017)
- Last Words (2018)
- Running on Empty (2018)
- Show me Love (2018)
- The man who flew into space (2023)
