= Bellahouston Park =

Public park on the South Side of Glasgow

- Pàirc Bhaile Ùisdean
- Part of Bellahouston Park, with the Dumbreck Flats in the background
- Interactive map of Bellahouston Park
- Type: Public park
- Location: South Side of Glasgow, Scotland
- Coordinates: 55.84375°N 4.31732°W
- Area: 68.4 hectares (169 acres)
- Created: 1895
- Operator: Glasgow City Council
- Status: Open
- Public transit: Dumbreck railway station
- Website: Official Website

Bellahouston Park (/ˌbɛləˈhustən/ bel-a-HOOS-tən; Scottish Gaelic: Pàirc Bhaile Ùisdean) is a public park in the Bellahouston district on the South Side of Glasgow, Scotland, between the areas of Craigton, Dumbreck, Ibrox and Mosspark covering an area of 71 hectares (180 acres). The main part of Bellahouston Park was acquired by Glasgow Corporation in 1895 for the sum of £50,000, and opened to the public in 1896. Three years later, the city's second municipal golf course was established at Bellahouston, following the success of the course at Alexandra Park. The park was extended in 1901 by the addition of a part of Dumbreck Lands purchased for £2,824 from Sir John Stirling-Maxwell. A further addition was made in 1903, at a cost of £40,222, by including the lands of Ibroxhill, from which commanding views of the city are available.

In 1938 the Empire Exhibition was held at the park. The site took fourteen months to build. The price of admission was one shilling, and 12.5 million visits were recorded. The exhibition made a loss of £130,000. Of the 200 palaces and pavilions that were built for the exhibition, only the Palace of Art remains. It now serves as a Sports Excellence Centre. A stone Peace Cairn built for the exhibition is still visible from the rock garden.

In 1996 Charles Rennie Mackintosh's House for an Art Lover was completed from original drawings of 1901, and now serves as centre for the visual arts. It is based around Bella hill, created for the great Empire Exhibition. It has commanding views over most of the city, although views to the east are obscured by trees, and those to the south by hills in Mosspark. Views include that of Ballageich (Balagich) hill, rising to 1,084 feet (330 m) on the southern horizon in East Renfrewshire.

== History ==
Until the late 19th century, Bellahouston Park consisted of rural farmland as part of the Maxwell Estate, which included much of the surrounding area including Maxwell Park, Pollok Country Park, Pollok House and Haggs Castle, and also housed a riding school.

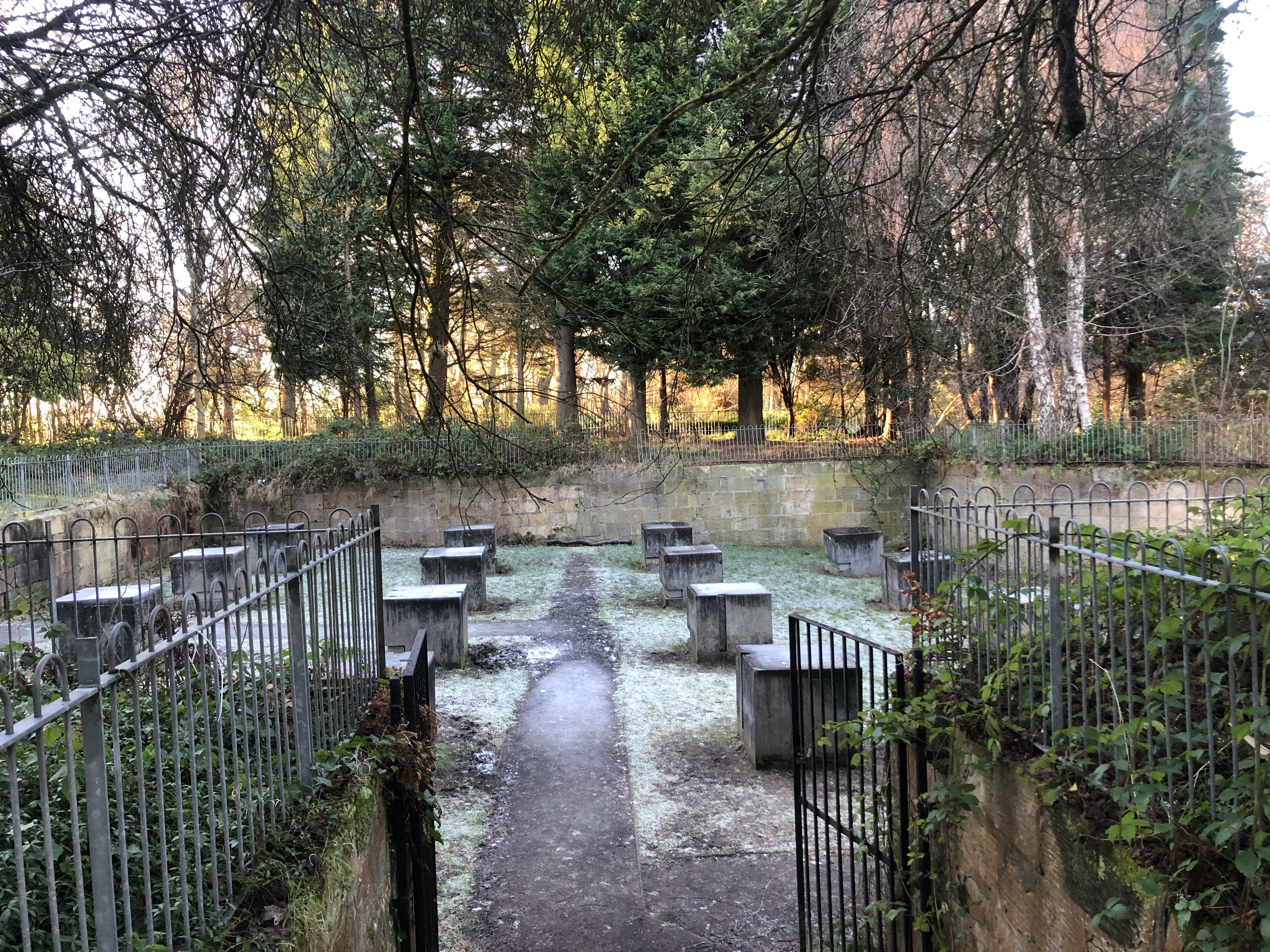
Foundation markers of Bellahouston House (formerly Dumbreck House) built in the early 1800s.

The land was purchased by Glasgow Corporation in 1895, and opened as a public park in 1896. Adjacent land was added to the park in 1901 and 1903. As Glasgow expanded, the park was eventually surrounded to the west, south, and east by housing, and to the north by the "White City" stadium, built in 1928, which hosted greyhound and speedway racing (located close to Rangers' stadium at Ibrox). The site is now that of the M8 motorway and the Headquarters of Strathclyde Police's G-Division.

The park has often been used as a location for major public events, including the Empire Exhibition of 1938, the 1978 IAAF World Cross Country Championships, the 1982 visit to Scotland by Pope John Paul II, and the September 2010 mass of Pope Benedict XVI. It has also been host to many Scottish Pipe Band competitions, a visit by Billy Graham the evangelist in the late 1980s, a Coldplay concert in 2005, and a Snow Patrol concert in 2010.

The Tait Tower was built on a hill in the park as part of the 1938 Empire Exhibition, but was demolished on the outbreak of World War II. A monument in the form of a large inscribed granite stone commemorating the 1938 Empire Exhibition currently overlooks Bellahouston Sports Centre and was unveiled by King George VI on 9 July 1937. Long-distance races, such as the Glasgow Marathon and Half Marathon, pass through the park, although events to the south were restricted in the 1990s when subsidence into old mine workings resulted in some depressions in the park surface.

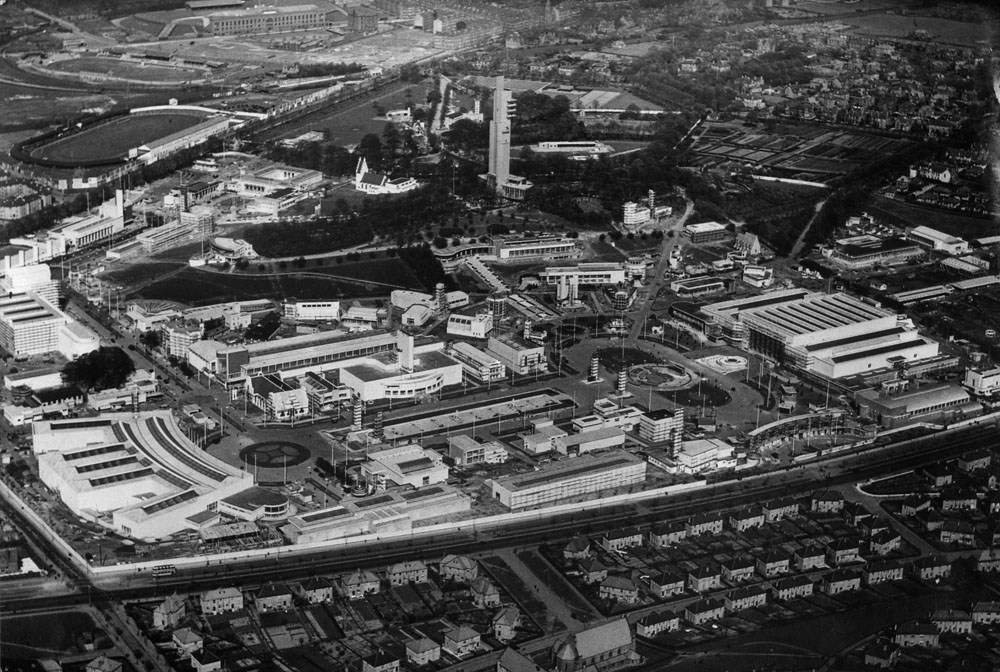
Bellahouston Park during Empire Exhibition of 1938

== Facilities ==
The park is home to Bellahouston Sports Centre and the Palace of Art Sports for Excellence Centre, the latter consisting of a building retained from the 1938 exhibition. The Glasgow Ski Centre houses an artificial ski slope, which was adapted in the early 1970s from the seating area around a former bandstand, and further extended in 2008. The bandstand has been retained as the clubhouse and equipment store. There are also a bowling club, all-weather hockey pitches, cycling facilities, an adventure playground, and an orienteering course. In March 2006, construction began on a cycling track adjacent to Bellahouston Drive. In the past there were many football pitches and three large changing rooms, which have since been removed. Since 2018 the park has also been the site of the Prince and Princess of Wales Hospice.

The park also houses a walled flower garden and the "House for an Art Lover", which was designed by Charles Rennie Mackintosh, and opened in 1996. An 11-tonne sculpture titled "Elephant for Glasgow", commissioned by House for an Art Lover from sculptor Kenny Hunter, is located near by. A section of the park is used as a plant nursery by Glasgow City Council.

The park is easily accessible via public transport, with Paisley Road West to the north and Mosspark Boulevard to the south. Although the Bellahouston Park Halt station was only open for the 1938 exhibition, Dumbreck station on the Paisley Canal Line is only 250m from the park. Ibrox is the closest subway station. Motorway access is good with the M8 passing the park, and the M77 first exit being near the former tram lines on Mosspark Boulevard which are used as car parks during exhibitions, and also house two small permanent car parks.

== Papal visits ==
The papal visit of John Paul II in June 1982, which attracted a congregation of approximately 250,000, was the largest recorded gathering in the history of the city. Despite this, the visit was the cause of some disquiet. The Roman Catholic Church had paid for the drainage of some parkland close to Mosspark Boulevard which was prone to flooding, in order to increase the number able to attend. Six trees were also removed to improve the view of a hill that housed the dais where the Pope was to celebrate Mass. Protesters chained themselves to the trees to prevent this.

There was another protest by Jack Glass, who stood in a local election for the "Pastor Jack Glass against the Papal visit" political party. The removed trees were replanted in the park three years after the Papal visit. A white brick painted wall that accommodated the rear of the dais has been maintained. On the death of John Paul II in April 2005, flowers were laid against the wall.

Pope Benedict XVI celebrated an open-air Mass in the park to celebrate the Feast of Saint Ninian on the evening of 16 September 2010, with a congregation of over 71,000 people, as part of his state visit to the United Kingdom.

== Events ==
=== Glasgow Summer Sessions ===
The Glasgow Summer Sessions which began in 2013 is an annual series of concerts held every August at Bellahouston Park. The concerts are typically held during the last weekend of August over 2-3 nights.

==== 2013 ====
| Thursday 15 August | Saturday 17 August | Tuesday 20 August |
| Kings of Leon; The Courteeners | Avicii; Tinie Tempah; Steve Aoki | Eminem; Kendrick Lamar; EarlWolf; Yelawolf; Chance the Rapper |

==== 2014 ====
| Saturday 16 August | Tuesday 19 August |
| David Guetta; Steve Angello; Oliver Heldens | The Killers; The Courteeners; Miles Kane |

==== 2015 ====
| Saturday 29 August | Sunday 30 August |
| Paolo Nutini; Grace Jones; The View; SOAK; Tuff Luv | Calvin Harris; Ellie Goulding; John Newman; Disciples; Burns |

==== 2016 ====
| Friday 26 August | Saturday 27 August |
| Noel Gallagher's High Flying Birds; Richard Ashcroft; Frightened Rabbit; Circa Waves | Biffy Clyro; Fall Out Boy; Wolf Alice; Cage The Elephant |

==== 2017 ====
Thursday 24 August
- Eminem
- Run The Jewels
- Danny Brown
- Russ (rapper)

==== 2018 ====
| Wednesday 22 August | Saturday 25 August | Wednesday 29 August |
| Kings of Leon; The Wombats; The Hunna; Everything Everything; Isaac Gracie | Catfish and the Bottlemen; Twin Atlantic; DMA's; Peace; Frank Carter & The Rattlesnakes; Neon Waltz | Kendrick Lamar; N.E.R.D; Bugzy Malone |

==== 2019 ====
| Friday 16 August | Saturday 17 August | Sunday 25 August |
| The Cure; Mogwai; The Twilight Sad; The Joy Formidable | Foo Fighters; Slaves; Frank Carter & The Rattlesnakes; The Van T's; Hot Milk | The 1975; Twin Atlantic; You Me at Six; Pale Waves; Ten Tonnes; No Rome |

=== Cancelled Green Day concert ===
In July 2017, a Green Day concert was cancelled due to health and safety issues, caused by adverse weather conditions, directly by the promoters (PCL). The show was officially cancelled just 40 minutes before the gates were due to open, scheduled for 14:00.

A statement was published on the Green Day website, saying: "Glasgow, we are very sad to report that our show today at Bellahouston Park has been cancelled. The local safety council, production crew, and concert organizers have deemed the stage unsafe for the fans and everyone involved. We are very distraught about this as we are in Glasgow now and were very much looking forward to this show as one of the highlights of our tour. We have been playing in extreme weather conditions throughout this European tour, and the last thing we want to do is see a show cancelled. We love our Scottish fans and we don't care if its raining fucking sideways, although the safety of our fans and our crew is always our top priority. We love you Scotland, we love the city of Glasgow and it goes without saying that WE WILL BE BACK!"
