= Bellahouston =

District of Glasgow, Scotland

Coordinates: 55.847584°N 4.304767°W

Bellahouston: Scottish Gaelic: Baile Ùisdean
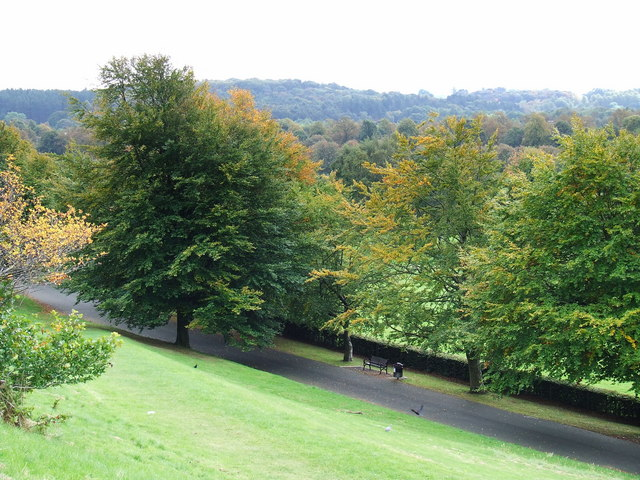
- Bellahouston Park, 2007

- Location within Glasgow
- OS grid reference: NS558640
- Council area: Glasgow City Council
- Lieutenancy area: Glasgow
- Country: Scotland
- Sovereign state: United Kingdom
- Post town: GLASGOW
- Postcode district: G51
- Dialling code: 0141
- Police: Scotland
- Fire: Scottish
- Ambulance: Scottish
- UK Parliament: Glasgow Central
- Scottish Parliament: Glasgow Southside

Bellahouston (/ˌbɛləˈhustən/ bel-a-HOOS-tən; Scottish Gaelic: Baile Ùisdean) is a district in the southwest of Glasgow. It is bordered by Dumbreck, Ibrox, Pollokshields, Craigton.

== History ==
Bellahouston Estate in the parish of Govan was purchased in 1726 by James Rowan of Marylands and his family resided there until 1824. Upon the death of Thomas Rowan in that year, the estate passed to a relative by marriage, one Moses Steven of Polmadie. During his lifetime he increased the size of the estate, buying land at Weariston and a house and land at Dumbreck. The whole became known as Bellahouston. Upon the death of Moses in 1871, the Estate passed to his sisters who, according to his wishes, established a trust which would dedicate the estate for 'charitable, religious and educational purposes' within greater Glasgow. The trust became operative when Elizabeth Steven died in 1892.

The Empire Exhibition, Scotland 1938 was held in Bellahouston Park and attracted over 13 million people.

The park has been the focal point of the visits by two popes to the city of Glasgow: On 1 June 1982 Pope John Paul II celebrated Mass attended by around 250,000 worshippers (reputedly the largest crowd ever assembled in Scotland). Twenty eight years later on 16 September 2010 Pope Benedict XVI celebrated Mass close to the same spot as his predecessor.

Bellahouston Park contains several sports facilities, including the Palace of Art, Sports for Excellence Centre, Bellahouston Sports Centre and the Glasgow Ski Centre (which is also home to Bellahouston Road Runners). The park also contains "House for an Art Lover" based on designs by architect, Charles Rennie Mackintosh, on which construction was completed in 1996. It was also the site of the futuristic Art Deco skyscraper, the Tait Tower, which was completed in 1938, but was subsequently demolished. Bellahouston is also home to the Bellahouston Sport Centre which has been renovated twice following two accidental fires. The latest revamp finished in 2001 means the centre now contains : Health Suite • Fitness Suite • Dance Studio • Main Pool • Leisure Pool • Flume • Outdoor Pool • Baby Pool • 2 x 5-court Sports Halls • Function Room • Gymnastics Centre • Crëche & Soft Play • Cafeteria • 2 Squash Courts. The swimming pools being the most notable new addition.

== Rail ==
- Corkerhill railway station or Dumbreck railway station on the Paisley Canal Line.
