= Sherbrooke Mosspark Church =

- Sherbrooke St Gilbert Church
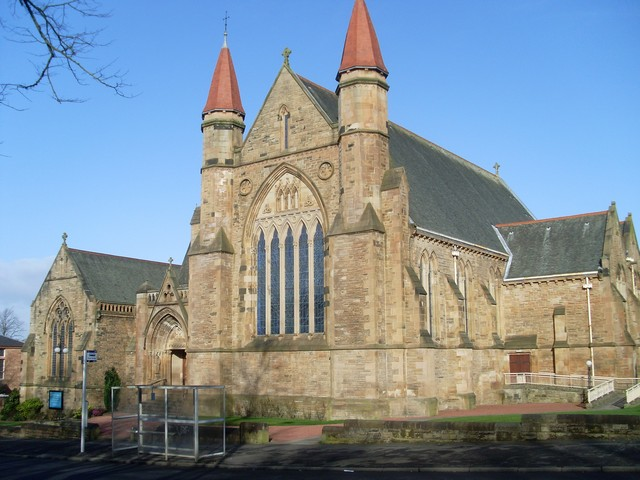
- Sherbrooke Mosspark Church
- 55°50′39″N 4°17′54″W
- Location: Glasgow
- Country: Scotland
- Denomination: Church of Scotland
- Previous denomination: United Free Church of Scotland
- Website: Church website

History
- Former name(s): Sherbrooke United Free Church (1900-1929); Sherbrooke Parish Church(1929-1940s); Sherbrooke St Gilbert's Church (1940s-2017)
- Status: Active

Architecture
- Functional status: Parish church
- Architect: William Forsyth McGibbon
- Architectural type: Church
- Style: Neo-Gothic
- Completed: 1900

Listed Building – Category B
- Designated: 15 December 1970
- Reference no.: LB33584

Sherbrooke Mosspark Parish Church, also known as Sherbrooke St Gilbert's Church, is a congregation of the Church of Scotland serving the Pollokshields, Dumbreck and Mosspark areas on the south side of Glasgow, Scotland. It is within the Church of Scotland's Presbytery of Glasgow.

== History ==
The church was designed by the architect William Forsyth McGibbon in a 13th-century Gothic style. The hall was completed in 1894 and the church itself in 1900, as Sherbrooke United Free Church, taking its name from the address on Sherbrooke Avenue, which in turn originated from the first family to make their home on the street, who had links to Sherbrooke, Nova Scotia in Canada. In 1929, the United Free Church of Scotland united with the Church of Scotland.

During World War II, the Sherbrooke congregation was joined by that of nearby St Gilbert's Parish Church (which had been part of the pre-1929 Church of Scotland); the St Gilbert's building, completed in 1911, remained unused for a few years before being transported brick-by-brick to a new location 5 miles (8.0 km) away at Burnside, South Lanarkshire, where it remains in use today as a prominent local feature.

Another merger occurred in late 2017 when Mosspark Parish Church, serving the neighbourhood to the west of Pollokshields, joined to create the current Sherbrooke Mosspark Parish Church. The Mosspark buildings on Ashkirk Drive, dating from 1927, were taken over and renovated by Harvest Glasgow.

== Building ==
The church building is located at 240 Nithsdale Road, close to Dumbreck railway station. It is a Category B Listed structure.

Whilst nearing the completion of a major refurbishment to celebrate the congregation's centenary, the church was destroyed by a serious fire in 1994. The burnt-out shell of the building was, however, able to be restored by the architect James Cuthbertson, with the work completed by 1998. A new 3 manual Lammermuir pipe organ was installed. The rebuilt sanctuary has notable, modern stained glass windows.

== Ministry ==
Past ministers include Very Rev George Johnstone Jeffrey from around 1928 to 1952 when he was elected Moderator of the General Assembly of the Church of Scotland.

The current minister (since 2003) is the Reverend Thomas L. Pollock.

== See also ==
- List of Church of Scotland parishes
