= Paisley Canal =

Paisley Canal may refer to:

- Paisley Canal line, a railway line in Paisley, Scotland
- Paisley Canal railway station, a station on the Paisley Canal Line
