= Bellahouston railway station =

Railway station serving the Bellahouston area of Glasgow, Scotland

Coordinates: 55.84662°N 4.29883°W

Bellahouston
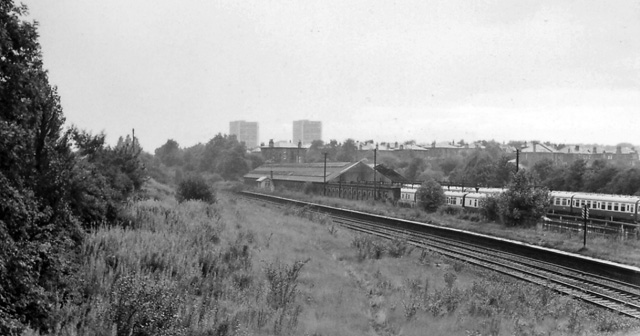
- Bellahouston station in 1974.

General information
- Location: Bellahouston, Glasgow; Scotland
- Platforms: 2

Other information
- Status: Disused

History
- Original company: Glasgow and South Western Railway
- Pre-grouping: Glasgow and South Western Railway
- Post-grouping: LMS

Key dates
- 1 July 1885: Opened
- 1 January 1917: Closed
- 1920s: Reopened
- 20 September 1954: Closed
Location

Bellahouston railway station was a railway station serving the Bellahouston area of Glasgow, Scotland. The station was originally part of the G&SWR Paisley Canal Branch.

== History ==
The station opened on 1 July 1885 and was closed to regular passenger traffic from 1 January 1917 although remaining open for workmen's traffic. It had fully reopened by mid-1920 and was closed to passengers by the British Transport Commission on 20 September 1954.

Today, part of the line is still operating as the Paisley Canal Line; and a new railway station, Dumbreck, was opened near to the site of Bellahouston station on 28 July 1990.

Preceding station	Historical railways	Following station
Corkerhill; Line and Station open	Glasgow and South Western Railway; Paisley Canal Branch	Shields; Line partially closed; Station closed
Corkerhill; Line and Station open	Glasgow and South Western Railway; Paisley Canal Branch	Shields Road; Line open; Station closed
Bellahouston Park Halt; Line open, station closed	London, Midland and Scottish Railway; Paisley Canal line	Glasgow Central; Line and station open

== Sources ==
- Butt, R. V. J. (October 1995). The Directory of Railway Stations: details every public and private passenger station, halt, platform and stopping place, past and present (1st ed.). Sparkford: Patrick Stephens Ltd. ISBN 978-1-85260-508-7. OCLC 60251199. OL 11956311M.
- Jowett, Alan (March 1989). Jowett's Railway Atlas of Great Britain and Ireland: From Pre-Grouping to the Present Day (1st ed.). Sparkford: Patrick Stephens Ltd. ISBN 978-1-85260-086-0. OCLC 22311137.
- Quick, Michael (2009) [2001]. Railway passenger stations in Great Britain: a chronology (4th ed.). Oxford: Railway & Canal Historical Society. ISBN 978-0-901461-57-5. OCLC 612226077.
