= Corkerhill =

Coordinates: 55.834443°N 4.334333°W

Corkerhill: Scottish Gaelic: Cnoc Chorcair; Scots: Coarkerhull
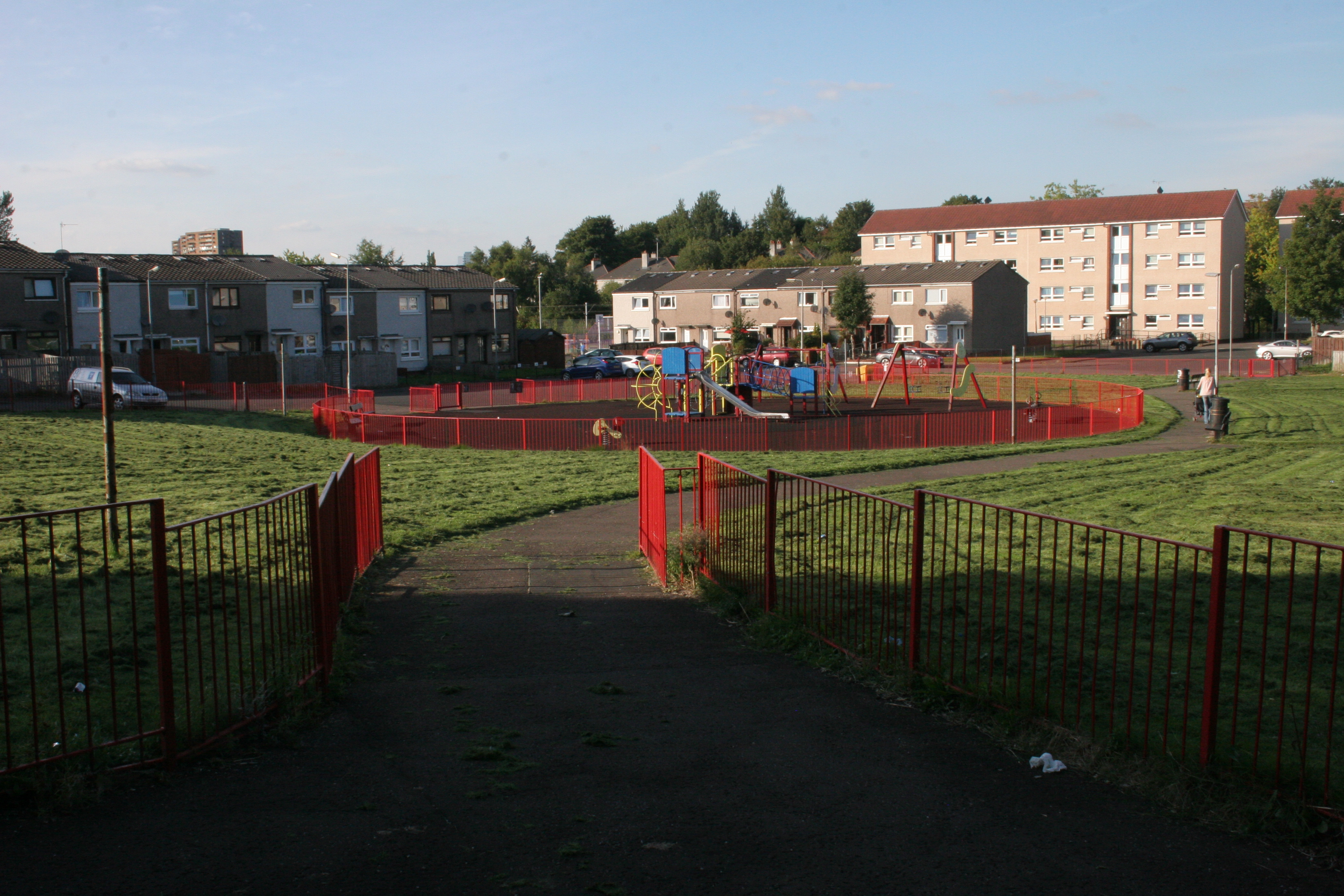

- Location within Glasgow
- Population: 800
- OS grid reference: NS539626
- Council area: Glasgow City Council
- Lieutenancy area: Glasgow
- Country: Scotland
- Sovereign state: United Kingdom
- Post town: GLASGOW
- Postcode district: G52 1
- Dialling code: 0141
- Police: Scotland
- Fire: Scottish
- Ambulance: Scottish
- UK Parliament: Glasgow South West
- Scottish Parliament: Glasgow Pollok; Glasgow

Corkerhill is a neighbourhood of Glasgow, Scotland, southwest of the city centre. The area was originally a farm and a few houses built for workers of the Glasgow and South Western Railway at the Corkerhill Depot. The engine sheds and sidings are still present, although Corkerhill signal box to the rear of the houses now facing Mosspark shops was demolished in the late 1970s.

Corkerhill railway station opened on 1 July 1885 as a staff halt for railway workers, and to the public in 1923. It is on the Paisley Canal Line.

In the 1920s, building in the area expanded as far as Mosspark and later Cardonald, making Corkerhill part of the Glasgow conurbation. In the 1950s, Glasgow Corporation built Hardridge Road, consisting of terraced and tenement dwellings.

Later in the 1960s, shops were built to address the shortage in the region, the nearest then being in Cardonald and Pollok. The Cart public house also opened, the only one in the area. Corkerhill spiralled into decline in the mid to late 1980s until many of the tenements were vandalised and empty and most of the shops were unrented. In 2004, demolition of the tenements began, being replaced with privately owned suburban style housing.

The area is bordered by the railway lines, the M77 motorway, Pollok Country Park and Nethercraigs Sports Complex, ten minutes from Glasgow Central on the train and close to two junctions of the motorway.

== Nethercraigs ==
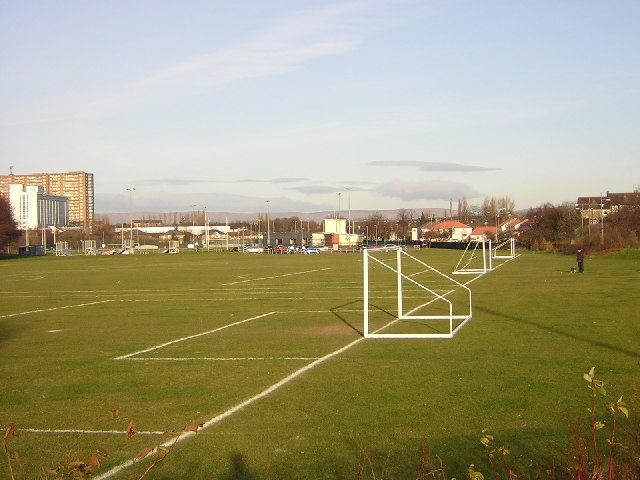
Nethercraigs in 2005, a short time after it opened

Nethercraigs lies adjacent to the Corkerhill residential area and is largely occupied by the Nethercraigs Sports Complex, which was formerly the home ground to Glasgow Gaelic football side, Tir Conaill Harps and was later used by the Glasgow Caledonian GAA as their home ground and training pitch.

The sports complex, built at a cost of £3.7 million with help from the Corkerhill community and the late local residents Walter Morrison and Elizabeth Campbell, was opened in 2005 by Alex Ferguson. It has a 3G astro pitch for 11-a-side football or three 7-a-side pitches, a separate 5-a-side pitch, two hockey pitches, gym, dance studio, running track, grass rugby pitch, three grass 11-a-side football pitches and a skate park. There are also areas for various athletic sports such as shot put and high jump. The 11-a-side, 5-a-side, hockey and rugby pitches are floodlit, as is the running track.
