= Bellahouston Park Halt railway station =

Short-lived railway station in Bellahouston, Glasgow

Bellahouston Park Halt

General information
- Location: Bellahouston, Glasgow; Scotland
- Coordinates: 55.8455°N 4.3183°W
- Grid reference: NS549638
- Platforms: 1

Other information
- Status: Disused

History
- Original company: LMS

Key dates
- 2 May 1938: Opened
- 1 January 1939: Closed
Location

Bellahouston Park Halt railway station served the district of Bellahouston, Glasgow, Scotland, from 1938 to 1939 on the Paisley Canal line.

== History ==
The station was opened on 2 May 1938 by the LMS. It served the 1938 Empire Exhibition in Bellahouston Park. When the exhibition closed in December 1938, the station closed shortly after on 1 January 1939.

Preceding station	Historical railways	Following station
Corkerhill; Line and station open	London, Midland and Scottish Railway; Paisley Canal line	Bellahouston; Line open, station closed
