= Mosspark railway station =

Railway station in Glasgow, Scotland

Mosspark Scottish Gaelic: Pàirc na Mòna
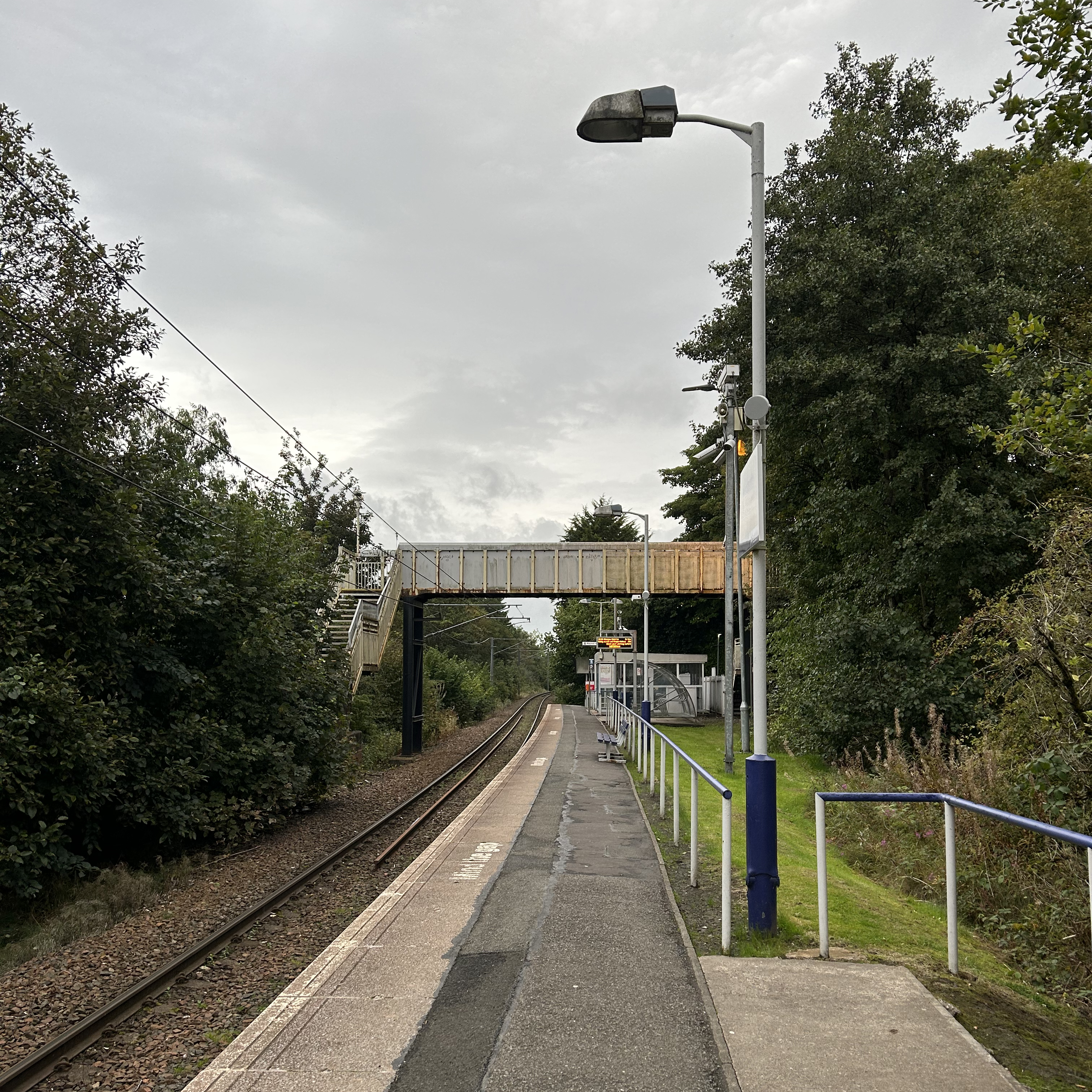
- Mosspark station, looking west (2023)

General information
- Location: Pollok and Cardonald, Glasgow; Scotland
- Coordinates: 55.8406°N 4.3471°W
- Grid reference: NS530633
- Managed by: ScotRail
- Transit authority: SPT
- Platforms: 1

Other information
- Station code: MPK

History
- Original company: LMS

Key dates
- 1 March 1934: Opened as Mosspark West
- 6 May 1974: Renamed Mosspark
- 10 January 1983: Closed
- 28 July 1990: Reopened

Passengers
- 2020/21: ▼35,796
- 2021/22: ▲88,846
- 2022/23: ▲0.107 million
- 2023/24: ▲0.141 million
- 2024/25: ▼0.130 million
Location
Notes
- Passenger statistics from the Office of Rail and Road

Mosspark railway station serves the Pollok and Cardonald areas of Glasgow, Scotland. The station is on the Paisley Canal Line, 3¾ miles (6 km) west of Glasgow Central and is managed by ScotRail.

The Mosspark district after which it is named is more closely served by Corkerhill railway station.

== History ==
The station was opened as Mosspark West by the LMS on 1 March 1934. There was however no Mosspark East. British Rail renamed the station Mosspark on 6 May 1974. On 10 January 1983, the station was closed to passengers, although the line was retained for freight services. The station reopened as part of the reinstatement of passenger services to Paisley Canal on 28 July 1990.

== Services ==
Currently the service pattern Mondays-Saturdays is:

- 2tph to Glasgow Central
- 2tph to Paisley Canal

There is one train per hour in each direction on Sundays.

Preceding station	National Rail	Following station
Crookston	ScotRail; Paisley Canal Line	Corkerhill
	Historical railways	
Crookston	London Midland and Scottish Railway; Paisley Canal Line	Corkerhill
