= Paisley West railway station =

Former railway station in Scotland

Paisley West
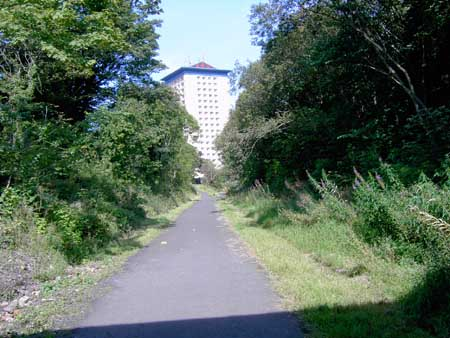
- The site of Paisley West station in 2007.

General information
- Location: Paisley, Renfrewshire; Scotland
- Coordinates: 55.8392°N 4.4410°W
- Platforms: 2

Other information
- Status: Disused

History
- Original company: Glasgow and South Western Railway
- Pre-grouping: Glasgow and South Western Railway

Key dates
- 1 June 1897: Opened
- 14 February 1966: Closed
Location

Paisley West railway station was a railway station in Paisley, Renfrewshire, Scotland. The station was originally part of the Paisley Canal Line.

== History ==
The station opened on 1 June 1897, and closed 14 February 1966.

Preceding station	Historical railways	Following station
Elderslie; Line and station closed	Glasgow and South Western Railway; Paisley Canal Line	Paisley Canal; Line closed; station open
Potterhill; Line and station closed	Glasgow and South Western Railway; Barrhead Branch	Paisley Canal; Line closed; station open
