= Mosspark =

Coordinates: 55.839951°N 4.328274°W

Mosspark: Scottish Gaelic: Pàirc na Mòna
- Location within Glasgow
- OS grid reference: NS543632
- Council area: Glasgow City Council
- Lieutenancy area: Glasgow
- Country: Scotland
- Sovereign state: United Kingdom
- Post town: GLASGOW
- Postcode district: G52
- Dialling code: 0141
- Police: Scotland
- Fire: Scottish
- Ambulance: Scottish
- UK Parliament: Glasgow South West
- Scottish Parliament: Glasgow Pollok

Mosspark (Scottish Gaelic: Pàirc na Mòna) is a district in the Scottish city of Glasgow. It is situated south of the River Clyde, in the southwest of the city.

== History ==
Mosspark and the lands of East and Mid-Henderston were incorporated into Glasgow in 1909. They covered seventy-two hectares of farmland and their acquisition was prompted by the need to develop peripheral communities to help ease the city's notorious overcrowding. The First World War was crucially important in determining Mosspark's pioneering place in Glasgow Corporation's housing programme. In 1919, groundbreaking legislation made it compulsory for local authorities to implement planned housing schemes, underpinned by subsidies. As a result, Mosspark became the most ambitious of the Corporation's immediate post-war developments.

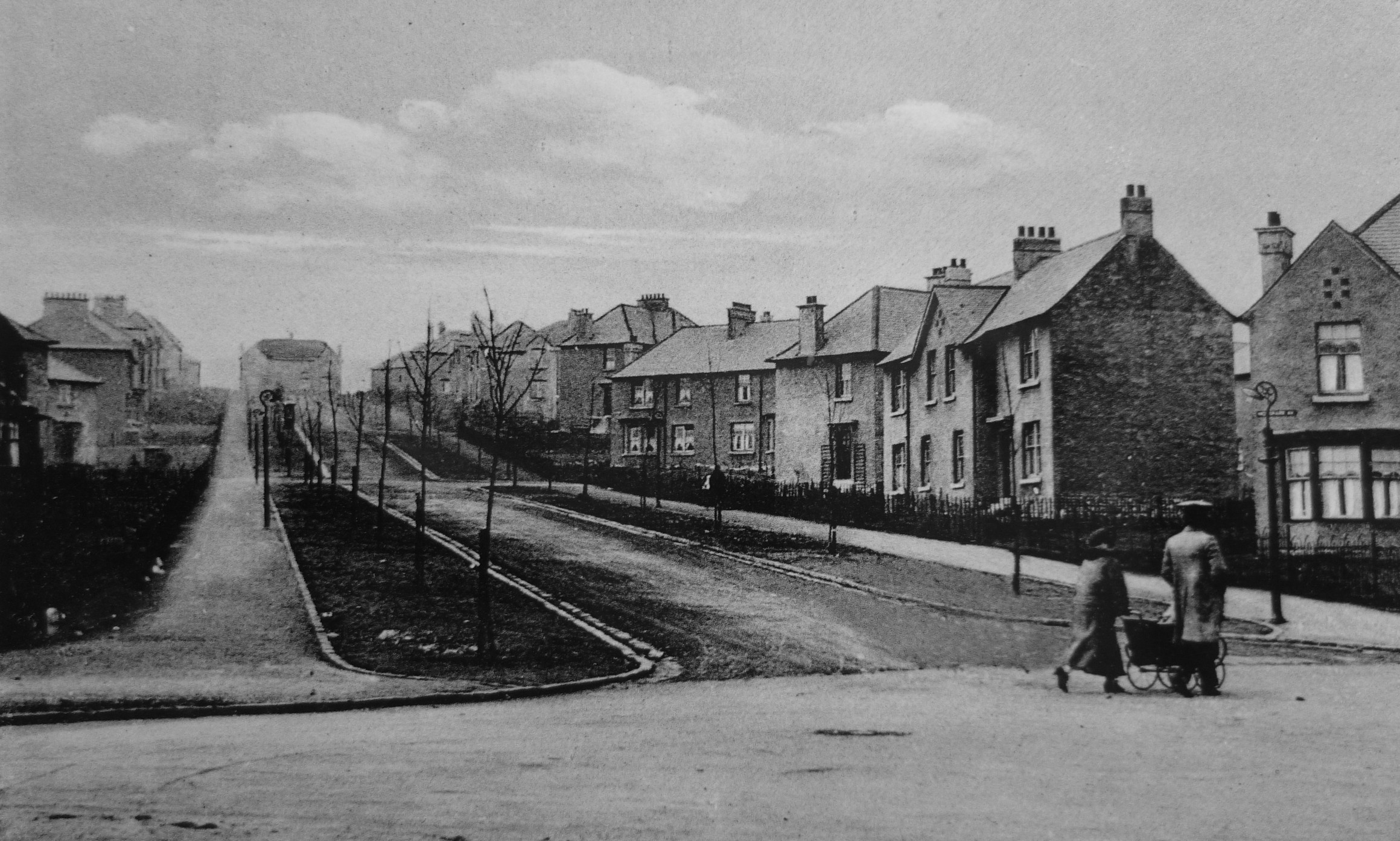
Postcard view of Mosspark Avenue

The housing density and extensive green space were inspired by Raymond Unwin and the Garden city movement. The neighbourhood is almost unique within the surrounding area with its tree-lined streets and boulevard stretching the length of the area at its most northern point. Entirely residential, the scheme's green and semi-rural setting was intended to provide a healthier alternative to the city's traditional tenement landscape, which had become too much identified with urban corrosion.

The 1500 house development was built by the firm Mactaggart and Mickel, with the local church also seen as an important consideration - its buildings on Ashkirk Drive were begun in 1927 and completed two years later. Although flats featured in Mosspark's plans, two-thirds of the housing stock was built in the form of cottages, semi-detached and terraced, and surrounded by gardens. The dwellings were built to high standards with spacious rooms and modern conveniences including a clean new energy source of electricity. The allocation of tenancies was predominantly to "professional" and "skilled" strata, and the area became and remained one of the most desirable for Corporation tenants.

The district's exclusive character had arisen because it was generally not cost-effective for the Corporation to build such prestigious, low-density developments, especially in the depressed economic climate of the inter-war years. Mosspark was consequently a showpiece of modern planning in Glasgow, but it could not serve as a realistic blueprint for the Corporation's long-term housing strategy. Similar later housing schemes were built like Knightswood, although the blueprint was changed to cheaper building materials, fireplaces were removed from the bedrooms and interior walls were no longer brick.

== Transport ==
To the North of Mosspark is Bellahouston Park and Paisley Canal railway line to the south, which separates the area from Corkerhill. Oddly, the nearest train station is Corkerhill while Mosspark railway station more accurately serves South Cardonald and northern Pollok.

== Facilities ==
The area has a great deal of amenities in spite of its rather small size, including a church, school, bowling club, several shops and a park directly facing the much grander Bellahouston Park. There are no public houses in Mosspark, the nearest being the Parkway Bar in Craigton.

In late 2017, the local parish church closed and the congregation merged into another in Pollokshields to form Sherbrooke Mosspark Church. The Category B Listed buildings were taken over and renovated by Harvest Glasgow.

== In popular culture ==
- Some outdoor portions of the sitcom Still Game were filmed in Mosspark.
- The TV show Vids used an empty shop in Mosspark as the storefront in the show.

== Notable people ==
- Barry Douglas Scottish professional footballer currently playing for St Johnstone attended Mosspark Primary School
- Peter Mullan, Scottish actor, film maker and former resident
- Robert J. Murray, Scottish songwriter
- John Fraser, actor
- Dean Keenan, former Scottish professional footballer who played for Greenock Morton, Ayr United and Troon; inducted into Troon Football Club Hall Of Fame
