= Glasgow, Paisley and Johnstone Canal =

Canal in Scotland

Coordinates: 55.848°N 4.252°W

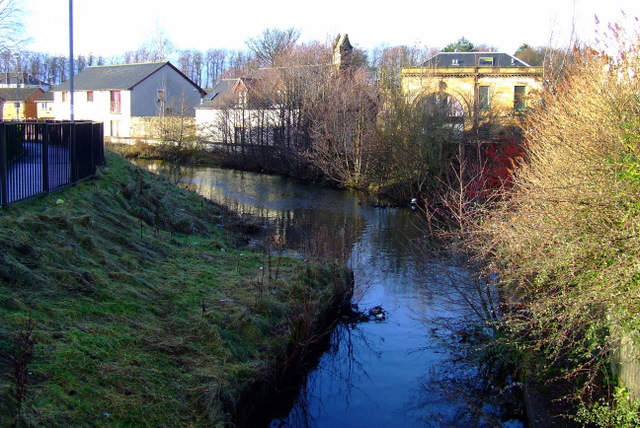
- Remains of the canal at Ferguslie Mill
- Interactive map of Glasgow, Paisley and Johnstone Canal

Specifications
- Status: converted to railway

History
- Original owner: Glasgow, Paisley and Ardrossan Canal Co
- Date of act: 1806
- Date completed: 1811
- Date closed: 1881

Geography
- Start point: Glasgow
- End point: Johnstone

The Glasgow, Paisley and Ardrossan Canal, later known as the Glasgow, Paisley and Johnstone Canal, was a canal in the west of Scotland, running between Glasgow, Paisley and Johnstone which later became a railway. Despite the name, the canal was never completed down to Ardrossan, the termini being Port Eglinton in Glasgow and Thorn Brae in Johnstone. Within months of opening, the canal was the scene of a major disaster.

== Construction ==
The canal was first proposed by Hugh Montgomerie, 12th Earl of Eglinton in 1791. He wanted to connect the booming industrial towns of Glasgow, Paisley and Johnstone to his new deep sea port at Ardrossan and his Ayrshire coal fields. His fellow shareholders included William Dixon of Govan who wished to export coal from his Govan colliery. The Earl had spent £100,000 on creating Ardrossan's harbour and intended to make it the principal port for Glasgow. Interest was also shown by Lord Montgomerie and William Houston who would also benefit from the canal passing through their lands and connecting their own coal and iron mines to nearby industrial consumers. In this pre McAdam period, the roads around Lanarkshire, Renfrewshire and Ayrshire were not suitable for heavily loaded traffic. The other alternative route, up the Clyde river estuary to Glasgow, was not navigable by large ships as the river was too shallow.

Engineers John Rennie, Thomas Telford and John Ainslie were employed to design the canal, survey a route, and estimate the costs. The original design was in three parts. The first section would be a contour canal of about 11 miles (18 km) in length. Following the land, a contour canal is entirely level and requires no locks or lifts making navigation quick and easy. Contour canals require only a small water supply since no water is lost to locks, but this method of construction would make the canal longer than it need have been. The second section would see a series of 8 locks lift the level up to a summit near Johnstone. The third and last section would use 13 locks to bring the canal down to sea level at Ardrossan Harbour. When complete the canal have been just shy of 33 miles (53 km) long. The dimensions of the cutting were to be 30 feet (9.1 m) broad at the top and at bottom, 18 feet (5.5 m). The depth was to be 4 feet 6 inches.

Glasgow, Paisley and Ardrossan Canal Act 1806
- Act of Parliament
- Parliament of the United Kingdom
- Long title: An Act for making and maintaining a navigable Canal from the Harbour of Ardrossan, in the County of Ayr, to Tradestown, near Glasgow, in the County of Lanark, and a collateral Cut from the said Canal to the Coalworks at Hurlet, in the County of Renfrew.
- Citation: 46 Geo. 3. c. lxxv

Dates
- Royal assent: 20 June 1806

Text of statute as originally enacted

The Company of the Proprietors of the Glasgow, Paisley and Ardrossan Canal was incorporated by an act of Parliament, the Glasgow, Paisley and Ardrossan Canal Act 1806 (46 Geo. 3. c. lxxv) which received royal assent on 20 June. This bill allowed for funding to be raised by the sale of two thousand eight hundred shares of £50 each, a total of £140,000, of which the proprietors, the Earl of Eglinton, Lord Montgomerie and Lady Jane Montgomerie subscribed £30,000.

Construction began in 1807 and the first boat, the passenger boat, The Countess of Eglinton, was launched on 31 October 1810. The passenger service initially only ran between Paisley and Johnstone. The full length to Glasgow's Port Eglinton was complete sometime in 1811. The original plans to extend the canal to Ardrossan were soon suspended. The costs of completing the first 11-mile (18 km) contour canal had consumed all the available funds – the initial estimates having been grossly understated. Further estimates indicated that £300,000 additional funding would need to be secured to complete the project. Hugh Montgomerie, 12th Earl of Eglinton, had already spent £100,000 on a separate project to build a sea harbour at Ardrossan, at the proposed terminus of the canal. The harbour project would eventually be competed by his grandson, the 13th Earl, for a total cost of £200,000. Attempts were made to raise extra funds but other major investors, such as William Houston, were reluctant to invest as the canal already linked his own coal and iron mines, around Johnstone, to Glasgow and Paisley.

== Operation ==
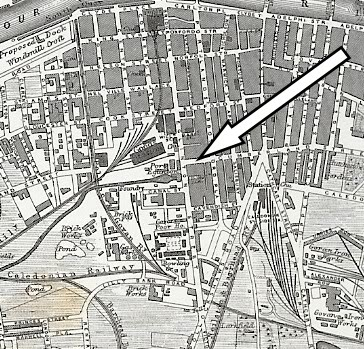
location of Port Eglinton

The canal ran from Port Eglinton; and an inn was built there in 1816. A wharf was built on the north bank of the White Cart near Crookston Castle; and canal basins provided at Paisley and Johnstone.

=== Passenger traffic ===
The canal became a popular service for passenger transport.

In 1830, long, and shallow wrought iron canal boats began to run regularly, conveying about sixty passengers a distance of 12 miles (19 km), at an average rate of 8 miles per hour (13 km/h), stoppages included. The boats reached speeds of 10 miles per hour (16 km/h), and although 14 journeys were made each day, no damage was caused to the canal banks by their wash.

This development was copied widely in the canal world, where they were known as swift boats or fly-boats, but it took the young John Scott Russell to explain the phenomenon and show its limits.

The Paisley canal passage boats were 70 feet (21 m) long and 6 feet (1.8 m) wide. With 90 passengers on board their draft was 19.25 inches (489 mm). The hull was constructed of light iron ribs and thin metal plates. The cabin was covered with oiled cloth. They covered the 7.75 miles (12.47 km) between Glasgow and Paisley in 50 minutes. They were towed by teams of two horses which were changed every 4 miles (6.4 km).

==== Deaths on the canal ====
A few months before the canal saw its first traffic, poet Robert Tannahill drowned himself during a bout of depression, by throwing himself into a deep pit which carries the water of a stream down to a culvert under the canal. This came to be known as Tannahills Hole. A group of his poems had just been rejected by an Edinburgh publisher. He was well known for periods of depression. He burned many of his writings at this time. His body was found on 17 May 1810 in the Candren Burn tunnel under the canal.

Shortly after the canal's opening, the Paisley canal disaster took the lives of 84 people, 52 males and 32 females. Saturday 10 November 1810 was the Martinmas Fair. Many people, with the day off work, took the opportunity to travel the short distance of 6 miles (9.7 km) by canal between Paisley and Johnstone. As The Countess of Eglinton docked at the Paisley wharf, there was a rush of people trying to get onto the boat. At the same time, people from Johnstone were attempting to disembark. Despite the attempts of the boat men to push off again, the weight of people pushing onto the boat caused it to suddenly overturn, throwing many passengers into the cold water of the wharf.

Even though the wharf was only 6 feet (1.8 m) deep, the coldness of the water and the sheer sides of the embankments compounded the problem that few people of the time could swim. 85 people died in this disaster.

=== Freight traffic ===
Freight also made a significant part of the traffic on the canal. Basin dues were set at 2 pence per ton. Stone, dung and earth were charged at 2 pence per mile per ton; coal, coke culm and lime were 3 pence per mile per ton; Bricks, tiles, slates, ores, iron and metal were rated at 5 pence per mile per ton; and all other goods were charged 2 pence per mile per ton. In 1840, the canal handled 76,000 long tons (77,000 t) of goods.

=== Profitability ===
The construction costs were so high that the canal never made an issue of dividend on its shares. Even after 20 years of operations, the accounts showed an outstanding debt of £71,208, 17 shillings and 6 pence.

=== Canal versus railway ===
In 1827, a second bill passed Parliament and gained royal assent on 14 June as the Glasgow, Paisley and Ardrossan Canal and Railway Act 1827 (7 & 8 Geo. 4. c. lxxxvii). This act allowed for the financing and construction of a railway from the Johnstone canal basin to Ardrossan. This railway was to have been 22 miles (35 km) and 3 furlongs long. Parliament dictated that due to the failure to complete the canal past Johnstone, that work on the railway should be started at the Ardrossan harbour end. The line did not progress past Kilwinning before running out of funds. The railway, owned and operated by the canal company, was built to the Scotch gauge of 4 feet 6 inches (1,370 mm). It used pairs of horses to pull carriages of up to 22 people each. The fares were initially 1 penny per mile but in 1837, due to the application of a government duty, the fare was raised to 8 pence per 6 miles (9.7 km). In the three years preceding September 1839, the railway transported an average of 30,000 people each year. Apart from passengers, the main freight was coal from Eglinton's mines.

The dredging of the River Clyde and other navigation improvements, allowing ships to sail directly to the centre of Glasgow, meant Eglinton's dream that, "Ardrossan would be to Glasgow what Liverpool is to Manchester." would not be fulfilled.

A second railway line was opened, in 1840, by the Glasgow, Paisley, Kilmarnock and Ayr Railway Company (GPK&A), in direct competition with the canal. This new railway linked with the Ardrossan Railway near Kilwinning and later purchased the Ardrossan Railway, the railway company's debts and the harbours. The canal continued to compete with the railways for many decades, but by the Glasgow and South Western Railway (Paisley Canal, &c.) Act 1869 (32 & 33 Vict. c. xlviii) it was purchased by the Glasgow and South Western Railway Company (the successor to GPK&A). In 1881, the Glasgow and South Western Railway Act 1881 (44 & 45 Vict. c. cxlix) closed the canal. Much of the route was used to construct the Paisley Canal railway line.

== Conversion to a railway ==
=== The Ardrossan Railway ===
In the 1820s the canal company planned to build a railway between Johnstone and Ardrossan to finish the link. They raised further capital and started building the railway from Ardrossan; reaching Kilwinning before running out of money. In the 1830s they planned to turn their canal into a railway and complete the link from Kilwinning to Johnstone; but allowed the scheme to fold. In the 1840s they split off their railway, by the Ardrossan and Johnston Railway Act 1840 (3 & 4 Vict. c. civ) to form a separate company, the Ardrossan Railway, and transferred their debt to the new company.

=== Closure of the canal ===
The canal was purchased in 1869 by the Glasgow and South Western Railway Company. In 1881, the Glasgow and South-Western Railway Act 1881 (44 & 45 Vict. c. cxlix) closed the canal. Much of the route was used to construct the Paisley Canal Line. This line still uses the River Cart Aqueduct (which it crosses at a skewed angle). This makes the former aqueduct the world's oldest railway bridge that is still in active use.

=== Closure and partial reopening of the Paisley Canal Line ===
The Paisley Canal railway line closed to passengers in 1983. The rails between Elderslie and the original Paisley Canal Station were uplifted in 1986; and the station became a steakhouse. In 1990, passenger services resumed on the section from Glasgow Central station to a new Paisley Canal station. Much of the abandoned track bed beyond Paisley has now been developed into a cycle and walkway operated by Sustrans.

Short sections of the original canal can still be seen at the Millarston and Ferguslie Mills area of Paisley. Houses in Tenters Way and Cromptons Grove face across the remnants. Traces of the old canal are also visible in fields between Hawkhead and Rosshall.

== See also ==
- Canals of Great Britain
- History of the British canal system
- Laigh Milton Viaduct Scotland's old railway bridge.
