= River Cart Aqueduct =

Bridge in Renfrewshrie, Scotland

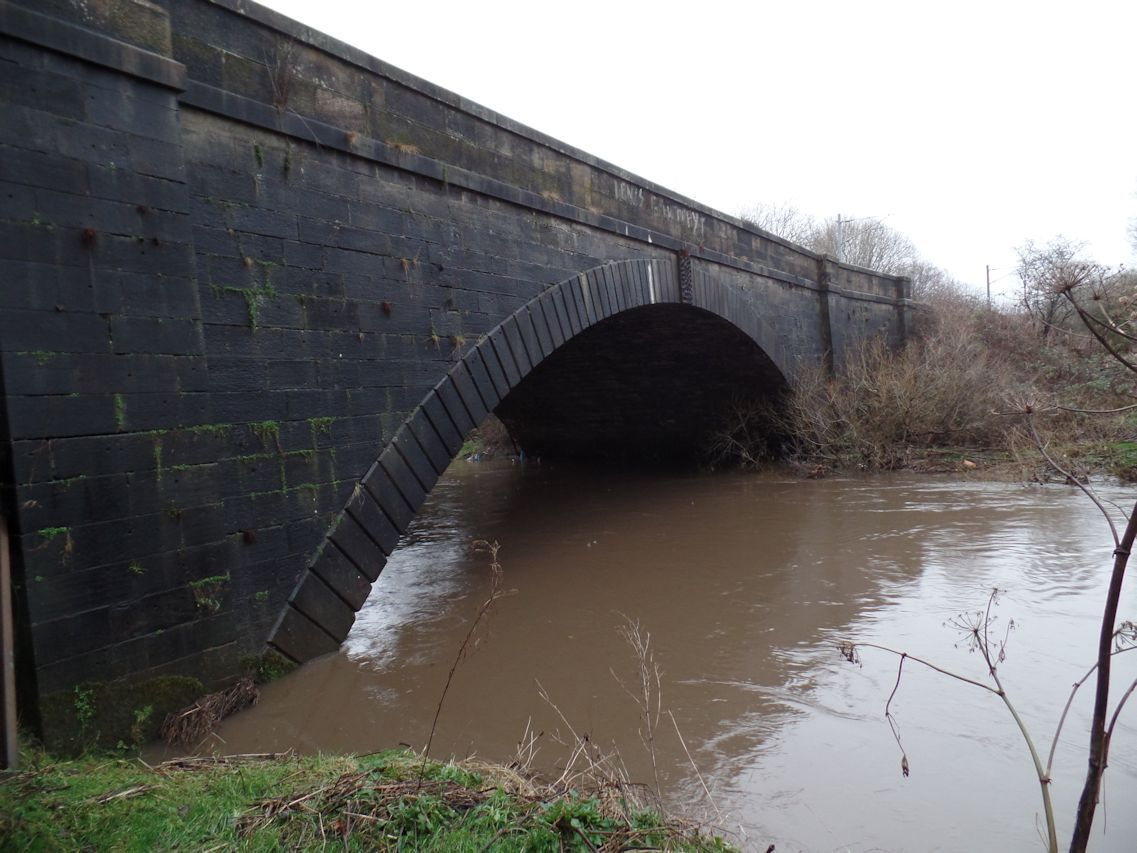
- Coordinates: 55.839986°N 4.406396°W
- Carries: Paisley Canal Line
- Crosses: River Cart

Characteristics
- Material: Stone
- Height: 30 feet (9.1 m)

History
- Designer: John Rennie and Thomas Telford
- Opened: 1811 (opened in 1885 as railway bridge)

Listed Building – Category A
- Official name: Blackhall Railway Viaduct Over White Cart Water
- Designated: 27 March 1985
- Reference no.: LB38923

Location
- Interactive map of River Cart Aqueduct

The River Cart Aqueduct, sometimes known as the Blackhall Bridge, is a railway bridge and former navigable aqueduct in Paisley, Renfrewshire, Scotland. It opened in 1811 as an aqueduct to carry the Glasgow, Paisley and Johnstone Canal over the White Cart Water. Following the closure of the canal in 1881, it was converted to a railway bridge in 1885, and now carries the Paisley Canal Line. It is registered as a Category A listed building by Historic Environment Scotland.

== History ==
The aqueduct was built between 1808 and 1810, and opened in 1811 to carry the Glasgow, Paisley and Johnstone Canal. John Rennie and Thomas Telford were involved in the engineering process. The contractor was John Simpson and the cost of construction was £5,440.

The canal was closed in 1881, and converted to run the Paisley Canal Line, which opened in 1885.

== Design ==
It is a freestone masonry segmental arch of 88 feet 6 inches (27 m) span and a height over the water of about 30 feet (9 m). The bridge is probably the longest span masonry aqueduct of the canal age on a British canal, and one of the world's earliest bridges carrying a public railway. It was widened to carry the double track railway, and the line crosses the bridge at a slight skew because of the easing of the sharp canal curvature.

When the aqueduct carried the canal, it was only the width of a single boat, making it necessary to wait for another boat to pass at times.

== See also ==
- List of canal aqueducts in the United Kingdom
- List of Category A listed buildings in Renfrewshire
- List of listed buildings in Paisley, Renfrewshire
- List of railway bridges and viaducts in the United Kingdom
