= Archie Meiklem =

Scottish footballer

Personal information
- Full name: Archibald Cameron Meiklem
- Date of birth: 24 August 1889
- Place of birth: Dumbreck, Scotland
- Date of death: 1963 (aged 73–74)
- Place of death: Govan, Scotland
- Position: Outside right

Senior career*
Years	Team	Apps	(Gls)
1915	Queen's Park	3	(0)
- * Club domestic league appearances and goals

Archibald Cameron Meiklem (24 August 1889 – 1963) was a Scottish amateur footballer who played as an outside right in the Scottish League for Queen's Park.

== Career statistics ==
Appearances and goals by club, season and competition
Club	Season	League			Other		Total	
Club	Season	Division	Apps	Goals	Apps	Goals	Apps	Goals
Queen's Park	1914–15	Scottish First Division	3	0	0	0	3	0
Career total			3	0	0	0	3	0
