= Hawkhead railway station =

Railway station in Renfrewshire, Scotland

Hawkhead
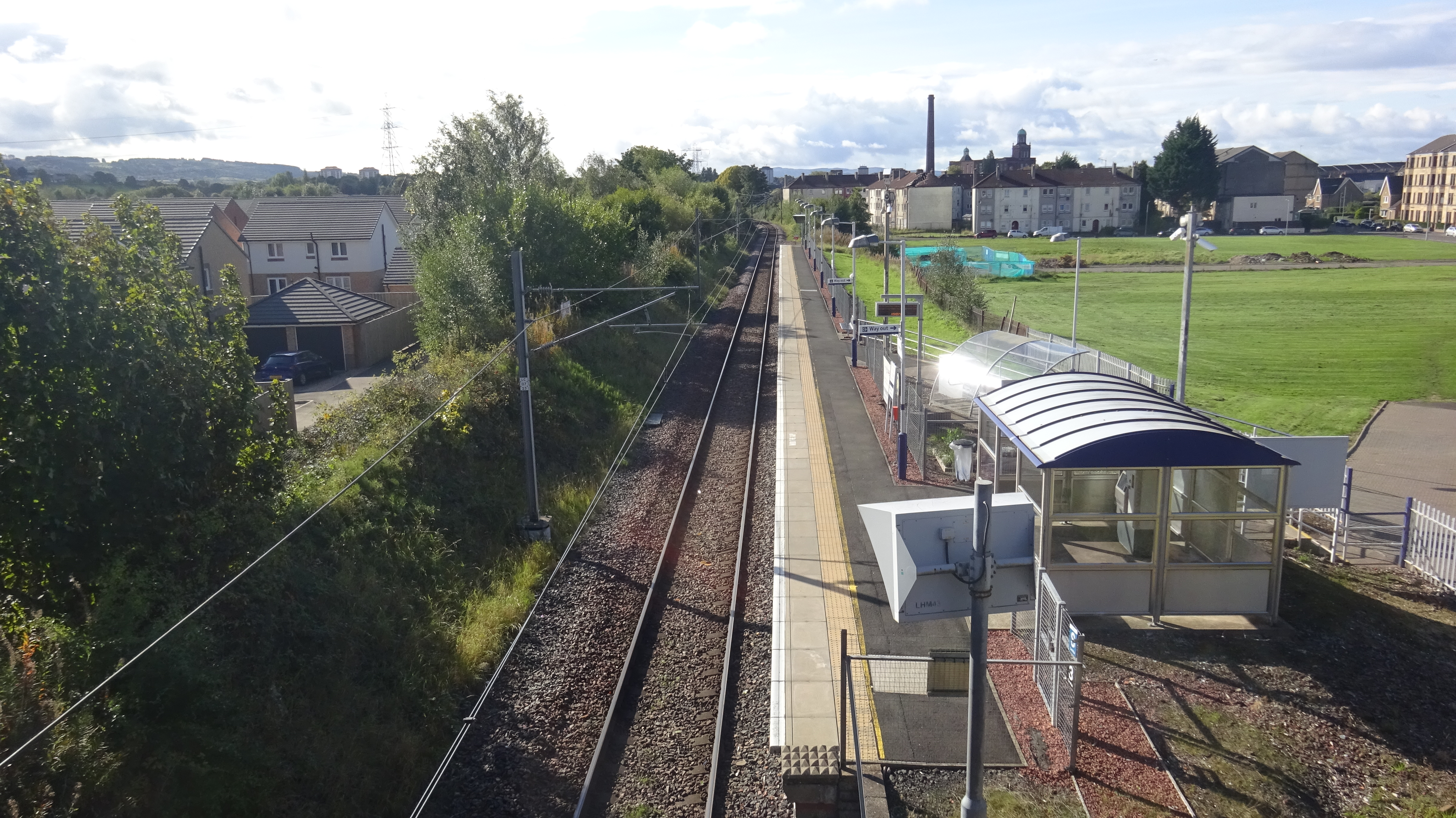
- Hawkhead station in 2023, looking west towards Paisley Canal

General information
- Location: Paisley, Renfrewshire; Scotland
- Coordinates: 55.8421°N 4.3995°W
- Grid reference: NS498635
- Managed by: ScotRail
- Transit authority: SPT
- Platforms: 1

Other information
- Station code: HKH

History
- Original company: Glasgow and South Western Railway
- Pre-grouping: Glasgow and South Western Railway
- Post-grouping: LMS

Key dates
- 1 May 1894: Opened
- 1 January 1917: Closed
- 1919: Reopened
- 14 February 1966: Closed
- 12 April 1991: New station, reopened by British Rail

Passengers
- 2020/21: ▼33,808
- 2021/22: ▲0.115 million
- 2022/23: ▲0.167 million
- 2023/24: ▲0.218 million
- 2024/25: ▼0.217 million
Location
Notes
- Passenger statistics from the Office of Rail and Road

Hawkhead railway station is a railway station in the Seedhill area of Paisley, Renfrewshire, Scotland. The station is managed by ScotRail and lies on the Paisley Canal Line, 6½ miles (10 km) west of Glasgow Central.

== History ==
The station opened on 1 May 1894 and was closed on 1 January 1917. It was reopened in 1919 and was closed to passengers on 14 February 1966.

A newly built station opened on 12 April 1991 following the resumption of train services on the Paisley Canal Line, in 1990 by British Rail.

== Services ==
Monday to Saturdays there is a half-hourly service westbound to Paisley Canal and eastbound to Glasgow Central.

On Sundays, an hourly service operates to both Paisley Canal and Glasgow Central,

Preceding station	National Rail	Following station
Paisley Canal	ScotRail; Paisley Canal Line	Crookston
	Historical railways	
Paisley Canal	Glasgow and South Western Railway; Paisley Canal Line	Crookston
