= George Johnstone Jeffrey =

Scottish minister

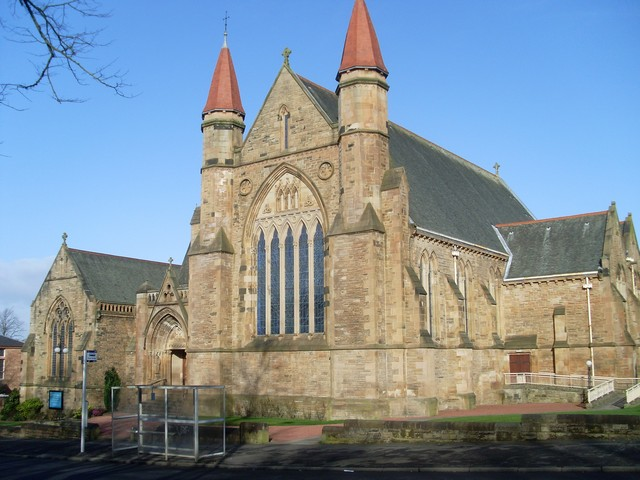
Sherbrooke St Gilbert's Church, Glasgow

George Johnstone Jeffrey was a Scottish minister who served as Moderator of the General Assembly of the Church of Scotland from May 1952 until May 1953.

== Life ==
From 1920 to 1928 he was minister of the New Laigh Kirk (West High Kirk) in Kilmarnock.

In 1938 he was minister of Sherbrooke St Gilbert's Church, in Pollokshields in Glasgow. He was still minister of Sherbrooke when he served as Moderator. During his year as Moderator, he opened up the rebuilt the Scots International Church in Rotterdam, after it had been destroyed in a bombing raid in 1940, during World War 2.

He retired from Sherbrooke the year he succeeded William White Anderson as Moderator. He was replaced at Sherbrooke by David Noel Fisher (1914–2009).

== Family ==
He was married with at least one child: Archibald Jeffrey.
