= Paisley canal disaster =

1810 maritime incident in Scotland

Coordinates: 55.84094°N 4.42815°W

The Paisley Canal Disaster occurred on 10 November 1810 on the Glasgow, Paisley and Johnstone Canal, a canal linking Glasgow to Paisley and Johnstone in Renfrewshire, Scotland.

== Family pleasure trip ==
The 59.5-foot (18.1 m) canal boat Countess of Eglinton designed for holiday day trips between the two towns operated from a dock belonging to a Mr. Barclay in Paisley. The charter had been in operation for approximately a week and had proven enormously popular with local people, who took their families on the journey on their day off from work as a pleasure cruise. The cost of a trip was just 8 pence, and with the day in question experiencing some unseasonable good weather, a lot of people were hoping to take a ride.

== Disaster ==
At 1pm on 10 November, the Countess of Eglinton had returned to Barclay's dock, where a large crowd had gathered, hoping to join the cruise. As the previous load of passengers disembarked, the crowd waiting on the dock became anxious and began to push forward. This agitation increased rapidly, until those at the rear of the crowd surged forwards in an attempt to secure a place on the boat. Dozens of people fell into the canal, where a number drowned as they were unable to swim.

On the Countess of Eglinton herself, the number of people surging onto the craft at one end combined with the panicked previous passengers attempting to scramble off at the other caused the boat to capsize, trapping over 60 people in the narrow passage along the inside of the boat.

Desperate attempts were made to rescue those in the water, and three people were pulled from the interior of the boat, but the majority of those inside the craft were unable to be rescued. When the barge was righted a week later, the final death toll was established at 84 people, of whom 66 were under 20 years old and 18 under 10. The Times carried articles on the disaster on 16 and 19 November.

The exact location of the disaster was at the northern end of the Canal Basin, inside the storehouse built there. Using an OS map for Paisley circa 1865, the bow of the Countess of Eglinton was at coordinates 55.84105, -4.42819, and the stern at 55.84089, -4.42812 during the disaster.

== Commemorative Plaques ==
Two plaques can be found nearby commemorating what turned out to be the worst disaster of the Canal Age. One, donated by J & W Goudie and unveiled by Provost Celia Lawson in 2011, is mounted on a low granite plinth in the grounds of Paisley Abbey while another more recent one, donated by City Gate Construction and unveiled by Provost Lorraine Cameron, has been mounted on a wall adjacent to Paisley Canal station.

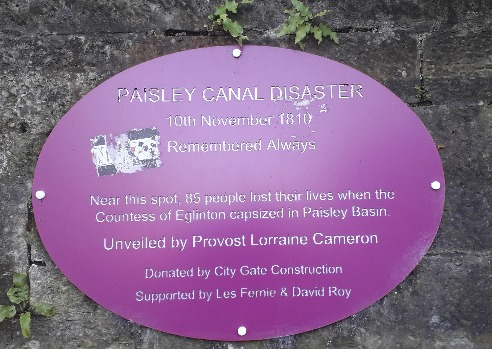

.

== See also ==
- Canals of the United Kingdom
- History of the British canal system
