= Crookston railway station =

Railway station in Glasgow, Scotland

Crookston
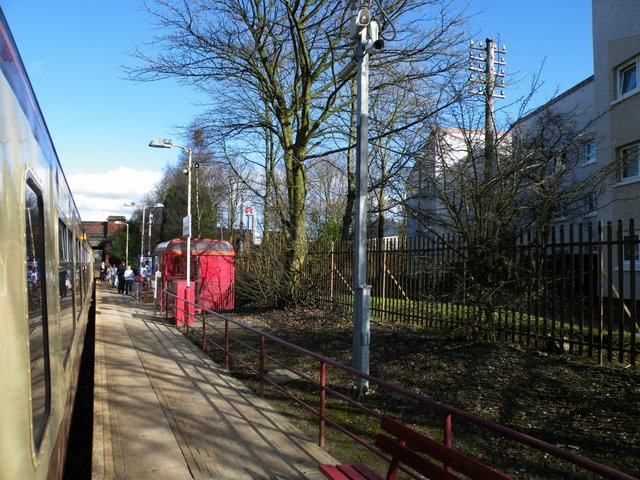
- Crookston station in 2009.

General information
- Location: Crookston, Glasgow; Scotland
- Coordinates: 55.8422°N 4.3653°W
- Grid reference: NS520635
- Managed by: ScotRail
- Transit authority: SPT
- Platforms: 1

Other information
- Station code: CKT

History
- Original company: Glasgow and South Western Railway
- Pre-grouping: Glasgow and South Western Railway
- Post-grouping: London Midland and Scottish Railway

Key dates
- 1 July 1885: Opened
- 1 January 1917: Closed
- 1919: Reopened
- 10 January 1983: Closed
- 28 July 1990: Reopened

Passengers
- 2020/21: ▼36,860
- 2021/22: ▲0.113 million
- 2022/23: ▲0.149 million
- 2023/24: ▲0.192 million
- 2024/25: ▼0.184 million
Location
Notes
- Passenger statistics from the Office of Rail and Road

Crookston railway station is a railway station in Crookston, a district of Glasgow, Scotland. The station is managed by ScotRail and lies on the Paisley Canal Line which was reopened by British Rail, 4 1/2 miles (7 km) west of Glasgow Central.

== History ==
The station was opened by the Glasgow and South Western Railway on 1 July 1885. It was temporarily closed due to the First World War on 1 January 1917 reopening in 1919. Following review of the finances of operations of railway services operated by Strathclyde Passenger Transport Executive, funding for the line was withdrawn resulting in the closure of the station on 10 January 1983. The station reopened on 28 July 1990 at the same time as the Paisley Canal Line reopened by British Rail. The station buildings are now protected as a category B listed building.

== Services ==
Monday to Saturdays there is a half-hourly service eastbound to Glasgow Central and westbound to Paisley Canal.

On Sundays, an hourly service operates in each direction.

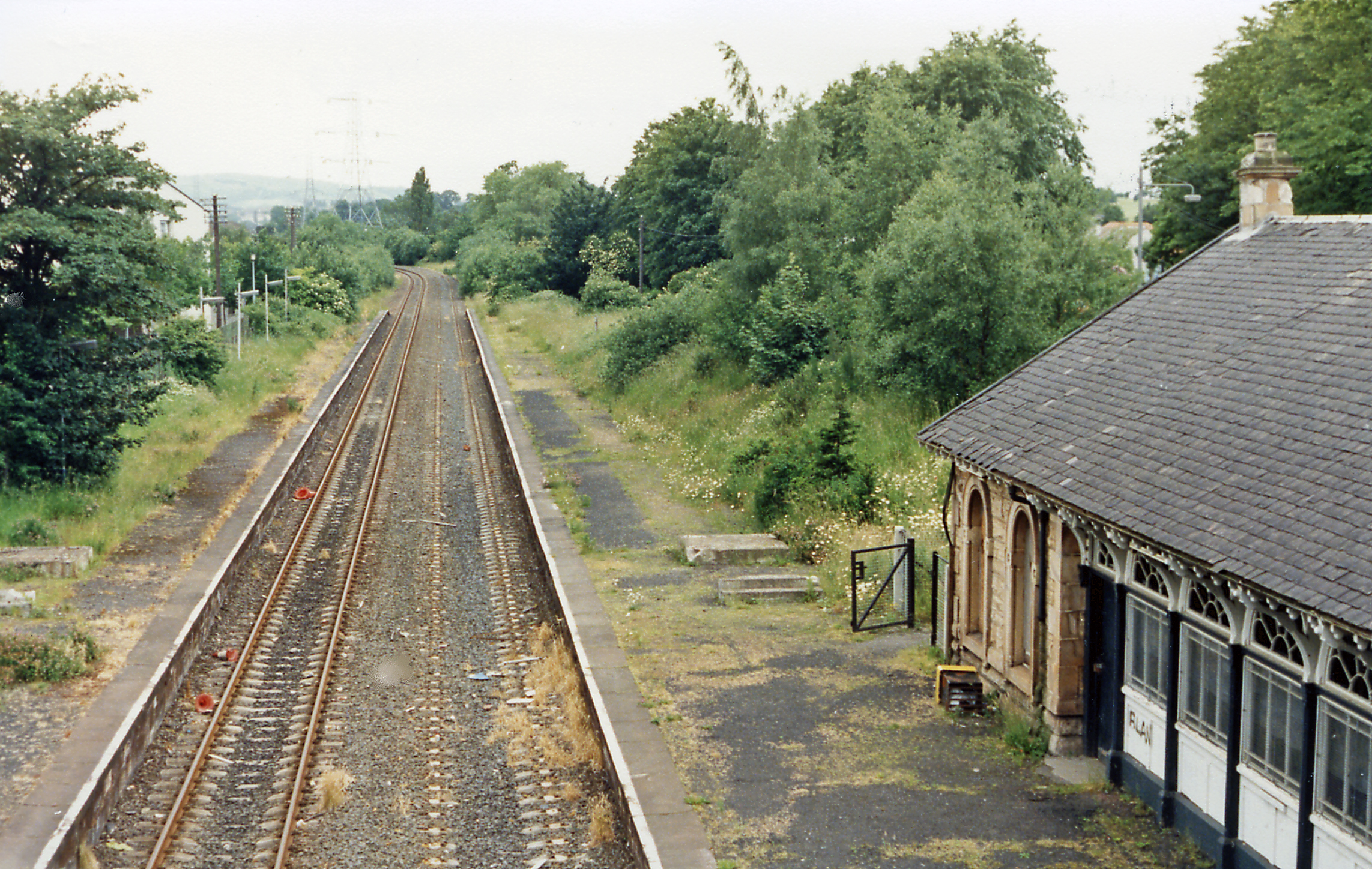
The station in 1986, 3 years after closure.

| Preceding station | National Rail | Following station |
|---|---|---|
| Hawkhead | ScotRail; Paisley Canal Line | Mosspark |
| | Historical railways | |
| Hawkhead | Glasgow and South Western Railway; Paisley Canal Line | Corkerhill |
