= Barrhead Central railway station =

Railway station serving Barrhead, Renfrewshire, Scotland

Barrhead

General information
- Location: Barrhead, Renfrewshire; Scotland
- Coordinates: 55.8010°N 4.3967°W
- Platforms: 2

Other information
- Status: Closed

History
- Pre-grouping: Glasgow and South Western Railway

Key dates
- 1 October 1902: Opened
- 1 January 1917: Closed
Location

Barrhead Central railway station was a railway station serving the town of Barrhead, Renfrewshire, Scotland. The station was on the Glasgow and South Western Railway's short-lived Barrhead Branch.

== History ==
The station opened on 1 October 1902, and closed 1 January 1917. It was originally part of a circular service that ran from Glasgow St Enoch via Potterhill, Barrhead Central and Pollokshaws West railway station before returning to St Enoch. The circular service was withdrawn on 1 October 1907, however a service still ran here from St Enoch until the station closed.

== Footnotes ==
Preceding station	Historical railways	Following station
Terminus	Glasgow and South Western Railway; Barrhead Branch	Potterhill; Line and station closed
Terminus	Glasgow and South Western Railway; Barrhead Branch	Nitshill; Line closed, station open
