= Nethercraigs Sports Complex =

Sports facility in Glasgow, Scotland

- Interactive map of Nethercraigs Sports Complex
- Location: 355 Corkerhill Road, Glasgow, G52 1RR
- Coordinates: 55.8364155°N 4.3357229°W
- Owner: Glasgow City Council
- Operator: Glasgow Life
- Surface: Various (Grass, Artificial Turf, Track)

Construction
- Opened: 2005
- Construction cost: £3.7 million

Website
- Nethercraigs Sports Complex Official Website

Nethercraigs Sports Complex (also known as Glasgow Club Nethercraigs) is a major sports facility located in the Corkerhill area of Glasgow, Scotland. Founded in 2005, the complex is designed to provide sports and recreational facilities to the local community. The complex was officially opened by Sir Alex Ferguson.

== History ==
The complex was developed with an investment of £3.7 million, aiming to provide additional sports facilities to the public. The initiative received support from local figures such as Walter Morrison and Elizabeth Campbell.

Nethercraigs was originally the home ground of the Tír Conaill Harps, a Glaswegian Gaelic football team. Following their tenure, the facility continued this association with Gaelic football, becoming the home ground and primary training pitch for the Glasgow Caledonian GAA.

Queen's Park Women have also used Nethercraigs Sports Complex for some of their SWPL 2 home matches prior to the 2024-25 SWPL season. They've since used Ochilview Park after their promotion to the SWPL.

== Facilities ==
Nethercraigs Sports Complex has many facilities:

- Artificial pitches: A 3G astro pitch suitable for football, divided into three 7-a-side pitches, plus a separate 5-a-side pitch.
- Hockey pitches: Two pitches dedicated to hockey.
- Athletics track: An outdoor track with floodlights for evening use.
- Grass pitches: Multiple pitches for football and rugby.
- Indoor facilities: Includes a gymnasium, dance studio, and spaces available for community events.
- Skate park: A designated area for skateboarding and rollerblading.

== Community ==
The complex is a hub for Pollok United, which uses the facilities to host various sporting events, including youth football leagues and fitness classes. In 2024, Glasgow City Council entered into a 25-year lease agreement with Pollok United.
