= Corkerhill railway station =

Railway station in Glasgow, Scotland

Corkerhill
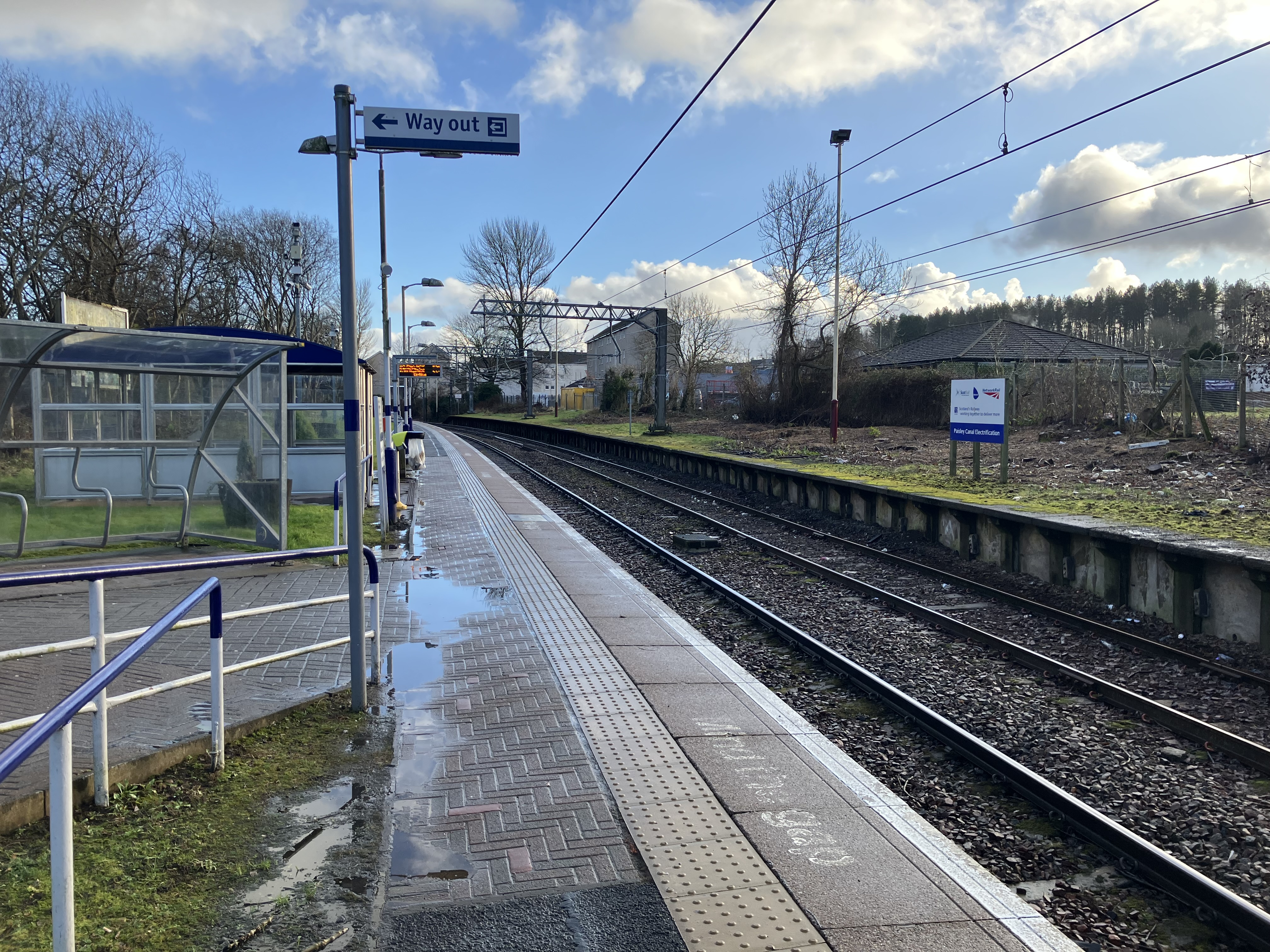
- Corkerhill station in 2026

General information
- Location: Corkerhill, Glasgow; Scotland
- Coordinates: 55.8373°N 4.3341°W
- Grid reference: NS539629
- Managed by: ScotRail
- Transit authority: SPT
- Platforms: 1

Other information
- Station code: CKH

History
- Original company: Glasgow and South Western Railway
- Post-grouping: London, Midland and Scottish Railway

Key dates
- 1 December 1896: Opened
- ?: Closed
- 14 July 1924: Reopened and renamed Corkerhill Halt
- 10 January 1983: Closed
- 28 July 1990: Reopened

Passengers
- 2020/21: ▼41,664
- 2021/22: ▲0.129 million
- 2022/23: ▲0.184 million
- 2023/24: ▲0.213 million
- 2024/25: ▼0.210 million
Location
Notes
- Passenger statistics from the Office of Rail and Road

Corkerhill railway station serves the Corkerhill and Mosspark neighbourhoods of Glasgow, Scotland. The station is managed by ScotRail and lies on the Paisley Canal Line, 3¼ miles (5 km) west of Glasgow Central.

The station was originally a staff halt on the Glasgow and South Western Railway, with a small network of houses having been built for workers at the Corkerhill Carriage Servicing Maintenance Depot (opened 1896); eventually the isolated village was swallowed up by the expanding Glasgow urban area with the construction of the Mosspark, Cardonald and Pollok estates. The station was opened to the public in 1923 and was rebuilt by British Railways in 1954.

== Services ==
=== 1967 to 1983 ===
Following the closure of the line to Greenock Princes Pier, the basic service was an hourly service to Kilmacolm. Some peak hour services to/from Paisley Canal and the Ayrshire Coast were also provided.

=== From 1990 ===
Since the reopening of the line by British Rail in 1990 services have been half-hourly eastbound to Glasgow Central and westbound to Paisley Canal, Monday to Saturdays. Currently (2016) there is an hourly service in each direction on Sundays.

Preceding station	National Rail	Following station
Mosspark	ScotRail; Paisley Canal Line	Dumbreck
	Historical railways	
Crookston; Line and Station open	Glasgow and South Western Railway; Paisley Canal Branch	Bellahouston; Station closed; Line open
Mosspark; Line and station open	London, Midland and Scottish Railway; Paisley Canal line	Bellahouston Park Halt; Line open, station closed

== Sources ==
- Butt, R. V. J. (October 1995). The Directory of Railway Stations: details every public and private passenger station, halt, platform and stopping place, past and present (1st ed.). Sparkford: Patrick Stephens Ltd. ISBN 978-1-85260-508-7. OCLC 60251199. OL 11956311M.
- Jowett, Alan (March 1989). Jowett's Railway Atlas of Great Britain and Ireland: From Pre-Grouping to the Present Day (1st ed.). Sparkford: Patrick Stephens Ltd. ISBN 978-1-85260-086-0. OCLC 22311137.
