= Dumbreck railway station =

Railway station in Glasgow, Scotland

Dumbreck Scottish Gaelic: An Dùn Breac
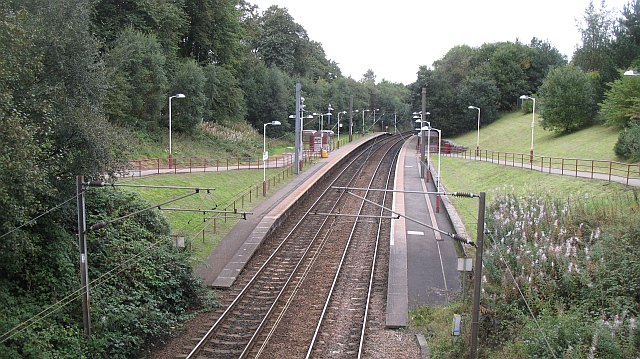
- Dumbreck station in 2008.

General information
- Location: Dumbreck, Glasgow; Scotland
- Coordinates: 55.8450°N 4.3008°W
- Grid reference: NS560637
- Managed by: ScotRail
- Transit authority: SPT
- Platforms: 2

Other information
- Station code: DUM
- Fare zone: 1

History
- Original company: British Rail

Key dates
- 28 July 1990: Opened

Passengers
- 2020/21: ▼55,936
- 2021/22: ▲89,830
- 2022/23: ▲0.119 million
- 2023/24: ▲0.160 million
- 2024/25: ▼0.149 million
Location
Notes
- Passenger statistics from the Office of Rail and Road

Dumbreck railway station is a railway station in Dumbreck, a district of Glasgow, Scotland. The station is managed by ScotRail and lies on the Paisley Canal Line, 1 3/4 miles (3 kilometres) west of Glasgow Central, close to the M77 motorway. It is accessed from the Nithsdale Road at the bridge over the railway. Dumbreck railway station is also the closest station for the Bellahouston Park and Ibrox Stadium.

== History ==
It was opened on 28 July 1990 at the same time as the reopening by British Rail of the Paisley Canal Line, which had closed to passengers in 1983. Dumbreck is situated close to the site of one of the original stations on the line, Bellahouston, which closed in 1954.

== Services ==
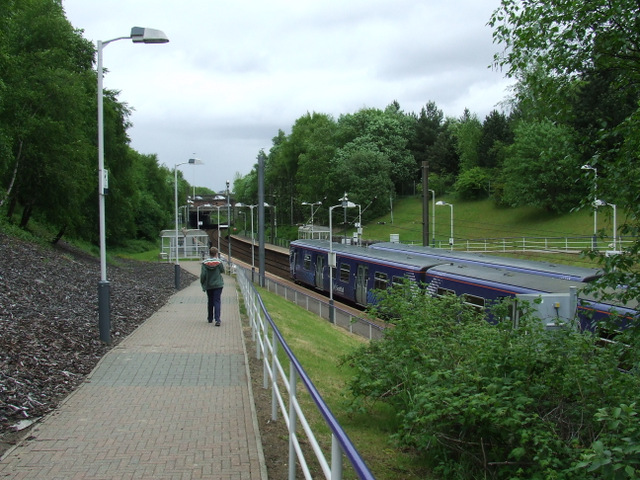
Train at Dumbreck station bound for Central

Monday to Saturdays there is a half-hourly service eastbound to Glasgow Central and westbound to Paisley Canal.

There is an hourly service on Sundays.

Preceding station	National Rail	Following station
Corkerhill	ScotRail; Paisley Canal Line	Glasgow Central

== Sources ==
- Butt, R. V. J. (October 1995). The Directory of Railway Stations: details every public and private passenger station, halt, platform and stopping place, past and present (1st ed.). Sparkford: Patrick Stephens Ltd. ISBN 978-1-85260-508-7. OCLC 60251199. OL 11956311M.
- Jowett, Alan (March 1989). Jowett's Railway Atlas of Great Britain and Ireland: From Pre-Grouping to the Present Day (1st ed.). Sparkford: Patrick Stephens Ltd. ISBN 978-1-85260-086-0. OCLC 22311137.
- Jowett, Alan (2000). Jowett's Nationalised Railway Atlas (1st ed.). Penryn, Cornwall: Atlantic Transport Publishers. ISBN 978-0-906899-99-1. OCLC 228266687.
