= Potterhill railway station =

Former railway station in Scotland

Potterhill
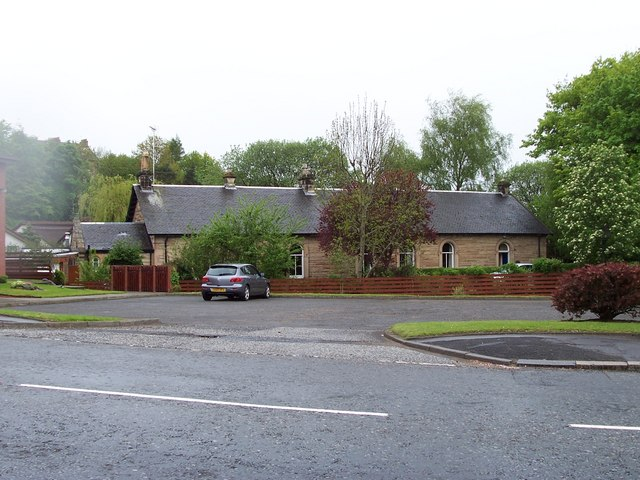
- Potterhill station in 2006.

General information
- Location: Paisley, Renfrewshire; Scotland
- Coordinates: 55.8266°N 4.4224°W
- Platforms: 2

Other information
- Status: Disused

History
- Pre-grouping: Glasgow and South Western Railway

Key dates
- 1 June 1886: Opened
- 1 January 1917: Closed for passengers
- 1959: closed for freight
Location

Potterhill railway station was a railway station to the south of Paisley, Renfrewshire, Scotland. The station was originally part of the Glasgow and South Western Railway's short-lived Barrhead Branch.

== History ==
The station opened on 1 June 1886, and was closed on 1 January 1917. Although originally an intermediate station on the 3.25 mile line between Paisley West and Barrhead Central, services between Barrhead and Potterhill were terminated in 1913, leaving Potterhill as the branch terminus for the remainder of its life. Freight services continued at this station until 1959.

== Footnotes ==
Preceding station	Historical railways	Following station
Barrhead Central; Line and station closed	Glasgow and South Western Railway; Barrhead Branch	Paisley West; Line and station closed
