= Barrhead Branch =

Former railway line in Scotland

Overview
- Headquarters: Glasgow
- Locale: Scotland
- Successor: Glasgow & South Western Railway

Technical
- Track gauge: 4 ft 8 1/2 in (1,435 mm)

The Barrhead Branch was a branch line built by the Glasgow and South Western Railway in Scotland. It connected Potterhill railway station on the south side of Paisley with a new Barrhead Central railway station. The line was sometimes known as the Barrhead Central Railway.

It was made in reaction to competition for local passenger traffic, and for a time a circular service operated from Glasgow via Paisley and Barrhead. However income from the line was disappointing, and the passenger service was cut back, finally closing in 1917. As a goods-only route it remained open until 1970. None of the line is open now.

== History ==
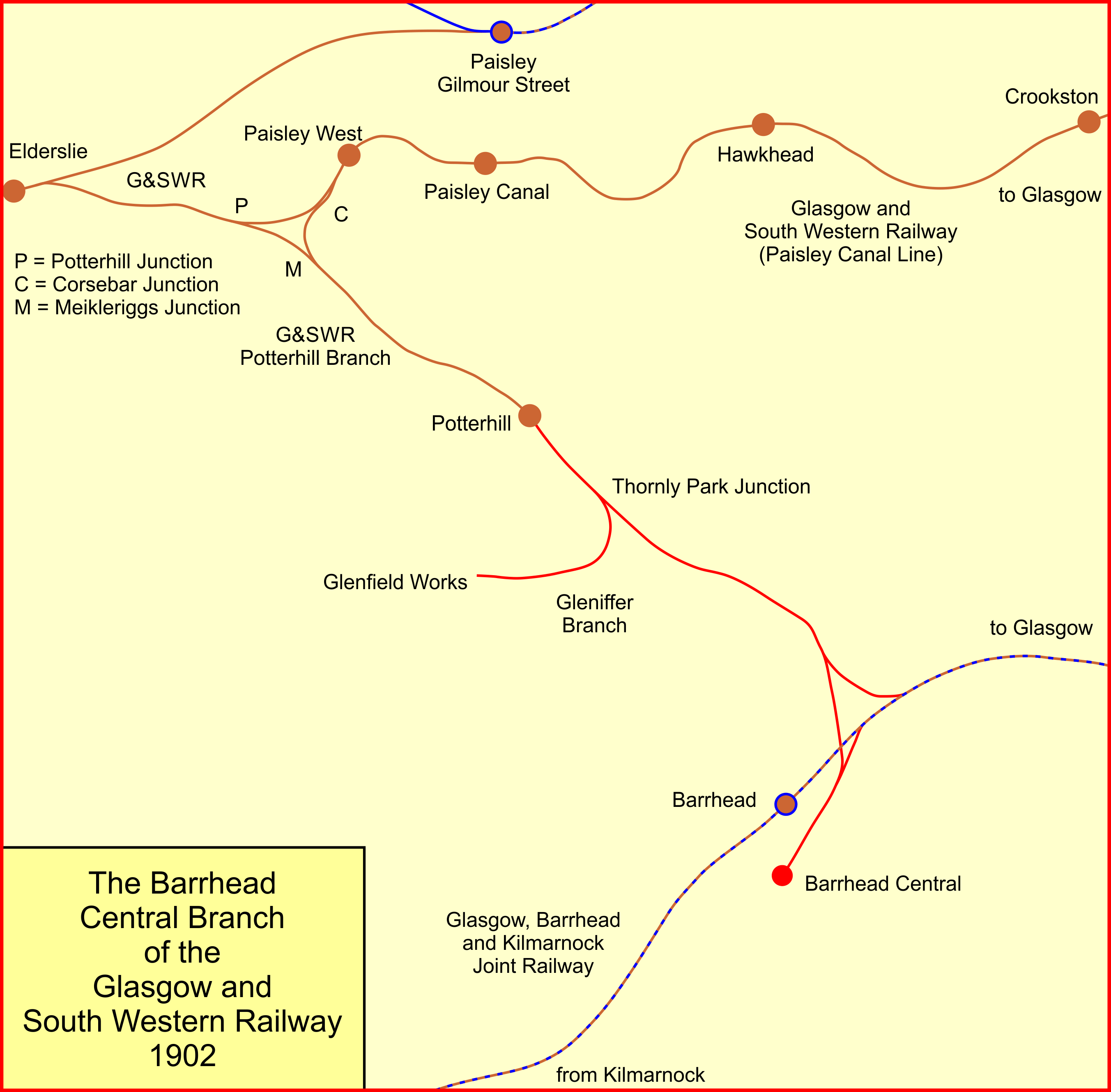
Barrhead Central Rly

Towards the end of the 19th century, the directors of the Glasgow and South Western Railway (G&SWR) realised that the emphasis for suburban passengers had moved away from infrequent services to main population centres. Moreover, in urban area, new competition was arising from omnibus services and street tramways. They responded by planning frequent services on suburban routes, calling at new stations close to developing industrial sites.

In 1885 the Paisley Canal Line opened, with stations on the south side of Paisley, and in 1886 a short branch southwards to Potterhill was opened. For the time being this remained a terminus.

There was bitter rivalry between the G&SWR and the Caledonian Railway (CR); both companies had a presence at both Paisley and Barrhead, and the CR obtained the Paisley and Barrhead District Railway Act 1897 (60 & 61 Vict. c. clxxv) giving it the authority to build the Paisley and Barrhead District Railway, serving the district between the two towns.

The G&SWR had a Barrhead station on the Glasgow, Barrhead and Kilmarnock Joint Railway (GB&KJR) but the station there was inconveniently located, and on 25 July 1898 the G&SWR obtained the Glasgow and South Western Railway Act 1898 (61 & 62 Vict. c. clix)) authorising a number of developments, including an extension of the line from Potterhill to a new central station at Barrhead, with a spur to join the GB&KJR, facing Glasgow.

The line opened on 1 October 1902; the new Barrhead station was named Barrhead Central. A circular passenger service was operated from Glasgow St Enoch via Paisley, Potterhill, Barrhead Central and Nitshill; the anti-clockwise service was described as the inner circle and the other direction was the outer circle. Barrhead Central was a terminus, and the circular service involved a reversal there.

While the more frequent service found some success in the Glasgow and Paisley urban areas, competing against omnibuses and street tramways, patronage on the more rural area between Barrhead and Paisley was disappointing. On 1 October 1907 the circular passenger service was discontinued, and trains worked from St Enoch to Barrhead Central via Paisley and Potterhill, and separately from St Enoch to Barrhead Central via Nitshill. The line between Potterhill and Barrhead Central was closed to passenger services on 1 June 1913. Operation of these services did not pay, and on 1 January 1917 under the stress of World War I conditions, both Potterhill and Barrhead Central stations were closed to passengers.

The through line continued in use for goods services, and a factory for the confectionery manufacturer Cadbury was established with a private siding connection. The line closed to all traffic on 2 March 1970.

== Railtour in 1951 ==
A rail tour operated by the Stephenson Locomotive Society ran on the line on 1 September 1951. The train started at Paisley East Goods on the Paisley and Barrhead District Railway at Cecil Street and ran to Barrhead South. It then travelled via Elderslie and Johnstone to Paisley West, and from there to the goods station at Gleniffer Depot on the Barrhead Branch.

== Topography ==
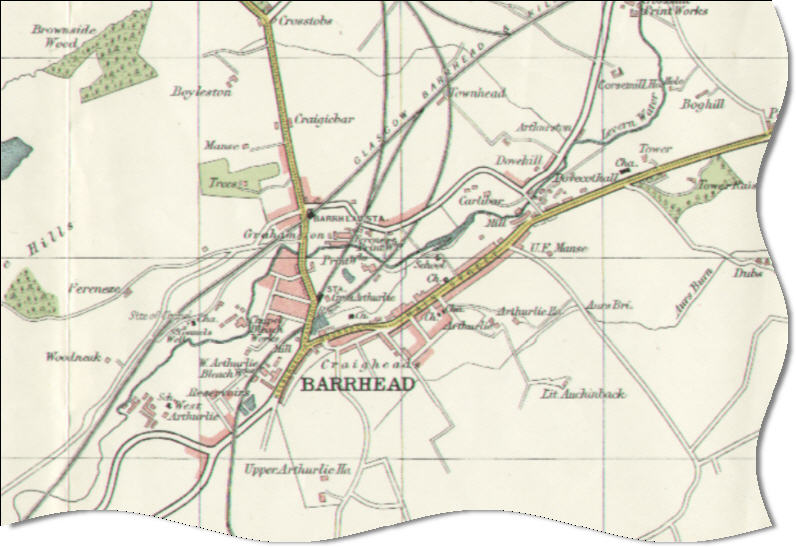
1923 map of Barrhead showing the railway lines; the north to east connection shown had long since been lifted

The line started at Potterhill railway station, which had opened in 1886 on a branch from the Paisley Canal Line. The line ran approximately south-east; shortly there was a facing junction, Thornly Park Junction, where the short Gleniffer Branch diverged, turning south and then west to serve the Glenfield works of Fulton Textile Mills; this closed in 1966. Approaching the GB&KJR main line, the branch turned south-west to cross under the GB&KJR, reaching Barrhead Central station terminus, lying south-east of the main line. A north to east spur gave access for goods trains from Potterhill towards Glasgow, and a connection from Barrhead Central station also gave access in that direction.

When the Caledonian Railway opened its Paisley and Barrhead District Railway line in 1902, it ran very close to the Barrhead Central Line, crossing over it in two places.

The Barrhead Central Railway opened from Potterhill to Glenfield Works on 21 August 1899, for goods only. It was extended to Barrhead Central and open for all traffic on 1 October 1902. The north to east spur at Barrhill closed in 1910, and the section between Potterhill and Barrhead Central closed to passengers on 1 June 1913. Barrhead Central station was closed to passengers on 1 January 1917.
