= Dumbreck =

Coordinates: 55.844831°N 4.307799°W

Dumbreck: Scottish Gaelic: An Dùn Breac
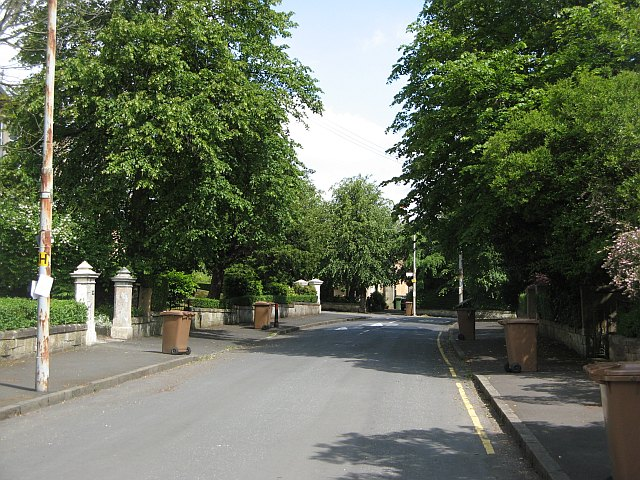
- Erskine Avenue

- Location within Glasgow
- OS grid reference: NS556637
- Council area: Glasgow City Council
- Lieutenancy area: Glasgow
- Country: Scotland
- Sovereign state: United Kingdom
- Post town: GLASGOW
- Postcode district: G41
- Dialling code: 0141
- Police: Scotland
- Fire: Scottish
- Ambulance: Scottish
- UK Parliament: Glasgow Central
- Scottish Parliament: Glasgow Southside

Dumbreck (/dʌmˈbrɛk/; Scottish Gaelic: An Dùn Breac, lit. 'the Speckled Fort' or Scottish Gaelic: Druim Breac, lit. 'Speckled Ridge') is an area in the city of Glasgow, Scotland. It is situated south of the River Clyde.

Dumbreck is a conservation area.

The district is served by Dumbreck railway station. The only church in Dumbreck is St Leo the Great RC church.

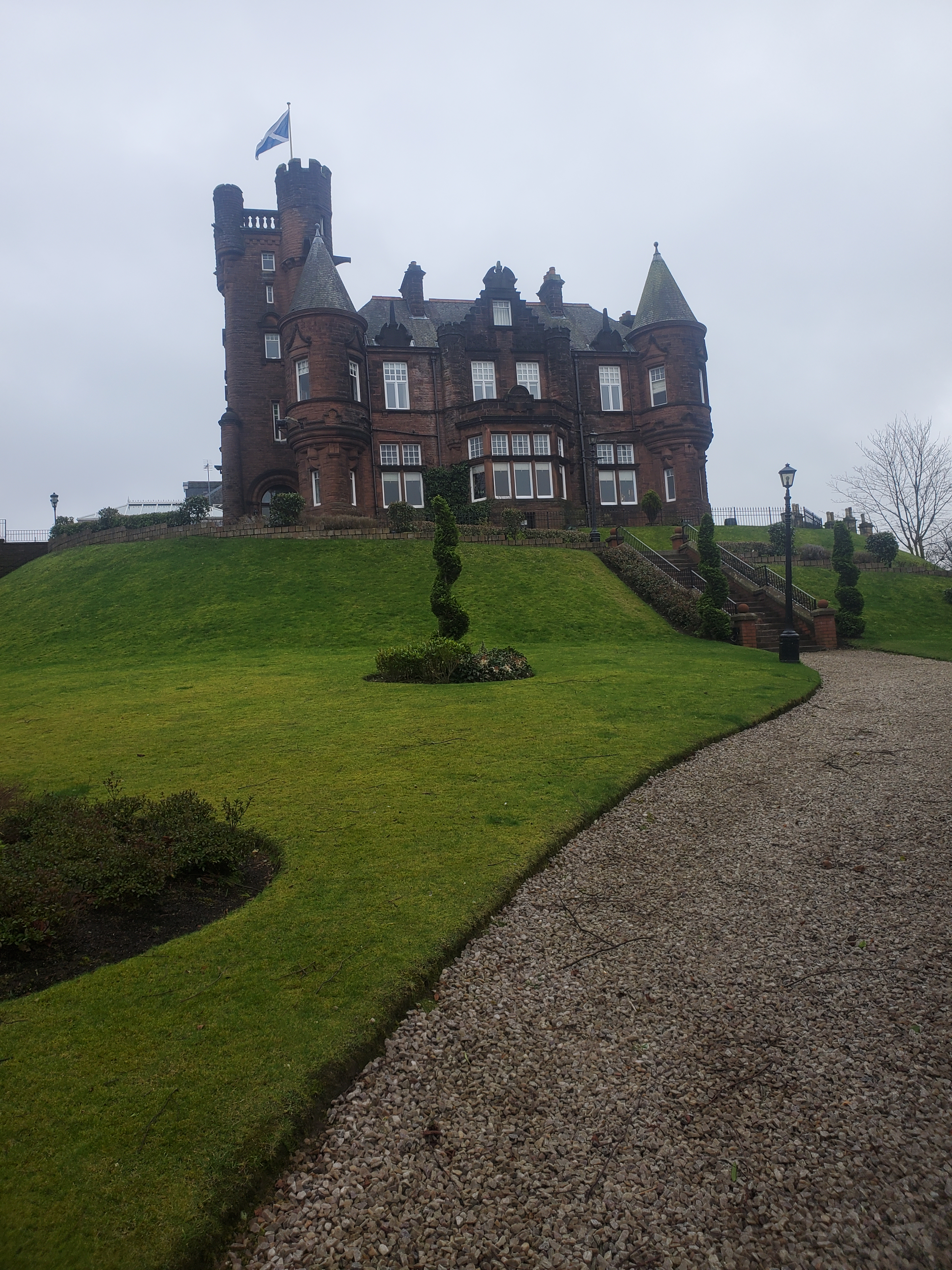
The Sherbrooke Castle Hotel, a notable Dumbreck landmark

== Notable people ==
- Archie Meiklem, Scottish footballer

== See also ==
- Glasgow tower blocks
