= Paisley Canal line =

Railway line in Scotland, United Kingdom

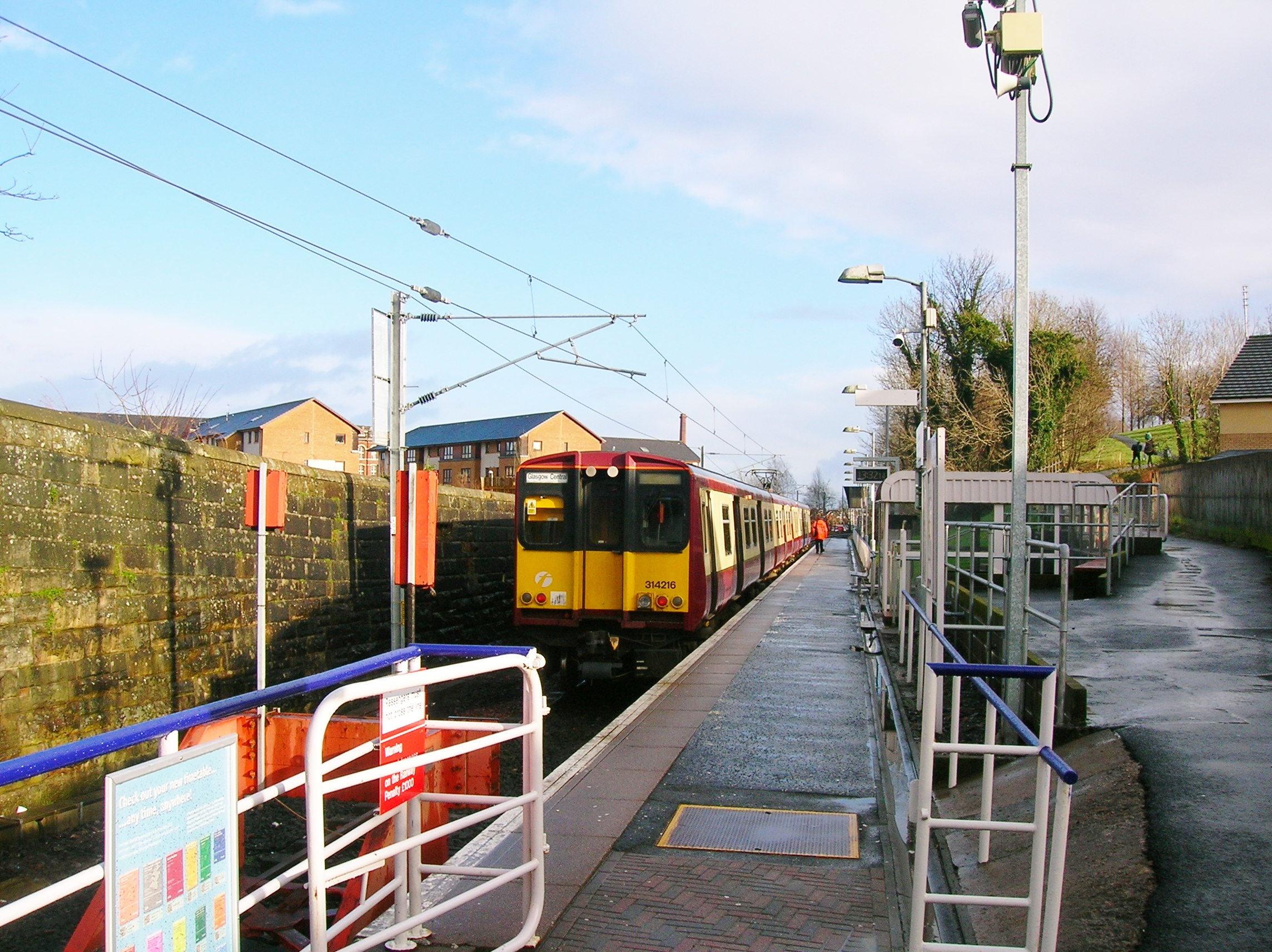
- A Class 314 service to Glasgow at Paisley Canal in 2013

Overview
- Owner: Network Rail
- Locale: Glasgow, Scotland
- Termini: Glasgow Central; Paisley Canal
- Stations: 7

Service
- System: National Rail
- Operator(s): ScotRail
- Rolling stock: Class 318; Class 320; Class 380

History
- Opened: 1885

Technical
- Number of tracks: Double track from Glasgow Central to Corkerhill Depot Single track from Corkerhill Depot to Paisley Canal
- Track gauge: 4 ft 8 1/2 in (1,435 mm)
- Electrification: 25 kV 50 Hz AC
Route map
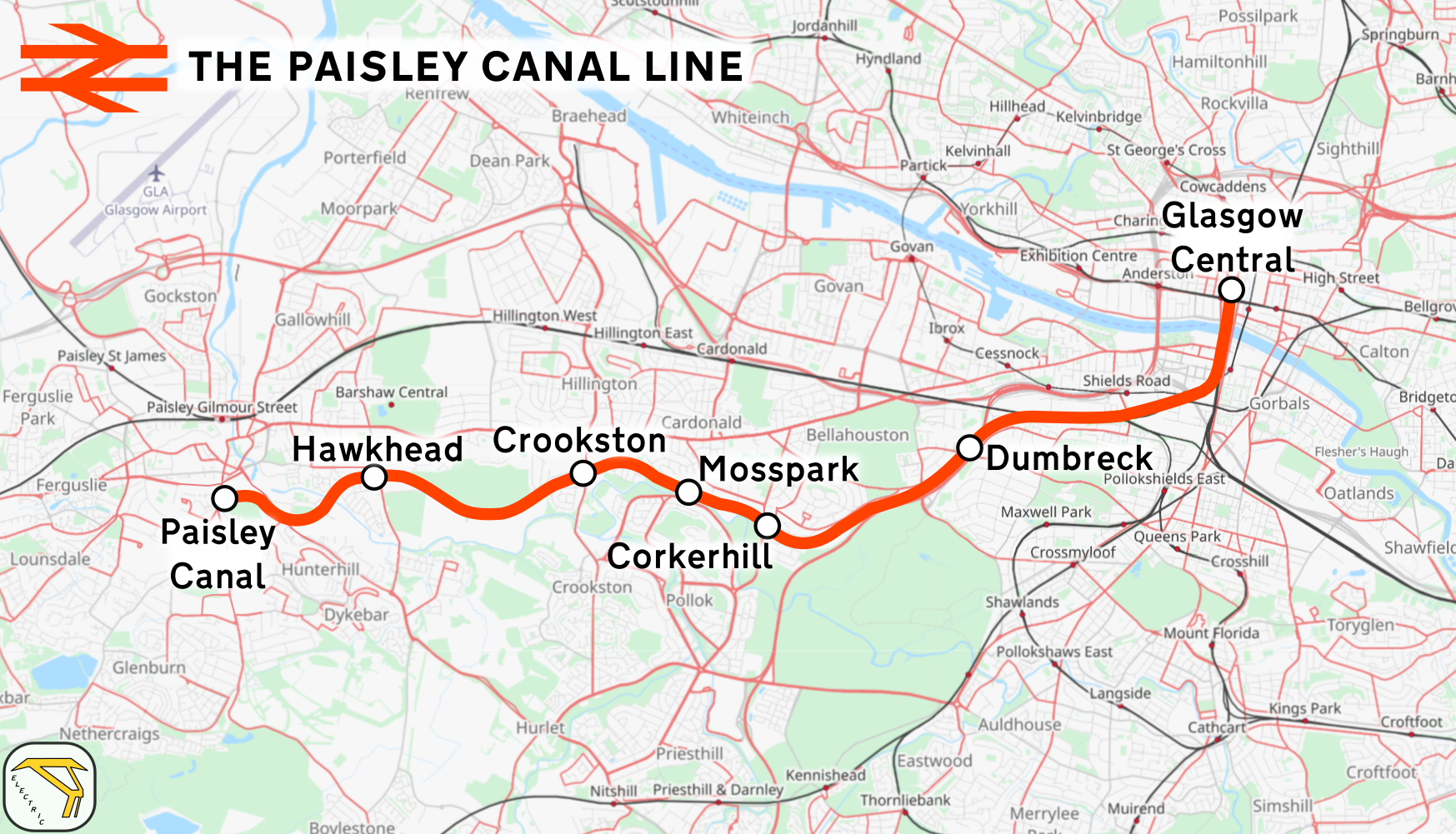
(Click to expand)

The Paisley Canal line is a branch railway line in Scotland running between Glasgow and Paisley. The line currently terminates at Paisley Canal railway station, although it previously continued through Paisley West station, near Ferguslie, to Elderslie junction where it met and crossed under the main Glasgow and South Western Railway line running from Paisley Gilmour Street station to Johnstone, and beyond. After Elderslie, the line terminated at North Johnstone, however another junction allowed services from the Paisley Canal line (also part of the Glasgow and South Western Railway Company) to continue onto the Bridge of Weir Railway and Greenock and Ayrshire Railway to the latter's terminus at Greenock Princes Pier.

The line has its origins in the ambitions of Hugh Montgomerie, 12th Earl of Eglinton, who had headed and championed both the Glasgow, Paisley and Johnstone Canal and the Ardrossan Railway. While these had been aimed to developing a route between Ardrossan and Glasgow, these routes were only part-built due to a lack of available finance for the work. During the mid-1800s, the Glasgow and South Western Railway (G&SWR) acquired both the canal and the railway. While the canal was operated as such for a time, during 1881, G&SWR set about the conversion of the canal to a railway line to relieve the Glasgow and Paisley joint line. During March 1885, the first trains commenced use of the new line.

During the 1960s, services on the line were dramatically curtailed as a result of the Beeching cuts; during these years, various stations were closed to both passenger and freight services and often demolished. On 10 January 1983, the line between Elderslie and Kilmacolm closed completely to scheduled passenger services; but the section between Hawkhead and Shields Junction remained open to serve an oil depot. A late 1980s Strathclyde Passenger Transport initiative resulted in the resumption of passenger services between Glasgow Central and a new Paisley Canal station, along with five intermediate stations, on 27 July 1990. In the years since its re-launch, additional stations have been built and opened on the route. During 2012, the entirety of the line was electrified, being furnished with a 25 kV AC overhead line for electric trains.

== History ==
=== The Ardrossan Canal ===
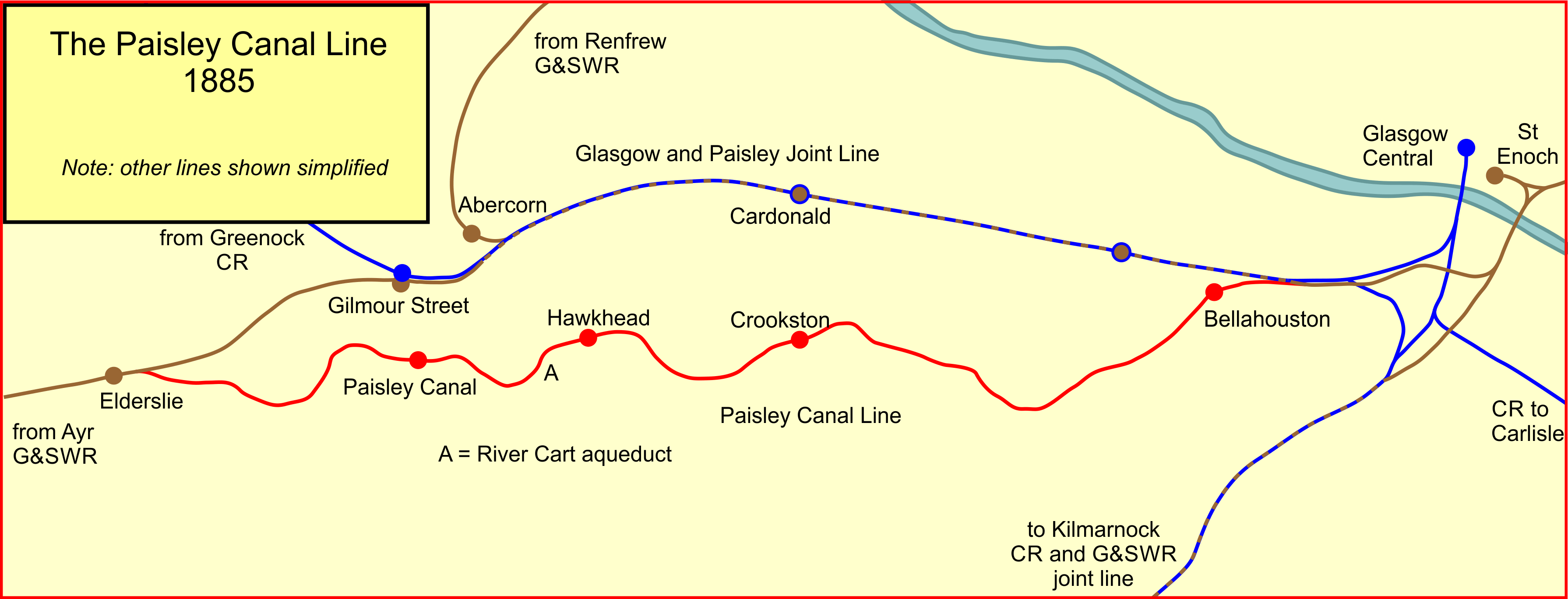
The Paisley Canal line, 1885

During the early years of the 19th century, Hugh Montgomerie, 12th Earl of Eglinton developed Ardrossan Harbour at a cost of more than £100,000: he intended for it to serve as a sea port to serve the nearby city of Glasgow, as the River Clyde was not navigable for large vessels at the time. In 1806, he obtained authority in the Glasgow, Paisley and Ardrossan Canal Act 1806 (46 Geo. 3. c. lxxv) to construct the Glasgow, Paisley and Ardrossan Canal. Montgomerie held hopes that other businessmen and investors would quickly subscribe to his scheme; however, only £44,342 would prove to be forthcoming. While work did commence on the canal at the Glasgow end; it had only reached Johnstone by the time by which all of the raised money for the endeavour had been spent; in addition, the company had also borrowed considerable sums, when combined, debts of £71,209 had been accumulated. As part of financial reconstruction efforts, the canal's name was changed to the Glasgow, Paisley and Johnstone Canal.

Later on, Montgomerie's attention turned to building a railway at the Ardrossan end of the canal's intended route; these aspirations became the Ardrossan Railway. This too was built with the aim of connecting Ardrossan to Glasgow and, just as its predecessor had, it ran out of money during construction, having only reached Kilwinning and Eglinton's collieries in the vicinity. On 5 July 1865, the G&SWR was authorised by an act of Parliament to acquire the canal, which it did so at a cost of £91,000; however, it had long since possessed a controlling stake in the canal company, having purchased its debt in connection with G&SWR's earlier acquisition of the Ardrossan Railway, with which the canal's financial affairs had been long intertwined.

Early on, the G&SWR undertook to keep the canal operational and open to traffic, as well as to pay £3,471 annually to the canal company's proprietors. At the time therefore, there had been no declared intention to use the physical infrastructure of the canal for railway-related purposes; however, at a shareholders' meeting held during 1879, the chairman referred to a newspaper article which had made claims that the G&SWR held intentions to convert the canal into a railway line. At that time, there was extreme sensitivity among shareholders over what some saw as the directors' whimsical and expensive schemes, leading to the chairman speaking out to deny the claim, stating: "That had not entered into the minds of any of the directors, nor was it thought of in the most remote manner, till they saw it in the newspaper." In the chairman's own words, the suggestion of such a conversion: "was perfect nonsense".

=== Congestion on the joint line ===
By this time, the Glasgow and South Western Railway (G&SWR) possessed an operational main line between Ayr and Carlisle; but the first section of the Ayr line was over the Glasgow and Paisley joint line. Under this structure, it was operated by a Joint Committee, which was answerable to both the G&SWR and its rival, the Caledonian Railway. This lack of sovereignty was a difficult enough prospect for the highly competitive railway politics of the era; but, as traffic developed, congestion on the busy line became a serious and obstructing issue which fuelled conflict. At that time, goods traffic was heavy and slow, thus both line capacity and service reliability were becoming heavily compromised by the high levels of traffic using the existing line.

During the 1881 parliamentary session, a bill was lodged by the G&SWR for the draining of the canal and conversion work to build a railway on its route: exactly the scheme to which the former chairman had described as perfect nonsense only two years beforehand. On this occasion, there was no serious opposition to the proposal raised, thus an act of Parliament authorising this work, the Glasgow and South-Western Railway Act 1881 (44 & 45 Vict. c. cxlix), was passed. However, this outcome had meant that the G&SWR had found itself in the position of having to raise money for the building of the new line, as well as for existing projects such as the quadrupling of the joint line and the extension of Gilmour Street station at Paisley simultaneously.

During 1881, the same year as the canal's conversion work been authorised by Parliament, it was permanently closed to traffic and drained in preparation for building the railway on top of its former route. The canal had been built as a contour line, following exactly a particular altitude; in this manner, it had avoided the use of locks at the expense of having to adopt a circuitous route between its destinations. During the reconstruction works, many of the loops and sharper turns which had been taken by the course of the canal were eased, often via the use of earthworks, as the higher-speed railway was less tolerant of sharp curves but more able to accommodate the presence of mild gradients.

=== Opening ===
During March 1885, the first goods trains started running on the new line; on 1 July 1885, it was also opened to passenger trains. In addition to serving local trains, a number of long distance expresses made use of the route; reportedly, the best time achieved from St Enoch to Paisley Canal was 17 minutes, compared with 16 minutes to Gilmour Street on the joint line.

During the following year, on 5 February 1886, the Potterhill branch of the Canal line opened; this was built to account for the expanding industrial importance of Paisley. Soon, a total of eight westbound and seven eastbound stopping trains were running each day on the Canal line; of these, five were extended to run onto or from Potterhill, while the remainder ran through to Johnstone. A triangular junction was built to provide access to the Potterhill line. The Potterhill branch would later form the base of the Barrhead Branch.

During 1894–1895, construction work on the Canal line was focused upon the building of extensive carriage sidings at Bellahouston, as well as an engine shed at nearby Corkerhill. The availability of affordable land at these locations had rendered such schemes much more economical, but came at the expense of additional empty mileage.

== Topography ==
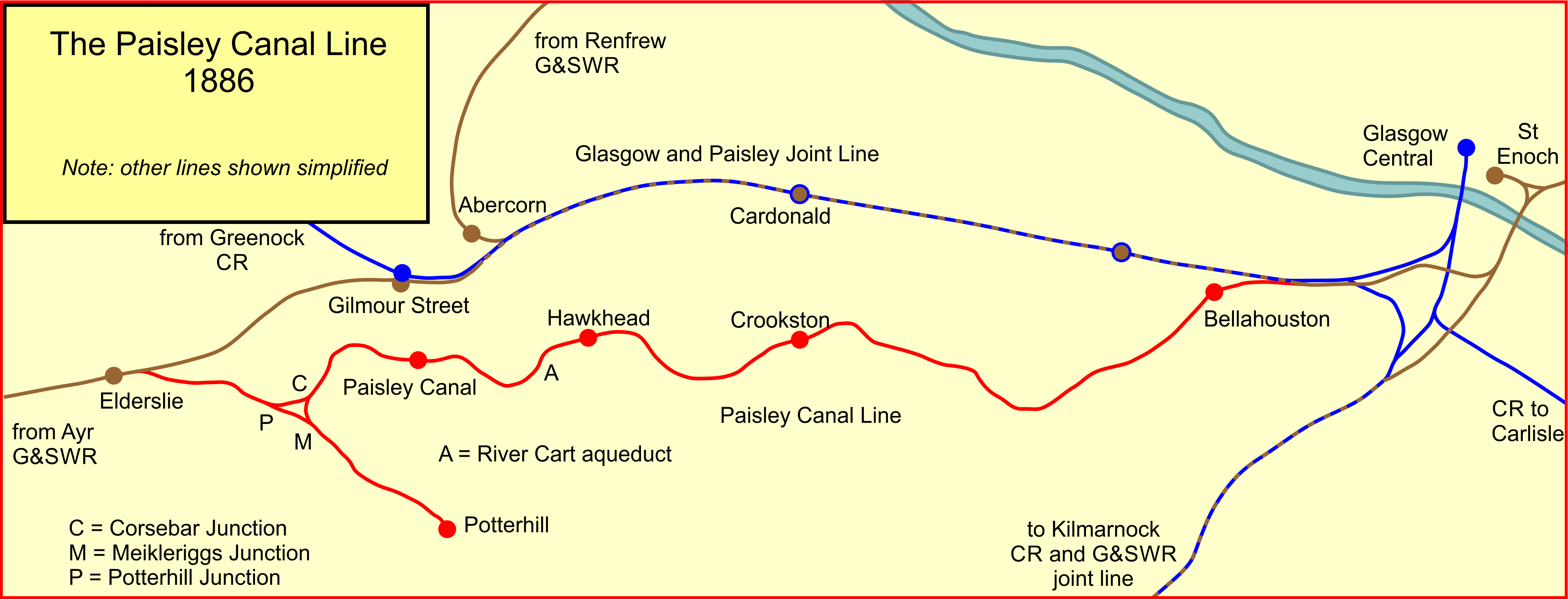
System map of the Paisley Canal Railway Line in 1886

The line left the City of Glasgow Union Railway (CGUR) at Shields Junction (at the point where the CGUR joined the joint line) and followed a course south of that route, running through the southern part of Paisley Burgh and rejoining the G&SWR line to Ayr at Elderslie. As the CGUR was controlled by the G&SWR, G&SWR passenger trains from St Enoch, and goods trains from College, could reach Ayr without the necessity of entering on any part of the joint line. Despite the easing of the worst curvature, the new Canal Line was unsuited to fast running due to the alignment. A loop in the canal was used to hold cooling water for the cotton thread mills at Ferguslie.

At Elderslie Junction it ran alongside the Glasgow and South Western Railway line running from Paisley Gilmour Street station to Johnstone and beyond, before crossing it via a dive-under crossing. The line terminated at a station at North Johnstone, however another junction near Elderslie provided access onto the Bridge of Weir Railway. This is not the G&SWR Johnstone North railway station on the Dalry and North Johnstone Line, but an earlier station of the same name at a slightly different location.

=== Locations ===
The main line was opened March 1885 to goods traffic, and on 1 July 1885 to passenger services. It was closed on 10 January 1983; and reopened from Shields Jn to Paisley Canal (new station) on 28 July 1990.

- Shields Junction; with St Enoch line;
- Bellahouston; closed except to workmen's trains 1 January 1917; reopened 1919; closed 20 September 1954. Notes: Dumbreck station opened close to the same site on 28 July 1990; there had earlier been a Bellahouston station on the Glasgow and Paisley Joint Line.
- Bellahouston Park Halt; opened by LMS 1938; closed 1 January 1939;
- Corkerhill; opened 1 December 1896;
- Mosspark; opened 1934;
- Crookston; closed January 1917; reopened 1919;
- Hawkhead; opened 1 May 1894; closed January 1917; reopened 1919;
- Paisley Canal;
- Paisley West; opened 1 June 1897; closed 14 February 1966;
- Corsebar Junction; for Potterhill branch;
- Potterhill Junction; for Potterhill branch;
- Elderslie Canal Junction; with Gilmour Street to Johnstone line.

Potterhill branch. Opened 5 February 1886. Closed

- Corsebar Junction and Potterhill Junction;
- Meikleriggs Junction;
- Potterhill; opened 1 June 1886; closed 1 January 1917.

Note: Entries in italic were not passenger stations.

=== Blackhall Bridge ===
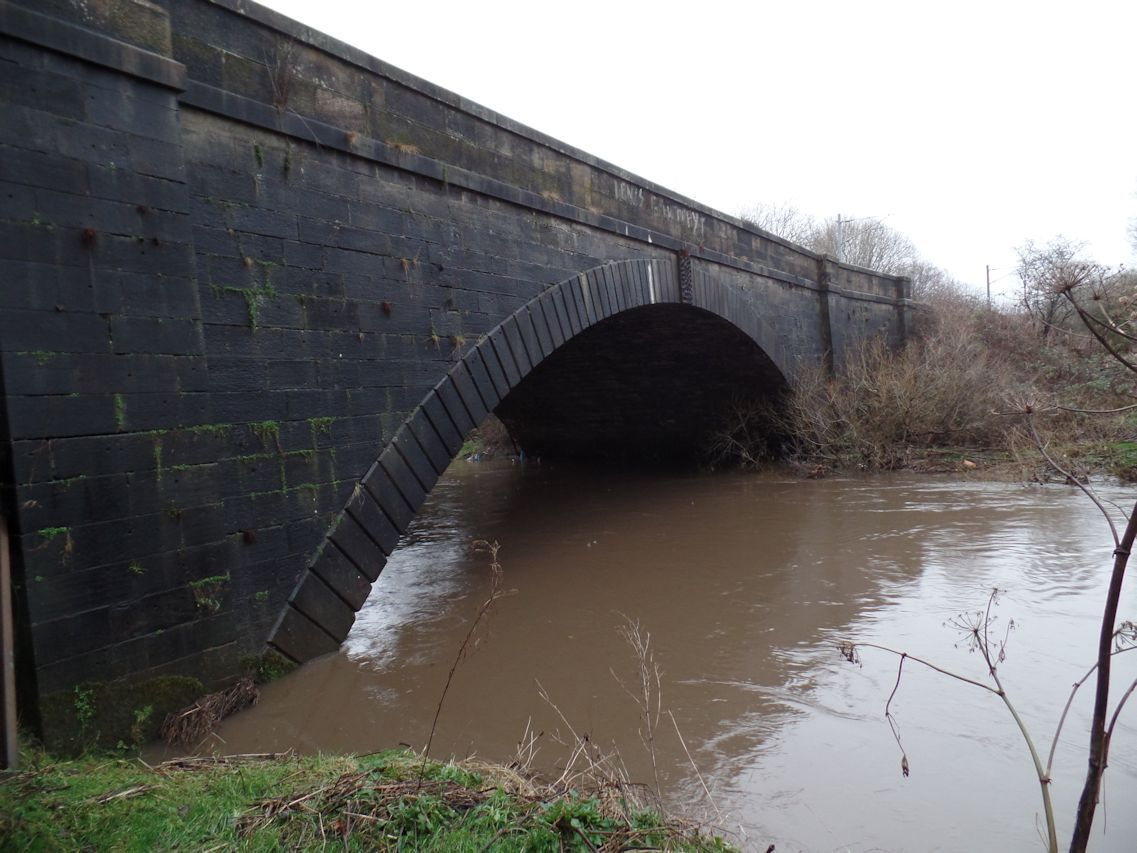
Blackhall Bridge 7 January 2015

The line crosses the White Water of Cart at Blackhall Bridge. This was originally an aqueduct, the River Cart Aqueduct, which had been built for the Ardrossan Canal between 1808 and 1810, under the direction of the famed civil engineer Thomas Telford. The contractor for the aqueduct's construction was John Simpson and the cost of construction was £5,440. It is a freestone masonry segmental arch of 88 ft 6in (27 m) span and a height over the water of about 30 feet (9 m). The bridge is probably the longest span masonry aqueduct of the canal age on a British canal, and one of the world's earliest bridges to carry a public railway. It had to be widened in order to carry the double track railway, the line also crosses the bridge at a slight skew because of the easing of the sharp canal curvature.

=== Operational difficulties ===
Author David L. Smith recounts an anecdote illustrating the difficulty of working fast trains over the Canal Line:

In later years, as a driver, Coutts got no. 80, a Manson 4-4-0, and he had her a long while. One night he was on the 5.10 with her, 50 minutes non-stop for the 41.9 miles [from St Enoch] to Ayr; Felix Hill was firing to him. Well, some of the "Heid Yins" were going down to Turnberry Hotel for the weekend, and they were travelling in the Directors' Saloon, a vehicle which Mr. C Hamilton Ellis once described as of "more than imperial splendour". The G&SW men had no such reverence for it. They called it, crudely, and no doubt unfairly, "The Shebeen". Some economist at St Enoch thought that a bit of mileage might be saved by tacking "the Shebeen" on the back of the 5.10. Now the 5.10 in those days went out by way of Paisley Canal, a route which has about as much curvature per mile as the Darjeeling-Himalayan, and with only ten minutes allowed in which to cover the first 8¼ miles to Paisley, a driver hadn't much time to ponder over radii and centrifugal force.

Away they went, thunder-and-turf, out the Canal Road. Coutts took [the curve at] Saucel at about his usual [speed], and he slid the whole crowd in "The Shebeen" under the table. Paisley Canal station did the same; and so did Elderslie. Right out at the cow's tail and getting all the wag, the distinguished party had a pretty stormy trip all the way to Ayr, at which point the murder of Coutts was strongly advocated. But when they found that Coutts had actually lost a minute to Paisley, they began to think something must be wrong with the routing, so the 5.10 was altered to run via the Glasgow and Paisley Joint Line, which was at least straight.

== Changes since 1960 ==
=== Run down of passenger services ===
The main difference between the original and current routes into Glasgow after 1966 was the alteration of Shields Junction to head to Glasgow Central instead of St Enoch. This was due to the fate of St Enoch station, which was a victim of the Beeching cuts, having been closed on 27 June 1966 to passenger services and 5 June 1967 to goods and parcel trains; the station was demolished during 1975. Since then, the St Enoch Centre (which took its name from the former occupier of the site) has been built upon the same land as had been used by the old station. During 1966, Elderslie station was also closed and demolished in the following years. Around the same time, the stations at Hawkhead and Paisley West were also closed.

For a time, passenger services continued on the Paisley Canal line up until its full closure; these ran from Glasgow Central station to Kilmacolm, while occasional trains to the Ayrshire Coast Line (using Class 101, Class 107 and Class 126 diesel multiple units among others) were also run. During the line's latter years, as a cost reduction exercise, the signal boxes were only single-shift staffed, resulting in the last train of the day being run around 7pm.

On 10 January 1983, the line between Elderslie and Kilmacolm closed completely, as well as between Elderslie and Shields Junction, to scheduled passenger services.

=== Use as a diversionary route ===
Following the closure of passenger services, the tracks between Shields Junction and Elderslie Junction were used for another two or three years to enable heavy merry-go-round coal and iron ore traffic from Hunterston Ore Terminal, on the Ayrshire Coast Line, to bypass the main line between Elderslie Junction, Paisley Gilmour Street Station and Glasgow Shields Junction. There were also occasional passenger train diversions away from Paisley Gilmour Street due to works associated with the AyrLine electrification project. However, even this traffic was diverted onto the line through Paisley Gilmour Street, and the Paisley Canal line was closed completely to all traffic between Hawkhead and Elderslie, partly as a result of the resignalling scheme associated with the AyrLine electrification project resulting in the severing of the line at Elderslie. The section between Hawkhead and Shields Junction remained open to serve the oil depot.

=== Disposal of land at Paisley Canal and beyond ===
During 1986, the track between Elderslie and Paisley Canal station was lifted, and the land around Paisley Canal station, including the line and the goods yard, was sold on and was mainly redeveloped for housing. The station building itself was converted for use as a restaurant, while the station footbridge was demolished and the space between the platforms filled in. Much of the abandoned railway line beyond the original Paisley Canal station has since been developed into a cycleway and walkway operated by Sustrans.

=== Partial reopening ===
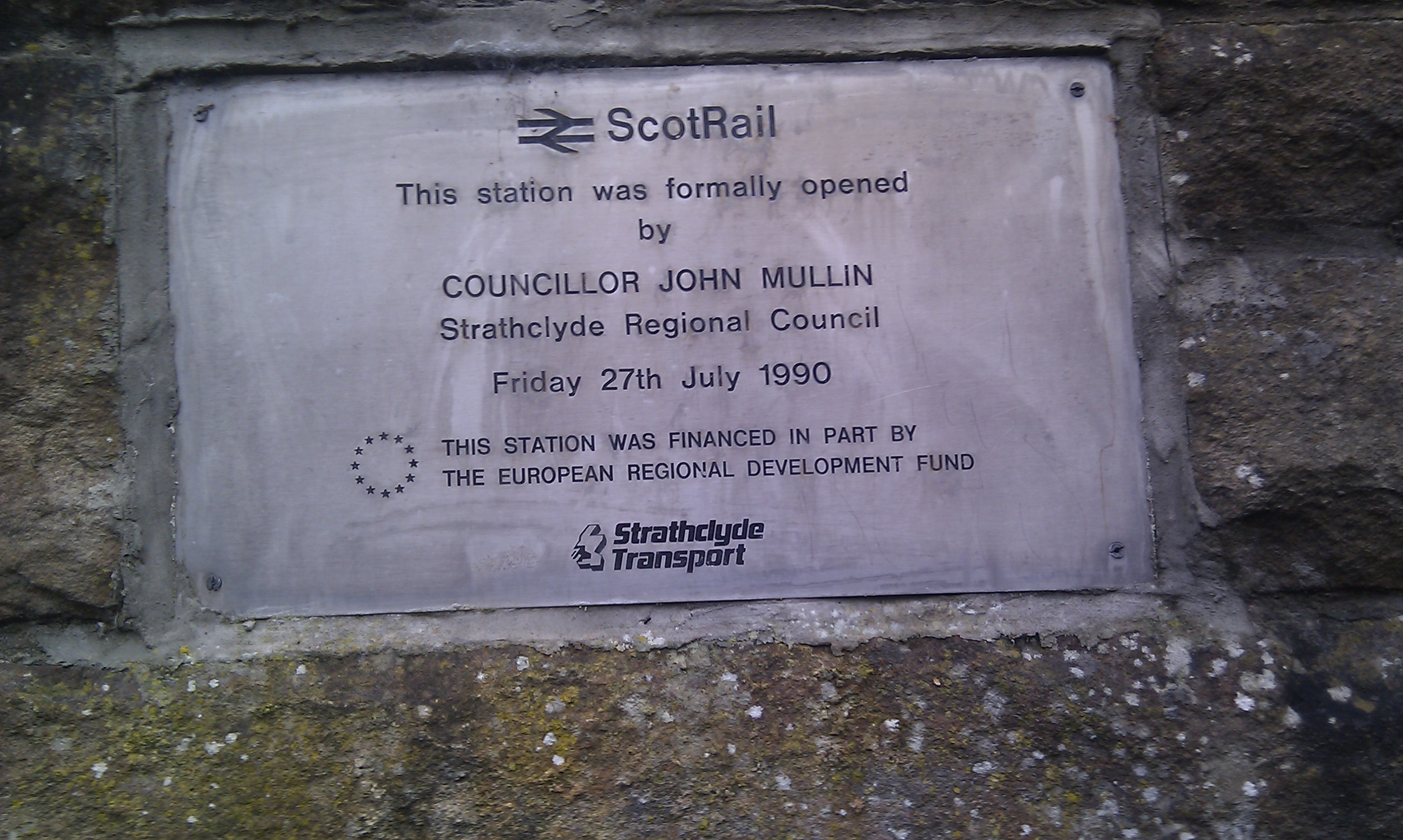
Plaque at Paisley Canal station commemorating the 1990 re-opening of the Paisley Canal branch line

On 27 July 1990, the line between Shields Junction and Paisley Canal station was reopened to passenger traffic by Strathclyde Passenger Transport and British Rail. A new Paisley Canal station was constructed just to the east of the Causeyside Street bridge.

For this reopening, the intermediate stations located at Corkerhill, Mosspark and Crookston were also restored at the same time. Subsequent to the line's re-launch, new stations at Hawkhead (one platform) and Dumbreck (two platforms) have been opened. Most stations have only a single working platform.

== Electrification ==
As part of the 1980s Ayrshire Coast Line electrification, the line between Shields Junction and Corkerhill Depot, which was around one third of the overall route, was electrified, which enabled use of the depot by electric traction. According to author David Shirres, this early electrification work helped to strengthen the business case for the subsequent full electrification of the line, as there was no need for additional high-voltage switchgear to be installed. The tight timetable of the route had also posed significant challenges to the diesel trains used in the route, although these constraints were partially the result of it being a single line, it was recognised that electric rolling stock would have less of a problem due to their greater acceleration.

Surveys of the route determined a conventional electrification scheme would have an estimated cost of between £20 and £28 million. A large proportion of these costs were due to the challenge posed by nine of the line's twelve overbridges, which required electrification clearance work under traditional practices; further difficulties were present at the site of three of these bridges, as they were adjacent to station platforms, so any track lowering would necessitate platform re-construction as well. As the high costs of a conventional approach was judged to be around twice that of which could be justified by the business case, innovative measures and compromises alike were adopted for the planned electrification work.

According to Shirres, a policy of closer working relationships between national infrastructure maintainer and owner Network Rail and franchise operators, in this case ScotRail, had the benefit of significantly reducing the cost of the line's electrification. For the six-week construction period, ScotRail waived its compensation payment rights normally associated with short notice disruptive possessions and also arranged for its sister company, First Glasgow, to accept ScotRail train tickets on local bus services. Observing that only EMUs were intended to operate the route, Network Rail developed customised overhead line equipment (OLE) for the electrification scheme; according to Brian Sweeney, Network Rail asset engineer for electrification in Scotland, traditional practices were overturned where realistic and the lowest possible wire height for EMU operation was specified, however, the pre-electrification W7 gauge was retained for the line. These combined measures had the effect of lowering the scheme's cost to £12 million.

While Network Rail's 2010, route plan update stated that the Paisley Canal electrification programme was to commence during 2014; the work in fact occurred two years earlier due to rapid and favourable progress made during the planning phase. In June 2012, Babcock International was awarded a fixed-price design and construct contract to perform all Paisley Canal electrification works with a six-month programme. During July 2012, electrification of the section of line from Corkerhill to Paisley Canal commenced. For the next six months, the majority of work was carried out during possessions held at weekends and after 8pm on Mondays to Thursdays; a nine-day blockade of the line was also necessary, during which track, bridge, and station modifications, including the rebuilding of the platform at Hawkhead station, were performed.

During November 2012, it was announced that the electrification project had been successfully completed. From December 2012 onwards, as a result of the line's electrification, Class 314, Class 318, Class 320, Class 334 and Class 380 electric multiple units have been used to operate the service. Prior to this, Class 156 diesel multiple units had been used; these have been released for duties elsewhere. Since the route's electrification, freight trains can only traverse the line with the overhead wires de-energised (and thus must be diesel), as a result of the minimum wire height of 4.030 metres (13 ft 2.7 in) being used instead of the standard minimum height of 4.165 metres (13 ft 8 in); this requirement was judged to be insignificant in the context of this particular line.

== Future ==
The reopening of the section between Paisley Canal station and Kilmacolm has been proposed.

== Connections to other lines ==
- Shields Junction with Glasgow and Paisley Joint Railway (now shared between the Ayrshire Coast Line and the Inverclyde Line); the City Union Line which it utilised to reach St Enoch railway station; the Polloc and Govan Railway; and the General Terminus and Glasgow Harbour Railway.
- Corsebar and Potterhill Junctions with the Barrhead Branch of the Glasgow and South Western Railway
- Canal Junction (Elderslie) with the Glasgow, Paisley, Kilmarnock and Ayr Railway (now part of the Ayrshire Coast Line); however, originally the Paisley Canal line continued to Johnstone, providing access to the Dalry and North Johnstone Line and the Bridge of Weir Railway without needing to cross the Glasgow, Paisley, Kilmarnock and Ayr Railway.
