= Paisley Canal railway station =

Railway station in Renfrewshire, Scotland

Paisley Canal Scottish Gaelic: Canàl Phàislig
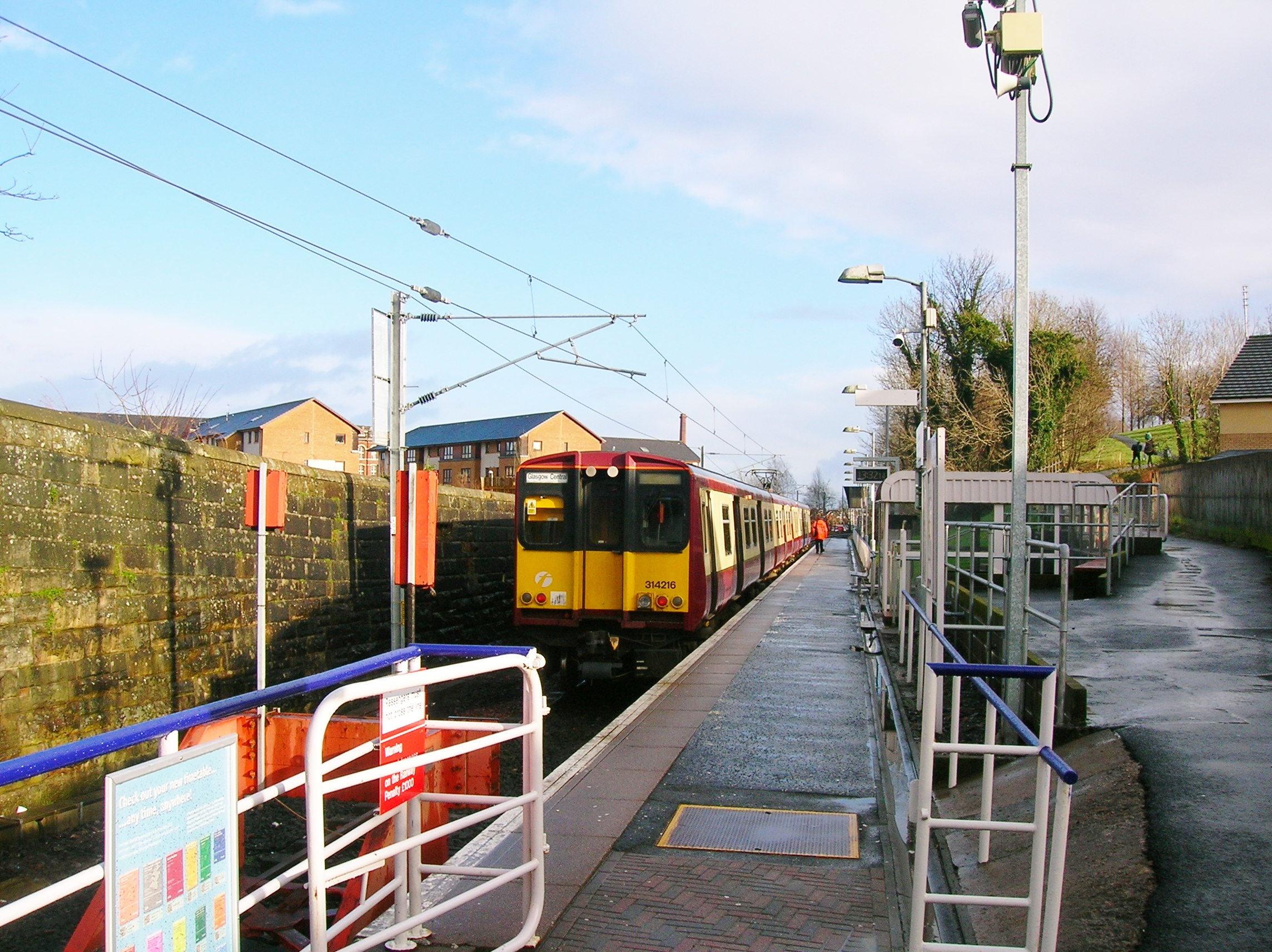
- Paisley Canal station in 2013.

General information
- Location: Paisley, Renfrewshire; Scotland
- Coordinates: 55.8402°N 4.4227°W
- Grid reference: NS483634
- Managed by: ScotRail
- Transit authority: SPT
- Platforms: 1

Other information
- Station code: PCN

History
- Original company: Glasgow and South Western Railway
- Pre-grouping: Glasgow and South Western Railway
- Post-grouping: LMS

Key dates
- 1 July 1885: Opened
- 10 January 1983: Closed
- 28 July 1990: Re-opened east of original site

Passengers
- 2020/21: ▼77,142
- 2021/22: ▲0.192 million
- 2022/23: ▲0.265 million
- 2023/24: ▲0.321 million
- 2024/25: ▼0.300 million
Location
Notes
- Passenger statistics from the Office of Rail and Road

Paisley Canal railway station is a railway station in Paisley, Renfrewshire, Scotland. The station is managed by ScotRail and lies on the Paisley Canal Line.

== History ==
The original station was opened on 1 July 1885 by the Glasgow and South Western Railway, situated on a loop line to Elderslie Junction due to congestion on the line through Paisley Gilmour Street. Following closure of the Dalry and North Johnstone Line and the Greenock Princess Pier Line in 1966, local services through Paisley Canal continued through to Kilmacolm, with the occasional boat train to Ardrossan Harbour. In the latter years the Kilmacolm service finished at 7pm. At some point the station buildings were taken out of use and an over-line booking office was built at the Causeyside Street end of the platforms.

The station closed to passengers on 10 January 1983, however seven years later a new train service was commenced on 28 July 1990. As the original station site had been sold and the platforms filled in, a new platform to the east of the Causeyside Street overbridge was constructed within the railway cutting.

== Services ==
Monday to Saturdays there is a half-hourly service eastbound to Glasgow Central.

On Sundays, an hourly service operates.

Preceding station	National Rail	Following station
Terminus	ScotRail; Paisley Canal Line	Hawkhead
	Historical railways	
Paisley West; Line and station closed	Glasgow and South Western Railway; Paisley Canal Line	Hawkhead
Paisley West until 14 February 1966	British Rail; Paisley Canal Line	Hawkhead until 14 February 1966
Bridge of Weir; February 1966 - January 1983	British Rail; Paisley Canal Line	Crookston; February 1966 - January 1983
Johnstone; February 1966 - January 1983	British Rail; Ayrshire Coast Line	Crookston; February 1966 - January 1983

== Rolling Stock ==
Since the withdrawal of the last Class 314 EMUs in December 2019 (these having formed most of the trains on the Paisley Canal branch since its electrification in 2012), the majority of services at this station have been worked by Abellio ScotRail (ScotRail since 2022) Class 380s or Class 320s although occasionally Class 318 or Class 385 sets have appeared.
