= Housing in Glasgow =

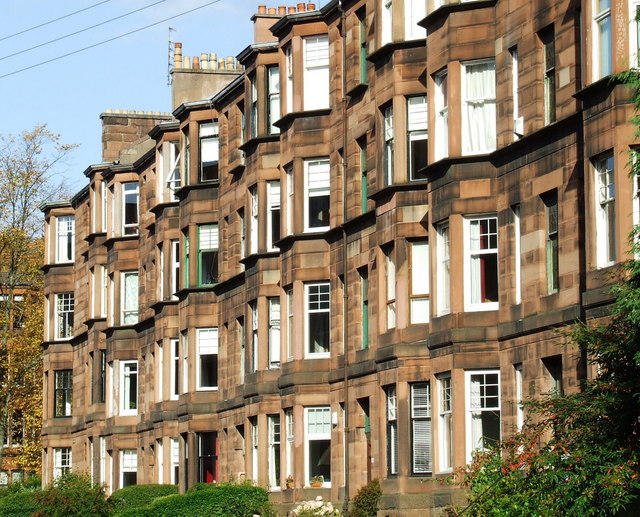
A typical Glasgow tenement block

Glasgow, the largest city in Scotland, has several distinct styles of residential buildings. Building styles reflect historical trends, such as rapid population growth in the 18th and 19th centuries, deindustrialisation and growing poverty in the late 20th century, and civic rebound in the 21st century.

== Overview ==
The city is known for its tenements, where a common stairwell is informally known as a close. These were the most popular form of housing in 19th- and 20th-century Glasgow and remain the most common form of dwelling in Glasgow today. Tenements are commonly bought by a wide range of social types and are favoured for their large rooms, high ceilings and original period features. The Hyndland area is part of the Glasgow West conservation area, and includes some tenement houses with as many as six bedrooms.

Like many cities in the UK, Glasgow witnessed the construction of high-rise housing in tower blocks in the 1960s, intended to replace the decaying tenement buildings originally constructed in the 1800s for workers who migrated to meet the local demand for labour during the Industrial Revolution.

== History ==
During the 19th century, tenement buildings were constructed to accommodate workers who migrated from the surrounding countryside, the Scottish Highlands, the rest of the United Kingdom, particularly Ireland, and further afield (Italy, Lithuania, Poland) to smaller degrees, to feed the local demand for labour during the Industrial Revolution which saw the city's population and importance increase rapidly to the extent that it became the 'second city of the Empire'. The massive demand outstripped new building and many tenements often became overcrowded and unsanitary. Parts of inner city areas like Anderston, Cowcaddens, the Garngad, Townhead and particularly the Gorbals, as well as parts of the industrialised East End (Bridgeton, the Calton, Camlachie, the Gallowgate) deteriorated into slums in which disease thrived. Efforts to improve this housing situation, most successfully with the City Improvement Trust which was established in 1866, cleared the slums of the old town. Over 15,000 houses were demolished in the early 1870s, but without equivalent provision of new housing stock.

After the Rent Strikes during World War One, lower density housing was built on the city's outskirts. Most followed the garden suburb model including a large proportion of cottage flats or 'four-in-a-block' housing with separate front doors – as at Balornock, Cardonald, Carntyne, Carnwadric, Croftfoot, Househillwood, Kelvindale, King's Park, Knightswood, Mosspark, Parkhouse, Riddrie, Sandyhills – built by just a few firms, which were well-received and have largely survived to the present day. Between the two World Wars, the area of Glasgow doubled in size.

Subsequent urban renewal initiatives following World War II, such as those motivated by the Bruce Report, and the Abercrombie Plan, entailed the demolition of slum tenement areas, the development of new towns, the building of overspill estates on the periphery of the city, and the construction of tower blocks. Several districts of the city were designated 'Comprehensive Development Areas' with the intention to raze them and rebuild from scratch with entire communities dispersed. Although the new town option was accepted, with places such as East Kilbride and Cumbernauld being established, the need for thousands of new homes was becoming ever more pressing – almost half of the dwellings in the city had been judged as overcrowded in the 1951 census while in 1957, 97% of housing in the Gorbals was still described as 'unsatisfactory sanitorially' – and with the Glasgow Corporation keen for as many citizens to remain as taxpayers within their boundaries as possible despite limited space and funds available, the overspill and tower proposals were eagerly pursued, in contrast with the trend of lower-density housing which had been preferred prior to the war but were considered to take too long to build and use too much land in comparison with the urgent need to replace so much of the inner city.

The four main peripheral developments (Castlemilk, Drumchapel, Easterhouse and Pollok) grew to become among the largest in Europe, while other smaller but substantial neighbourhoods (Arden, Barlanark, Barmulloch, Cranhill, Eastwood, Garthamlock, Merrylee, Milton, Penilee, Ruchazie, South Nitshill, Toryglen) were also constructed, largely consisting of tenement-style housing of three or four storeys. The city's initial multi-storey residential experiments in the 1950s at Crathie Court, Moss Heights and Prospecthill were largely successful (and have survived into the 21st century) but their scale of only 10 floors did not address the availability issue sufficiently, and in the next decade the number of towers commissioned by Glasgow and the height of the structures, including ambitious projects in Dalmarnock, Hutchesontown, Kennishead, Pollokshaws, Red Road, Scotstounhill, Sighthill Woodside and Wyndford, was also one of the highest across the continent.

While the facilities in dwellings in the towers and the modern tenements were an improvement on the slum housing, the large 'schemes' lacked basic amenities and employment opportunities, and were often cheaply built using pre-fabricated concrete construction methods which were ill-suited to the intemperate climate of Western Scotland. Damp quickly penetrated and spread within the new buildings which caused health problems; this was also the case with many of the tower blocks (or 'high flats' as they typically referred to by Glaswegians), many of which were surrounded by low-rise housing on a common design theme from idealised plans which seldom matched reality – in some cases, existing amenities in older districts had been swept away to provide space for the modern 'upgrades', which sometimes never materialised or were inadequate. Many residents struggled with the lack of provision made for child welfare and social needs such as hairdressing and clothing shops, there were also issues arising from the lack of help given to older members of the community in adjusting to the new buildings and amenities. Some first generation 'emigrees' chose to return to their old neighbourhoods to socialise whenever possible, creating a strange situation where otherwise desolate environments such as post-demolition Gorbals retained thriving public houses on isolated corners, with their clientele having stayed loyal despite moving several miles away to estates with no such establishments. The condition of the schemes and the towers was not helped by the decline of the city's traditional industries in the same period, with breadwinners finding themselves out of work and their families isolated on the edge of town or fifteen floors up (sometimes both) in a city with low levels of car ownership, contributing to an increase in antisocial behaviour like gang fighting and vandalism and the abuse of alcohol and drugs, all of which earned many parts of Glasgow a generalised reputation as hotbeds of violence and deprivation which should be avoided, in effect new slums in place of those they had been intended to replace just a few decades earlier.

As demonstrated elsewhere in the UK, the tower blocks gradually deteriorated, attracting crime and fostering a reputation for being undesirable low cost housing. Because many of the towers were of a standard "off the peg" design, design flaws were replicated in several areas of the city. The cost of maintaining the buildings was far higher than anticipated, though some tower blocks were upgraded in the 1980s with apex roofs and external cladding to combat damp and condensation problems and in 1992 concierge services and secure access was added to many of the blocks. That same year, the city council demolished its first tower block in the Roystonhill area, indicating that demolition was becoming the preferred solution over repair and renovation. While some of the initial tenants were still happy living in the towers and chose to stay, the low demand for the accommodation meant that those who were dissatisfied and moved out were typically replaced by 'problem' tenants with little other option whose lifestyles led to the issues worsening; more original tenants would then leave and the situation would deteriorate further until some of the blocks were almost empty. A major turning point in the city's policy towards the towers was signalled in 1993 when the decision was taken to demolish the Hutchesontown C blocks – at the time of their construction considered flagship developments, but now viewed as a monument to the planning mistakes of the 1950s and 1960s.

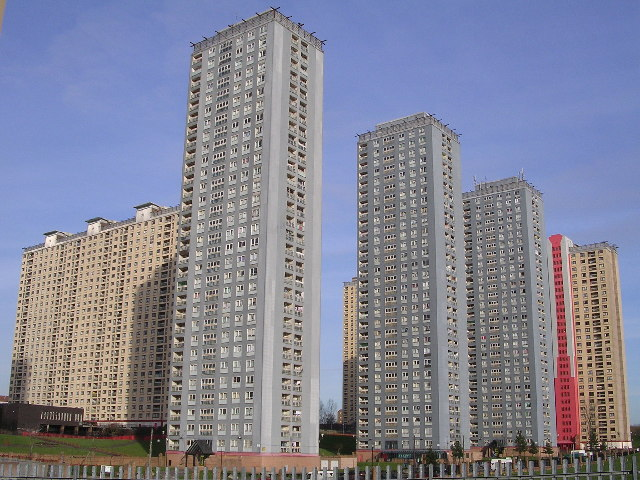
The now-demolished Red Road estate came to symbolise the mistakes of the city's 1960s housing policy.

Meanwhile, the policy of tenement demolition was now considered to have been short-sighted, wasteful and largely unsuccessful. In the East End, the Glasgow Eastern Area Renewal (GEAR) scheme which began in the late 1970s demonstrated that the tenements, if sympathetically refurbished, could be turned back into viable housing of a higher quality than many of the post-war concrete estates and towers. Following the GEAR initiative, many of Glasgow's worst tenements in areas such as Govan and Springburn also were refurbished into desirable accommodation in the 1970s and 1980s and the policy of demolition is considered to have destroyed many fine examples of a "universally admired architectural style", although this traditional style survives in many districts (with variations in design and quality) including Battlefield, Cathcart, Crosshill, Cessnock, Dennistoun, East Pollokshields, Finnieston, Govanhill, Hillhead, Hyndland, Linthouse, Partick, Possilpark, Shawlands, Shettleston, Woodlands, Yoker and Yorkhill. They have outlasted the vast majority of the inter-war rehousing grade (lower quality material) blocks intended to replace them, with developments at Barrowfield, Blackhill, the Calton, Cowlairs, Hamiltonhill, Lilybank, 'Maryhill Valley', Moorepark, Oatlands and Teucharhill having to be rebuilt from scratch by the 2010s (pockets of this style remain at Battlefield, Bridgeton, Craigton, Germiston, Govanhill, Haghill, Ibrox, Riddrie, Scotstoun, Shawlands, Shettleston, Springburn etc., mostly refurbished or better appointed from the outset).

The Glasgow Housing Association took ownership of the housing stock from the city council on 7 March 2003, and began a £96 million programme to clear and demolish many of the high-rise flats and refurbish others; such programmes had already been implemented in most of the peripheral schemes, with some refurbishment and some replacement of tenements with individual houses, and this work also continued under the GHA and local housing co-operatives.

== Future developments ==
Despite the GHA's ongoing demolition programme since the early 2000s which by 2014, had seen over 40 high rise blocks across the city demolished - high rise housing developments once again have become fashionable, however aimed at a different audience. New private developments such as the Argyle Building in 2008 have been followed by upmarket schemes such as Buchanan Wharf in Tradeston in 2022. A new wave of high rise student accommodation (PBSA) schemes have emerged in the 2020s, often replacing redundant office buildings in the city centre and making use of gap sites on its periphery. Some of the new towers are of a similar height to the social housing blocks constructed in the 1960s, with others slated to become the tallest buildings ever constructed in the city - such as The Ard in the Charing Cross area.

== Glasgow tower blocks ==
For a detailed discussion on Glasgow's tallest buildings and structures, refer to the article List of tallest buildings and structures in Glasgow

The map and list concentrates on towers of at least 12 storeys in height built between the late 1950s and early 1970s within Glasgow. Also includes early 10-storey developments at Moss Heights and Toryglen due to their importance in the uptake of the method, but does not include numerous similar developments outside the city boundaries (Note: Nearby developments include Airbles, Calderwood, Cambuslang, Clydebank, Coatbridge, Cumbernauld, Drumry, East Kilbride, Motherwell, Muirhouse, Paisley, Whitlawburn, as well as the Clydeholm towers at Yoker railway station, a few yards outside the city boundary.) nor modern residential developments (e.g. Argyle Building, Glasgow Harbour, Lancefield Quay), nor contemporary high rise buildings constructed in the 1960s/70s for commercial or academic purposes (e.g. Glasgow College of Building and Printing, Elmbank Gardens, Livingstone Tower and The Pinnacle – the latter was originally a commercial property before being converted to residential use in the early 21st century).

=== List of developments ===
As of 29 June 2025

- Key:
- = Existing development
- = Partially existing development (some blocks demolished, figures are for original completed total).
- = Demolished development
- ABC(4) = Code for development name (number of towers).
Map showing Glasgow's residential tower blocks (12 storeys or over) built between the 1950s and 1970s.

Development	Neighbourhood	Coordinates	TB	HT	DB	YB	TS	TD	YD	TR	DR	Refs.
Glasgow total	N/A	N/A	211	N/A	25330	N/A	Some	87	N/A	124	12540	
Blythswood Court	Anderston	55.860099°N 4.266424°W	3 (Note: 56 Blythswood Court – Dalriada, 323 Blythswood Court – Columba, 421 Blythswood Court – Davaar)	47	336	1967	All	0	N/A	3	336	
St Vincent Terrace	Anderston	55.862565°N 4.272279°W	2 (Note: 14 Shaftesbury Street, 52 St Vincent Terrace (part of a development of several desk-access blocks, but no others tall enough to be considered a high-rise structure))	52	176 (Note: Total for these two structures only)	1967	Some	1	2013	1	48	
Anniesland Court	Anniesland	55.891020°N 4.325166°W	1	66	126	1966	All	0	N/A	1	126	
Keal Drive	Blairdardie	55.900146°N 4.360947°W	4 (Note: 2231 Great Western Road, 2241 Great Western Road, 2251 Great Western Road, 2261 Great Western Road)	41	306	1960	All	0	N/A	4	306	
Ruby Street	Bridgeton	55.846514°N 4.220330°W	3 (Note: 112 Baltic Street, 11 Ruby Street, 31 Ruby Street)	44	252	1967	All	0	N/A	3	252	
Broomhill Drive	Broomhill	55.873967°N 4.322711°W	5 (Note: 141 Broomhill Drive, 154 Broomhill Drive, 5 Broomhill Lane, 10 Broomhill Lane, 25 Broomhill Lane)	49	510	1963	All	0	N/A	5	510	
Moss Heights (Note: The first 'multi-storey' blocks (albeit only 10 floors) in the city.)	Halfway	55.848032°N 4.340667°W	3 (Note: 20–60 Moss Heights Avenue, 80–180 Moss Heights Avenue, 200–220 Moss Heights Avenue)	28	219	1950	All	0	N/A	3	219	
Queensland Drive	Cardonald	55.852180°N 4.343493°W	2 (Note: 5 Queensland Court – Cumbrae, 15 Queensland Gardens – Bute)	58	228	1965	All	0	N/A	2	228	
Tarfside Oval	Cardonald	55.842401°N 4.337227°W	4 (Note: 20 Tarfside Oval – Caledonia Court, 40 Tarfside Oval – Meldrum Court, 60 Tarfside Oval – Roberts Court, 80 Tarfside Oval – Gowrie Court)	63	396	1966	None	4	2015	0	0	
Bogany Terrace	Castlemilk	55.802778°N 4.227222°W	1	61	114	1966	None	1	1993	0	0	
Dougrie Place	Castlemilk	55.804189°N 4.234835°W	3 (Note: 21 Dougrie Place – Muirhouse Heights, 25 Dougrie Place – Waterbank Heights, 33 Dougrie Place – Kittoch Heights)	58	231	1960	All	0	N/A	3	231	
Mitchellhill (Note: Inspiration for the Jeely Piece song about childhood living in the Glasgow towers.)	Castlemilk	55.801119°N 4.223322°W	5 (Note: 3 Mitchellhill Road – Crichton Court, 5 Mitchellhill Road – Carnbooth Court, 7 Mitchellhill Road – Netherton Court, 9 Mitchellhill Road – Cathkin Court, 11 Mitchellhill Road – Castleton Court)	58	570	1963	None	5	2005	0	0	
Dundasvale	Cowcaddens	55.869337°N 4.258912°W	3 (Note: 2 Dundasvale Court, 6 Dundasvale Court, 22 Dundasvale Court)	69	411	1968 / 1976	All	0	N/A	3	411	
Cranhill	Cranhill	55.867258°N 4.165416°W	3 (Note: 138 Fastnet Street, 7 Longstone Place, 25 Soutra Place)	52	306	1963	All	0	N/A	3	306	
Summerfield (Note: Setting for High Times (TV series).) (Note: See also: The Dalmarnock fire tests.)	Dalmarnock	55.841490°N 4.208628°W	4 (Note: 131 Allan Street, 4 Millerfield Place, 40 Millerfield Road, 50 Millerfield Road)	66	528	1962	None	4	2002, 2007	0	0	
Linkwood	Drumchapel	55.911165°N 4.367968°W	3 (Note: 15 Linkwood Crescent, 27 Linkwood Crescent, 39 Linkwood Crescent)	66	348	1962	Some	1	2016	2	216	
Drumoyne	Drumoyne	55.856797°N 4.335500°W	2 (Note: 24 Mallaig Road, 15 Mountgarrie Road)	41	112	1960	All	0	N/A	2	112	
Drygate	Duke Street	55.860074°N 4.234586°W	3 (Note: Gibson Heights, Lister Heights, Simpson Heights)	44	246	1961	All	0	N/A	3	246	
Dumbreck	Dumbreck	55.842253°N 4.312142°W	2 (Note: 20 Dumbreck Court, 40 Dumbreck Court)	63	198	1968	All	0	N/A	2	198	
Bluevale & Whitevale (Note: Tallest buildings in the city from 1968 to 2015.)	Gallowgate	55.855958°N 4.215552°W	2 (Note: 109 Bluevale Street, 51 Whitevale Street)	90	348	1963	None	2	2015	0	0	
Germiston	Germiston	55.875812°N 4.208868°W	3 (Note: 9 Coll Place, 15 Coll Place, 15 Forge Place)	52	306	1967	None	3	1992, 2008, 2011	0	0	
Hutchie B / Riverside	Hutchesontown	55.849749°N 4.243384°W	4 (Note: 12 Commercial Court, 11 Waddell Court, 39 Waddell Court, 83 Waddell Court)	52	308	1958	All	0	N/A	4	308	
Hutchie C / Queen Elizabeth Square	Hutchesontown	55.848000°N 4.246000°W	2 (Note: 2 Queen Elizabeth Square, 16–32 Queen Elizabeth Square)	58	400	1960	None	2	1993	0	0	
Hutchie D / Caledonia Road	Hutchesontown	55.844314°N 4.244205°W	4 (Note: 305 Caledonia Road, 341 Caledonia Road, 48 Cumberland Street, 474 Old Rutherglen Road)	69	552	1965	None	4	2006, 2025	0	0	
Hutchie E / Sandiefield	Gorbals	55.848429°N 4.252622°W	2 (Note: 170 Sandiefield Road, 200 Sandiefield Road)	69	384	1968	None	2	2013	0	0	
Norfolk Court	Laurieston	55.851650°N 4.255282°W	4 (Note: 5/17 Norfolk Court, 54/66 Norfolk Court, 40/80 Stirlingfauld Place, 45/85 Stirlingfauld Place)	69	1104	1970	None	4	2008, 2010, 2016	0	0	
Iona Court	Govan	55.857330°N 4.309356°W	3 (Note: 31 Iona Court, 45 Iona Court, 59 Iona Court)	58	342	1967	None	3	2013	0	0	
Berryknowes Avenue	Halfway	55.846567°N 4.336887°W	1	58	134	1974	All	0	N/A	1	134	
Broomloan Court (Note: Built on site of Albion Greyhound Stadium)	Ibrox	55.850907°N 4.313132°W	3 (Note: 5 Broomloan Court, 17 Broomloan Court, 29 Broomloan Court)	61	285	1963	None	3	2010	0	0	
Ibroxholm	Ibrox	55.851770°N 4.302467°W	3 (Note: 8 Ibroxholm Oval, 15 Ibroxholm Oval, 9 Ibrox Terrace)	63	297	1962	Some	2	2012	1	99	
Kennishead Avenue	Kennishead	55.813840°N 4.321637°W	5 (Note: 30 Kennishead Avenue, 40 Kennishead Avenue, 50 Kennishead Avenue, 60 Kennishead Avenue, 70 Kennishead Avenue)	66	660	1965	Some	2	2016	3	396	
Kirkton Avenue	Knightswood	55.887736°N 4.356689°W	5 (Note: 15 Kirkton Avenue – Cheviot Court, 55 Kirkton Avenue – Dunvegan Court, 75 Kirkton Avenue – Foyers Court, 115 Kirkton Avenue – Vorlich Court, 135 Kirkton Avenue – Pentland Court)	69	690	1965	All	0	N/A	5	690	
Lincoln Avenue	Knightswood	55.892322°N 4.350197°W	6 (Note: 150 Kestrel Road, 190 Kestrel Road – Lawers, 160 Lincoln Avenue – Ledi, 200 Lincoln Avenue – Arkle,,240 Lincoln Avenue – Arthur 280 Lincoln Avenue – Kilpatrick)	58	684	1962	Some	2	2014	4	456	
Collina Street (Note: Setting for Still Game TV series.)	Maryhill	55.892409°N 4.298808°W	1	55	113	1974	All	0	N/A	1	113	
Glenavon Road	Maryhill	55.896762°N 4.289659°W	3 (Note: 29 Glenavon Road, 71 Glenavon Road, 115 Glenavon Road)	61	360	1960	All	0	N/A	3	360	
Glenfinnan Road	Wyndford	55.889010°N 4.289200°W	5 (Note: 60 Glenfinnan Road – Strathcarron Place / Anderson, 61 Glenfinnan Road – Beauly Place / Brodie, 80 Glenfinnan Road – Fogo Place / Turnbull, 110 Glenfinnan Road – Strathy Place / Hunter, 130 Glenfinnan Road – Glenfinnan Place / Hamilton)	44	280	1961	All	0	N/A	5	280	
Wyndford Road	Wyndford	55.887451°N 4.295517°W	4 (Note: 120 Wyndford Road – Gowrie, 151 Wyndford Road – Kilmair Place / Edwards, 171 Wyndford Road – Migvie Place / Rodgers, 191 Wyndford Road – Gorstan Place / Blaker)	74	600	1964	None	4	2025	0	0	
Castlebay Drive	Milton	55.902945°N 4.253587°W	3 (Note: 27 Castlebay Drive, 69 Castlebay Drive, 123 Castlebay Drive)	49	288	1966	All	0	N/A	3	288	
Scaraway Drive	Milton	55.901812°N 4.242401°W	3 (Note: 15 Scaraway Drive, 61 Scaraway Drive, 34 Scaraway Terrace)	49	288	1966	All	0	N/A	3	288	
Cathkinview	Mount Florida	55.824651°N 4.259041°W	2 (Note: 12 Cathkinview Place – Langside Court, 15 Cathkinview Place – Battlefield Court)	58	228	1965	All	0	N/A	2	228	
Cleeves Road	Nitshill	55.812778°N 4.359097°W	1	38	48	1967	All	0	N/A	1	48	
Helenvale	Parkhead	55.847842°N 4.199744°W	3 (Note: 160 Helenvale Street, 162 Helenvale Street, 164 Helenvale Street)	44	252	1967	All	0	N/A	3	252	
Cartcraigs	Pollokshaws	55.820516°N 4.304350°W	1	49	134	1969	All	0	N/A	1	134	
Shawbridge	Pollokshaws	55.823512°N 4.299192°W	9 (Note: 23 Riverbank Street, 12 Riverford Road, 124 Shawbridge Street, 142 Shawbridge Street, 160 Shawbridge Street, 215 Shawbridge Street, 232 Shawbridge Street, 33 Shawholm Crescent, 93 Shawholm Crescent)	66	809	1961, 1962, 1964, 1968	None	9	2008, 2009, 2014, 2016	0	0	
Shawhill	Pollokshaws	55.825966°N 4.289657°W	4 (Note: 5 Birness Drive, 19 Birness Drive, 31 Birness Drive, 145 Shawhill Road)	63	454	1966	All	0	N/A	4	454	
Wester Common Road	Possilpark	55.883444°N 4.264131°W	4 (Note: 109 Wester Common Road, 151 Wester Common Road, 187 Wester Common Road, 231 Wester Common Road)	55	452	1967	All	0	N/A	4	452	
Red Road (Note: Setting for Red Road.)	Balornock	55.880355°N 4.208291°W	8 (Note: 21 Birnie Court, 10/20/30 Petershill Court, 153/183/213 Petershill Court, 33 Petershill Drive, 63 Petershill Drive, 93 Petershill Drive, 123 Petershill Drive, 10 Red Road Court)	89	1326	1962	None	8	2012, 2013, 2015	0	0	
Charles Street	Royston	55.870902°N 4.228855°W	5 (Note: 80 Charles Street – Wallace House, 90 Charles Street – Burns House, 140 Charles Street – Lomond House, 150 Charles Street – Nevis House, 160 Charles Street – Campsie House)	58	579	1959, 1969	All	0	N/A	5	579	
Rosemount Street	Royston	55.867604°N 4.223909°W	4 (Note: 20 Rosemount Street, 39 Rosemount Street, 40 Rosemount Street, 240 Roystonhill)	72	572	1966, 1970	None	4	1992, 2013, 2016	0	0	
Sandyhills	Sandyhills	55.846145°N 4.154529°W	4 (Note: 20 Balbeggie Street, 30 Balbeggie Street, 58 Strowan Street, 60 Strowan Street)	66	528	1964	All	0	N/A	4	528	
Kingsway Court	Scotstoun	55.883414°N 4.358110°W	6 (Note: 10 Kingsway Court, 20 Kingsway Court, 30 Kingsway Court, 40 Kingsway Court, 50 Kingsway Court 60 Kingsway Court)	58	684	1962	Some	2	2013	4	456	
Plean Street	Yoker	55.884216°N 4.366418°W	2 (Note: 55 Plean Street, 75 Plean Street)	58	228	1964	None	2	2010	0	0	
Fountainwell	Sighthill	55.875139°N 4.241169°W	5 (Note: 37/49 Fountainwell Avenue – Tennant Heights, 2/4 Fountainwell Place – Eagle Heights, 16/18 Fountainwell Place – Barony Heights, 6/8 Fountainwell Square – Phoenix Heights, 2/4 Fountainwell Terrace – St Rollox Heights)	58	1140	1963	None	5	2008, 2009	0	0	
Pinkston	Sighthill	55.871785°N 4.237642°W	5 (Note: 3/5 Pinkston Drive – Pinkston Heights, 16/18 Pinkston Drive – Parson Heights, 17/19 Pinkston Drive – Huntingdon Heights, 31/35 Pinkston Drive – Crawfurd Heights, 32/34 Pinkston Drive – Hartfield Heights)	58	1140	1964, 1967	None	5	2013, 2014, 2016	0	0	
Balgrayhill	Springburn	55.891233°N 4.229900°W	4 (Note: 22 Viewpoint Place, 42 Viewpoint Place, 178 Balgrayhill Road, 198 Balgrayhill Road)	74	392	1964	All	0	N/A	4	392	
Carron Street	Springburn	55.887661°N 4.236562°W	4 (Note: 53 Carbisdale Street, 12 Eccles Street, 15 Eccles Street, 195 Fernbank Street)	44	224	1961	All	0	N/A	4	224	
Springburn	Springburn	55.883351°N 4.224550°W	2 (Note: 15 Croftbank Street – Newlands, 250 Edgefauld Road – Wellfield)	74	200	1966	All	0	N/A	2	200	
Prospecthill Circus (Note: Setting for Sony Bravia 'paint' television advert.)	Toryglen	55.831843°N 4.241326°W	3 (Note: 24 Crossbank Road, 99 Prospecthill Circus, 111 Prospecthill Circus)	66	468	1963	None	3	2007, 2016	0	0	
Prospecthill Crescent	Toryglen	55.829860°N 4.232503°W	6 (Note: 3 Prospecthill Crescent, 7 Prospecthill Crescent, 11 Prospecthill Crescent, 15 Prospecthill Crescent, 19 Prospecthill Crescent, 999 Prospecthill Road)	44	232	1955, 1960	All	0	N/A	6	232	
Townhead	Townhead	55.864951°N 4.244064°W	4 (Note: 12 Dobbie's Loan Place, 15 Grafton Place, 7 St Mungo Place, 2 Taylor Place)	72	768	1967	All	0	N/A	4	768	
Curle Street	Whiteinch	55.871826°N 4.333419°W	1	61	120	1971	All	0	N/A	1	120	
Cedar Street	Woodside	55.874271°N 4.264323°W	3 (Note: Katrine Court, Lorne Court, Torridon Court)	66	315	1964	All	0	N/A	3	315	

== See also ==
- Brutalism in Sheffield
- Homelessness in Scotland
- List of council high-rise apartment buildings in the City of Leeds
- List of tallest buildings and structures in Glasgow
