= Vinegarhill =

Coordinates: 55.8552°N 4.2090°W

Vinegarhill was a location in Glasgow, Scotland, that served as a residence and place of business for travelling communities from all over the United Kingdom and beyond. All types of travellers resided there. The site of Vinegarhill, in the old weaving village of Camlachie in the east end of Glasgow, is now occupied by the Forge Retail Park.

There is some debate as to why the area was referred to as Vinegarhill. Perhaps the most likely reason is that a firm called D. King & Co. carried out vinegar production at Camlachie from 1837 to 1860.

In the 1870s, Glasgow councillors decided that the carnival and circus for Glasgow Fair, hitherto located in the Saltmarket and Glasgow Green, had to be relocated, so they moved them first to Crownpoint and then to Vinegarhill. It then became the main site for the travellers associated with the annual fair.

The postal address of East Vinegarhill was 917 Gallowgate, and the voter's roll from 1928 to 1930 shows that 190 people were registered to vote at this address.
