= Red Road Flats =

Former high-rise housing complex in Glasgow, Scotland

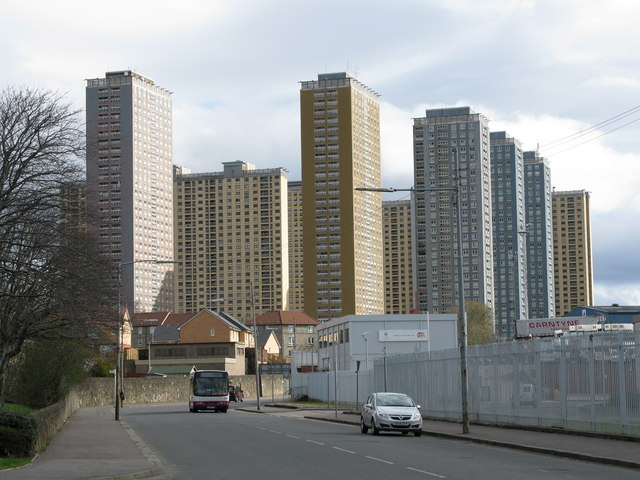
- The eight Red Road Towerblocks in March 2009

Record height
- Tallest in Scotland from 1966 to 1968^{[I]}
- Preceded by: University of Glasgow Tower
- Surpassed by: Whitevale and Bluevale Towers

General information
- Status: Demolished
- Type: Residential
- Architectural style: Brutalist / Modernist
- Location: Balornock, Glasgow, Scotland, Tower 1: 10 Red Road Court; Tower 2: 33 Petershill Drive; Tower 3: 63 Petershill Drive; Tower 4: 93 Petershill Drive; Tower 5: 123 Petershill Drive; Tower 6: 10–30 Petershill Court; Tower 7: 153–213 Petershill Drive; Tower 8: 21 Birnie Court
- Coordinates: 55°52′48.54″N 4°12′29.57″W
- Construction started: 1964
- Completed: 1966
- Opening: 1968
- Demolished: June 2012 – October 2015
- Cost: £6 million (estimated)
- Owner: Glasgow Housing Association

Height
- Roof: Point Blocks=89.0 metres (292 ft); Slab Blocks=79.0 metres (259 ft)
- Top floor: 31

Technical details
- Structural system: Steel frame
- Floor count: Point Blocks = 31; Slab Blocks = 28
- Lifts/elevators: Point Blocks = 2 Slab Blocks = 6

Design and construction
- Architect: Sam Bunton & Associates
- Developer: Glasgow Corporation
- Structural engineer: W A Fairhurst & Partners

The Red Road Flats were a mid-twentieth-century high-rise housing complex located between the districts of Balornock and Barmulloch in the northeast of the city of Glasgow, Scotland. The estate originally consisted of eight multi-storey blocks of steel frame construction. All were demolished by 2015. Two were "slabs", much wider in cross-section than they are deep. Six were "points", more of a traditional tower block shape. The slabs had 28 floors (26 occupiable and 2 mechanical), the point blocks 31 (30 occupiable and 1 mechanical), and taken together, they were designed for a population of 4,700 people. The point blocks were among the tallest buildings in Glasgow at 89 metres (292 ft), second in overall height behind the former Bluevale and Whitevale Towers in Camlachie, but still held the record for having the highest inhabitable floor and the highest floor count of any building constructed in the city.

Views from the upper floors drew the eye along the Campsie Fells to Ben Lomond and the Arrochar Alps, then west past the Erskine Bridge and out to Goat Fell on the Isle of Arran continuing south over Glasgow and East towards Edinburgh. On a clear day, the buildings were visible on the Glasgow skyline from up to 10 miles (16 kilometres) away. The 31st floor of the point blocks and the corresponding 28th floor of the slabs were reserved as a communal drying area.

Among the best-known of Glasgow's highrise housing developments of the 1960s, the buildings were formally condemned in July 2008 after a long period of decline, with their phased demolition taking place in three stages between 2010 and 2015.

== Construction ==
After the publication of the Bruce Report in 1946, Glasgow Corporation identified Comprehensive Development Areas (CDAs), which were largely inner-urban districts (such as the Gorbals, Anderston and Townhead), with a high proportion of overcrowded slum housing. These areas would see the mass demolition of overcrowded and insanitary tenement slum housing, and their replacement with lower density housing schemes to create space for modern developments. The dispersed population would be relocated to new estates built on green belt land on the outer periphery of the city's metropolitan area, with others moved out to the New Towns of Cumbernauld and East Kilbride. These initiatives began to be implemented in the late 1950s.

The building of the red Road flats

Balornock was a green belt area that had undergone little development before the construction of the Red Road estate. The original plan for Red Road was far more modest than the eventual high-rise scheme – it called for a complex of maisonettes no taller than 4 storeys. What emerged was Glasgow Corporation architect Sam Bunton's scheme to house a population of 4,700 people in 28- and 31-storey tower blocks which were at the time the highest in Europe, although they were quickly surpassed when Birmingham City Housing Department opened The Sentinels, two 32-storey council blocks in 1971 (these were themselves surpassed by the 42-storey Barbican Estate in the City of London completed in 1973).

== Completion and opening ==
The first three towers were formally opened on 28 October 1966, by the Scottish Secretary, Willie Ross. For most of the early residents the flats provided a considerable and welcome improvement to their living conditions, since most had previously lived in much worse housing, often severely overcrowded, either nearby or elsewhere in the city. From the time they were built until recent years, they were owned by the local council.

== Criticism ==
Contemporary critics of the scheme accused Bunton – who was close to retirement at the time – of championing the development as a personal vanity project; he was well known within Glasgow Corporation as a strong proponent of high-rise housing; his practice having designed other similar multi-storey estates around the city. Bunton was said to have dreamt of "building a Manhattan-style skyscraper" in Glasgow, hence the use of the steel frame construction system in place of the "system-built" pre-fabricated concrete panel method which had been used for all other tower blocks built in the city until then. This would create one of the estate's most significant legacies – steel construction had to be fire-proofed, requiring the use of asbestos, a legacy which blighted the estate in later years. Bunton argued for the steel frame in numerous letters to the Glasgow Herald in February 1963, saying "it is the best material available in the construction field since it brings into active participation an array of steel erectors, and the resources of an industry which is at present only working at one-third of its capacity", thus suggesting that local politics (primarily lobbying from Glasgow's underworked steel fabrication industries) had shaped the design of the buildings in other ways.

=== Use of asbestos ===
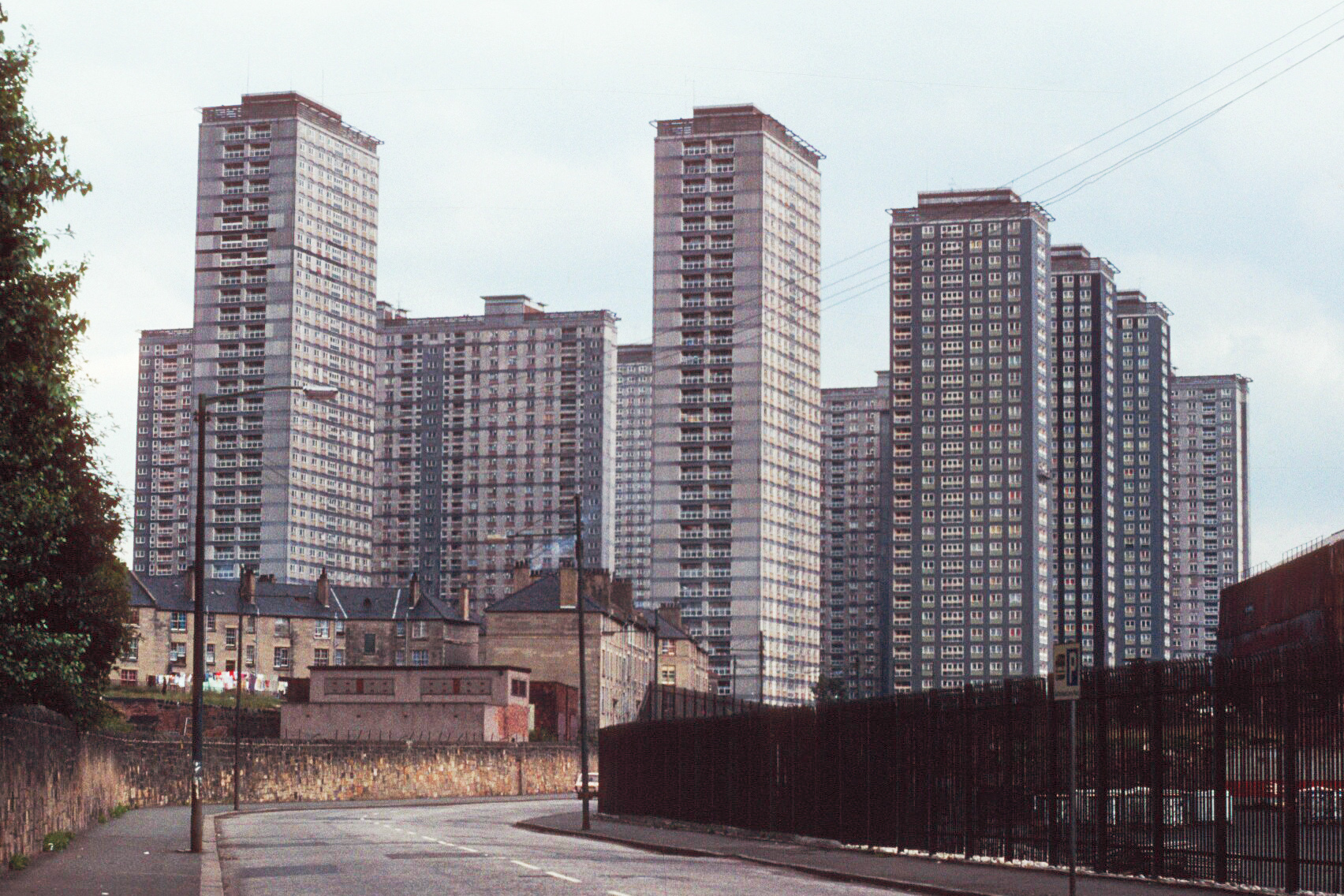
Flats seen in 1979 during the application of overcladding. Blocks 1 and 2 still showing their exposed asbestos cement board cladding

During the original construction, large amounts of asbestos were used to ensure the structural integrity of the buildings' steel frames in the event of a fire. Despite contemporary concerns over the suitability of the nature of the fire proofing solution used in the buildings, Bunton vehemently defended it, stating in an article to the International Asbestos Cement Review in 1966; "steel and asbestos in partnership with social others operate as the collective that stabilises Red Road and holds it together, albeit provisionally, as a viable, safe housing solution".

Two decades later it became widely known that the use of this material caused illnesses and deaths. Some of it was removed over the course of the life of the buildings. Between 1979 and 1982 the buildings were fitted with coloured metal overcladding to cover the exterior asbestos walls, while the slab blocks had additional external fire escapes built in the late 1980s. However, asbestos was integral to the buildings' structure and could not be fully removed until the buildings were demolished.

== Decline ==
By the 1970s the estate had gained a reputation for anti-social crime, ranging from disaffected youths throwing objects from the roofs to frequent burglaries. Such problems were less severe than those evident in parts of the city such as the nearby low-rise Blackhill estate, long dominated by ruthless crime gangs. But they were able to strike a nerve in the perceptions of non-residents, owing partly to the "looming" ambience of the blocks which in some ways might be called emblematic. The slab blocks, for example, were not only 25 storeys high but also almost 100 metres (330 ft) wide.

A major turning point came in August 1977, when a fire started by vandals in an empty flat on the 23rd floor of 10 Red Road Court, caused serious structural damage to the building, resulting in the death of a 12-year-old boy and a large number of tenants being evacuated. Many refused to return to their ruined homes, since the fire had brought to the fore the issues surrounding the asbestos lining used in the buildings, and prompted the outer refurbishment of the towers. As a mark of respect, the flat on Floor 23 of 10 Red Road Court was never let out again for rent, and instead was refurbished as a drop-in "community flat" with social amenities for the whole estate. Around 1980 the authorities declared two of the blocks (10 Red Road Court and 33 Petershill Drive) unfit as family accommodation and transferred them for use by students and the YMCA respectively. These happened to be the blocks closest to the front of the complex when approached from the city centre. Being nearest the bus stop, they were also easiest to locate for the YMCA guests and university students.

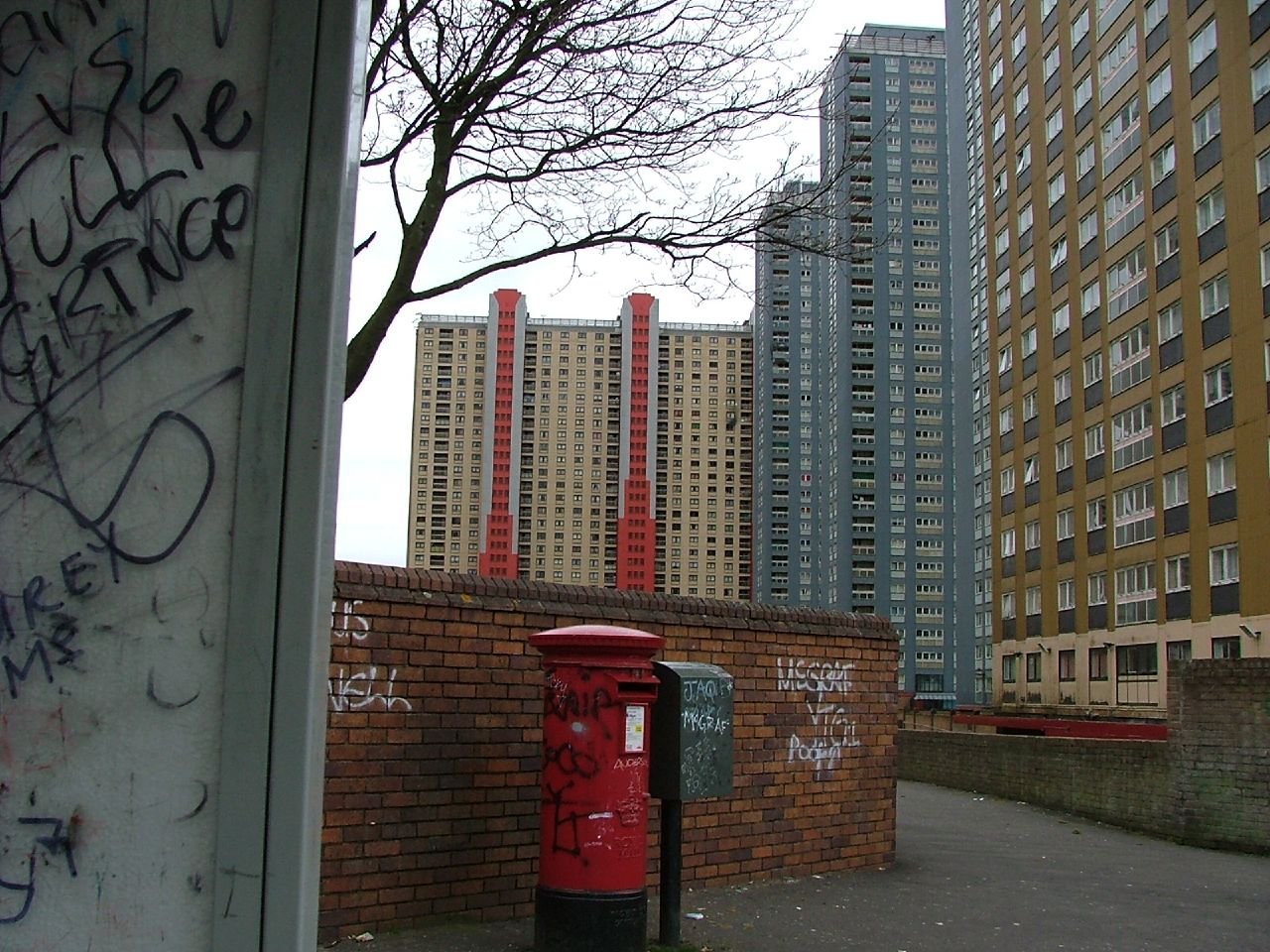
Graffiti around the flats (2004)

By the time the 1980s had dawned, it had become clear that the optimism that had surrounded the policy of high rise housing had waned in less than two decades, and despite attempts to regenerate the estate, drug dealing, muggings and other serious crime continued, and the towers also became a frequent spot for suicides. Along with the equally controversial and derided Hutchesontown C estate in the Gorbals, Red Road became increasingly looked upon as a monument to the errors of Glasgow's ambitious post-war housing renewal policy.

=== Improvements ===
Measures were introduced in the 1980s which gave residents increased protection. These included the control of access through the communal entrance doors by means of RFID keys and intercoms, and the installation of round-the-clock concierge facilities. Crime fell dramatically.

=== Refugees ===
By the 1990s, residents included refugees from the Kosovo War. Later residents included people who had fled from countries in Africa, Asia, and elsewhere in Europe.

=== Transfer to housing association ownership ===
The position changed dramatically in 2003 when the flats were transferred, after a ballot, to a housing association, namely the Glasgow Housing Association Ltd. The practice of transferring housing stock from public to private ownership had initially been launched by the Conservative Thatcher government via the Housing Act 1980 and its Scottish analogue. At that time, the recipients were individual tenants who opted to buy their homes, or long-term leases thereon. Twenty years later the policy was continued by the Labour Party led council, which transferred its entire housing stock to a single company set up for the purpose.

== Demolition ==
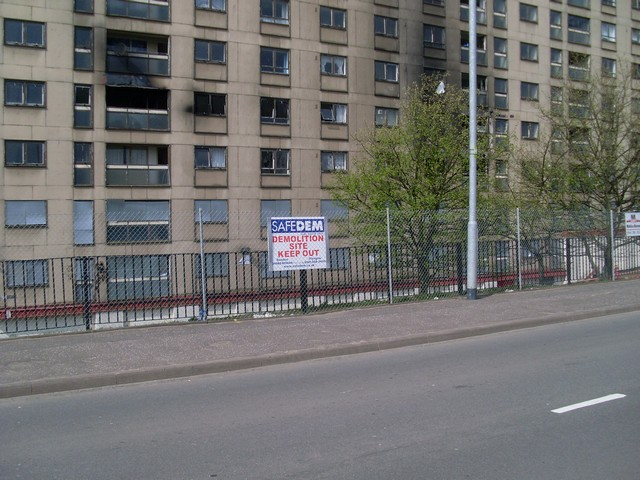
Demolition site at the Red Road flats

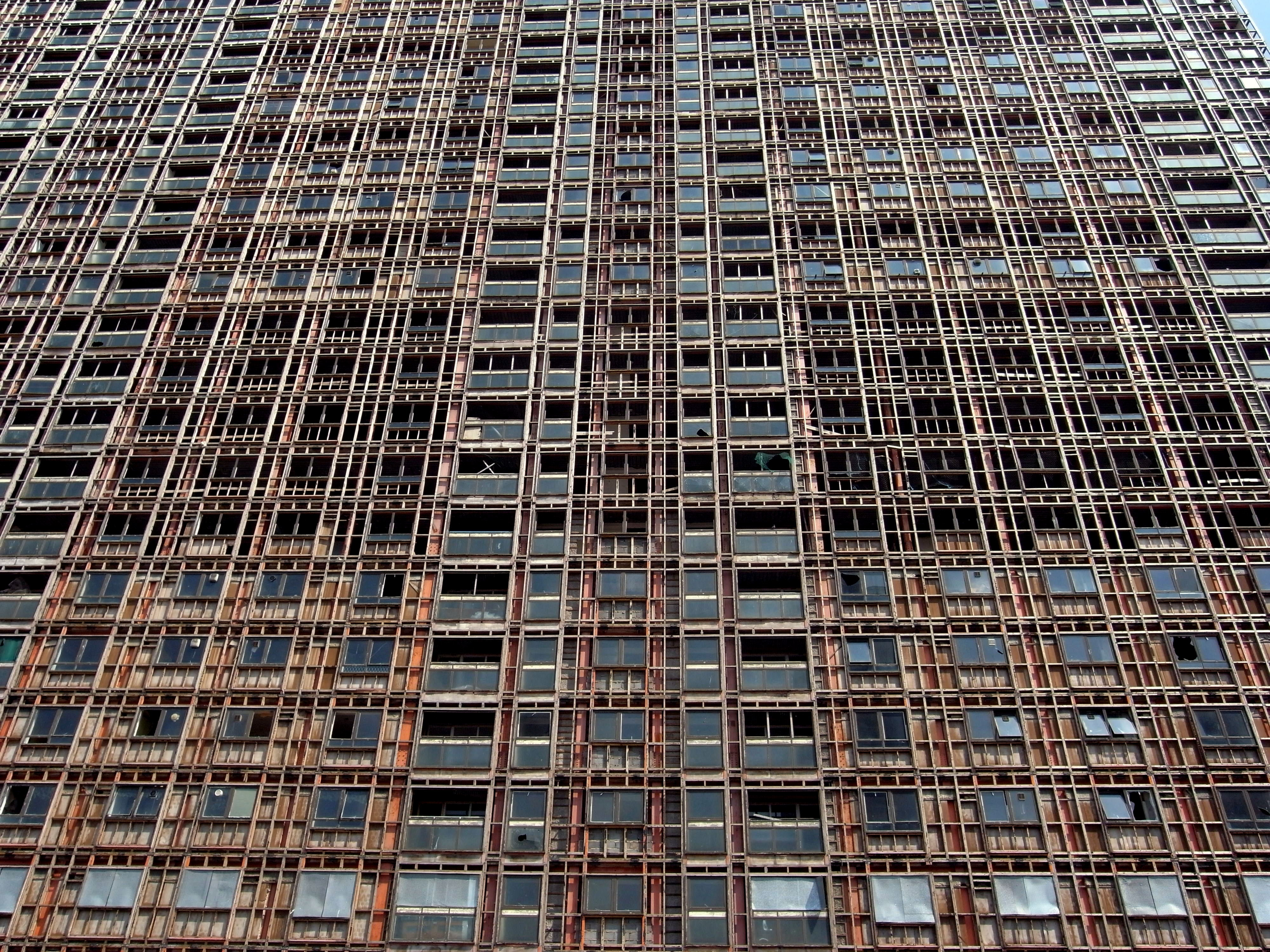
153–213 Petershill Drive (view from west, before demolition)

Soon the new landlords as well as the council insisted that repairs were costing more than receipts in rent, and that big changes therefore had to be made. In 2005 Glasgow Housing Association announced its intention to demolish one of the tallest blocks as part of a regeneration of the area.

Red Road Flats Demolition

Defend Council Housing, a pro-council housing campaign group, set up a local campaign against the demolition, seeking to ensure the scheme's continued existence. However, all the eight buildings were planned for phased demolition beginning in the spring of 2010 and expected to be accomplished within a decade.

On 7 March 2010, the Serykh family, three asylum seekers, jumped to their deaths from one of the towers. These deaths galvanised much in the way of action in and around the Red Road. Various projects now exist to document the end of the flats positively, with the hope that everyone with memories of the flats will contribute actively to the projects as best they can.

The first block, the 28-floor slab block, was demolished by controlled explosion on 10 June 2012. The steel structured tower took just six seconds to fall after a series of carefully timed explosions, using 275 kilograms (606 pounds) of explosive, ripped along the building around the sixth to eighth floors. The second block, the 31-floor point block on Birnie Court was demolished on 5 May 2013, at 11:46 a.m., taking about four seconds to fall.

In April 2014, it was announced that five of the remaining towers would be given a dramatic explosive demolition as part of the 2014 Commonwealth Games opening ceremony. The spectacle would have the 6 towers simultaneously felled by controlled explosion, with the footage being broadcast live to large screens in Celtic Park.

Former MSP Carolyn Leckie criticised the demolition plans and called for the five flats to be "demolished with dignity, not for entertainment". She has said "the image of tower blocks coming down is not a positive international spectacle" and suggests it also conveys disregard for the asylum seekers living in the sixth tower, which would remain standing. The demolition plan for the Commonwealth Games was cancelled for safety reasons, but the flats were demolished the following year.

In August 2015, Glasgow Housing Association announced that all six remaining high-rise blocks would be brought down in a one-off demolition later in 2015. The six remaining towers were demolished on 11 October 2015, after Sheriff Court interdicts (the Scottish law equivalent of an injunction) were obtained against a group of residents who refused to leave their nearby homes during the explosions. Two of the six blocks failed to completely collapse and remained partially standing. The contractors, Safedem carried out a review to determine the best way of completing the demolition and the remains of the two blocks were eventually pulled down with cables, and dismantled using excavators.

Following the demolition of the Red Road estate and that of the Bluevale/Whitevale towers, the 26-storey towers of the Balgrayhill estate in nearby Springburn assumed the title of Glasgow (and Scotland's) tallest buildings. Planned high rise housing developments for the city centre in the 2020s are projected to eventually supersede these and Red Road.

== In popular culture ==
The towers' intimidating appearance made them popular as locations by both photographers and film makers, and have been the subject of various literary works. As well as making numerous appearances in the STV police drama Taggart, the estate was featured in the 2006 film, Red Road, which won a BAFTA and the Prix de Jury (third prize) at the Cannes film festival.

In July 2007, the French high wire artist Didier Pasquette, a protégé of Philippe Petit (famous for his high wire walk between the Twin Towers of the World Trade Center in New York), undertook a high wire stunt between two of the Red Road towers, attempting to cross the 45-metre (150 ft) gap between Towers 4 and 5. Although thwarted by Glasgow's temperamental weather he managed to walk 9 metres (30 ft) across the chasm, backwards on one occasion.

From 19 February to 27 June 2010, the Red Road flats featured in the "Multi-Story" exhibition at Glasgow's Gallery of Modern Art (GOMA). Multi-story is a collaborative arts project based in the Red Road, established in 2004 by Street Level Photoworks in partnership with The Scottish Refugee Council and the YMCA.

On 14 March 2010, The Sunday Times in Scotland featured the recollections of Glasgow born film-maker, Matt Quinn, who grew up in the flats.

Glasgow Life, a part of the city authorities, have a project to document the Red Road experience. This features specially commissioned photography, film and even a novel to celebrate life in 'the scheme'. On 15 March 2010 this was updated to include volume 1 of "Your Stories" which features the recollections of the area by various local people. Alison Irvine published the novel This Road Is Red (2012); a collection of semi-fictional stories based on anecdotes from real-life residents over the 50-year history of the estate. The novel was illustrated by Mitch Miller, who produced a series of 4 dialectograms (large-scale documentary plan drawings) depicting everyday life within the flats.

The Red Road Flats were featured in the film The Legend of Barney Thomson (2015) during their demolition.

== See also ==
- Glasgow tower blocks
- List of tallest voluntarily demolished buildings
- Towers in the park
