= Gallowgate, Glasgow =

Area of Glasgow, Scotland

Coordinates: 55.855250°N 4.219136°W

Gallowgate: Scots: Gallaegait
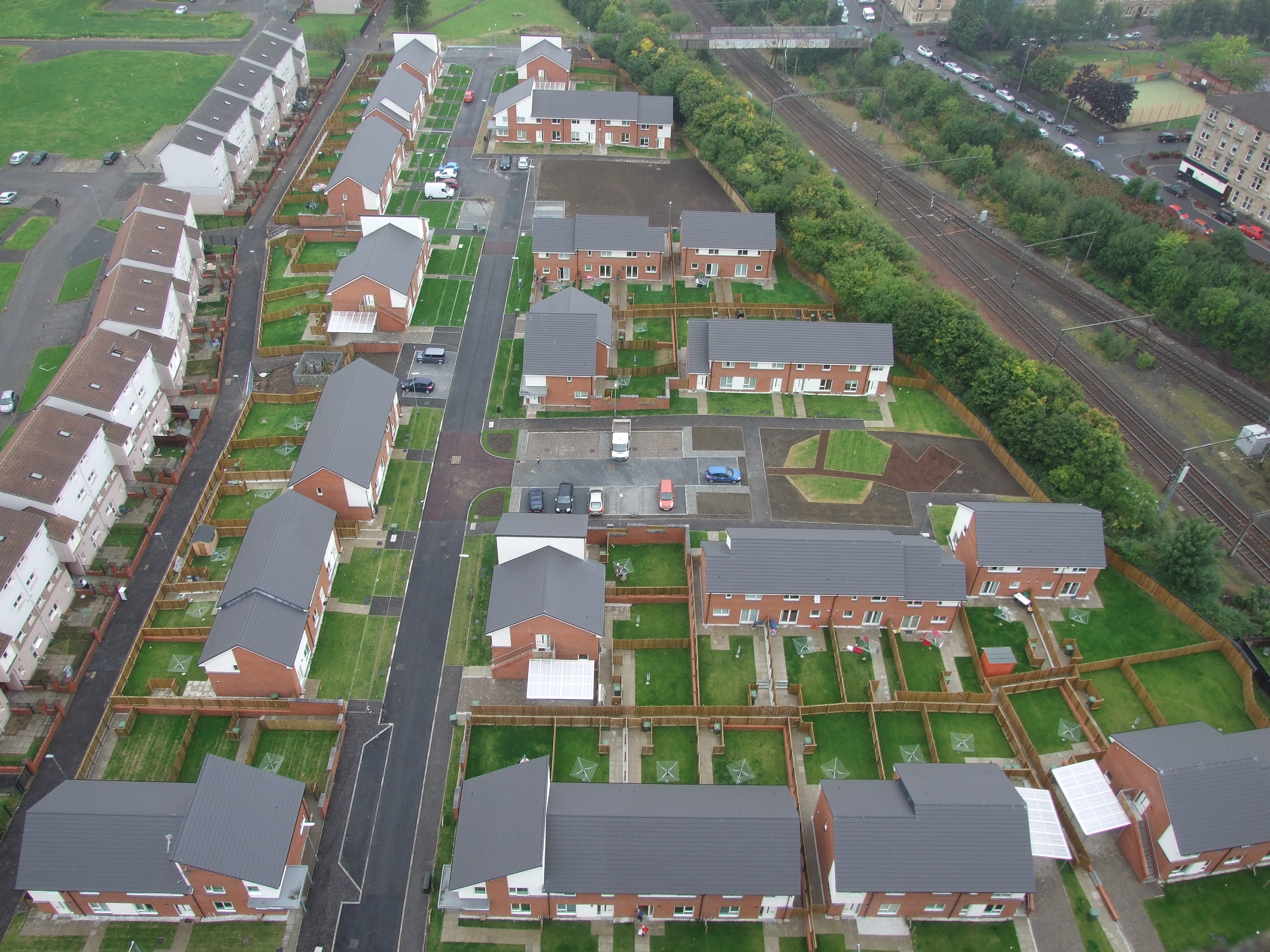
- Modern housing and older maisonettes in the Gallowgate (2013)

- Location within Glasgow
- Council area: Glasgow City Council
- Lieutenancy area: Glasgow
- Country: Scotland
- Sovereign state: United Kingdom
- Post town: GLASGOW
- Postcode district: G31 / G40
- Dialling code: 0141
- Police: Scotland
- Fire: Scottish
- Ambulance: Scottish
- UK Parliament: Glasgow East
- Scottish Parliament: Glasgow Shettleston

Gallowgate is a neighbourhood of the city of Glasgow, Scotland. It takes its name from the major thoroughfare through the territory, which is part of the A89 road. Administratively, it is part of the Calton ward of the Glasgow City Council area.

== Location and history ==
The important Gallowgate road runs from Glasgow Cross to Parkhead and includes The Barras, but only a small length of it is in the Gallowgate neighbourhood, the boundaries of which are Abercromby Street/Bellgrove Street to the west (opposite the Calton district), Fielden Street/Millerston Street to the east (at the Forge Retail Park—which is roughly on the site of the former Camlachie neighbourhood) and Crownpoint Road to the south (adjoining the Mile End industrial estate, which is part of the Bridgeton district).

The neighbourhood's northern boundary is the North Clyde Line railway with Dennistoun beyond, linked by a series of bridges. Old maps show several north-south streets using the same names on both sides of the railway tracks, but those not linked via the bridges have since been renamed on the Dennistoun side.

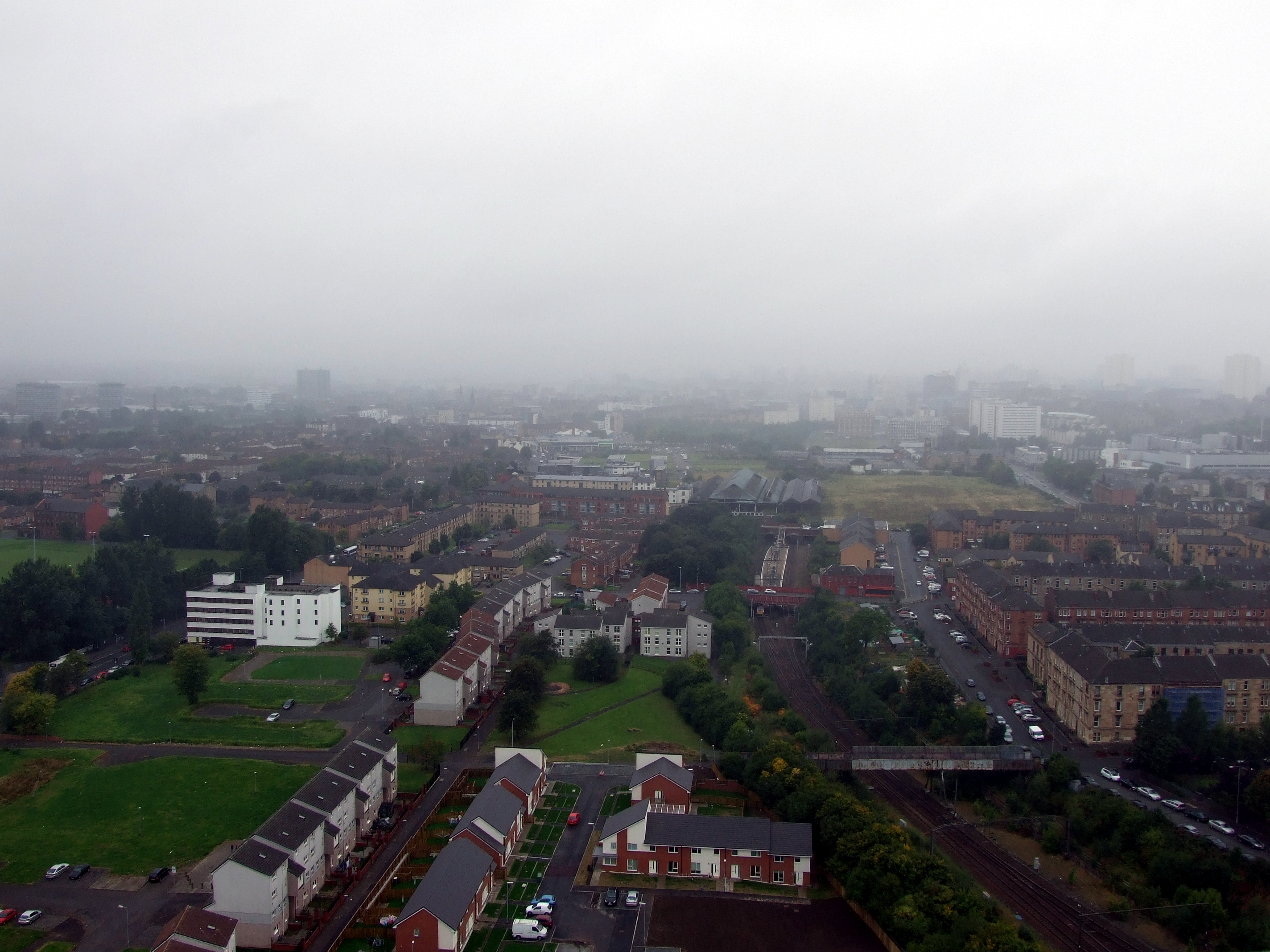
View looking west from Whitevale Tower, including the Bellgrove Hotel (left), spare ground, refurbished maisonettes and new houses (centre), Bellgrove railway station and tracks and older tenements in Dennistoun (right)

The majority of the current housing is on the north side of the main road, much of it comprising deck-access maisonettes constructed in the 1960s as a council housing scheme. However, the streets where they were built are much older, having been at the heart of a vibrant and densely populated industrial community in the East End that was largely swept away in a slum clearance program. In particular, Slatefield Street was once the location of a country house and then a brewery, Campbellfield Street was also home to a mansion and later a large school, and Rowchester Street was home to the carnival grounds, which moved to nearby Vinegarhill when they were replaced by a tram depot.

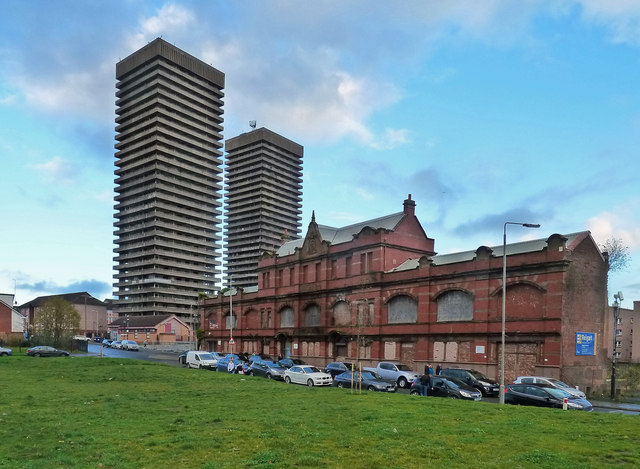
View looking north from the main road (2014) depicting the Whitevale Public Baths building and the since-demolished Bluevale and Whitevale Towers

One of the few prominent remnants of the past is the derelict Whitevale Public Baths building. Another local landmark, the art deco style Bellgrove Hotel (a homeless hostel) is also located on the north side. In the early 21st century, some of the council blocks were demolished by the Glasgow Housing Association, some were refurbished and some replaced with modern houses.

The 1960s development also included the Bluevale and Whitevale Towers, two 90-metre-high residential tower blocks that dominated the skyline in the area for almost 50 years until they were gradually deconstructed between 2014 in 2016 (they could not be demolished with explosives because of close proximity to the railway and other buildings).

St Mungo's Academy – a secondary school completed in 1976 to replace the original campus in the Townhead district – and the Crownpoint Sports Centre (home of the Shettleston Harriers athletics club) and its playing fields are on the south side of the road, along with St Anne's RC Primary School and some modern apartment blocks.

Commerce is very limited within the neighbourhood, but the wide range of shops at The Forge are within walking distance, as are a range of local cafes and pubs on Duke Street, Dennistoun and at Bridgeton Cross.

=== Transport ===
Bellgrove railway station provides a rail link to central Glasgow and also to Edinburgh in the opposite direction, while bus services (operated by First Glasgow) reflect the status of Gallowgate as a major transit corridor: the frequent '2', '61' and '240' services all use the route, with two of these including a night provision.

=== Notable residents ===
- Robert Snodgrass, footballer (Scotland)
- Jon Campbell, Singer-songwriter, musician, producer (TTF)
