= Anniesland Court =

Coordinates: 55°53′28″N 4°19′30″W

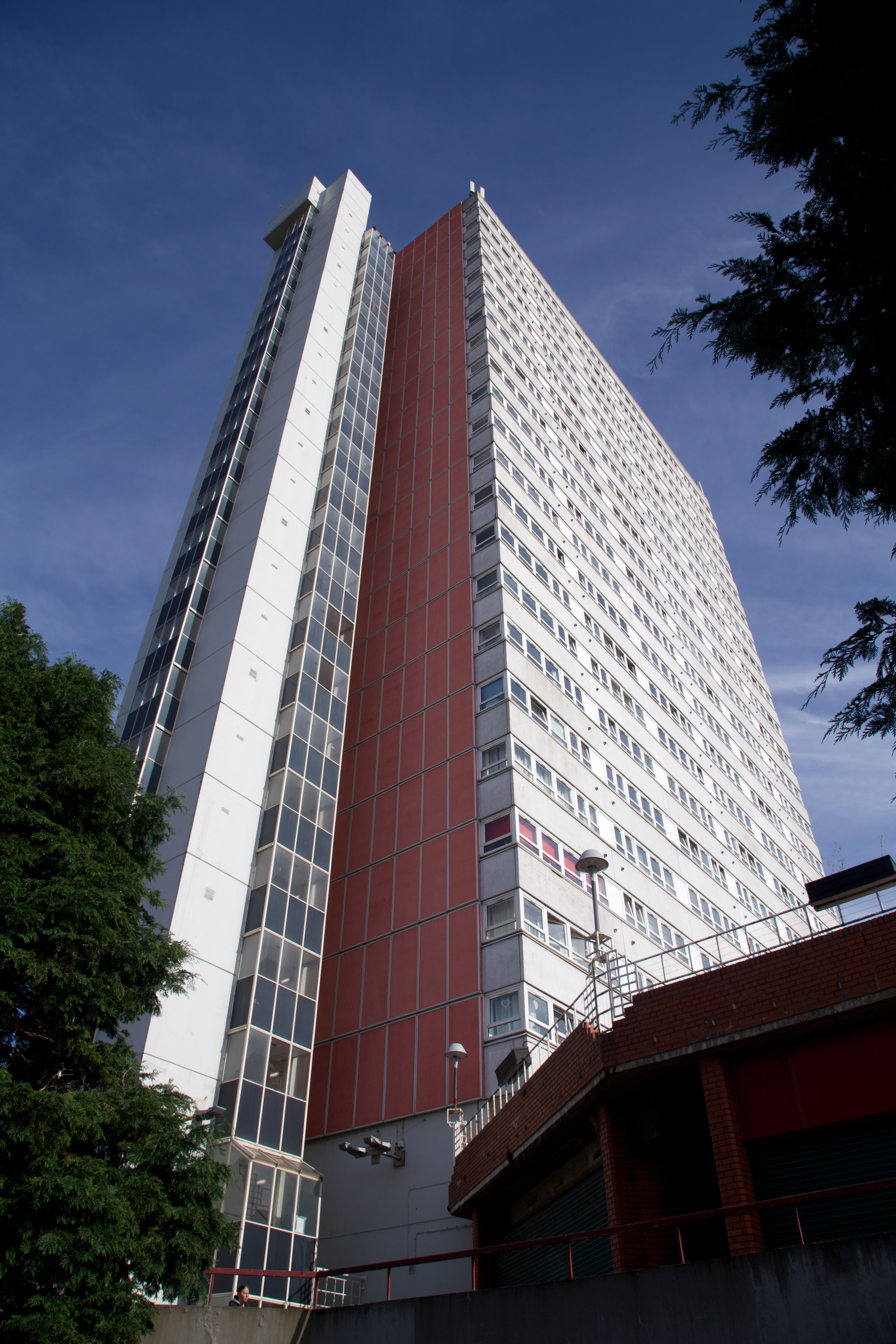
- Anniesland Court viewed from south-west
- Interactive map of the Anniesland Court area

General information
- Status: Completed
- Type: Mixed usage, residential
- Architectural style: Brutalist
- Location: Anniesland, Glasgow, Scotland
- Completed: 1968

Height
- Roof: 66.0 metres (217 ft)
- Top floor: 24

Technical details
- Floor count: 22
- Lifts/elevators: 2

Design and construction
- Architects: J Holmes & Partners

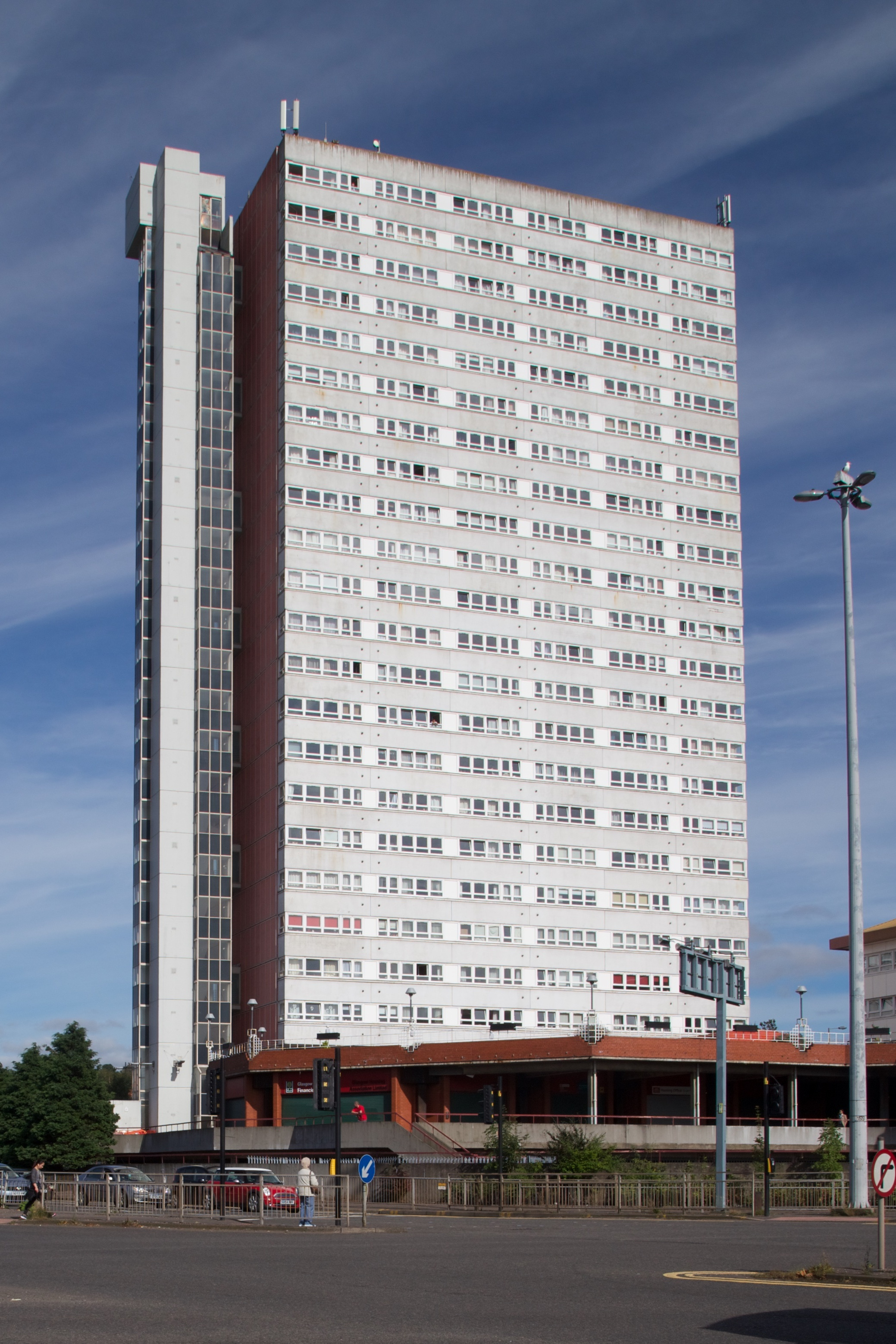
Anniesland Court seen from the south west.

Anniesland Court is a 22-storey residential tower block in the Anniesland area of Glasgow, Scotland, designed by J Holmes & Partners and completed in 1968. It is the tallest listed building in Scotland, and is remarkably similar to Ernő Goldfinger's later and more famous Trellick Tower in London. It is the only tower block in Glasgow to have been granted a category A listing.

== Design and construction ==
Anniesland Court was designed by architecture firm John Holmes and Partner, and was built in the first stage between 1966 and 1968, with additional work on the ground floor from 1984 to 1985. The building was constructed specifically by Glasgow City Council through its municipal direct labour department in the West End area of Glasgow. Until the towers construction, tower blocks in Glasgow had typically been constructed elsewhere in the city, often constructed on vacant land available following the demolition of old tenement housing and factories, particularly in the East End and Southside areas of Glasgow.

Unlike other tower blocks, the tower was not constructed in a "mass production" method which had been adopted in the construction of other tower blocks in Glasgow. Rather, Anniesland Court is constructed using precast concrete panels which are faced in grey and red mosaic, a design element which would make the tower easier to clean and maintain.

The building is unusual in that despite 22 storeys, the lift only has 7 stops. Additionally, the tower contains a separate service tower. The design was meant to echo the structure of a traditional Glasgow Tenement lying on its side. Each of the 7 levels comprises 18 homes – 6 upstairs two-bedroom flats, 6 downstairs two-bedroom flats and 6 single one-room flats with level access off the main corridor. They have full kitchens and bathrooms the same as the two-bed flats. The upstairs and downstairs flats have their two bedrooms facing the rear of the building. On the rear or north facing elevation are the ‘drying’ balconies. These are illuminated at night with blue lights and they can be seen by passengers on their way to land at Glasgow Airport.

== Usage ==
=== Offices ===
Below the ‘tower’ on Crow Road level is the Glasgow City Council’s Financial Services Office and a branch office of the Glasgow Housing Association (GHA) Local Housing Organisation (LHO) Clydeside Tenant Partnership. Below this level is a basement garage underneath the building for residents use. There is also an outside car park to the south.

=== Homes ===
The patio area to the front of the building is 3 levels above Great Western Road. To the east is a smaller building in a similar style, containing 24 homes. On the patio level, there are 8 two-bedroom maisonettes, above which are 16 flats. All have the same configuration as the main building.

Anniesland Court is part of the housing stock transferred to Glasgow Housing Association in 2003. The complex is managed by Great Western Tenant Partnership (GWTP).

Across the entire tower, there are a total of 126 dwellings which all include drying balconies.

=== Other services ===
Anniesland Branch Library and Learning Centre is situated below the tower on ground level. To the north of the library on Crow Road is the Anniesland Court Community Hall, refurbished during 2008, occupied by Anniesland Court Residents Association. The community hall provides a focus for the community and is used daily. It is open for residents to ‘drop in’ for a cup of tea and a chat. It is also the venue for the many evening functions throughout the year.

== Overview ==
The building is lit at night with multicoloured "spider" floodlights to both gables and as above – the balconies. Anniesland Court sits in the Drumchapel/Anniesland Ward (Ward 14) of Glasgow City Council. The local councillors of that ward are presently Councillor Paul Carey, Bailie Patricia Ferguson, Councillor Fyeza Ikhlaq and Bailie Anne McTaggart.

The building is the tallest Listed Building in Scotland, and is also the only tower block in the country to have been awarded Listed Building status. Anniesland Court was designed as a Category A Listed Building by Historic Environment Scotland on 2 April 1996, described as a "landmark for the area" with a "striking composition of banding and lift shaft with generous 2-storey flats".

== See also ==
- Glasgow tower blocks
- List of Category A listed buildings in Glasgow
- List of post-war Category A listed buildings in Scotland
- List of tallest buildings and structures in Glasgow
