= Scotcash =

Scotcash was a not-for-profit, social enterprise and a Community Interest Company (CIC) based in Glasgow, Scotland. It provided basic bank accounts, savings accounts and affordable loans to the underbanked.

== History ==
Scotcash was founded in January 2007, with the help of Glasgow City Council and Glasgow Housing Association. Scotcash provided financial products and services to those who experience difficulties accessing mainstream financial services, such as banks and building societies.

The services offered by Scotcash were credit, basic bank accounts, Credit Union savings accounts, and money advice for customers.

In 2023, Scotcash announced the winding-down of its lending services.

== Awards ==
Scotcash was the overall winner of the Guardian Public Services Awards in 2008.
