= Andrew Haddow =

Scottish footballer

Personal information
- Full name: Andrew Sorbie Haddow
- Date of birth: 8 April 1903
- Place of birth: Cumbernauld, Lanarskhire
- Date of death: 1979 (76)
- Place of death: Camlachie, Glasgow, Scotland
- Position: Centre forward

Senior career*
Years	Team	Apps	(Gls)
	Strathclyde	?	(?)
	Morton	?	(?)
1927–1928	Burnley	1	(0)
	New York Nationals	?	(?)
	Clyde	?	(?)
	Dundee United	?	(?)
	Ballymena United	?	(?)
1932	Étoile Carouge	?	(?)
- * Club domestic league appearances and goals

Andrew Sorbie Haddow (8 April 1903 – 1979) was a Scottish professional footballer who played as an inside forward. He earned a total of 15 goals in his 37 appearances throughout his career.
