= Bluevale and Whitevale Towers =

Coordinates: 55.85595°N 4.21506°W

- 109 Bluevale Street and 51 Whitevale Street
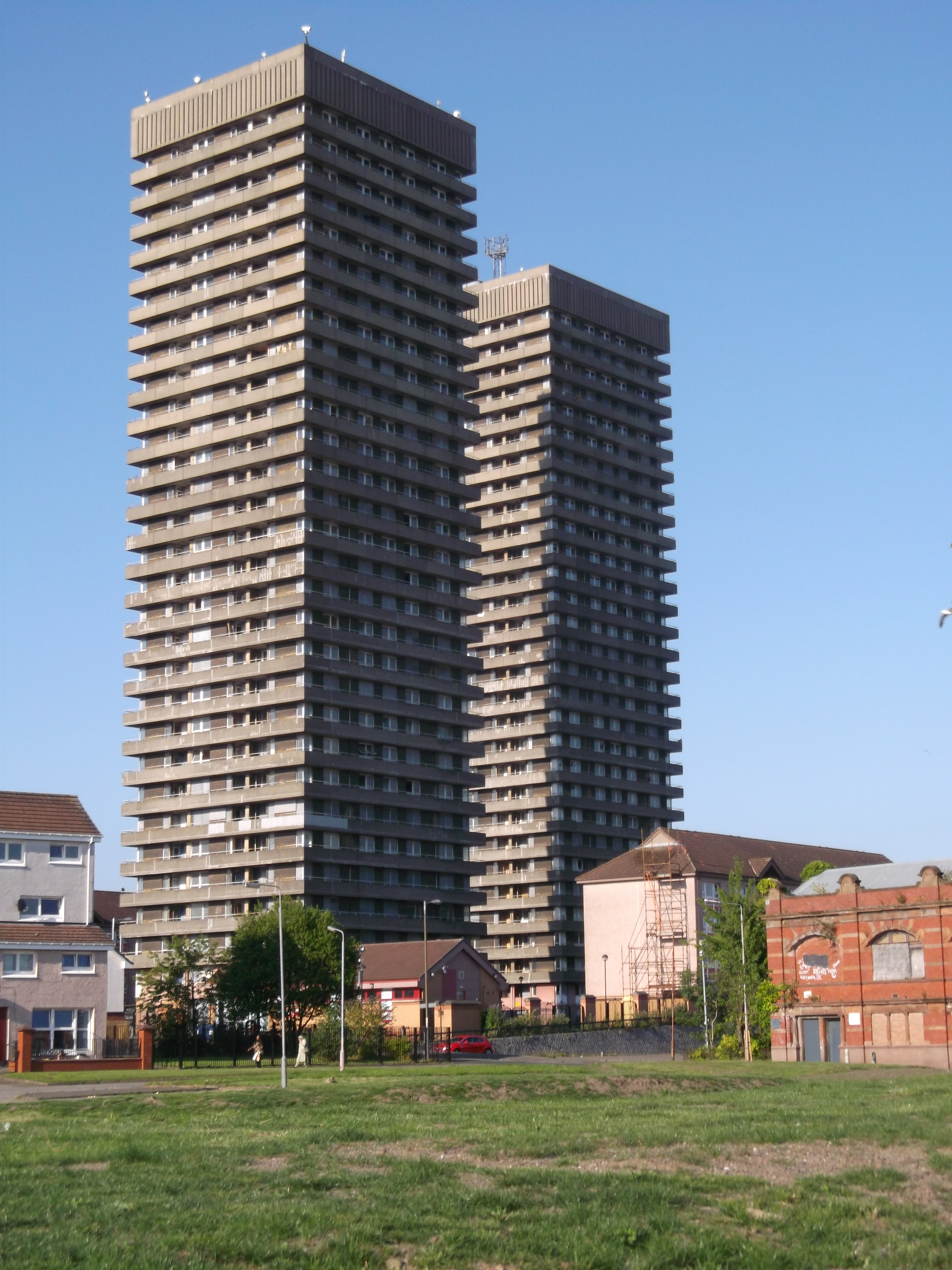
- Whitevale and Bluevale Towers from Gallowgate, 2014
- Alternative names: Bluevale and Whitevale Towers; Gallowgate Twins; Camlachie Twin Towers

Record height
- Tallest in Scotland from 1968 to 2001^{[I]}
- Preceded by: 10 Red Road Court
- Surpassed by: Glasgow Tower

General information
- Status: Demolished
- Type: Residential
- Architectural style: Brutalist
- Location: 109 Bluevale Street and 51 Whitevale Street, Camlachie, Glasgow, Scotland
- Construction started: 1967
- Completed: 1968
- Demolished: 2016

Height
- Roof: 90.8 metres (298 ft)
- Top floor: 30 (29 habitable + 2 mechanical)

Technical details
- Structural system: Pre-cast Concrete
- Floor count: 31
- Lifts/elevators: 2

Design and construction
- Architects: David Harvey Alex Scott & Associates

The Bluevale and Whitevale Towers were twin 31–storey brutalist tower block flats situated in the Camlachie district within the East End of Glasgow, Scotland. Both towers contained 31 floors, and were the second highest public housing schemes in the United Kingdom behind the Barbican Estate in London. Officially named 109 Bluevale Street and 51 Whitevale Street, and often nicknamed the Gallowgate Twins or the Camlachie Twin Towers, the two towers were for a time the tallest buildings in Scotland.

After originally being condemned in 2011, in early 2016 the demolition of both towers was completed.

== History ==
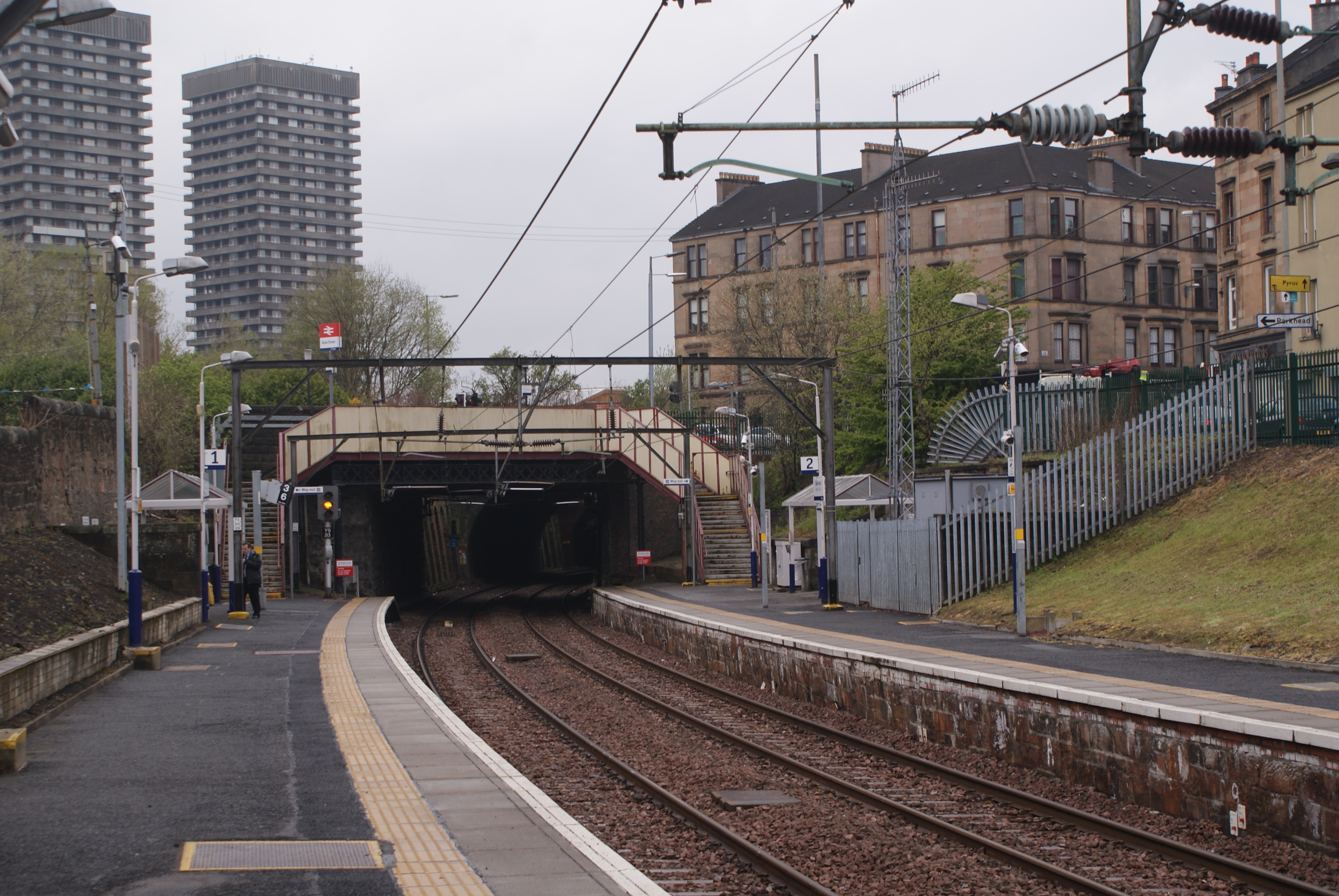
The towers were prominent in the Glasgow city skyline, as seen here from Duke Street railway station.

Faced with crippling housing shortages in the immediate post-war period, the city undertook the building of multi-storey housing in tower blocks in the 1960s and early 1970s on a grand scale, which led to Glasgow becoming the first truly high-rise city in Britain. However, many of these "schemes", as they are known, were poorly planned, or badly designed and cheaply constructed, which led to many of the blocks becoming insanitary magnets for crime and deprivation.

It would not be until 1988 that high rises were built in the city once again, with the construction of the 17-storey Forum Hotel next to the SECC. The 20-storey Hilton Hotel in Anderston followed in 1992. From the early 1990s, Glasgow City Council and its successor, the Glasgow Housing Association, have run a programme of demolishing the worst of the residential tower blocks, including Basil Spence's Gorbals blocks in 1993.

The buildings were unique in their construction – featuring hydraulic jacks in their foundations to combat sway due to their height.

== Accolades ==
At one time the tallest buildings in Scotland, with only 29 occupiable floors (the 30th floor was a mechanical floor for building services and a drying area) the towers were not the buildings with the highest occupied floor level in the city (or Scotland); that distinction belonged to the contemporary Red Road estate on the north side of the city. They were briefly Scotland's second tallest freestanding structure following the demolition of Inverkip Power Station on the Firth of Clyde in 2013.

Standing at 85 metres (279 ft) in height, the Bluevale and Whitevale Towers were Scotland's second tallest residential buildings at the time of the demolition, and were the second tallest public housing towers to have been constructed in the United Kingdom, behind only the Barbican Estate in London.

== Design ==
The design of the Bluevale and Whitevale Towers was based on brutalist architecture, a type of architecture which became popular particularly following World War II. The towers' basic design concept was based on brutal purity to the design, featuring a square plan shape and continuous balconies surrounding each of the towers' four sides. Whilst looking upwards at the buildings, the simple form of the square identical rings stacked one upon the other soaring upwards was described as "a powerful and photogenic form". Both buildings use of harsh unrelenting use of concrete, rigid geometry and uncompromising repetitive forms of construction were said to "demonstrate that the buildings are pure examples of Brutalism".

In total, both towers contained 31 floors including the roof, with 29 floors being inhabitable; one less than the point blocks of the Red Road estate. Both towers combined contained 348 flats, and at their time of opening in 1968, were considered a "modern development among other projects done to purge the blight of the city's slum tenement communities".

== Demolition ==
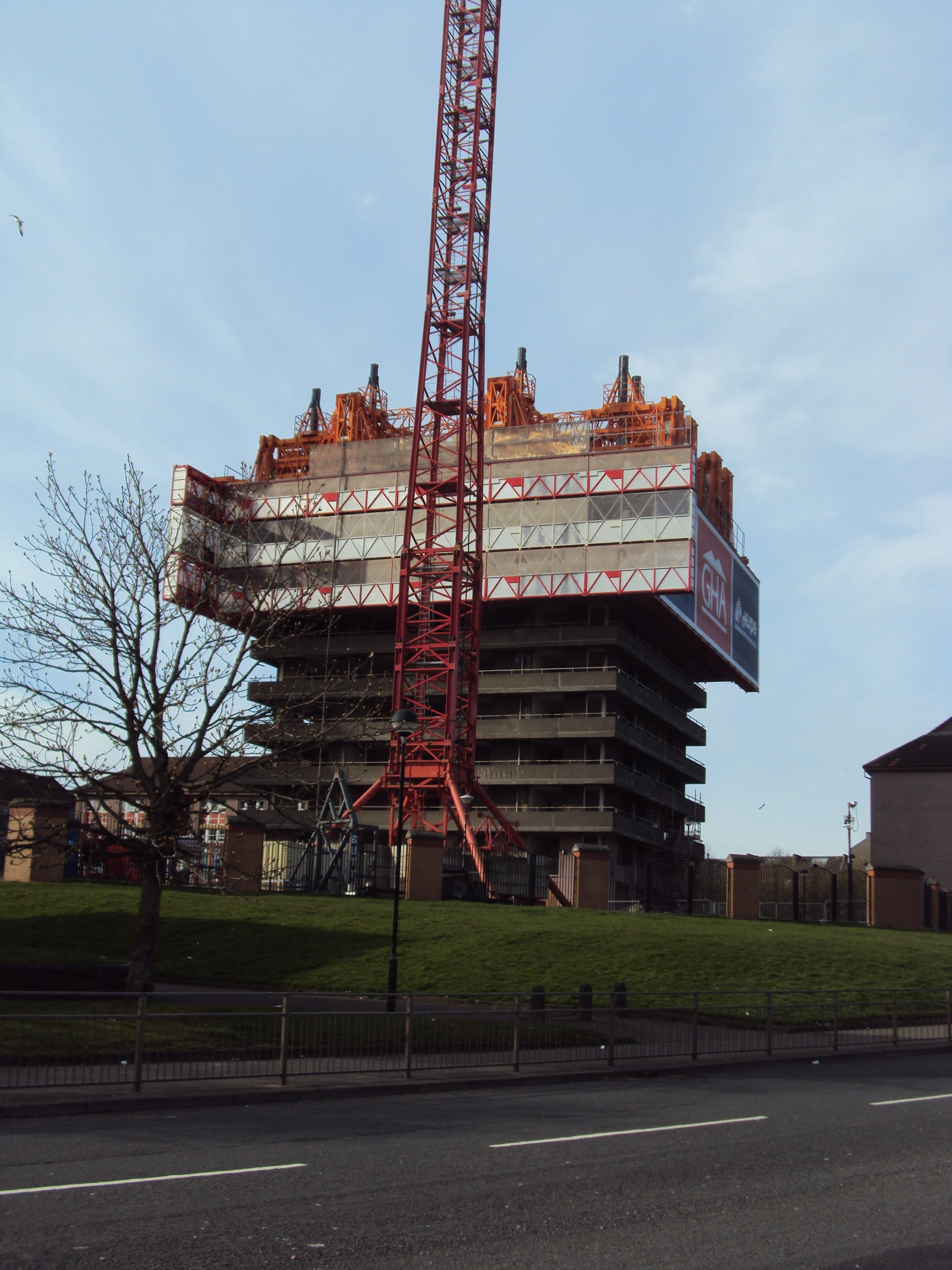
The Bluevale tower during its deconstruction using the top-down method

In November 2011, it was announced by Glasgow Housing Association of the intention to demolish the development, citing the unpopularity of the estate among residents and high maintenance and running costs. The towers gained a later notoriety for being used as a sink estate, with many tenants being recently released convicts and recovering drug addicts.

Demolition of the towers was originally scheduled to take place prior to the 2014 Commonwealth Games, but the complexity of the task pushed the date back to early 2015.

Owing to the buildings' design, and their close proximity to the busy North Clyde Line railway which runs immediately next to the site, a conventional "blowdown" with explosives was deemed impractical. The buildings instead would be disassembled floor by floor using the "top down" method.

The deconstruction process began in January 2015, starting with the Bluevale tower. The neighbouring Whitevale tower was deconstructed in a similar fashion in 2016.

== See also ==
- Glasgow tower blocks
- List of tallest buildings and structures in Glasgow
- List of tallest voluntarily demolished buildings
