= Sam Bunton & Associates =

Scottish architectural firm

Sam Bunton & Associates was a Scottish architectural firm that designed several projects, particularly focusing on post-war reconstruction and housing in Scotland, particularly with the design of the Red Road Flats in Glasgow. In addition to large-scale public housing, the firm also contributed to architectural work related to schools and other community buildings.

== Notable projects ==
Red Road Flats (Glasgow) - This was their most iconic work. The Red Road Flats, completed in the 1960s, were a group of high-rise residential towers intended to address Glasgow's housing crisis. They became an architectural landmark but were eventually demolished due to structural and social challenges

Commissioned in 1962, these high-rise residential buildings were part of Glasgow Corporation's ambitious post-war housing initiatives to alleviate overcrowding. At their completion, the flats were among the tallest residential buildings in Europe and marked the first use of steel-frame construction in Glasgow's housing projects. The two main slab blocks stood at 28 storeys, while the accompanying tower blocks reached 31 storeys in height The Red Road Flats, however, became a symbol of the challenges associated with high-rise public housing. Cost-cutting measures led to issues with design, maintenance, and a lack of amenities. Additionally, the use of asbestos cladding—a common but later dangerous building material—posed significant health risks, leading to renovations and safety concerns over the years Despite initial optimism, the flats quickly suffered from vandalism, crime, and social isolation, causing two blocks to be declared unfit for families by 1980. One was later converted for student accommodation and the YMCA.

By the 1990s and 2000s, the flats housed a diverse community, including refugees from war-torn regions such as Kosovo and asylum seekers from Africa and Asia. Ultimately, the Red Road Flats were demolished in phases between 2012 and 2015, marking the end of their legacy and Glasgow's broader high-rise housing experiment Sam Bunton & Associates’ work on the Red Road Flats is a reflection of both the ambitious ideals and the shortcomings of post-war urban planning in Glasgow.

Clydebank Reconstruction - Following heavy bombing during World War II, Sam Bunton & Associates contributed to Clydebank's redevelopment, focusing on urban planning and housing solutions. This project involved thousands of homes and public buildings

Townend Hospital Alterations (Dumbarton) - In 1947, the firm designed alterations and additions to the Townend Hospital in Dumbarton, including spaces like nurse dormitories and quiet rooms for patients

Faifley Housing Scheme (Clydebank) - The firm helped design several housing projects, including tenement layouts and residential areas like Faifley in Clydebank, where they focused on economic and efficient construction methods

Motherwell Redevelopment Plans - Sam Bunton & Associates prepared redevelopment plans for Merry Street in Motherwell, aiming to provide housing for up to 2,000 people. However, this particular project was never realized
