= Margaret Thomson Davis =

Scottish novelist (1926–2016)

- Born: 24 May 1926; Bathgate, West Lothian, Scotland
- Died: 14 June 2016 (aged 90); Glasgow, Scotland
- Occupation: Novelist
- Notable work: The Breadmakers (1972)

Margaret Thomson Davis (24 May 1926 – 14 June 2016) was a Scottish writer of novels about Glasgow life, beginning with her popular 1972 novel, The Breadmakers.

== Biography ==
Thomson Davis was born in Bathgate, West Lothian, Scotland, and was three years old when her family moved to Balornock, a district in the city of Glasgow. Brought up in the tenements of Springburn, she had an early ambition to be a writer, and after leaving school she worked at various short-term jobs while submitting her stories to magazines. In 1951 she had a short-lived marriage and had a son, and in 1958 she married a second time, moving to Bearsden. She would be in her late forties before she had her first book published.

In 1972, her first novel, The Breadmakers, was published by Allison and Busby, and was described by the Daily Express as a Glaswegian Coronation Street. It was followed in 1973 by A Baby Might Be Crying and A Sort of Peace, forming a trilogy known to as The Breadmakers Saga.

She went on to be the author of more than 20 novels, and The Breadmakers Saga and Rag Woman, Rich Woman (1987) were adapted for the stage. As well as her bestselling family sagas and crime thrillers, she also wrote an autobiography, Write from the Heart (2006).

Thomson Davis was Honorary President of the Strathkelvin Writers' Group.

She died at the age of 90 on 14 June 2016, in Glasgow Royal Infirmary.

== Selected works ==
=== Novels ===
- The Breadmakers (1972)
- A Baby Might Be Crying (1973)
- A Sort of Peace (1973)
- The Prisoner (1974)
- The Prince and the Tobacco Lords (1976)
- Roots of Bondage (1977)
- Scorpion in the Fire (1977)
- The Dark Side of Pleasure (1981)
- A Very Civilised Man (1982)
- Light and Dark (1984)
- Rag Woman, Rich Woman (1987)
- Daughters and Mothers (1988)
- Wounds of War (1989)
- A Woman of Property (1991)
- A Sense of Belonging (1993)
- Hold Me Forever (1994)
- Kiss Me No More (1995)
- A Kind of Immortality (1996)
- Burning Ambition (1997)
- Gallachers (1998)
- The Glasgow Belle (1999)
- A Tangled Web (1999)
- The Clydesiders (1999)
- The Gourlay Girls (2000)
- Clydesiders at War (2001)
- In a Strange Land (2001)
- A Darkening of the Heart (2003)
- The New Breadmakers (2003)
- A Deadly Deception (2005)
- Goodmans of Glassford Street (2007)
- Red Alert (2008)
- Double Danger (2009)
- The Kellys of Kelvingrove (2010)
