= Moorepark, Glasgow =

Area of Glasgow, Scotland

Coordinates: 55.856211°N 4.312232°W

Moorepark
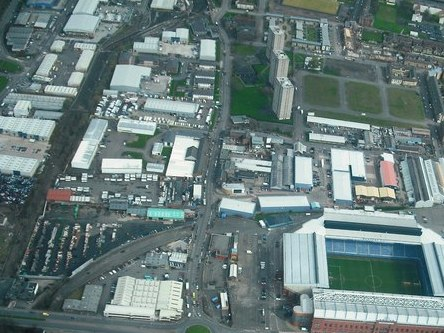
- Aerial view from the south featuring Moorepark (left half of image) in its current industrial form - also showing proximity to Ibrox Stadium

- Location within Glasgow
- OS grid reference: NS552649
- Council area: Glasgow City Council
- Lieutenancy area: Glasgow
- Country: Scotland
- Sovereign state: United Kingdom
- Post town: GLASGOW
- Postcode district: G51 2
- Dialling code: 0141
- Police: Scotland
- Fire: Scottish
- Ambulance: Scottish
- UK Parliament: Glasgow South West
- Scottish Parliament: Glasgow Southside

Moorepark is a small area in the Scottish city of Glasgow. Situated south of the River Clyde and part of the former Burgh of Govan, it was colloquially referred to as 'Wine Alley' during the mid-to-late 20th century when a housing scheme with a rough reputation was sited there. It is now an industrial estate.

== History ==
The area was originally a country estate which contained a mansion house, Moore Park, which was built in the early 19th century for the Hagart family, to plans prepared by the architect David Hamilton. The estate was acquired in the 1870s by the Glasgow and South Western Railway Company and the mansion house was demolished. By the early 20th century Moorepark was bounded by the commercial properties, tenements and villas of the Broomloan estate to the east and railway lines to the west. An isolated island of cheap building land, Glasgow Corporation bought the Moorepark land and in 1934 built the Moorepark Housing Estate, a typical Glasgow rehousing scheme of three-storey grey concrete-block tenements.

A majority of the new residents were from the Gorbals, instead of the Govan area, which had pressing issues with overcrowding and poor quality tenements. These incomers earned the contempt and resentment of some disgruntled local inhabitants, who focused on problems of anti-social behaviour in the estate, which acquired the nickname "Wine Alley". Along with being physically hemmed in by factories and a railway branch line, and issues which were shared by other 'rehousing' developments of the time - namely low-quality building materials, few amenities and socio-economic difficulties associated with the demise of local industries (particularly shipbuilding in the case of Govan) - this label gave Moorepark a stigma as one of the city's most notorious 'schemes'.

Following decades of decline, with existing residents experiencing prejudice and only those with little other choice willing to move to the area, Moorepark was named by The Independent newspaper in April 1994 as one of the worst areas in the United Kingdom, with drug abuse being a widespread problem and unemployment standing at nearly 30% (up to three times the national average at the time). It had also been parodied by the BBC Scotland television comedy series Rab C. Nesbitt, with Wine Alley and the wider Govan area the stated setting for the show, though episodes were seldom filmed there.

Moorepark was demolished and converted into an industrial estate in the 1990s, along with a nearby contemporary development at Teucharhill which had a similar tough reputation.

The area was associated with Junior football team St Anthony's who had two grounds in the area. The first, Moorepark Grounds, was situated to the north of the mansion from the early 1900s and made way for the housing development; the second (New Moore Park, opened in 1929) was to the south-west of the neighbourhood off Edmiston Drive and had fallen into some disrepair before being replaced by a business park at the turn of the 21st century, with the club moving to new facilities at Shieldhall after some years of uncertainty.

The Moorepark area is served by Ibrox subway station on the Glasgow Subway system, which is located on the corner of Copland Road and Woodville Street.

== See also ==
- Housing in Glasgow
