= Barmulloch =

Coordinates: 55.883544°N 4.206162°W

Barmulloch: Scottish Gaelic: Barr a' Mhullaich
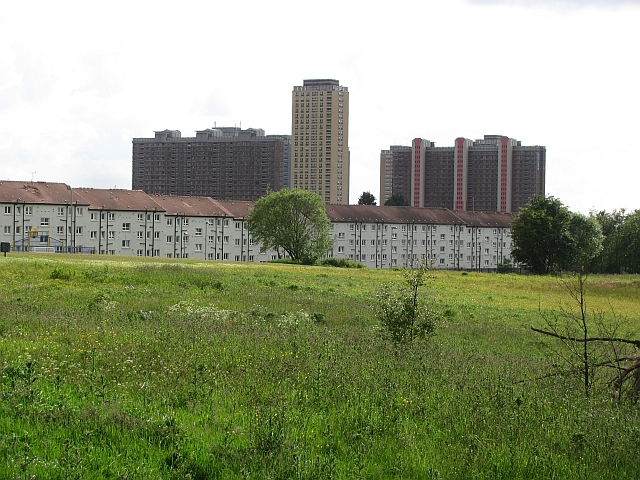
- Quarrywood Road, and the now-demolished Red Road flats

- Location within Glasgow
- OS grid reference: NS621678
- Council area: Glasgow City Council
- Lieutenancy area: Glasgow
- Country: Scotland
- Sovereign state: United Kingdom
- Post town: GLASGOW
- Postcode district: G21
- Dialling code: 0141
- Police: Scotland
- Fire: Scottish
- Ambulance: Scottish
- UK Parliament: Glasgow North East
- Scottish Parliament: Glasgow Provan

Barmulloch (/bɑːrˈmʌləx/; Scottish Gaelic: Barr a' Mhullaich) is a suburban area of the city of Glasgow, Scotland. It is situated north of the River Clyde. Formerly rural, it was developed as a post war overspill housing area, largely featuring prefabricated housing. Barmulloch shared the Red Road complex of multi-storey flats with the neighbouring district of Balornock prior to their demolition.
