= Balornock =

Coordinates: 55.891596°N 4.208218°W

Balornock: Scottish Gaelic: Both Lobharnaig
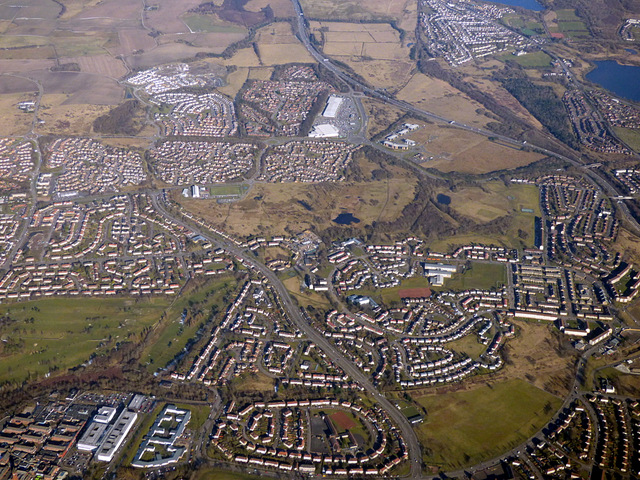
- Aerial view of Bolornock

- Location within Glasgow
- OS grid reference: NS620687
- Council area: Glasgow City Council
- Lieutenancy area: Glasgow
- Country: Scotland
- Sovereign state: United Kingdom
- Post town: GLASGOW
- Postcode district: G21
- Dialling code: 0141
- Police: Scotland
- Fire: Scottish
- Ambulance: Scottish
- UK Parliament: Glasgow North East
- Scottish Parliament: Glasgow Provan

Balornock (/bəˈlɔːrnək/, Scottish Gaelic: Both Lobharnaig) is a district in the city of Glasgow, Scotland. Situated outside the city centre, north of the River Clyde, it forms part of the larger area of Springburn.

Balornock shared the Red Road complex of multi-storey flats with the neighbouring district of Barmulloch; the 21 Birnie Court building (single yellow block) was in Barmulloch. The buildings were formally condemned in July 2008 after a long period of decline, with their phased demolition taking place in three stages between 2012 and 2015.

Local amenities include Stobhill Hospital, The Morven. In 2006 the area was the setting of the film Red Road by Andrea Arnold.

== Noted residents ==
- Margaret Thomson Davis, writer
- Robert Florence, writer and actor
- Tam McManus, footballer
- Courtney Stewart, professional wrestler
