= The Forge Shopping Centre =

Coordinates: 55.85363°N 4.19981°W

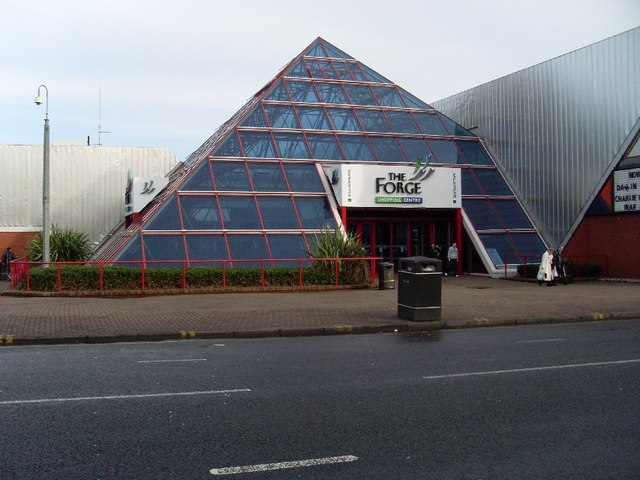
- The centre's Gallowgate entrance
- Location: Parkhead, Glasgow City, Scotland
- Opened: 1988
- Architect: Keppie

The Forge Shopping Centre (or Parkhead Forge) is in the East End of Glasgow, in Parkhead. The shopping centre bore the name from the former William Beardmore and Company steel works site, which had closed in 1983.

== History ==
=== Construction ===
The GEAR (Glasgow Eastern Area Renewal) scheme was founded in 1976, then Europe's largest urban regeneration project of its kind, to provide "core areas with development potential" in the east end of Glasgow. A new shopping centre was part of the plan, ideally to replace the then recently closed Parkhead Forge plant of the Beardmore's steel works. The shopping centre was going to contain a supermarket, a new multiplex cinema and at least 40 units. Work on the shopping centre began in 1986, and the building was opened to the public on 10 October 1988. The main anchor tenant was a Gateway supermarket (at the time the largest in Scotland), but this changed over to Asda early in 1990 and has remained as such ever since.

The main entrances to the centre (on Duke Street and Gallowgate) feature distinctive glass pyramid designs.

=== Extension ===
A second phase of the Forge Shopping Centre in the mid-1990s incorporated a new indoor market and bingo hall to the east of the initial site, and a retail park, operated by a separate company, to the west (the latter being built over part of the historic Camlachie neighbourhood). The retail park was expanded further in the early years of the 21st century to incorporate large branches of B&Q and Tesco.

Recently, the centre was extended to allow space for a new department store. Currently, money is being spent on remodelling the centre and modernising it. A new ceiling and tiles on floor can currently be seen, partly constructed near the Dunnes Stores/Primark exit of the centre.

== Current stores ==
The Forge has a range of shops including two anchor stores: Primark and Asda and a multiplex Cineworld cinema on site. Cineworld closed their location in the shopping centre in 2024 as part of its restructuring . Pure Padel announced in 2025 that they would be opening the first of its kind padel courts in the unit which previously occupied the cinema. McDonald's drive-thru is erected in the vicinity of the car park.
