= Camlachie =

Area of Glasgow, Scotland

Coordinates: 55.8537°N 4.209°W

Camlachie: Scottish Gaelic: Camadh Làthaich
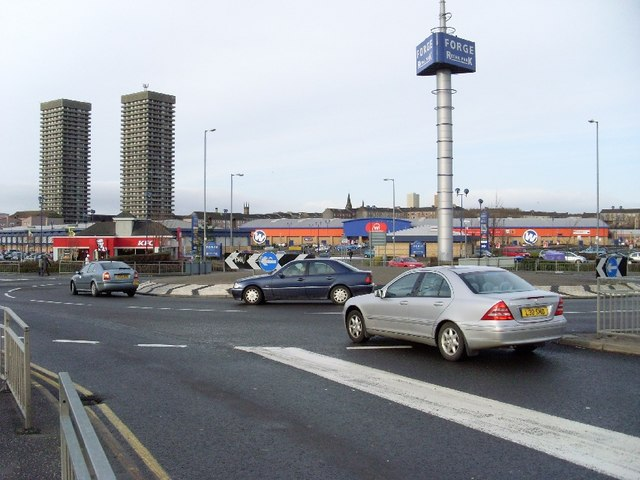
- The Forge Retail Park now occupies much of historic Camlachie. The twin Bluevale and Whitevale Towers in the background were demolished in 2015.

- Location within the Glasgow City council area Location within Scotland
- OS grid reference: NS616646
- Council area: Glasgow City
- Lieutenancy area: Glasgow
- Country: Scotland
- Sovereign state: United Kingdom
- Post town: GLASGOW
- Postcode district: G40
- Dialling code: 0141
- Police: Scotland
- Fire: Scottish
- Ambulance: Scottish
- UK Parliament: Glasgow Central
- Scottish Parliament: Glasgow Shettleston

Camlachie (/ˌkæmˈlæxi/; Scottish Gaelic: Camadh Làthaich) is an area of Glasgow in Scotland, located in the East End of the city, between Dennistoun to the north, and Bridgeton to the south. Formerly a weaving village on the Camlachie Burn, it then developed as an important industrial suburb from the late 19th century, only to almost entirely disappear from the landscape when those industries declined a century later.

It gave its name to the former constituency of the United Kingdom Parliament, Glasgow Camlachie which existed between 1885 and 1955.

In the 21st century, much of the historic Camlachie territory is occupied by the Forge Retail Park (part of The Forge Shopping Centre complex which stretches west from its main site at Parkhead and was built on the site of the William Beardmore and Company steel forge, the area's major employer until its closure in 1983). Other streets which were traditionally part of Camlachie have become more associated with the Barrowfield and Gallowgate neighbourhoods following several redevelopments which caused the loss of most of the older buildings in the area and consequently its integrity as a defined district of the city.

== Notable people ==
- William Nixon, Moderator of the General Assembly of the Free Church of Scotland 1868/69
