= Wheatley Homes Glasgow =

- Established: 2003; 23 years ago
- Type: Housing Association
- Headquarters: Wheatley House, 25 Cochrane Street, Glasgow, G1 1HL
- Location: Glasgow, Scotland
- Owner: Wheatley Group
- Website: wheatleyhomes-glasgow.com
- Formerly called: Glasgow Housing Association

Wheatley Homes Glasgow (formerly Glasgow Housing Association or GHA) is the largest social landlord in Scotland with 40,000 homes across Glasgow. Wheatley Homes Glasgow is a not-for-profit company created in 2003 by the then Scottish Executive for the purpose of owning and managing Glasgow's social housing stock.

Wheatley Homes Glasgow, then "GHA" took over ownership of Glasgow City Council’s housing stock after a ballot of tenants.

Since initial stock transfer, Wheatley Homes Glasgow has invested £1.5 billion modernising tenants’ homes with new kitchens and bathrooms, Secured by Design doors and windows, new roofs, overcladding and new central heating.

Wheatley Homes Glasgow has also built more than 2000 new affordable homes across the city. The demolition of high rise flats across the city has been a strategic priority, though replacement homes have not been forthcoming, leading to a reduction in the overall housing stock. At Red Road, 1326 flats were demolished. No direct replacement homes have been built on the site. 2280 flats ceased to exist after the demolition of the Sighthill tower blocks. Just 141 replacement homes have been built.

Wheatley Homes Glasgow is part of Wheatley Group - Scotland’s leading housing, care and property management group - which provides homes and services to over 200,000 people in 17 local authority areas across Central Scotland.

The social landlord works with partners, including Glasgow City Council, the Scottish Government, Police Scotland, Scottish Fire and Rescue Service and NHS Scotland, to deliver projects to make communities cleaner, greener and safer.

The Board oversees the delivery of GHA’s strategic priorities and the delivery of services to customers. It's made up of six tenants, an independent member, two Wheatley Group nominees and two Glasgow City Council elected members.

Wheatley Homes Glasgow has a network of local offices and local tenant-led committees. It also has three Area Committees: North West, North East and South which give tenants and factored homeowners more local control. These committees are made up of tenants and other community representatives and make decisions for their areas.

In 2010/2011, the company carried out a restructure, moving more staff to the frontline. More services were moved to local offices including welfare benefits, fuel advice and furnished lets.

On 1 April 2022, GHA was renamed "Wheatley Homes Glasgow", following GHA and Cube Housing Association, both part of Wheatley Group, merging in 2021.

== Second Stage Transfer ==
Thousands of tenants were given a vote on whether they wanted their homes to transfer from Wheatley Homes Glasgow to community ownership under a process known as Second Stage Transfer.

Almost 19000 homes were transferred to community-based housing associations and co-operatives.
