= Lanarkshire =

Coordinates: 55°35′N 3°50′W

- Historic county
- Lanarkshire shown within Scotland
- Interactive map of Lanarkshire
- Sovereign state: United Kingdom
- Country: Scotland
- County town: Lanark (historic); Glasgow (1890–1964); Hamilton (1964–1975)

Area
  - Total: 879 sq mi (2,277 km^{2})
- Ranked 11th of 34
- Chapman code: LKS

Lanarkshire, also called the County of Lanark (Scottish Gaelic: Siorrachd Lannraig; Scots: Lanrikshire), is a historic county, lieutenancy area and registration county in the Central Lowlands and Southern Uplands of Scotland. The county is no longer used for local government purposes, but gives its name to the two modern council areas of North Lanarkshire and South Lanarkshire.

The county was established as a shire (the area controlled by a sheriff) in the twelfth century, covering most of the basin of the River Clyde. The area was sometimes known as Clydesdale. In the early fifteenth century the western part of the shire was removed to become Renfrewshire. The historic county of Lanarkshire includes Glasgow, but the city had a separate lieutenancy from 1893. A Lanarkshire County Council existed from 1890 until 1975, which was based in Glasgow until 1964 when it moved to Hamilton.

Lanarkshire is generally bounded to the north by Dunbartonshire and Stirlingshire, to the north-east by West Lothian and Midlothian, to the east by Peeblesshire, to the south by Dumfriesshire, and to the west by Ayrshire and Renfrewshire (historic). The county is more rural in the south where it extends into the hills of the Southern Uplands, and more built-up in the north where it includes much of the Greater Glasgow conurbation, Scotland's largest urban area.

== History ==
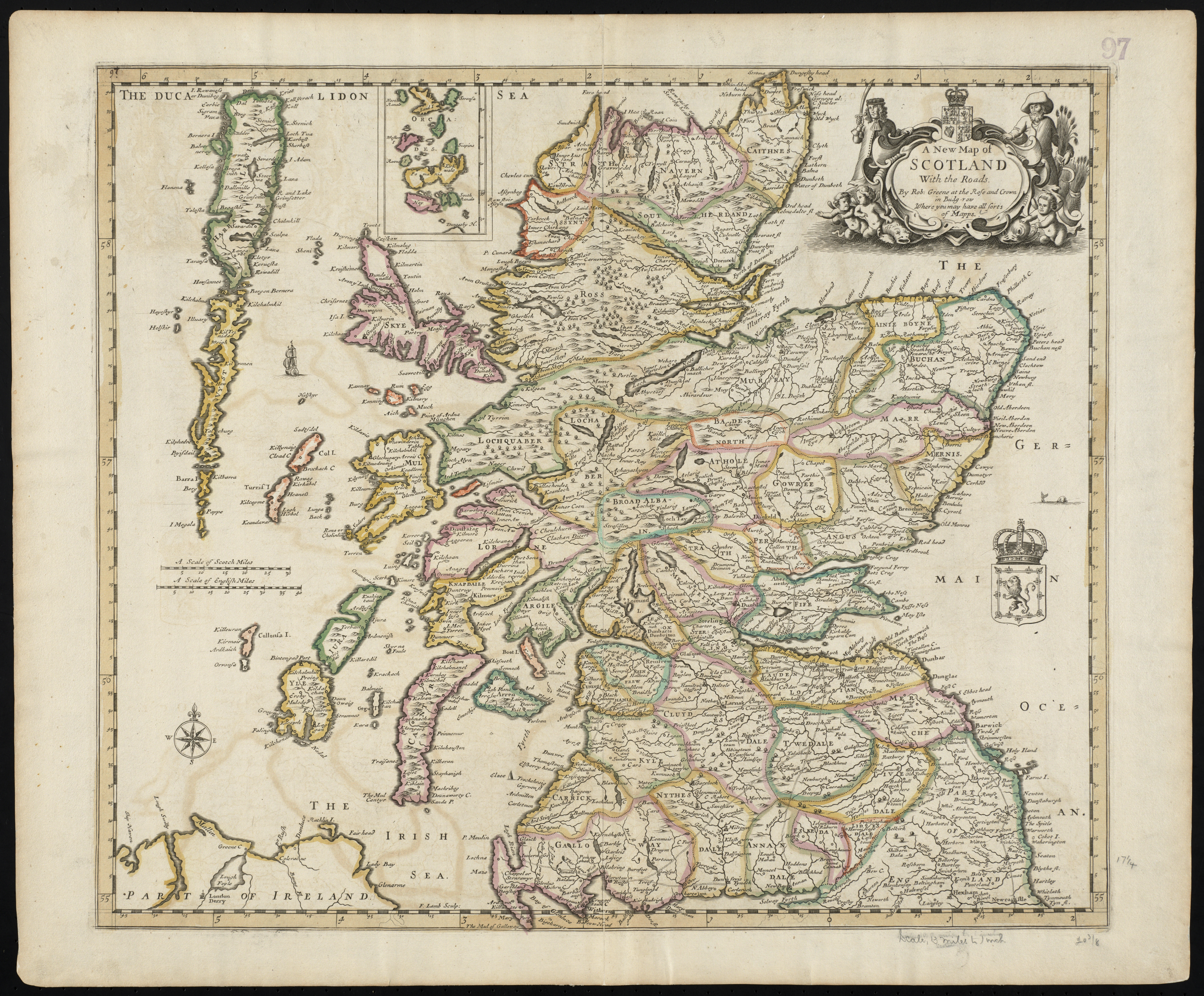
Map of Scottish provinces in 1689, with Lanarkshire labelled as "Clydesdale".

It is not known exactly when the shire of Lanark was created; it seems likely that it was created by David I (reigned 1124–1153) who was generally responsible for introducing shires as part of his introduction of Anglo-Norman style administration to Scotland. However, the first documented reference to Lanarkshire dates from the reign of David's successor, Malcolm IV (reigned 1153–1165).

Lanarkshire covered much of the basin of the River Clyde, and took its name from the town of Lanark, which is near the geographic centre of the county and served as the first county town. When first created the shire included on its western side an area south of the Clyde stretching out to the Firth of Clyde. This western area was made the separate county of Renfrewshire in the early fifteenth century. The remainder of Lanarkshire was then divided into two wards, each with their own sheriff-substitute: Over Ward was administered from Lanark, and Nether Ward was administered from Rutherglen and Hamilton at different times. In the mid-eighteenth century the two wards were replaced with three wards: Upper Ward based in Lanark, Middle Ward based in Hamilton, and Lower Ward based in Glasgow.

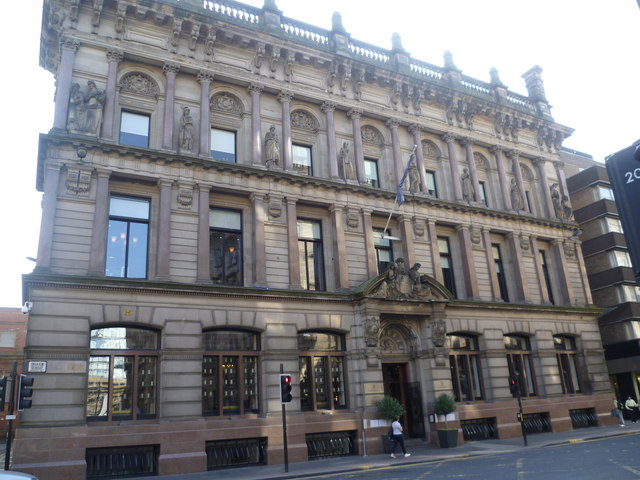
The former headquarters of Lanark County Council at Lanarkshire House in Glasgow

Elected county councils were created in 1890 under the Local Government (Scotland) Act 1889. Lanarkshire County Council covered the combined area of the three wards, but excluding the three burghs of Airdrie, Glasgow and Hamilton, which were deemed capable of running their own affairs. Glasgow was subsequently made a county of itself in 1893, also removing the city from the rest of Lanarkshire for judicial and lieutenancy purposes. Reforms to county council powers in 1930 saw Airdrie and Hamilton brought within the administrative area of the county council.

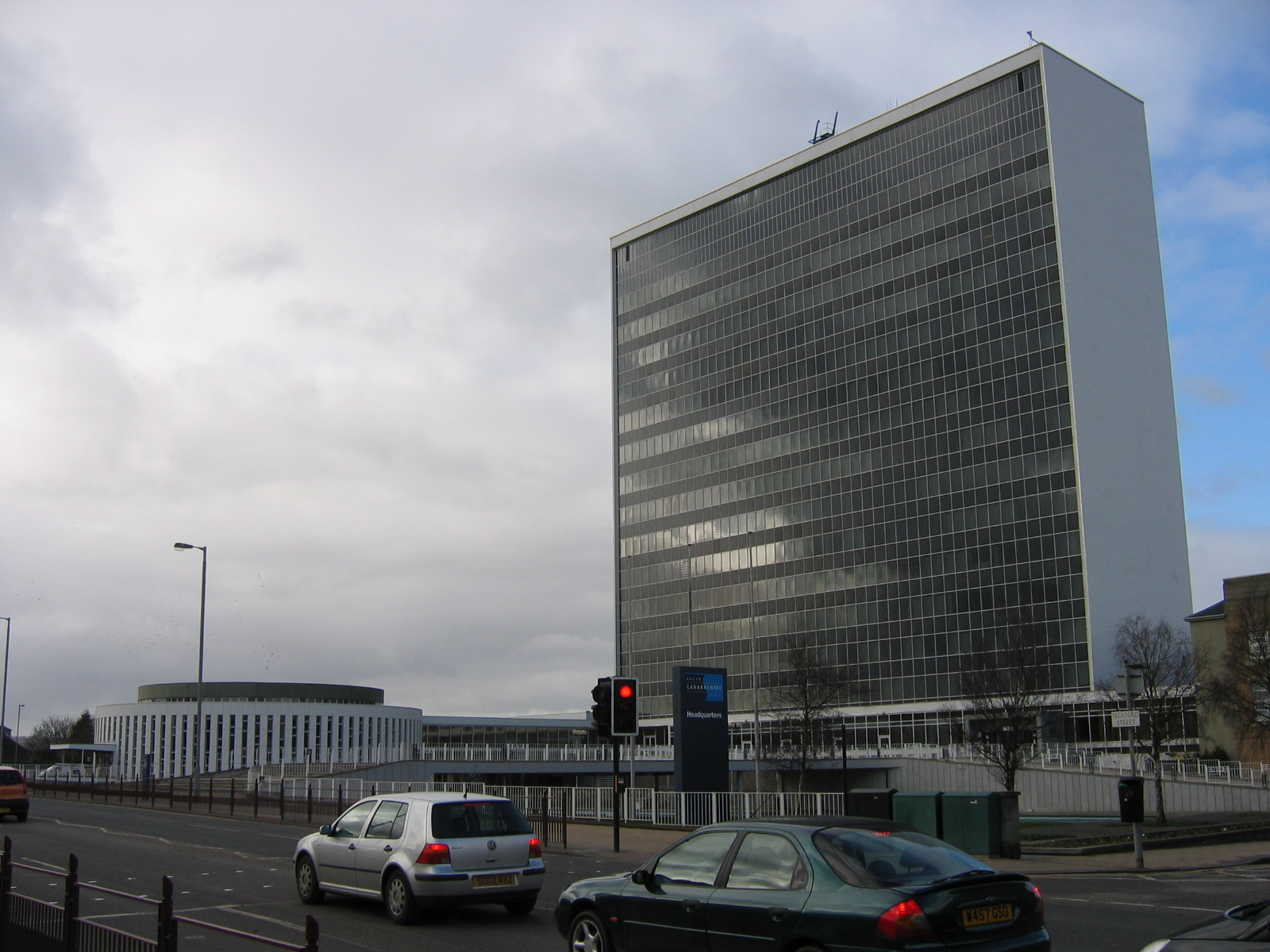
County Buildings, Hamilton: County Council's headquarters after 1964.

Lanarkshire County Council was initially based at County Buildings in Wilson Street in Glasgow; whilst the city was outside the area controlled by the county council, it was found to be the most accessible meeting place for the councillors. From 1930 the county council was based at Lanarkshire House in Ingram Street in Glasgow. Lanark County Council relocated to Lanark County Buildings in Hamilton in 1964.

In 1975, the county council was abolished under the Local Government (Scotland) Act 1973, which established a new system of upper-tier regions and lower-tier districts. Lanarkshire was included within the Strathclyde region, and the county council's former area was divided between seven districts:

- Clydesdale (called Lanark District until 1980)
- East Kilbride
- Glasgow
- Hamilton
- Monklands
- Motherwell
- Strathkelvin

For lieutenancy purposes, the last Lord Lieutenant of Lanarkshire was made lord-lieutenant for the combined area of the Clydesdale, East Kilbride, Hamilton, Monklands, and Motherwell districts when the reforms came into effect in 1975.

Further reforms in 1996 under the Local Government etc. (Scotland) Act 1994 saw the regions and districts abolished and replaced by all-purpose unitary council areas. Since then Lanarkshire has straddled the modern council areas of:

- East Dunbartonshire
- Glasgow
- North Lanarkshire
- South Lanarkshire

The Lanarkshire lieutenancy area was redefined at the same time to cover all of South Lanarkshire and most of North Lanarkshire, but excluding the area around Cumbernauld and Kilsyth, with the excluded area roughly corresponding to the parts of North Lanarkshire which had been in Dunbartonshire and Stirlingshire prior to 1975.

North Lanarkshire and South Lanarkshire have a joint board for valuation and electoral registration. There is also a joint health board, which does not cover Rutherglen and the surrounding area in South Lanarkshire. The boundaries of the historic county of Lanarkshire, excluding the city of Glasgow, are still used for some limited official purposes connected with land registration, being a registration county.

== Coat of arms ==
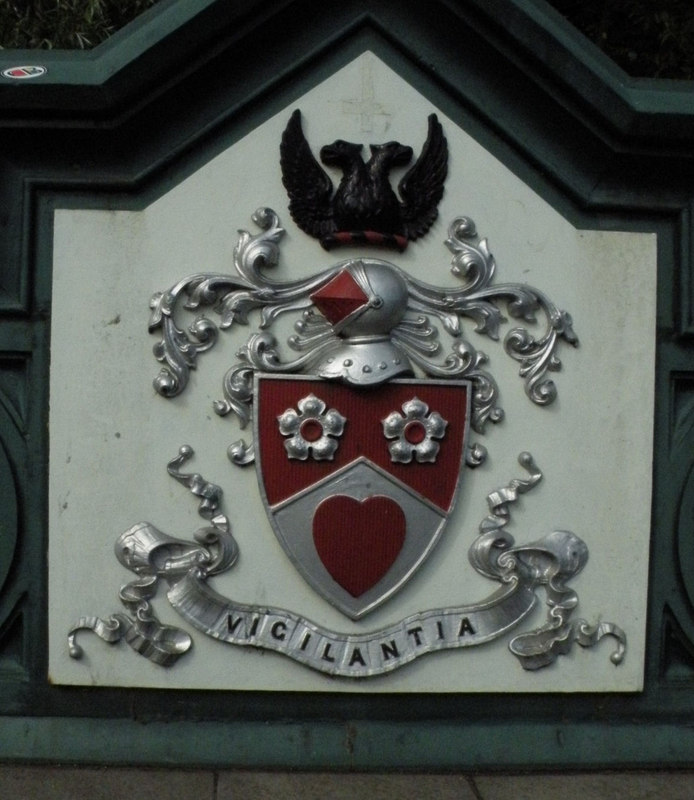
Lanarkshire's arms, as seen on the Great Western Bridge in Glasgow

Lanarkshire was granted a coat of arms by the Lord Lyon on 24 December 1886. The arms is: Party per chevron gules and argent, two cinquefoils pierced in chief ermine, and in base a man's heart counter-changed. The cinquefoils come from the arms of the Clan Hamilton, and the heart from the arms of the Clan Douglas, the two main local families. The crest is a demi-eagle displayed with two heads, sable beaked gules. The motto is VIGILANTIA.

== Geography ==
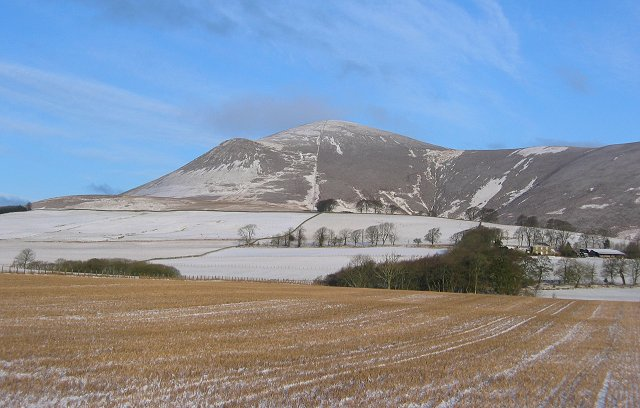
Tinto hill near Symington

Lanarkshire occupies the valley of the river Clyde, which crosses the county from the north-west to south-east. It is predominantly flat and agricultural, rising to the south with the Lowther Hills of the Southern Uplands, with Culter Fell on the border with Peeblesshire being the highest point at 748 m (2,454 ft). In the east a small portion of the Pentland Hills lie in the county, in the vicinity of Tarbrax and Dunsyre. In the far south lies the Daer Reservoir. Northern Lanarkshire is dominated by the Glasgow conurbation, Scotland's largest city, though some small bodies of water can be found such as the Roughrigg Reservoir, Lilly Loch, Hillend Reservoir, Forrestburn Reservoir and Black Loch. Other significant settlements include Coatbridge, East Kilbride, Motherwell, Airdrie, Blantyre, Cambuslang, Rutherglen, Wishaw, Bellshill, Strathaven and Carluke.

=== Rivers ===
- North Medwin River
- South Medwin River
- River Clyde
- River Avon
- South Calder Water

== Mining industry ==
From the mid-eighteenth century to the early twentieth century Lanarkshire profited from its rich seams of coal in places such as Glenboig. As the coal industry developed around Glasgow in the 1700s the price of coal to the city rose under the control of a cartel of coal owners. The solution was to carve out a canal to take advantage of the good (and uncontrolled) coal deposits of the Monklands area. By 1793, the Monklands canal was completed and the Lanarkshire coal industry thrived. The resulting boom lasted for over 100 years but reached its peak by the second decade of the twentieth century and even two world wars failed to halt the contraction. Output in the county continued to fall and the National Coal Board concentrated investment in Ayrshire, Fife and the Lothians. By 1970 there were only four collieries left in Lanarkshire and the closure of Cardowan in 1983 brought the long decline to an end.

== Transport ==
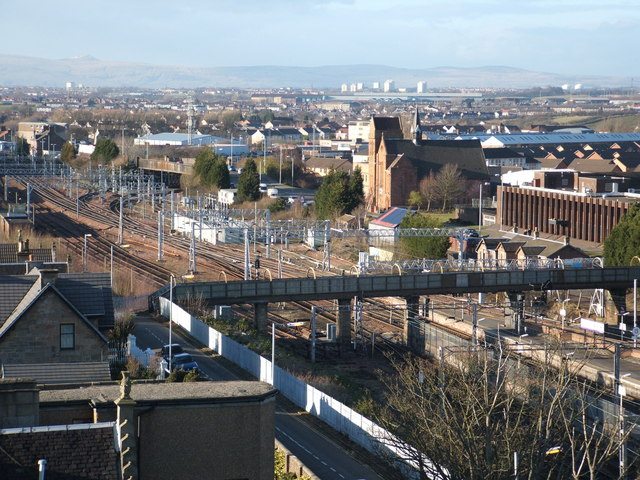
The West Coast Mainline running through Motherwell

The M74 motorway links Glasgow with Carlisle and points further south, with the M8 linking the city to Edinburgh. Glasgow and the surrounding areas are well served by numerous roads and train lines. The West Coast Main Line cuts north–south across the county and connects Glasgow with Manchester, Birmingham and London. Glasgow is also served by the Glasgow Subway.

== Events ==
Lanarkshire hosted the International Children's Games in August 2011. A total of 1,300 competitors and coaches, along with administrators and delegates, representing 77 cities from 33 countries worldwide attended.

== Civil parishes ==
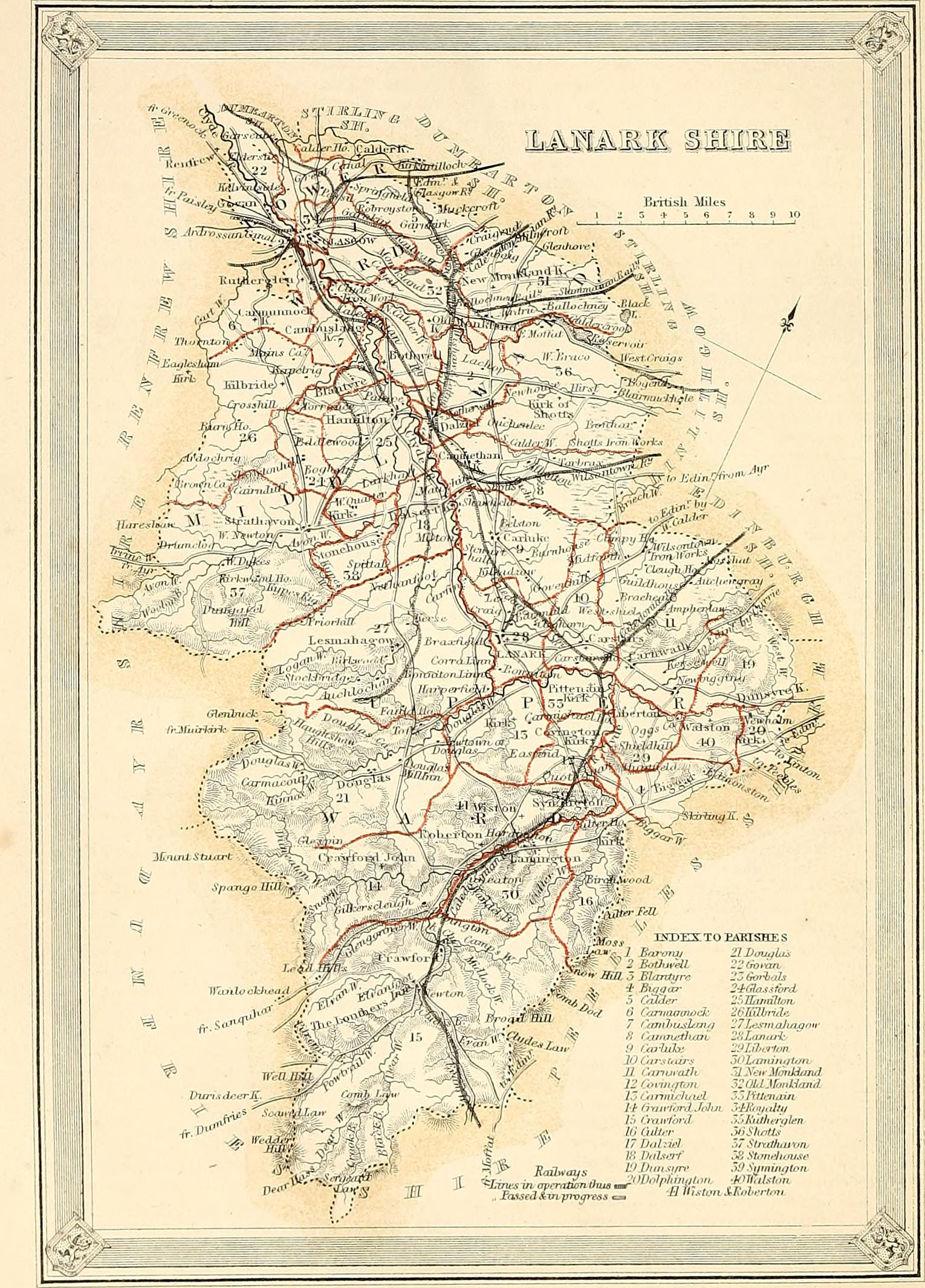
Map of Lanarkshire in the Imperial Gazetteer of Scotland, 1868

- Barony (Glasgow)
- Bothwell
- Blantyre
- Biggar
- Cadder
- Carmunnock
- Cambusnethan
- Carluke
- Carstairs
- Carnwath
- Covington
- Carmichael
- Crawfordjohn
- Crawford
- Coulter
- Dalziel
- Dalserf
- Dunsyre
- Dolphinton
- Douglas
- Govan
- Gorbals
- Glasgow
- Hamilton
- East Kilbride
- Lesmahagow
- Lanark
- Libberton
- Lamington
- New Monkland, Airdrie
- Old Monkland
- Pettinain
- Royalty
- Rutherglen
- Shotts
- Strathaven
- Stonehouse
- Symington
- Wilston
- Wiston and Roberton

== Settlements ==
- Abington
- Airdrie
- Allanton
- Anderston
- Annathill
- Ashgill
- Auchengray
- Auchenheath
- Auchenshuggle
- Auldhouse
- Baillieston
- Balornock
- Bargeddie
- Barlanark
- Barmulloch
- Bellahouston
- Bellshill
- Biggar
- Birkenshaw
- Birniehill
- Bishopbriggs
- Blackhill
- Blackwood
- Blantyre
- Blythswood Hill
- Bogside
- Bonkle
- Bothwell
- Braehead
- Braidfauld
- Braidwood
- Bridgeton
- Broomhill
- Broomhouse
- Budhill
- Burnbank
- Burnside
- Busby
- Cadder
- Calderbank
- Caldercruix
- Caldermill
- Calderwood
- Calton
- Cambuslang
- Camlachie
- Carnwath
- Cardowan
- Carfin
- Carluke
- Carmichael
- Carmunnock
- Carmyle
- Carnbroe
- Carntyne
- Carstairs
- Carstairs Junction
- Cartland
- Castlemilk
- Cessnock
- Chapelhall
- Chapelton
- Chryston
- Cleghorn
- Cleland
- Coalburn
- Coatbridge
- College Milton
- Colston
- Coulter
- Cowcaddens
- Cowlairs
- Craigend
- Craigton
- Cranhill
- Crawford
- Crawfordjohn
- Croftfoot
- Crossford
- Crutherland
- Dalmarnock
- Dalserf
- Dennistoun
- Dolphinton,
- Douglas
- Dowanhill
- Drumoyne
- Drumsagard
- Dumbreck
- Dunsyre
- East Crindledyke
- Eastfield
- East Kilbride
- East Mains
- Easterhouse
- Easthall
- Elsrickle
- Fernhill
- Ferniegair
- Finnieston
- Forrestfield
- Forth
- Gallowgate
- Gardenhall
- Garnethill
- Garnkirk
- Garrion Bridge
- Garrowhill
- Gartcosh
- Gartloch
- Garthamlock
- Germiston
- Gilshochill
- Glasgow
- Glasgow Harbour
- Glassford
- Glenboig
- Glenmavis
- Glespin
- Gorbals
- Govan
- Govanhill
- Greenfield
- Greengairs
- Greenhills
- Haghill
- Hairmyres
- Halfwayhouse
- Hamilton
- Hamiltonhill
- Harthope
- Harthill
- Hartwood
- Hillhead
- Hillhouse
- Hogganfield
- Holytown
- Hutchesontown
- Hyndland
- Ibrox
- Jackton
- Kelvin
- Kelvinbridge
- Kelvindale
- Kelvinside
- Kilncadzow
- King's Park
- Kinning Park
- Kingston
- Kirkfieldbank
- Kirkhill
- Kirkmuirhill
- Lambhill
- Lamington
- Lanark
- Larkhall
- Laurieston
- Law
- Leadhills
- Lesmahagow
- Lightburn
- Lilybank
- Lindsayfield
- Linthouse
- Longriggend
- Luggiebank
- Maryhill
- Maryhill Park
- Millerston
- Milton
- Mollinsburn
- Morningside
- Moodiesburn
- Mossend
- Mossneuk
- Motherwell
- Mount Vernon
- Muirhead
- The Murray
- Nemphlar
- Nerston
- Netherburn
- New Lanark
- New Stevenston
- Newarthill
- Newbank
- Newbigging
- Newhouse
- Newlandsmuir
- Newmains
- Newton
- North Kelvinside
- Oatlands
- Overtown
- Park District
- Parkhead
- Parkhouse
- Partick
- Partickhill
- Peel Park
- Pettinain
- Philipshill
- Plains
- Plantation
- Port Dundas
- Possilpark
- Provanhall
- Provanmill
- Quarter
- Queenslie
- Quothquan
- Ravenscraig
- Ravenstruther
- Riddrie
- Rigside
- Robertson
- Robroyston
- Rosebank
- Royston
- Ruchazie
- Ruchill
- Rutherglen
- St Leonards
- Salsburgh
- Sandford
- Sandyhills
- Shettleston
- Shieldhall
- Shotts
- Sighthill
- South Busby
- Springboig
- Springburn
- Springhill
- Stand
- Stepps
- Stewartfield
- Stonehouse
- Strathaven
- Summerston
- Swinton
- Symington
- Tannochside
- Tarbrax
- Thankerton
- Thorntonhall
- Thornwood
- Tillietudlem
- Tollcross
- Toryglen
- Townhead
- Tradeston
- Uddingston
- Viewpark
- The Village
- Wattston
- Wellhouse
- Westburn
- West Mains
- Westwood
- Westwoodhill
- Whitehills
- Whiteinch
- Whitlawburn
- Wilsontown
- Wishaw
- Wiston
- Woodlands
- Woolfords
- Yieldshields
- Yorkhill

== Gallery ==
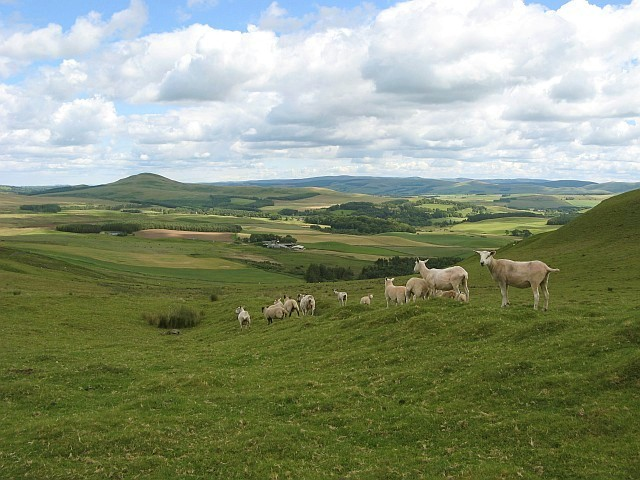
Rolling Lanarkshire countryside near Dunsyre

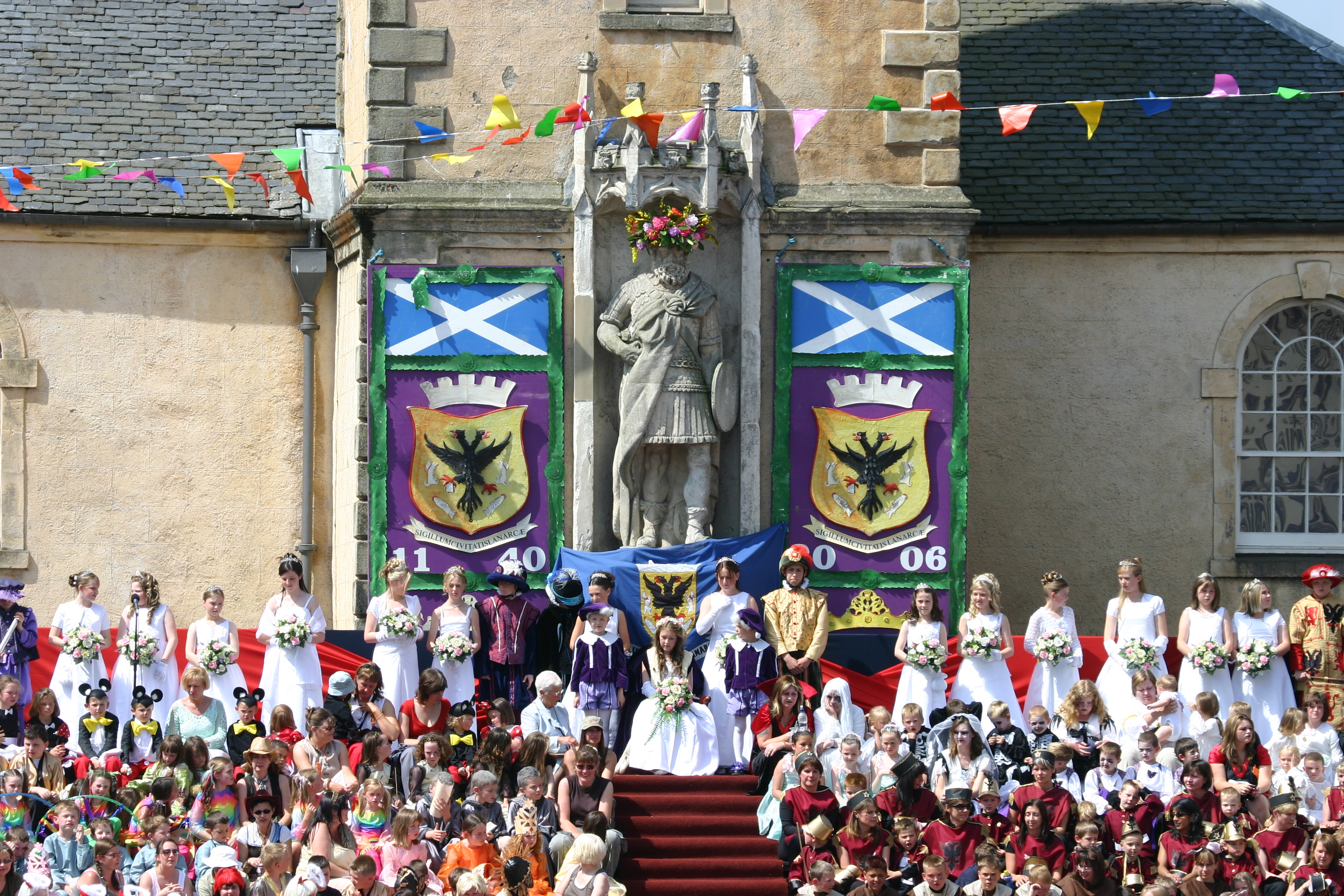
Lanark Lanimers in Lanark

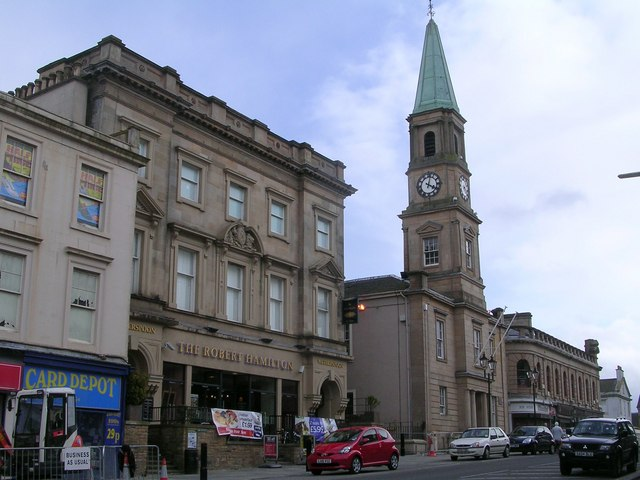
Airdrie

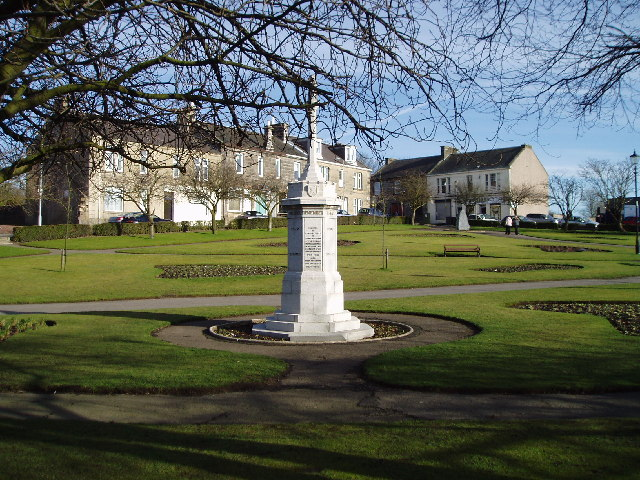
Carluke

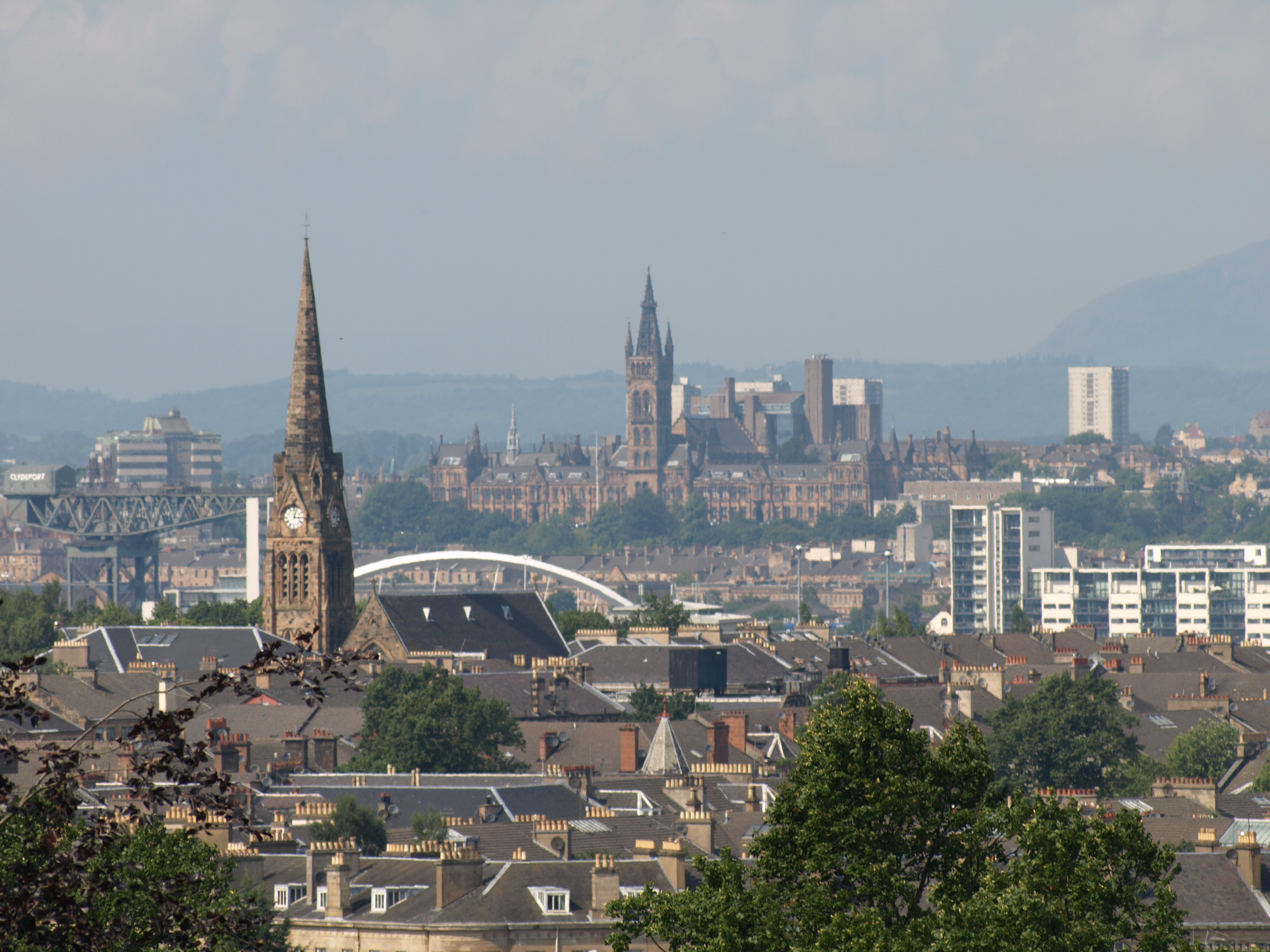
Glasgow

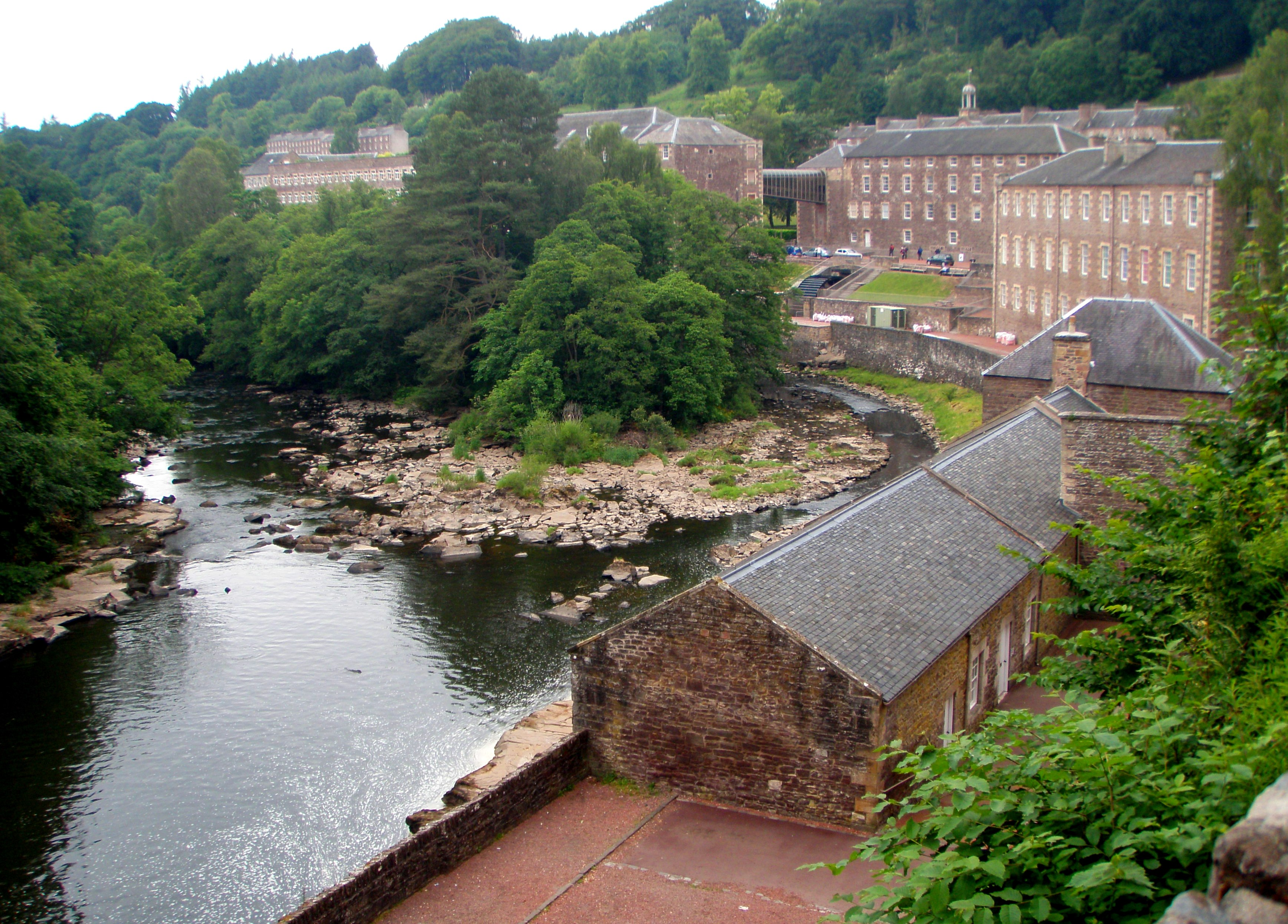
New Lanark

== Maps ==
Digitised historic and modern maps of Lanarkshire are available from National Library of Scotland including:

- Glasgow and the county of Lanark manuscript map drawn by Scottish cartographer Timothy Pont sometime between 1583 and 1596
- The nether ward of Clyds-dail and Glasco from the Blaeu Atlas of Scotland by Dutch cartographer Joan Blaeu published in 1654
- A map of the west of Scotland containing Clydsdail, Nithsdail, Ranfrew, Shyre of Ayre, & Galloway manuscript map drawn by the Scottish surveyor and map maker John Adair in about 1685
- Map of the town of Glasgow & country seven miles around by Scottish cartographer Thomas Richardson published in 1795
- Ainslie's Map of the Southern Part of Scotland by Scottish cartographer John Ainslie published in 1821
- North and south of Lanarkshire from John Thomson's Atlas of Scotland published in 1832
