= Libberton =

Village and historical parish in South Lanarkshire

Coordinates: 55.66969°N 3.60769°W

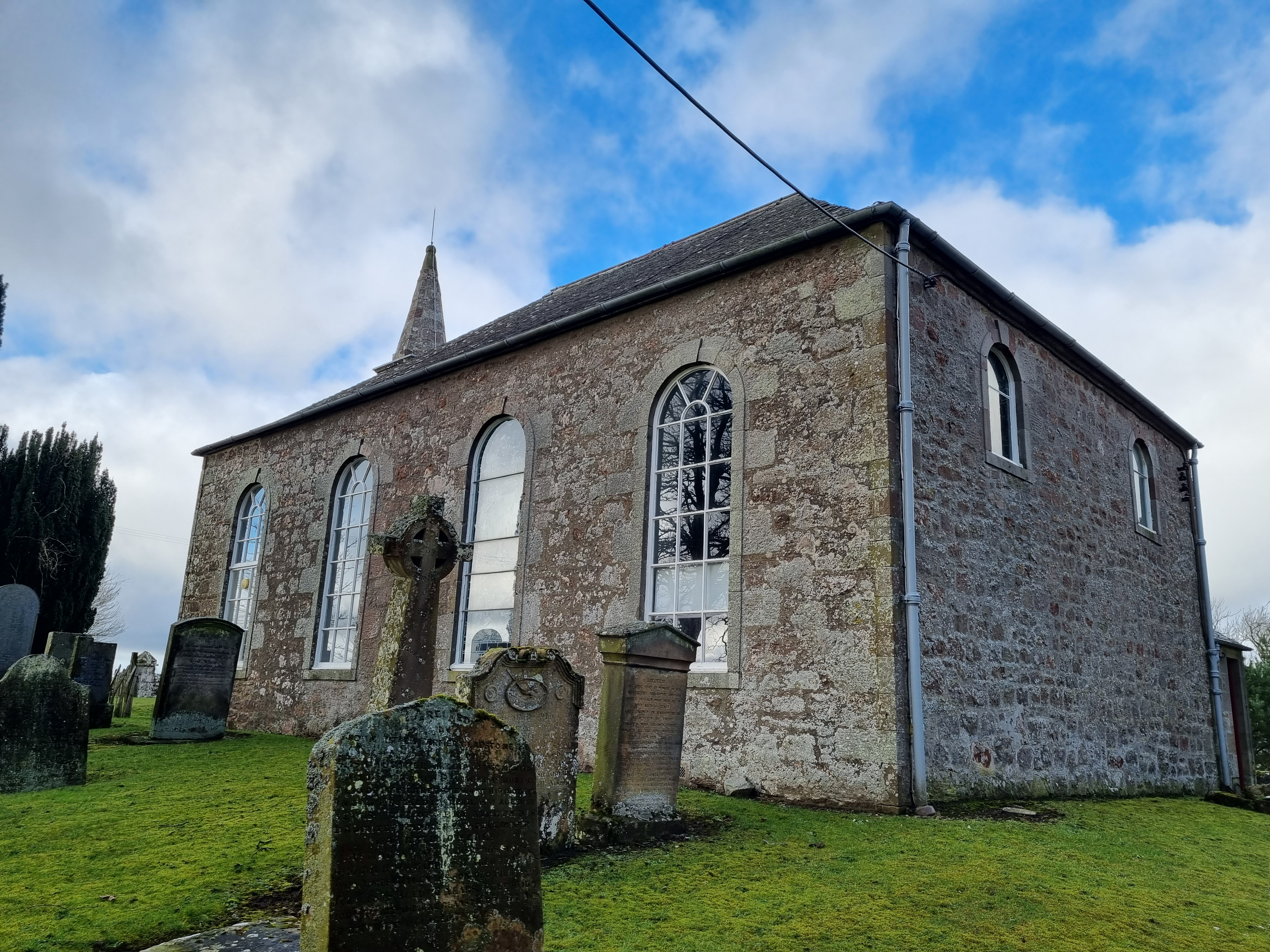
- Libberton Parish Church, seen from the south-east, built 1812

- Location within South Lanarkshire
- Civil parish: Libberton
- Council area: South Lanarkshire
- Country: Scotland
- Sovereign state: United Kingdom
- Police: Scotland
- Fire: Scottish
- Ambulance: Scottish

Libberton is a village and historical parish in South Lanarkshire. The village is approximately 2 miles (3.2 km) north of Quothquan and 2.3 miles (3.68 km) south-east of Carnwath. The nearest rivers are the South Medwyn River, the North Medwyn River and the River Clyde which lies the east of the village.

== History ==
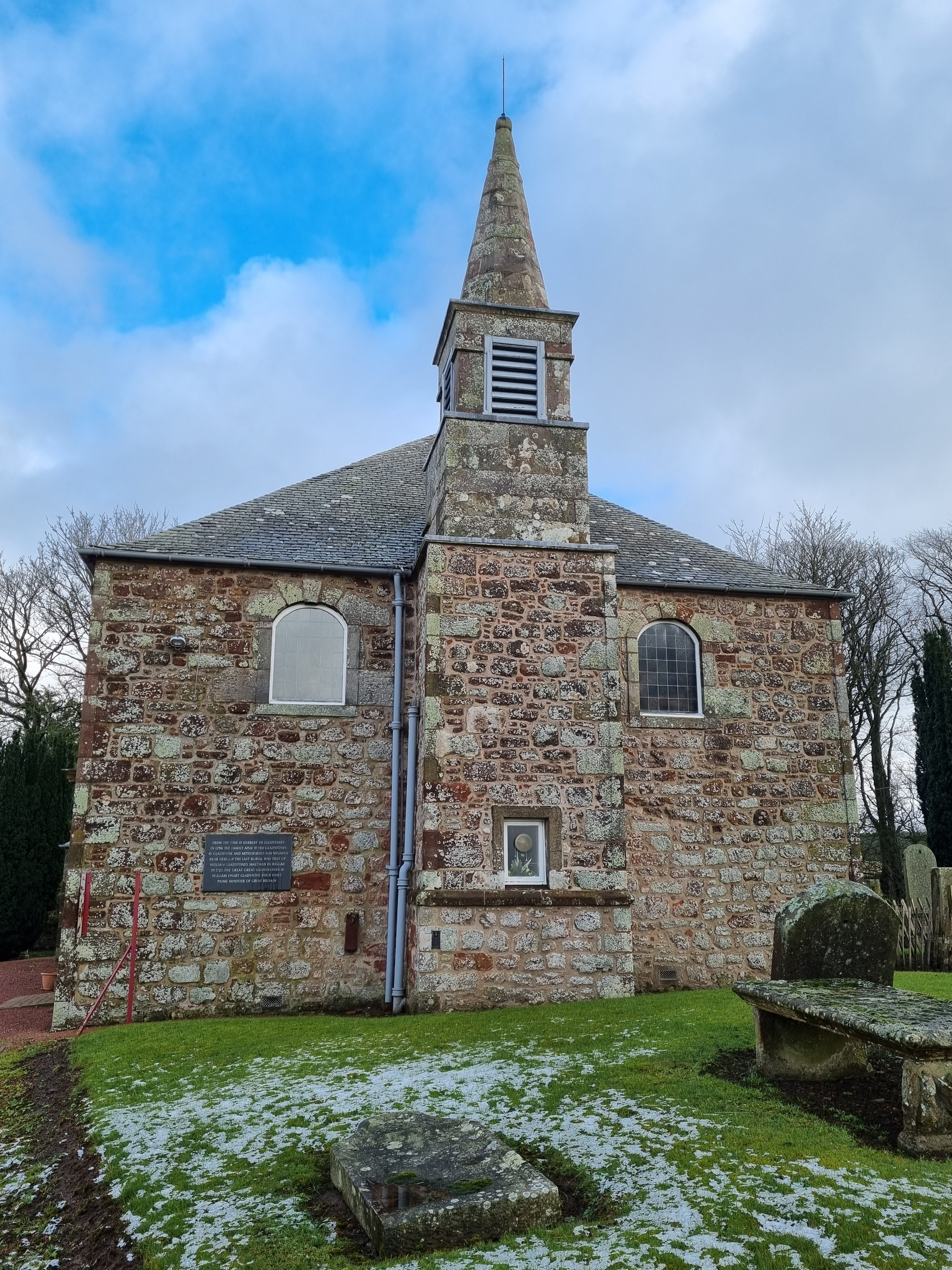
Libberton Parish Church front view.

There are several prehistoric Hillforts in the area, including West Whitecastle. However, over centuries, West Whitecatle has been extensively disturbed by ploughing and tree planting. A carved stone dating to the late 13th or early 14th century has also been found within the fort at West Whitecastle Farm (just to the west) of Libberton. A camp earthwork with a circular enclosure lies to the east of the village at Bowmuir. Another earthwork is also near Libberton at Craigieburn. A polished greenstone axe was found there circa 1900 and this was purchased by the National Museum of Antiquities of Scotland.

Libberton has a long history as an agricultural settlement. In 1660, the village was incorporated as a parish with Quothquan. Much of the parish was historically owned by the Lords Dalzell before being sold to Sir George Lockhart in 1676.

In 1811, the population of the village was recorded as 749 and by 1831 this had risen to 773. There were two Smithies in the town, the buildings are now in residential use.

In 1854, Liberton Mains farmhouse was built. The adjacent housing development at Libberon Mains was built after 2007 following an archeological survey. The surrounding area has several Cropmarks.

The village red telephone box is of the K6 design. It dates to 1935 and is Category B listed.

=== Church ===
Libberton parish church was built in 1812. The church is a congregation of the Church of Scotland. The church interior was refurbished in 1902. The 2 story manse was built in 1824 and is also Category B listed. In 1892, a medieval bronze cauldron was found near the Church and is now in the National Museum of Scotland.

== Education ==
Libberton Primary School is located just outside the village on the Muir road to Quothquan.
