= Dunsyre =

Coordinates: 55°43′05″N 3°28′40″W

Dunsyre: Scottish Gaelic: Dùn Saghair
- Location within South Lanarkshire
- OS grid reference: NT073481
- Council area: South Lanarkshire
- Lieutenancy area: Lanarkshire
- Country: Scotland
- Sovereign state: United Kingdom
- Post town: LANARK
- Postcode district: ML11
- Police: Scotland
- Fire: Scottish
- Ambulance: Scottish
- UK Parliament: Dumfriesshire, Clydesdale and Tweeddale
- Scottish Parliament: Clydesdale

Dunsyre (Scottish Gaelic: Dùn Saghair) is a village in South Lanarkshire, Scotland. It is 10 kilometres (6 miles) from Carnwath. Dunsyre is associated with an ancient barony and parish church. The name of Dunsyre is of Celtic origin and is supposed to signify the "Hill of the Seer." It is located by the burn known as the South Medwin Water.

In a charter dated June 29, 1444, William Douglas, 8th Earl of Douglas, gave lands in Dunsyre to Patrick Hepburn, 1st Lord Hailes, who subsequently became known as Sir Patrick Hepburn of Dunsyre. The charter was confirmed on May 20, 1452.

From 1867 until 1945 Dunsyre was served by a railway branch from Carstairs to Dolphinton, originally built by the Caledonian Railway, and the disused embankment of this runs along the south side of the village close to the church.

The surface is generally elevated, and rises further still into the surrounding hills. Dunsyre Hill overlooks the area from the north and Blackmount from the south. Dunsyre Hill forms the termination of the Pentland Hills, a range extending for nearly 32 km (20 mi) from the immediate vicinity of Edinburgh. This hill has an elevation of 150 metres (500 ft) above the general surface of the lands, and of 401 metres (1,315 ft) above sea level; a small range of gradually diminishing hills branches off towards the west from it, stretching to the parish of Carnwath. Between the Dunsyre and Walston ranges is a level valley about 5 km (3 mi) in length and 1.6 km (1 mi) wide. The small river of the South Medwin runs along the valley, eventually joining the river Clyde. The ornamental garden Little Sparta lies immediately to the west of the village.

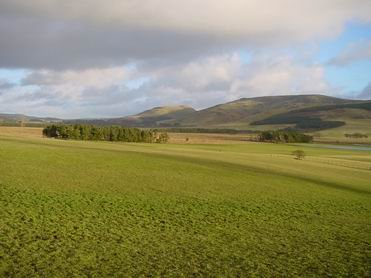
Black Mount
Black Mount (516 m or 1,693 ft) looking over Dunsyre and the South Medwin Valley.

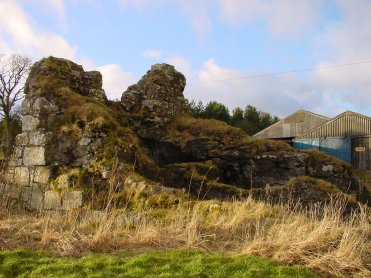
Westhall Tower
The remains of the 16th-century tower at Westhall Farm, Dunsyre. Originally built in the Peel tower style.
