= Old Sheriff Court, Glasgow =

Judicial building in Glasgow, Scotland

Old Sheriff Court
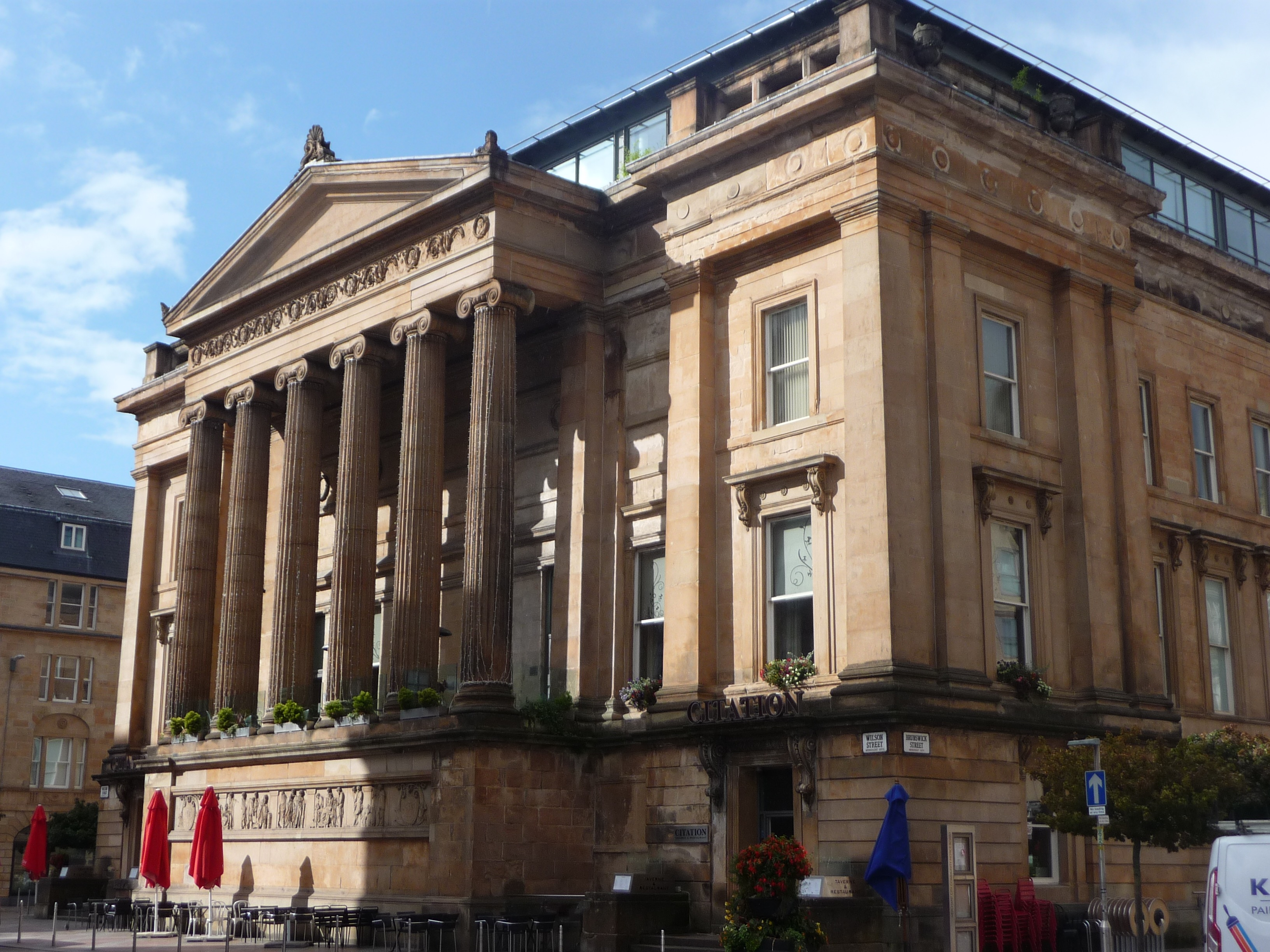
- Old Sheriff Court

- Shown in Glasgow
- 55.8592°N 4.2475°W
- Location: Wilson Street, Glasgow

History
- Built: 1844

Site notes
- Architect: Clarke & Bell
- Architectural style: Neoclassical style

Listed Building – Category B
- Official name: County Buildings and Courthouse, 40-50 Wilson Street, Glasgow
- Designated: 15 December 1970
- Reference no.: LB32807

The Old Sheriff Court is a former municipal and judicial building in Wilson Street, Glasgow, Scotland. The building, which is home to the Scottish Youth Theatre, is a Category B listed building.

== History ==
The structure was commissioned to serve as the city and county buildings for the City of Glasgow (Note: The city council had previously been based in the public buildings in the Saltmarket.) and Lanarkshire respectively. (Note: Until 1890, Lanarkshire was divided into three administrative wards: lower (Glasgow), middle (Hamilton) and upper (Lanark) and this building was the meeting place for the lower ward.) The foundation stone for the new building was laid on 18 November 1842. The southern section, forming the city and county buildings, and the central section, forming the Merchant's House, were designed by Clarke & Bell in the neoclassical style, built in ashlar stone and were completed in 1844. The design involved a symmetrical main frontage facing onto the Wilson Street; the central section was formed by a stylobate on which was placed a full-height hexastyle portico with Ionic order columns supporting an entablature, a frieze and a pediment. The outer bays featured doorways flanked by brackets supporting cornices on the ground floor, sash windows flanked by brackets supporting cornices on the first floor, and plain sash windows on the second floor. The frieze was carved to the design of scenes of 'Trial by Jury' by the sculptor, Walter Buchan. Internally, the principal rooms were the city council chamber and offices of the town clerks on the west side of the building, and the offices of the sheriff principal, the sheriff substitute and the sheriff clerk as well as a courtroom on the east side of the building.

The southern section was extended to the north to connect with the central section to a design by Clarke & Bell between 1868 and 1871 and the complex was extended further north to Ingram Street to a design by Clarke & Bell to create larger council chambers and municipal offices for the city council which opened on 24 February 1874. The city council moved out again when they relocated to the new Glasgow City Chambers in George Square in October 1889.

The building continued to be used as a facility for dispensing justice but, following the implementation of the Local Government (Scotland) Act 1889, which established county councils in every county, part of the complex was allocated for offices for use by Lanark County Council, who held their meetings in the sheriff's court. The county council also moved out again when they relocated to Lanarkshire House in Ingram Street in 1930.

After the new Glasgow Sheriff Court in Carlton Place in the Gorbals area of Glasgow was opened by Queen Elizabeth II on 29 July 1986, the Old Sheriff Court was left vacant and began to deteriorate. The building was the subject of a major programme of restoration works carried out on behalf of Persimmon to a design by SMC Parr Architects in 2005. It saw the building converted into a theatre complex for the Scottish Youth Theatre, 62 residential apartments and the creation of Citation Public House and Restaurant by Glaswegian restaurateur Ryan Barrie. The project was subsequently recognised by an award for Best Practice in Regeneration from the British Urban Regeneration Association.

== See also ==
- List of listed buildings in Glasgow/8
