= Westwoodhill =

Suburb of East Kilbride, South Lanarkshire, Scotland

Coordinates: 55°45′17″N 4°12′10″W

Westwoodhill, alternatively Westwood Hill, is the informal name for a residential area in the southern area of the Westwood Neighbourhood of the Scottish new town East Kilbride in South Lanarkshire. Its perception as a distinct residential unit arises from the presence of Westwood Hill road, Westwood Hill Recreation Area, and Westwoodhill Church, but it was never conceived as its own neighbourhood.

Along with the road of Murrayhill, the edge of this area forms a boundary between Westwood and The Murray neighbourhoods. The area's northern boundary is marked by a linear 'greenway' style park, which incorporates municipal grassland, informal landscaping, former pitches, a small community orchard, and a couple of children's playparks. The western part of this park comprises Westwood Hill Recreation Area.

The eponymous Highway, distinctly spelled as 'Westwood Hill' rather than 'Westwoodhill', serves as the areas main arterial road that connects it with the neighbourhood of Greenhills and the suburbs of Newlandsmuir and Mossneuk, and with main roads leading to East Kilbride Town Centre, The Murray, and greater Westwood.

Within the area lies Westwoodhill Evangelical Church and Our Lady of Lourdes Roman Catholic Church.

'Local shopping' needs were originally catered for by the provision of a hybrid block of flats and several shops colloquially known as the Melbourne Shops - after their associated address of Melbourne Avenue. This area continues to provide local shopping needs.
