= Wilson Street =

Wilson Street may refer to:

- Wilson Street (Glasgow, Scotland)
- Wilson Street (Hamilton, Ontario)
