= Pollokshaws Burgh Hall =

Municipal building in Pollokshaws, Scotland

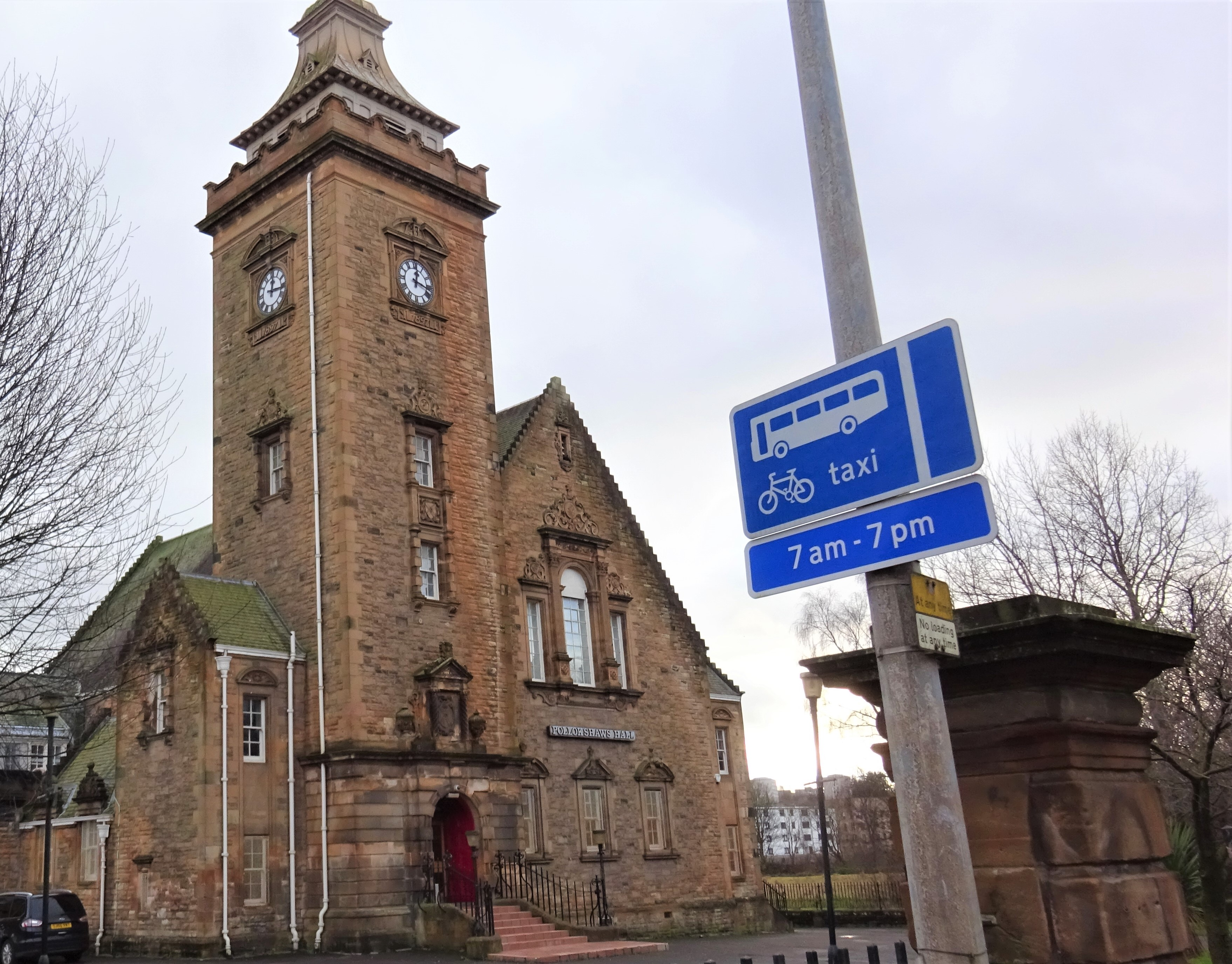
- Pollokshaws Burgh Hall

- Shown in Glasgow
- 55.8254°N 4.2984°W
- Location: Glasgow

History
- Built: 1898

Site notes
- Architect: Robert Rowand Anderson
- Architectural style: Renaissance style

Listed Building – Category A
- Designated: 15 December 1970
- Reference no.: LB33953

The Pollokshaws Burgh Hall is a municipal building at the edge of Pollok Country Park, Glasgow, Scotland. The burgh hall, which was briefly the headquarters of Pollokshaws Burgh Council, is a Category A listed building.

== History ==
The building was commissioned and endowed for future maintenance by the politician, Sir John Stirling Maxwell of Pollok House as a gift for the people of Pollokshaws. The site he selected in Pollokshaws Road had formed part of the Old Pollok Estate, which had been home to the Maxwell family for over 700 years.

The burgh hall was designed by Robert Rowand Anderson in the Scottish Renaissance style and was officially opened by Maxwell on 7 December 1898. The design involved an asymmetrical main frontage with four bays facing Pollokshaws Road; the left bay featured a round-headed doorway on the ground floor with a square tower with cupola above of a similar style to the then recently-demolished Glasgow College in the High Street; the right hand three bays contained three windows on the ground floor; there was a large round-headed window on the first floor flanked by two smaller windows and a crow-stepped gable above.

The building was used as the headquarters of the independent burgh of Pollokshaws until the burgh was annexed by Glasgow Corporation in 1912. A war memorial commemorating local people who had died in the First World War was unveiled in front of the burgh hall by the local member of parliament, Sir John Gilmour, on 28 October 1922. The hall was used as a British Restaurant during the Second World War.

After functioning as a community centre for Glasgow Corporation and then, from 1975, for Strathclyde Regional Council, it was deemed surplus to requirements in the late 1990s and the management of the building was transferred to the Pollokshaws Burgh Hall Trust in October 2000. A Wurlitzer organ with three manuals, which had originally been installed in the Ritz cinema in Stockport and then transferred to Clydebank Town Hall in September 1998, was installed in Pollokshaws Burgh Hall in 2007. The Scottish entertainer, Gordon Cree, who appeared to have developed a special interest in the Wurlitzer, performed on it at a concert in April 2009.

== Architecture ==
The dominant feature is the tower which is intended to replicate the tower on the old Glasgow College in the High Street.

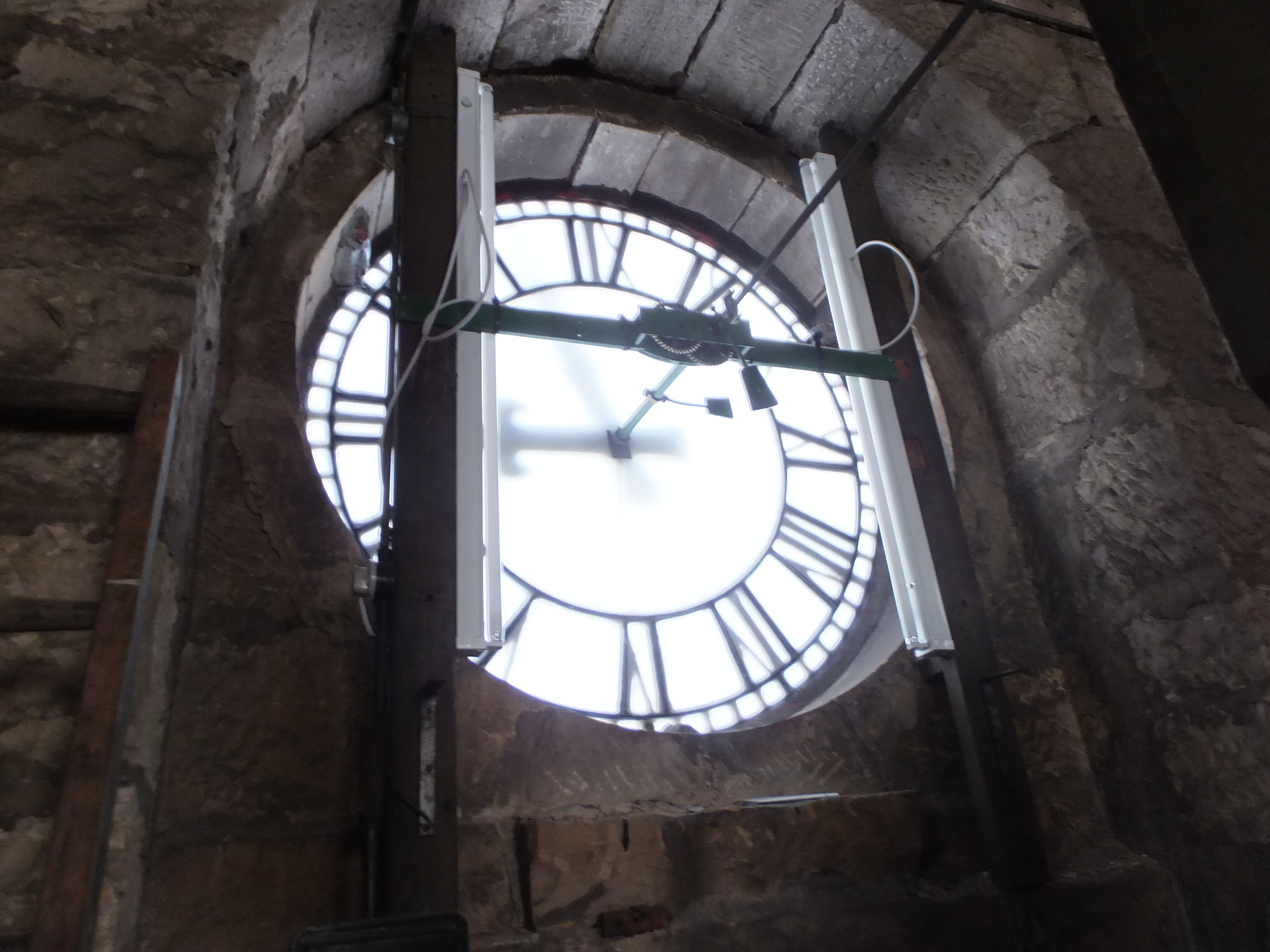
Inside the clock tower

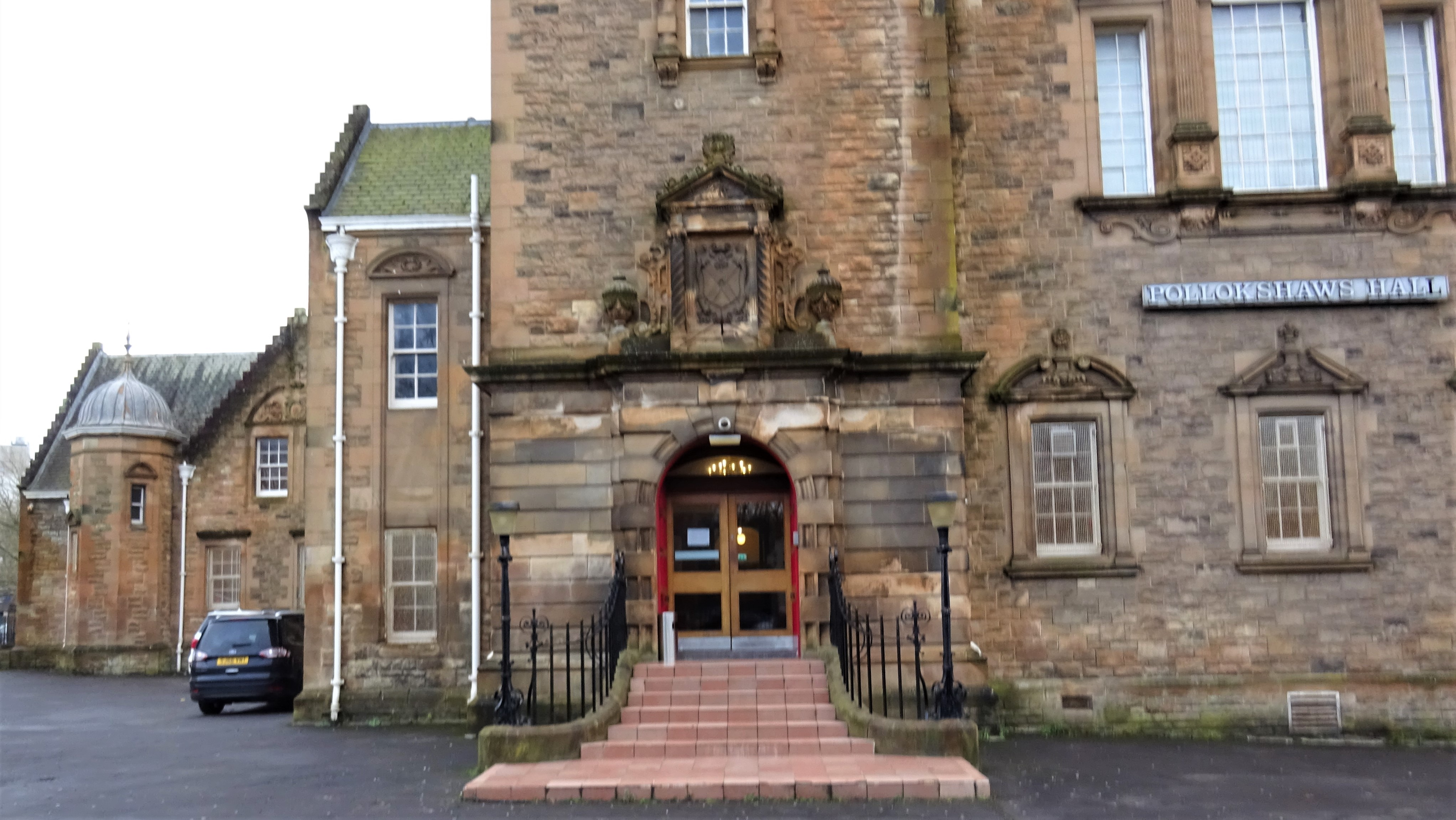
The entrance to the hall

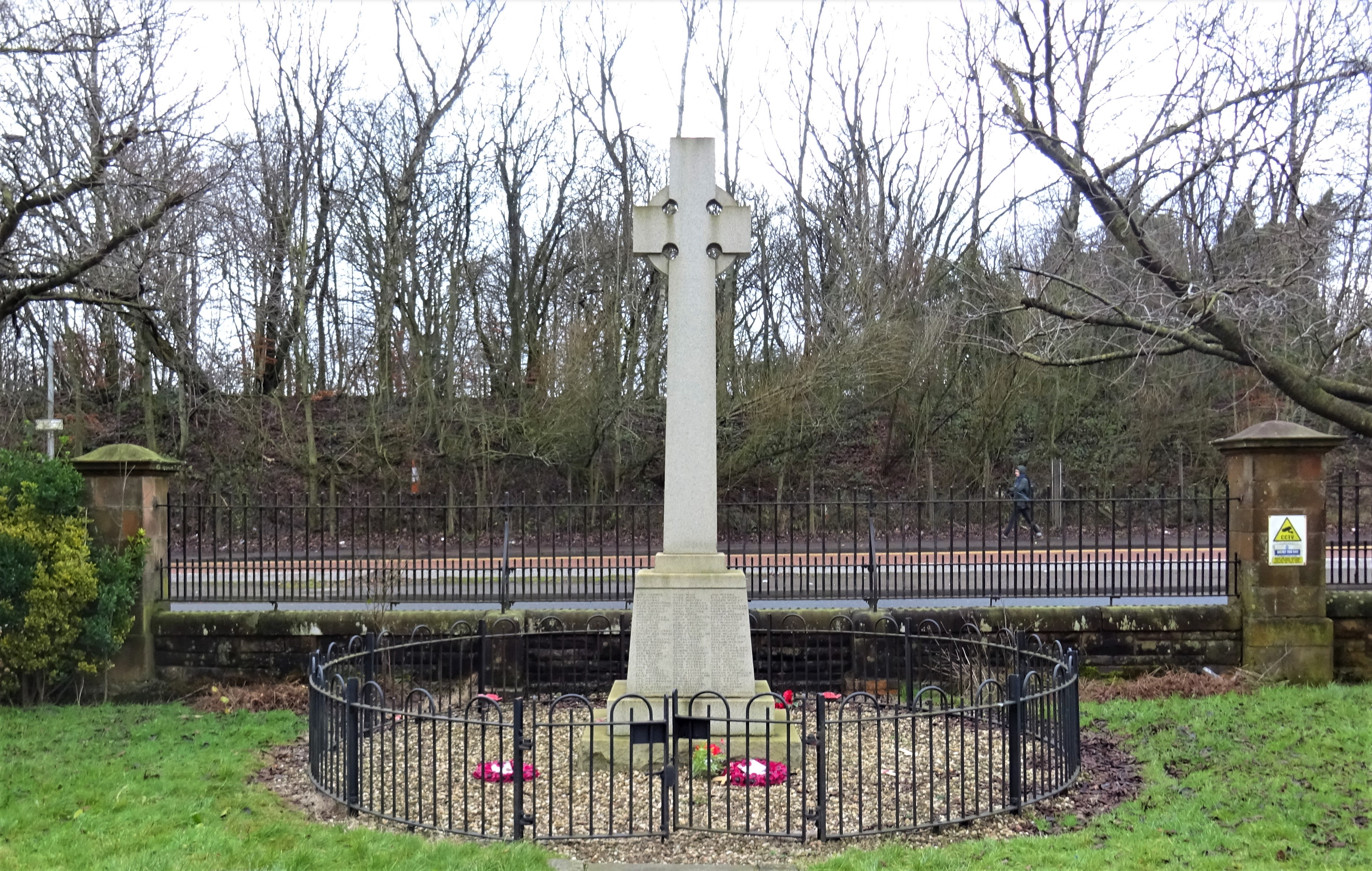
The war memorial at the hall

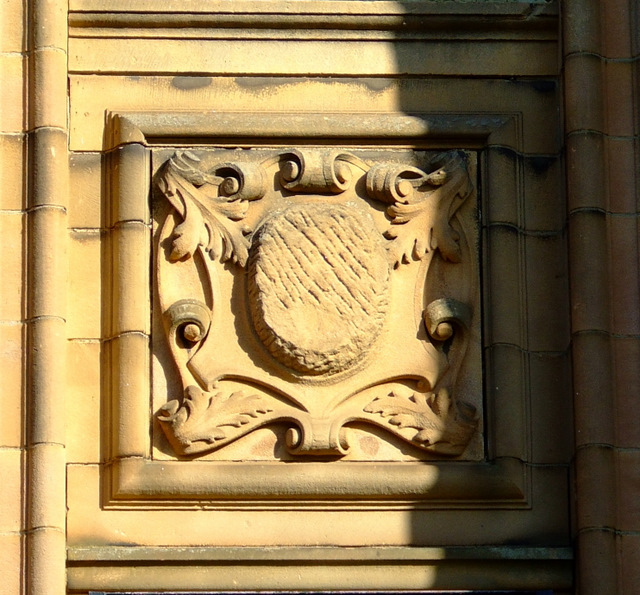
one of five square carvings on the hall

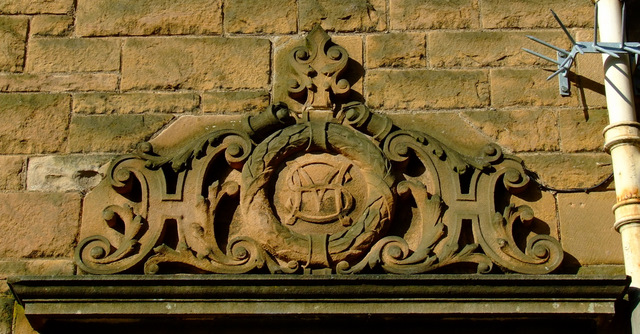
Carving above the rear door

== See also ==
- List of Category A listed buildings in Glasgow
- List of listed buildings in Glasgow/8
