= Wiston, South Lanarkshire =

Coordinates: 55°34′19″N 3°39′25″W

Wiston
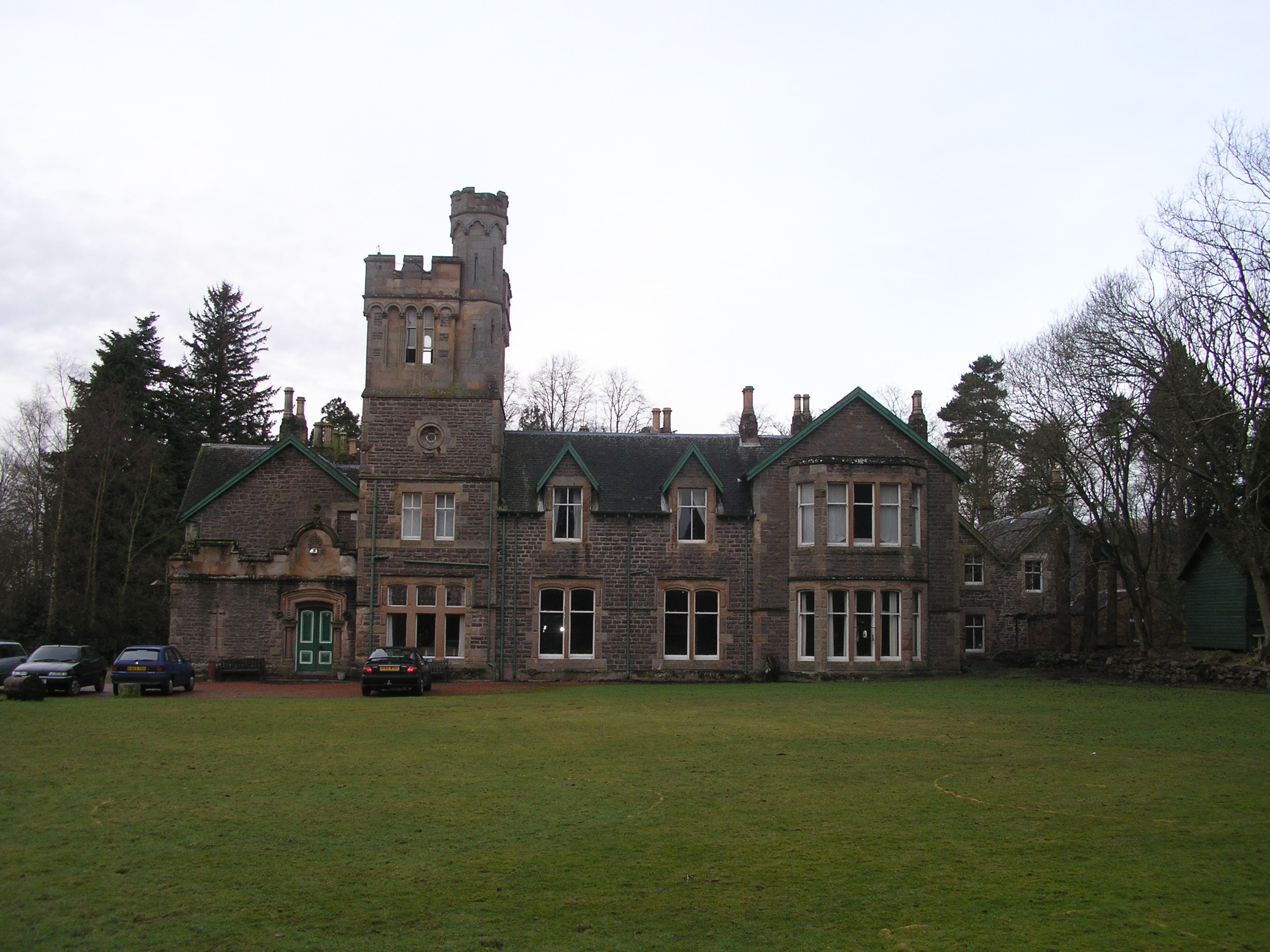
- Wiston Lodge

- Location within South Lanarkshire
- OS grid reference: NS957317
- Council area: South Lanarkshire
- Lieutenancy area: Lanarkshire
- Country: Scotland
- Sovereign state: United Kingdom
- Post town: Biggar
- Postcode district: ML12
- Police: Scotland
- Fire: Scottish
- Ambulance: Scottish
- UK Parliament: Dumfriesshire, Clydesdale and Tweeddale
- Scottish Parliament: Clydesdale

Wiston is a small village in South Lanarkshire, Scotland. It is located 13 miles (21 km) south east of Lanark and 8 miles (13 km) south west of Biggar.

Located in the Southern Uplands it is immediately to the south of Tinto, one of the highest points in the locality. The Garf Water, a tributary of the River Clyde, runs through the village.

The village has hosted the Tinto Folk Music Festival. Wiston Lodge is a former Victorian hunting lodge built in the 1850s set in a 55-acre (22 ha) estate. It is now a venue for team-building activities including programmes leading to John Muir Awards.
