= List of listed buildings in Glasgow/8 =

This is a list of listed buildings in Glasgow, Scotland.

== List ==
Name	Location	Date Listed	Grid Ref. (Note: Sometimes known as OSGB36, the grid reference (where provided) is based on the British national grid reference system used by the Ordnance Survey. • "Guide to National Grid". Ordnance Survey. • "Get-a-map". Ordnance Survey.)	Geo-coordinates	Notes	LB Number (Note: Historic Environment Scotland assign a unique alphanumeric identifier to each designated site in Scotland, for listed buildings this always begins with "LB", for example "LB12345".)	Image
28 Tunnel Street, Glasgow Harbour Tunnel, Otherwise Known As Finnieston Tunnel, Shaft And Rotunda				55°51′31″N 4°17′00″W	Category B	33203	Upload another image
134, 136 Wellington Street, 105-113 (Odd Nos) Bath Street And 52 Bath Lane, Wellington Buildings				55°51′50″N 4°15′32″W	Category B	33219	Upload Photo
91-95 (Odd Nos) West George Street And 53 West Nile Street				55°51′43″N 4°15′19″W	Category B	33222	Upload another image
213 West George Street				55°51′45″N 4°15′37″W	Category B	33228	Upload Photo
57, 61 St Vincent Street				55°51′40″N 4°15′18″W	Category B	33131	Upload Photo
93 St Vincent Street And 20, 22 Renfield Street, Savings Bank Of Glasgow, (Bank Of Scotland Chambers)				55°51′41″N 4°15′24″W	Category B	33135	Upload another image
115, 117, St Vincent Street				55°51′41″N 4°15′28″W	Category A	33138	Upload another image
119-123 (Odd Nos) St Vincent Street And 112-118 (Even Nos) Hope Street, Liverpool And London And Globe Insurance Buildings				55°51′41″N 4°15′29″W	Category B	33139	Upload another image
84-94 (Even Nos) St Vincent Street				55°51′42″N 4°15′21″W	Category A	33153	Upload Photo
102, 104 St Vincent Street And 26, 26A And 26B Renfield Street				55°51′42″N 4°15′23″W	Category B	33155	Upload another image
232-234 (Even Nos) St Vincent Street				55°51′45″N 4°15′47″W	Category B	33164	Upload another image
119-121 (Odd Nos) Sauchiehall Street, Hope Street And Bath Street And Including Arch Over Sauchiehall Lane				55°51′51″N 4°15′28″W	Category B	33170	Upload another image
199-215 (Odd Nos) Sauchiehall Street And 289 West Campbell Street				55°51′54″N 4°15′39″W	Category B	33172	Upload Photo
63-77 (Odd Nos) Nelson Mandela Place, West George Street With 153-159 (Odd Nos) Buchanan Street, Former Glasgow Stock Exchange				55°51′42″N 4°15′15″W	Category A	33089	Upload another image
201 North Street, Kent Road, And Berkeley Street, Mitchell Library				55°51′54″N 4°16′20″W	Category B	33095	Upload another image
100 Stobcross Road, Queen's Dock, Former Hydraulic Pumping Station				55°51′44″N 4°17′48″W	Category B	33098	Upload Photo
203-217 (Odd Nos) Renfrew Street, Incorporated Dental Hospital				55°51′59″N 4°15′59″W	Category B	33106	Upload another image
6 Rose Street				55°51′56″N 4°15′41″W	Category B	33117	Upload Photo
6 Gordon Street, Part Of Former Commercial Bank				55°51′38″N 4°15′18″W	Category A	33030	Upload Photo
42-44 (Even Nos) Jamaica Street 5-9 (Odd Nos) Midland Street				55°51′26″N 4°15′27″W	Category B	33066	Upload Photo
54-64 (Even Nos) Kelvingrove Street				55°51′58″N 4°17′00″W	Category B	33074	Upload Photo
23, 33, 43, 53 Kent Road				55°51′52″N 4°16′25″W	Category B	33077	Upload Photo
69 Kent Road (Former St Vincent Church Of Scotland)				55°51′51″N 4°16′30″W	Category C(S)	33078	Upload Photo
91 Buchanan Street				55°51′36″N 4°15′17″W	Category A	32998	Upload another image
123-129 (Odd Nos) Buchanan Street, Carron Building				55°51′39″N 4°15′16″W	Category B	33001	Upload Photo
147 Buchanan Street And St Vincent Street, Former Western Club				55°51′41″N 4°15′15″W	Category A	33002	Upload another image See more images
1E Gilmorehill, University Of Glasgow, Department Of Botany				55°52′21″N 4°17′30″W	Category B	32917	Upload another image
1 Gilmorehill, University Of Glasgow Lion And Unicorn Staircase				55°52′17″N 4°17′24″W	Category A	32922	Upload another image
11-13 (Odd Nos) University Gardens				55°52′23″N 4°17′29″W	Category B	32930	Upload Photo
21-43 (Odd Nos) Ashton Lane, Mews Cottages Including Grosvenor Cafe				55°52′28″N 4°17′35″W	Category C(S)	32936	Upload Photo
361-371 (Odd Nos) Argyle Street And 80 James Watt Street				55°51′31″N 4°15′49″W	Category B	32942	Upload Photo
1087-1119 (Odd Nos) Argyle Street				55°51′52″N 4°17′03″W	Category B	32943	Upload Photo
1155-1163 (Odd Nos) Argyle Street				55°51′54″N 4°17′08″W	Category C(S)	32945	Upload Photo
1287-1323 (Odd Nos) Argyle Street				55°52′00″N 4°17′26″W	Category C(S)	32947	Upload Photo
316-336 (Even Nos) Argyle Street, Blythswood Hotel Including "Duke Of Wellington" Public House				55°51′32″N 4°15′42″W	Category B	32951	Upload Photo
181-199 (Odd Nos) Bath Street And Blythswood Street				55°51′52″N 4°15′47″W	Category A	32960	Upload another image See more images
52 Partickhill Road, 9 Partickhill Court				55°52′28″N 4°18′28″W	Category B	32894	Upload Photo
53-63 (Odd Nos) Peel Street				55°52′24″N 4°18′39″W	Category B	32899	Upload Photo
65-73 (Odd Nos) Southpark Avenue				55°52′24″N 4°17′12″W	Category C(S)	32906	Upload Photo
1D Gilmorehill, University Of Glasgow, Anatomical Building				55°52′17″N 4°17′13″W	Category B	32916	Upload Photo
78 Church Street, 10B Dumbarton Road, Western Infirmary, Pathological Block, And Boundary Wall				55°52′20″N 4°17′48″W	Category B	32858	Upload Photo
Kelvingrove Park Monument to Lord Kelvin				55°52′11″N 4°17′13″W	Category B	32881	Upload another image
51 Wilson Street				55°51′30″N 4°14′51″W	Category B	32805	Upload Photo
40-50 (Even Nos) Wilson Street With 70-74 Hutcheson Street, 117 Brunswick Street, 149 Ingram Street (The Former County Buildings Or Court Houses)				55°51′34″N 4°14′51″W	Category B	32807	Upload another image
52 Parson Street, St Mungo's Retreat With Retaining Walls, Piers, Gates And Railings				55°51′56″N 4°14′15″W	Category B	32813	Upload Photo
Royal Exchange Square, Royal Bank Of Scotland				55°51′37″N 4°15′13″W	Category A	32827	Upload another image
1-15 (Odd Nos) St Vincent Place With 159-161 (Odd Nos) Queen Street				55°51′39″N 4°15′08″W	Category B	32835	Upload Photo
168-182 (Even Nos) Saltmarket And 4, 6, 8 Jocelyn Square				55°51′16″N 4°14′47″W	Category B	32843	Upload Photo
23-33 (Odd Nos) Ingram Street				55°51′32″N 4°14′32″W	Category B	32731	Upload Photo
191 Ingram Street, Lanarkshire House, Corinthian Club (Former Sheriff Court And Justice Of Peace Court)				55°51′34″N 4°14′59″W	Category A	32735	Upload another image
158 Ingram Street, And 2 John Street, Hutcheson's Hospital				55°51′36″N 4°14′51″W	Category A	32744	Upload another image See more images
162-168 (Even Nos) Ingram Street				55°51′36″N 4°14′53″W	Category B	32745	Upload Photo
10-26 (Even Nos) King Street And 62 Parnie Street				55°51′24″N 4°14′48″W	Category B	32753	Upload Photo
77-81 (Odd Nos) Miller Street, Arthur's Warehouse				55°51′34″N 4°15′04″W	Category A	32759	Upload Photo
16-22 (Even Nos) Montrose Street				55°51′37″N 4°14′43″W	Category B	32765	Upload Photo
130-138 (Even Nos) Trongate				55°51′27″N 4°14′50″W	Category B	32786	Upload Photo
Cathedral Square, Statue Of James White Of Overtoun				55°51′46″N 4°14′11″W	Category B	32657	Upload another image
168 Clyde Street And Fox Lane, St Andrew's Roman Catholic Cathedral				55°51′20″N 4°15′10″W	Category A	32666	Upload another image See more images
Clyde Street, Victoria Bridge				55°51′14″N 4°15′04″W	Category A	32669	Upload another image
266-268 Clyde Street				55°51′22″N 4°15′20″W	Category B	32671	Upload another image See more images
29 Cochrane Street And 18 John Street Formerly The John Street Church				55°51′36″N 4°14′51″W	Category A	32672	Upload another image
20-40 (Even Nos) Cochrane Street, 20 John Street And 233-235 (Odd Nos) George Street, Extension To The City Chambers, And Paired Screen Archways Over John Street				55°51′40″N 4°14′51″W	Category A	32675	Upload another image
George Square, The Cenotaph				55°51′40″N 4°14′58″W	Category B	32692	Upload another image
George Square, Walter Scott Memorial Column				55°51′40″N 4°15′01″W	Category A	32696	Upload another image See more images
George Square, James Watt Statue				55°51′40″N 4°15′04″W	Category A	32697	Upload another image See more images
George Square, James Oswald Statue				55°51′40″N 4°15′02″W	Category B	32699	Upload another image
George Square, Prince Albert Statue				55°51′40″N 4°15′04″W	Category A	32701	Upload another image
61-65 (Odd Nos) High Street And Bell Street, (Bows Emporium)				55°51′28″N 4°14′35″W	Category B	32719	Upload Photo
24-26 (Even Nos) Cleveden Road				55°53′06″N 4°18′09″W	Category C(S)	32606	Upload Photo
122-132 (Even Nos) Argyle Street With 2-8 Buchanan Street				55°51′30″N 4°15′16″W	Category B	32618	Upload another image
45-51 (Odd Nos) Bell Street With 62-80 (Even Nos) Albion Street And 5-19 (Odd Nos) Walls Street Including Former Cheese Market				55°51′29″N 4°14′38″W	Category B	32620	Upload Photo
1-5 (Odd Nos) Blackfriars Street And 97-101 (Odd Nos) High Street				55°51′30″N 4°14′33″W	Category B	32624	Upload Photo
2 Queens Place (Westdel), 10 Kinnoul Lane And 10 Crown Road North, (Royston); With Boundary Walls And Gatepiers				55°52′35″N 4°18′00″W	Category B	32579	Upload another image
4 And 4A Sydenham Road				55°52′45″N 4°18′12″W	Category B	32586	Upload Photo
13-41 (Odd Nos) Kingsborough Gardens				55°52′40″N 4°18′19″W	Category B	32542	Upload Photo
730 Great Western Road; Botanic Gardens Glass Houses				55°52′46″N 4°17′25″W	Category B	32512	Upload Photo
8, 9 And 10 Bowmont Gardens				55°52′38″N 4°17′54″W	Category C(S)	32479	Upload Photo
16 Cleveden Road, With Garden Walls And Gatepiers				55°53′03″N 4°18′06″W	Category B	32488	Upload Photo
75 Grange Road, Former Teachers' Resource And Computer Centre (Former Queen's Park School) Including Gates And Railings				55°49′40″N 4°15′54″W	Category B	32433	Upload Photo
335-347 (Odd Nos) Langside Road				55°50′01″N 4°15′48″W	Category B	32434	Upload another image See more images
334, 336 And 346 Langside Road				55°50′02″N 4°15′50″W	Category B	32436	Upload another image See more images
24 Queen's Drive The Knowe Including Gatepiers				55°49′53″N 4°15′34″W	Category C(S)	32446	Upload another image See more images
26, 28 Queen's Drive Including Gatepiers				55°49′54″N 4°15′35″W	Category B	32447	Upload another image See more images
415-447 (Odd Nos) Victoria Road				55°50′10″N 4°15′53″W	Category B	32460	Upload another image See more images
509-515 (Odd Nos) Victoria Road And 4 Albert Road				55°50′04″N 4°15′55″W	Category B	32462	Upload another image See more images
822-830 (Even Nos) Pollokshaws Road, 2 Marywood Square And 1 Queen Square				55°50′06″N 4°16′23″W	Category B	32405	Upload another image See more images
Albert Road, 60 Dixon Road, Holyrood Rc School Including Janitor's Lodge And Playground Walls				55°49′58″N 4°15′09″W	Category B	32415	Upload another image See more images
47 Bankhall Street, Shoe Warehouse (Former Govanhill Picture House)				55°50′10″N 4°15′22″W	Category B	32425	Upload another image
318 Calder Street And Hollybrook Street, Holy Cross Primary School				55°50′10″N 4°15′18″W	Category B	32426	Upload another image See more images
16 Algie Street, 122 Langside Avenue And Battle Place, Langside Hill Church And Boundary Walls And Gatepiers				55°49′40″N 4°16′18″W	Category B	32358	Upload another image See more images
54 Cleveden Drive, Boundary Walls And Gatepiers				55°53′03″N 4°18′20″W	Category B	32309	Upload Photo
1103 Great Western Road, 8 Whittingehame Gardens				55°53′12″N 4°19′02″W	Category C(S)	32329	Upload Photo
996 Great Western Road, "Glendoune", Boundary Walls And Gatepiers				55°53′00″N 4°18′16″W	Category B	32333	Upload Photo
146 Southbrae Drive				55°53′02″N 4°20′37″W	Category B	32340	Upload Photo
10 Gairbraid Avenue, Maryhill Burgh Halls (Now Maryhill Community Centre)				55°53′27″N 4°17′27″W	Category B	32349	Upload another image
Woodside Crescent/Sauchiehall Street, Cameron Memorial Fountain				55°51′59″N 4°16′20″W	Category B	32269	Upload another image See more images
19,21,23,25,27,29, Squire Street And 69 Northinch Street, Former Whiteinch Jordanvale Parish Church And Hall				55°52′21″N 4°20′05″W	Category B	32282	Upload Photo
17-41 (Odd Nos) West Princes Street				55°52′12″N 4°16′11″W	Category B	32256	Upload Photo
49 West Princes Street				55°52′13″N 4°16′13″W	Category B	32257	Upload Photo
311 Woodlands Road, Woodside Public School				55°52′20″N 4°16′44″W	Category B	32263	Upload another image
25 Lynedoch Street					Category B	32227	Upload another image
27 Lynedoch Street				55°52′06″N 4°16′32″W	Category B	32228	Upload Photo
2-8 (Even Nos) Melrose Street				55°52′17″N 4°16′14″W	Category B	32229	Upload Photo
Colebrooke Street Glasgow Academy				55°52′33″N 4°16′46″W	Category B	32186	Upload Photo
471 Great Western Road Savings Bank, Hillhead				55°52′31″N 4°16′54″W	Category C(S)	32201	Upload Photo
416 And 420 Great Western Road/433 North Woodside Road Lansdowne Parish Church (Church Of Scotland)				55°52′28″N 4°16′41″W	Category A	32205	Upload another image
24-28 (Even Nos) Herbert Street (Herbert House)				55°52′30″N 4°16′30″W	Category B	32207	Upload Photo
20-30 (Even Nos) Bank Street And 15-19 (Odd Nos) Glasgow Street				55°52′27″N 4°17′01″W	Category B	32180	Upload Photo
Kelvingrove Park, Kelvin Way, Kelvingrove Bandstand And Amphitheatre				55°52′10″N 4°17′09″W	Category B	46592	Upload another image See more images
Carmunnock Road And Glenacre Terrace, Castlemilk West Parish Church (Church Of Scotland)				55°48′25″N 4°14′33″W	Category B	48026	Upload another image
685 Alexandra Parade St Andrew's East Church Hall And Railings				55°51′47″N 4°12′30″W	Category A	48569	Upload Photo
229 Woodlands Road, Woodlands Methodist Church (Former Swedenborgian New Jerusalem Church) Including Boundary Wall And Gatepiers				55°52′15″N 4°16′37″W	Category B	48629	Upload Photo
87 Renfield Street And 49 Bath Street, Former Refuge Assurance Buildings Including Railings				55°51′49″N 4°15′22″W	Category C(S)	48630	Upload Photo
56 Langside Drive, Scott House				55°48′54″N 4°16′43″W	Category B	49639	Upload Photo
11, 13 And 15 Bath Street, Albert Chambers				55°51′48″N 4°15′14″W	Category B	49919	Upload Photo
860 Cumbernauld Road, St Enoch Hogganfield Church Of Scotland Church Including Hall				55°52′04″N 4°11′31″W	Category C(S)	49922	Upload another image
45 South Portland Street And 100 Norfolk Street, Deaf Connections Centre (Former Gorbals Public Library)				55°51′10″N 4°15′23″W	Category B	49979	Upload Photo
168 Renfrew Street, 18-26 Scott Street, Glasgow School Of Art, Assembly Building				55°51′59″N 4°15′51″W	Category C(S)	50513	Upload Photo
3 Tinto Road Including Water Garden, Boundary Walls And Gatepiers				55°48′57″N 4°17′27″W	Category C(S)	50820	Upload Photo
Corner Of Great George Street And Cecil Street, Edward VIII Post Box				55°52′29″N 4°17′19″W	Category B	51529	Upload another image
100 Elderpark Street, Craigton Road, Nimmo Drive, Elderpark Workspace (Former Galbraith Stores Bakery)				55°51′28″N 4°19′22″W	Category C(S)	51648	Upload Photo
Victoria Park, Partick And Whiteinch War Memorial				55°52′32″N 4°19′58″W	Category C(S)	51739	Upload Photo
38 First Gardens With Boundary Walls And Fence				55°50′36″N 4°18′37″W	Category C(S)	44601	Upload Photo
340-344 (Even Nos) Argyle Street				55°51′32″N 4°15′44″W	Category B	44045	Upload Photo
583 And 585 Anniesland Road, Sherwood And Ainslea With Boundary Walls And Gates				55°53′07″N 4°21′07″W	Category B	43386	Upload Photo
8-22 (Even Nos) Prospecthill Grove, Former Langside College (Main Block) And Gatepiers				55°49′38″N 4°15′44″W	Category B	43001	Upload another image See more images
4 Bayfield Terrace, St Pius X Roman Catholic Church With Presbytery, Boundary Walls, Gates And Railings				55°54′49″N 4°21′52″W	Category B	43031	Upload another image
60 Knightswood Road, Knightswood Secondary School With Railings				55°53′27″N 4°20′17″W	Category B	43037	Upload Photo
2025 Pollokshaws Road And Bengal Street, Pollokshaws Burgh Hall				55°49′31″N 4°17′54″W	Category A	33953	Upload another image
1120 Pollokshaws Road, Shawlands Old Parish Church Including Hall				55°49′49″N 4°16′58″W	Category B	33957	Upload Photo
Pollokshaws Road, Viaduct Over River Cart				55°49′29″N 4°18′02″W	Category B	33958	Upload Photo
Pollokshaws Road, Railway Underbridge To South Of Pollockshaws West Station				55°49′23″N 4°18′09″W	Category B	33960	Upload Photo
71 Milnpark Street, Former Kingston Engine Works				55°51′05″N 4°16′55″W	Category B	33970	Upload Photo
136, 220 Armadale Street And Alexandra Parade, Alexandra Parade Public School Including Lodge, Playground Walls And Gatepiers				55°51′48″N 4°12′58″W	Category B	33886	Upload Photo
22 Craigpark, Including Wall And Gatepiers				55°51′41″N 4°13′18″W	Category B	33894	Upload Photo
Ladywell Street, Lady Well				55°51′39″N 4°13′57″W	Category B	33902	Upload Photo
12 Whitehill Street, Roslea Drive, Dennistoun Blackfriars Parish Church, Halls And Church Officer's House				55°51′32″N 4°13′07″W	Category B	33911	Upload Photo
1 Barrhead Road, Junction With Pollokshaws Road And Nether Auldhouse Road, Toll House Formerly 1 Cross Street				55°49′16″N 4°18′12″W	Category B	33915	Upload Photo
14 Hector Road Including Gatepiers And Boundary Walls				55°49′39″N 4°17′25″W	Category B	33924	Upload Photo
32 Langside Avenue And Deanston Drive, St Helen`S Rc Church And Hall				55°49′51″N 4°16′41″W	Category C(S)	33929	Upload another image
81 Langside Drive, Stoneleigh				55°48′47″N 4°16′39″W	Category B	33932	Upload Photo
Lochlea Road, K6 Telephone Kiosk				55°49′19″N 4°17′24″W	Category B	33937	Upload another image
141 Merrylee Road, Telephone Exchange				55°48′52″N 4°16′04″W	Category B	33939	Upload Photo
18 Moss-Side Road, Frankfort Street, Bertram Street, Former Waverley Cinema				55°49′52″N 4°16′54″W	Category A	33941	Upload another image
25 Greenhead Street, 3-23 (Odd Nos) Macphail Street				55°50′56″N 4°13′56″W	Category B	33844	Upload Photo
67-73 (Odd Nos) Greenhead Street Including Gatepiers And Railings				55°50′52″N 4°13′53″W	Category C(S)	33848	Upload Photo
15-23 (Odd Nos) London Road And 26 Gallowgate, Mercat Building				55°51′23″N 4°14′35″W	Category A	33851	Upload Photo
92-106 (Even Nos) Tobago Street				55°51′08″N 4°13′49″W	Category B	33859	Upload Photo
826 Cumbernauld Road, Smithycroft Road, St Thomas The Apostle Rc Church				55°52′01″N 4°11′33″W	Category B	33867	Upload Photo
Alexandra Parade, Fountain At Gate To Alexandra Park				55°51′47″N 4°12′35″W	Category B	33881	Upload another image
368 Alexandra Parade, Wd & Ho Wills Tobacco Factory				55°51′49″N 4°13′23″W	Category B	33883	Upload Photo

== Key ==
The scheme for classifying buildings in Scotland is:

- Category A: "buildings of national or international importance, either architectural or historic; or fine, little-altered examples of some particular period, style or building type."
- Category B: "buildings of regional or more than local importance; or major examples of some particular period, style or building type, which may have been altered."
- Category C: "buildings of local importance; lesser examples of any period, style, or building type, as originally constructed or moderately altered; and simple traditional buildings which group well with other listed buildings."

In March 2016 there were 47,288 listed buildings in Scotland. Of these, 8% were Category A, and 50% were Category B, with the remaining 42% being Category C.

== See also ==
- List of listed buildings in Glasgow
