= Maryhill Burgh Halls =

Municipal building in Maryhill, Glasgow

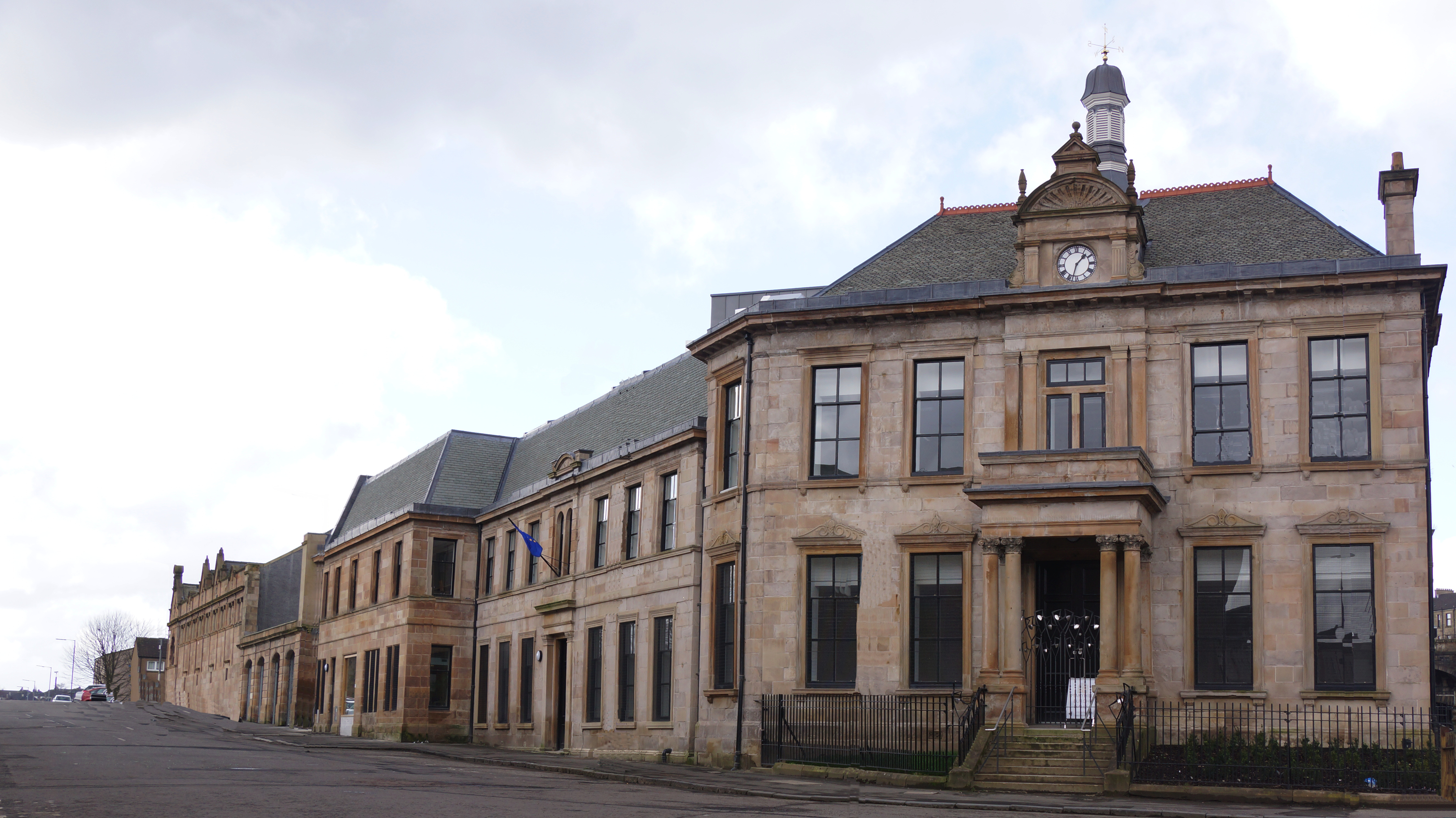
- Maryhill Burgh Halls

- Shown in Glasgow
- 55.8908°N 4.2909°W
- Location: Gairbraid Avenue, Glasgow

History
- Built: 1878

Site notes
- Architect: Duncan McNaughtan
- Architectural style: Revivalist French Renaissance style

Listed Building – Category B
- Official name: 10 Gairbraid Avenue, Maryhill Burgh Halls
- Designated: 28 February 1980
- Reference no.: LB32349

Maryhill Burgh Halls is a local heritage site located in the Maryhill area of Glasgow, a few miles North-West of Glasgow city centre. Maryhill Burgh Halls was initially opened in 1878 as a municipal building complex, which served as a police station and fire station until the 1970s. The complex fell into disuse and disrepair especially towards the late 20th century, and plans for its demolishment were proposed. However, as a result of local campaigning, the decision was taken to restore the complex and for it to be used as a community resource. Repairs, selective demolition, restoration, and development work took place between 2008 and 2011. The halls re-opened in April 2012.

Maryhill Burgh Halls is run by the Maryhill Burgh Halls Trust. The Maryhill Burgh Halls Trust was established in 2004 and is community led. Volunteers form a major and vital component of the Maryhill Burgh Halls Trust. Volunteers carry out a variety a roles within the Trust including the day to day running of the Maryhill Burgh Halls and forming a majority part of the Board of the Trust. The Maryhill Burgh Halls provides for the community office spaces, hall spaces to facilitate the hosting of events of various kinds, and a museum and exhibition space. The museum and exhibition space hosts artefacts and exhibitions relating to local heritage, local history, and other themes of interest. Various organisations operate from the Maryhill Burgh Halls including an architecture company, an accountancy firm, a local housing association, a children's nursery, and the constituency office of the Member of the Scottish Parliament for the area.

When the halls initially opened, it contained twenty stained glass windows depicting individuals carrying out various trades and occupations that could be found practiced within the local area. The windows were produced by the studio of Adam and Small and were specially commissioned for the complex. Today, the halls has eleven of the original windows on display. The remainder are stored within the collections of Glasgow Museums. Along with the eleven original panels, another ten stained glass panels are on display that were produced by artists Alec Galloway and Margo Winning around 2015. Each of the ten panels depicts a different theme of modern Maryhill. The themes depicted were chosen from suggestions given by over two hundred members of the community.

== History of the building ==
=== Early history ===
Maryhill Burgh Halls complex was commissioned in response to the growing population of the Burgh of Maryhill and ensuing lawlessness. The complex's architect was the Glasgow based Duncan McNaughton who was born in Rutherglen. The complex was designed in a revivalist French Renaissance style, and built in ashlar stone and completed in 1878. The design involved a symmetrical main frontage of five bays facing the corner of Gairbraid Avenue and Maryhill Road. The central bay featured, on the ground floor, a portico formed by two pairs of Corinthian order columns supporting an entablature and, on the first floor, a casement window flanked by two pairs of pilasters and supporting an entablature, a cornice and a panel containing a clock surmounted by a segmental pediment. The other bays were fenestrated by windows with architraves and window cills and at roof level, there was an octagonal ventilator. There was a canted bay to the left which formed part of the side elevation.

The complex consisted of a police station, a court room, a fire station, a tenement which housed the firemen, and a public hall that could seat nine hundred people. The Burgh of Maryhill being subsumed by the City of Glasgow in 1891 resulted in the civic function of the complex being lost, however it continued to be utilized for social use. A swimming baths and washhouse was added to the complex in 1898.

=== 20th Century to present day ===
The police station and fire station remained in use up until the 1970s, however the complex fell into disuse and disrepair over the course of the remainder of the 20th century and plans for its demolition were proposed. Pressure from the local community led to the restoration of Maryhill Burgh Halls and it being purposed once again as a community resource. The Maryhill Burgh Halls now provides for the community office spaces, a museum and exhibition space, and halls that can be used for the hosting of events of various kinds. It also remains a place for political debate: the Leader of the Scottish Labour Party, Richard Leonard, launched Scottish Labour's campaign for the 2019 United Kingdom general election at Maryhill Burgh Halls in November 2019.

=== Restoration of the building ===
In 2004 the Maryhill Burgh Halls Trust was set up in order to bring the complex back into use for the local community. In 2006 the Cities Growth Fund granted the Maryhill Burgh Halls Trust £1.1 million. This funding allowed the Trust to carry out various preliminary tasks pertaining the restoration of Maryhill Burgh Halls including the necessary design and planning application work. The restoration of Maryhill Burgh Halls took place between 2008 and 2011.

Stonework and masonry repairs in order to secure the stability of the structure took place in 2008. Funding for the remaining restoration and development work was secured in Autumn 2009 after five years of campaigning by the Trust. A total of £9.2 million funding for the restoration and development of the halls was secured. In November 2009 transfer of ownership of the halls, the police station, and the fire station from Glasgow City Council to the Maryhill Burgh Halls Trust took place. The main restoration and development work on the parts of the complex under the stewardship of the Maryhill Burgh Hall Trust also started in November 2009. This work was completed in November 2011, and the halls re-opened in April 2012.

The main funding sources for the restoration and development of Maryhill Burgh Halls are: Scottish Government City Growth Fund Phases 1 and 2, The National Lottery Heritage Fund, Big Lottery (Growing Community Assets), The European Regional Development Fund (ERDF), Glasgow City Council Better Glasgow Fund, Glasgow City Council Vacant and Derelict Land Fund, Scottish Government Town Centre Regeneration Fund, Historic Scotland, Scottish Government Wider Role Fund, and Robertson Trust. The baths remained under the ownership of Glasgow City Council. A separate project was undertaken by Glasgow City Council to convert the former baths into a modern leisure centre for the community of Maryhill. The leisure centre was opened in April 2010 and makes available a 25m swimming pool, sauna, gym, sports hall, dance studio, and other facilities for community use.

== Maryhill Burgh Halls Trust ==
Maryhill Burgh Halls is owned and run by the Maryhill Burgh Halls Trust. The Maryhill Burgh Halls Trust was established in November 2004. It is a partnership between local residents, Cube and Maryhill Housing Associations, Glasgow City Council, Elected Members, and officers of local organisations. Members of the public can apply to join Maryhill Burgh Halls Trust. It currently has 180 members. The Board of the Trust includes members of the public who are local residents or who work in the local area and have been or are active in Community Development Work in the area over a number of years. They are elected on to it by the members of Maryhill Burgh Halls Trust at the Annual General Meeting. The Board may also co-opt members from time to time.

== Stained glass windows ==
When Maryhill Burgh Halls first opened they contained twenty specially commissioned stained glass windows. These were removed from the halls in 1963 and were stored in the collection of Glasgow Museums. The panels were then restored through a process of cleaning, repairing, and reframing. Today, the Maryhill Burgh Halls has eleven of these panels on display along with ten specially commissioned glass panels that were produced around 2015.

=== Historic stained glass windows ===
'The Canal Boatman' stained glass panel.

The stained glass windows that were on display in the Maryhill Burgh Halls when it first opened were produced by the Glasgow studio Adam and Small. Adam and Small was founded by Stephen Adam, who was born in the vicinity of Edinburgh in 1847 and was of international renown in the field of stained-glass design and production. He had the author Robert Louis Stevenson as a school classmate and started as an apprentice of James Ballantine of Edinburgh. The panels depict ordinary people, dressed in their ordinary work clothing, carrying out various trades that could be found practiced in the Maryhill area during the period. This makes the panels unique, for at the time religion was the main theme depicted by stained glass artists. In other stained glass panels of the period where workers are depicted, they are usually depicted in classical, biblical, or medieval clothing, poses, and settings. The author Michael Donnelly writes that the commission for Maryhill Burgh Halls was "one of the most important commissions" of Stephen Adam's career. The author Ian R. Mitchell describes the stained glass panels as of "world-historic" importance for being "one of the largest and most realistic collection of portraits of labour produced in two centuries."

The titles of the glass panels in alphabetical order are: The Blacksmiths, The Boatbuilder, The Bricklayers, The Calico Printers, The Canal Boatman, The Chemical Workers, The Dye Press Worker, The Engineers, The Glassblower, The Iron Moulders, The Joiners, The Linen Bleachers, The Papermaker, The Railway Men, The Sawyer, The Soldiers, The Teacher, The Wheelwrights, and The Zinc Spelters. Due to a dearth of accounts or photographs of the historic glass panels as they were originally on display in the halls, it is currently unknown in what order they were initially displayed. Eleven of the historic stained glass windows are now on display in Maryhill Burgh Halls. Ten of them can be found mounted in the main hall, and The Canal Boatman is on display at the main entrance to the building.

=== Modern stained glass windows ===
'Made in Maryhill' stained glass panel.

In order to contribute to the lasting legacy of the Maryhill Burgh Halls restoration project, ten new stained glass windows were commissioned. The ten stained glass windows were produced by the Scottish artists Alec Galloway and Margo Winning. The themes for the modern stained glass windows were chosen to reflect themes of importance for the community of Maryhill today. The themes were chosen from suggestions gathered from over two hundred of members of the community. The suggestion were taken over a period of several months at a series of workshops, visits, and talks. The final themes chosen were: culture, diversity, education, heavy trades, regeneration, social heritage, space age, sport and leisure, workers, and youth. After approval of the final designs, each panel was built at Alec Galloway's workshop in Greenock. The titles of the panels are: Art-Beat, Down Maryhill Road, Playing the Game, Global Village, Knowledge, Going Out, Burning Spirit, Made in Maryhill, Touching the Stars, and Yesterday and Today. It is claimed that the 'Touching the Stars' window is the world’s first ‘interactive stained glass panel’, due to the inclusion of an active QR code in the window's design.

== Courtyard entrance gates ==
The entrance to the Maryhill Leisure Centre and Maryhill Burgh Halls share a common courtyard. This courtyard used to be the site of the fire station. The fire station included a three storey tenement above four stone archways. The archways remain today and form the entrance to the courtyard. In order to connect its current use to what was there in the past, the well known Scottish sculptor Andy Scott (The Kelpies in Falkirk are amongst Andy Scott's other creations) was commissioned to produce four metal gates to fill in the archways. The metal gates feature firemen in period uniforms along with period equipment and engines.

== Maryhill Museum ==
Maryhill Burgh Halls Trust is committed to collecting and making accessible the history of the Burgh Halls and Maryhill area. For this purpose a permanent museum has been created inside the Halls. The museum is a place to share the Halls' local history collection and offers opportunities for community displays. Locals are encouraged to share their memories of Maryhill as well as learn about the history of the area.

=== Recent exhibitions ===
==== Fred's War 2018 exhibition ====
Curated by Nicola McHendry, Fred's War told the story of the 1st Battalion Cameronians who achieved notoriety for selling the Great War's earliest front line photographs. Leaving from Maryhill Barracks, Fred Davidson, their 25-year-old medical officer (one of the first doctors to win the Military Cross) smuggled his camera to the front line in his medical bag. On display at the Burgh Halls was a First World War metal helmet, some medals, a nurse's cap, field glasses, various maps, a wide selection of Fred's photographs and a camera similar to that used by Fred. For this exhibition, some examples of the types of cameras which would have been used at the time were sourced. One of these was an Ansco 'Buster Brown' No.2 Box Camera which had a very old spool of medium format, 120 film inside waiting to be developed.

==== Partick Thistle Football Club: Then and Now ====
Between 6 March 2019 and 27 September 2019 the museum hosted an exhibition pertaining to the history of Partick Thistle Football Club. The exhibition was curated by Heritage Manager, Nicola McHendry, in partnership with the club. Partick Thistle Football club was founded in 1876 and has been based in Maryhill since 1908. Their nickname is 'The Jags', and they are based in Firhill Stadium in Maryhill.

==== A Flag for Maryhill ====
A competition was launched on 31 August 2020 that involved inviting individuals, local community groups and local schools to create proposals for a community flag. Amongst the reasons for setting up this competition, named 'A Flag for Maryhill', was to bring the community together to reflect on Maryhill's history and look to the future, and to create a symbol which would represent Maryhill’s pride as being a part of Glasgow with its own unique sense of character. The entries were submitted to an assessment panel which included representatives from the Flag Institute, the Lyon Court (a court of law that regulates heraldry in Scotland) and a special celebrity guest judge, Scottish actress, Jane McCarry. The panel narrowed the selection down to 5 top designs. From these 5 entries the public voted for their favourite design either by social media or in-person at the Burgh Halls. Voting opened on 5 July 2021 and closed 17 August 2021. The top designs were revealed on 4 July 2021 across the Burgh Halls' social media accounts. The winning flag was revealed at a community event street party on 2 October 2021.

Maryhill flag

==== The Way We Were ====
Between 1 September 2020 and 18 September 2020 the museum hosted an exhibition consisting of black and white photographs by the Glaswegian photographer Morton Gillespie. This exhibition depicted the social history of 1960’s Glasgow.

==== Glasgow Photo Journey 1978 ====
Between 12 July 2021 and 26 December 2021 the museum hosted an exhibition of black and white photographs by the Manchester based photographer Jos Treen. The exhibition consisted of a selection of photographs taken around the streets of Glasgow in 1978 by Jos Treen during the year in which he was living there. The collection of hundreds of photographs lay forgotten for forty years before they were rediscovered. A selection of the photographs were posted on his social media feeds previous to Jos' exhibition in Maryhill Burgh Halls.

==== Loving Earth Textile Panels ====
Between 18 September 2021 and 15 November 2021 the museum hosted an exhibition consisting of a selection of textile panels produced by members of the public for The Loving Earth Project. The Loving Earth Project invited members of the public to submit 30 cm x 30 cm textile panels that depict themes pertaining to the effects of environmental degradation, contribution of one's own lifestyle to the degradation, and measures that can be taken to address it. The exhibition was timed to coincide with the weeks leading up to and including the COP26 climate conference that took place in Glasgow between 31 October 2021 and 13 November 2021.

==== Jo Sunshine Art ====
A selection of drawings by the visually impaired Glasgow based artist Jo Sunshine have been on display in the museum since Autumn 2021. Jo was left completely blind in her left eye and with a misty blur in her right eye after being involved in a car accident. Subsequently, she draws everything large and in bold colours.

==== Glasgow Orchestral Society ====
From the 29 November 2021 to the 25 March 2022, the museum hosted an exhibition consisting of artefacts pertaining to the history of the Glasgow Orchestral Society. The Glasgow Orchestral Society was formed on the 29 December 1870 (it was initially called the Glasgow Amateur Orchestral Society). They have used Maryhill Burgh Halls as a venue for their weekly rehearsals since October 2011.

==== Ghost Signs of Glasgow ====
Between the 6 April 2022 and the 1 July 2022, the museum hosted an exhibition consisting of pictures and accompanying stories of ghost signs found on buildings in Glasgow. A ghost sign on a building is an old hand painted sign that has lasted to the modern day.

==== 50 Pots ====
From 8 July 2022 until 31 November 2022 the museum hosted an exhibition by the Scottish Pottery Society called 50 Pots. The subject matter of 50 Pots is the 200 year history of the Scottish pottery manufacturing industry including its workers, places, and products. The history of the Scottish pottery industry begins with the establishment of the Delftfield pottery on the banks of the Clyde and ends with the closure of the Govancroft pottery in the 80s. The exhibition has on display surviving examples of products manufactured by the Scottish pottery industry as well as contemporary pieces produced by applied arts students at Glasgow City College in response to the industry's heritage.

==== Maryhill is Wonderful ====
From 11 November 2022 until 15 April 2023 the museum hosted an exhibition titled Maryhill is Wonderful. This exhibition showcased black and white photographs of people who live, work, or volunteer in Maryhill that were taken by the photographer Campbell Ramage during the COVID lockdowns.

==== Strike! Stories of Bryant and May ====
From 30 May 2023 until 12 September 2023 the museum hosted an exhibition about the match manufacturer Bryant and May that produced famous brands such as Scottish Bluebell and Swan Vestas. Bryant and May was a major employer in the local area. The exhibition collects stories from former employees of the local factory, and presents stories relating to the company from wider afield such as the story of the 1888 matchgirls' strike. The telling of such is aided by the artistic responses of Wyndford-based artist Rabia Saleem.

==== How did the Garden Grow? ====
From 18 to 29 September 2023 the museum hosted an exhibition about the 1988 Glasgow Garden Festival in order to celebrate its 35th anniversary. The exhibition was hosted in collaboration with the New Glasgow Society, After the Garden Festival, and Glasgow Urban Lab (a research centre in the Glasgow School of Art). Visitors were encouraged to share their thoughts in the interactive gallery installation as well as browse through the archival exhibits.

==== A Stone, A Spark, A Shard of Glass ====
From 14 October 2023 until 27 January 2024 the museum hosted an exhibition of works by 12 members of the G20 Artist Collective. Each word in the title of the exhibition relates to an element of the research carried out by members of the G20 Artist Collective around the collection of Maryhill Museum and the surrounding area. Stones, sparks, matches, glass, illuminous floating waterways, concrete, madder dye, liminal spaces, stairs and rails were just some of the things the artists looked at and saw anew while creating work specifically to be shown in the exhibition. The G20 Artist Collective is made up of contemporary artists based within the G20 postcode area. It was established in January 2022 following two years of lockdowns, online shows, and solo studio working.

==== The George Ward Collection ====
From 3 February 2024 until 11 May 2024 the museum will host an exhibition of photographs and film footage of 1970s Maryhill taken by George Ward. George Ward was born and brought up in Maryhill. The exhibition also includes a lamp post and other pieces of street furniture that George salvaged from depots and skips.

== Maryhill Burgh Halls Café ==
The Maryhill Burgh Halls café is called 'The Nolly'. The café name, which was chosen through a public vote, was one of many suggested by members of the local community before the café was re-opened after being shut down due to COVID-19. 'Nolly' is a local term of affection for the Forth & Clyde Canal, which flows behind the building.

== See also ==
- List of listed buildings in Glasgow/8
