= Scottish Youth Theatre =

Arts organisation in Scotland, UK

Scottish Youth Theatre is a national young artists' development organisation. It designs projects that offer artistic development opportunities for aspiring and early career artists, age 14 to 25. The company was established in 1976 and has a free-to-participate National Artistic Programme for young people who are based in Scotland and interested in creating theatre. It strives to broaden young people's artistic experiences, introducing them to a range of art forms and creatives in the industry. The programme is crafted around young people's needs, adopting a variety of physical and digital platforms to produce small-scale engagement projects, festivals, full-scale productions and national tours.

Scottish Youth Theatre is a remote-working organisation, delivering in-person projects throughout Scotland.

== History ==
Scottish Youth Theatre started in Edinburgh on 6 December 1976 and held its inaugural Summer Festival in 1977. The company's first production was 'Oh What a Lovely Peace' performed at Moray House Theatre in Edinburgh, written by Hector MacMillan and directed by Denise Coffey. The company was then incorporated on 28 March 1978.

The company has occupied various homes in its history, including the Old Athenaeum in Buchanan Street, Glasgow and The Old Sheriff Court on Brunswick Street, Glasgow as part of the redevelopment of that building, opening in 2005. In 2023, Scottish Youth Theatre became a remote working organisation, delivering in-person projects across Scotland.

Past Artistic Directors include Gareth Wardell, Robin Peoples and Mary McCluskey, who held the role for 26 years from 1992 to 2018. The years 2000-2018 saw the company fall into decline under poor management and a high turnover of core staff. With a change in structure, Jacky Hardacre became Chief Executive in 2016 and Mahri Reilly took artistic lead as Creative Director from 2018 to 2022. She was succeeded by Rikki Payne in November 2022.

Following a decision by Creative Scotland to end its funding, the theatre announced it would cease trading in July 2018. Scottish Youth Theatre was then saved by a decision by the Scottish Government to fund it directly, and by extensive private sponsorship and donations.

Alumni of Scottish Youth Theatre include Andrew Still, Brian Ferguson, Gerard Butler, Jack Lowden, Jamie Parker, Gayle Rankin, Karen Gillan, Kate Dickie, KT Tunstall, Laura Fraser, Michelle Gomez and Tony Curran.

== Patrons ==
Patrons of Scottish Youth Theatre include:

- Brian Cox (after whom the Brian Cox Theatre within the Old Sheriff Court building is named)
- Alan Cumming
- Blythe Duff
- Phyllida Law
- Liz Lochhead
- Colin McCredie
- John Michie
- Bill Paterson
- Paul Riley
- David Rintoul
- Elaine C Smith
- Emma Thompson
- Richard Wilson

== Past Productions & Projects ==
- Shapeshift Aberdeen (2023)
- Amplify (2023)
- Encounters (2023)
- Stories & Spaces (2023)
- textLAB (2022)
- Trajectories (2022)
- Phone Call to the World (2021)
- RESURGENCE (2021)
- Making Space Digital Festival (2021)
- Now You See Me: Younger Seeds (2020)
- Drip//Slick//Spill (National Ensemble 2020)
- Quaranteen (2020)
- 2020 Stories (2020)
- Once You See the Smoke (National Ensemble 2020)
- Now You See Me (2019)
- Elevate (2019)
- Act of Repair (National Ensemble 2019)
- S'no Snow (2018)
- VENT (National Ensemble 2018)
- Tell Us Who We Are (with YDance, NYOS & NYCOS) (2018)
- Tommy and the Snowbird (2017)
- Dye in the Goldfish Bowl (National Ensemble 2017)
- Starlight Starbright (2016)
- The Tempest (Summer 2016)
- forbiDden (Summer 2016)
- Thebans (Summer 2015)
- Collateral Damage (Summer 2015)
- Whose Shoes? (2015)
- Tin Forest (with National Theatre of Scotland) (2014)
- Freckleface Strawberry (2014)
- Wild Heather (2014)
- Jason & the Argonauts (2014)
- Now's the Hour (2013 & 2014)
- Mary Queen of Scots Got Her Head Chopped Off (Summer 2013)
- Killing Me Softly (2013)
- The Sky is Falling (2013)
- Frida & Frosty (2013)
- Twelfth Night (2012)
- A Midsummer Night's Dream (2012)
- It Wasn't Me, It Was Goldilocks (2012)
- Oh Crumbs, Scary Biscuits (2012)
- You Can't Catch Me (2012)
- Prom Night of the Living Dead (Summer 2011)
- Born Bad (Summer 2011)
- The Princess and the Pea (2011)
- That's Not My Name (2011)
- Sawney Bean (2011)
- Charlie and the Chocolate Factory (2011)
- The Court of Miracles (Summer 2010)
- Jerusalem – The Songs of Deeds (2010)
- Adventures in a Norwegian Wood (2010)
- The Ugly Duckling (2010)
- Wee Red (2010)
- The Puddock and the Princess (2010)
- Pinocchio (2009)
- Hidden Treasures (2009)
- Hamlet (2009)
- Tam o' Shanter (2009)
- Geordie (Summer 2008)
- Oh! What A Lovely War (Summer 2008)
- Hero (Summer 2008)
- When A Star Falls (2007–2008)
- His Dark Materials (Philip Pullman Trilogy) (2007)
- Wee MacGreegor (2006)
- Man of the Crowd (2006)
- Tales From The Arabian Nights (2006)
- Geordie (2006)
- The Snow Queen (2005)
- The Ugly Ducking (2005)
- Into The Light (2005)
- Dying For It (2004–2005)
- The Lion, The Witch, and the Wardrobe (2004)
- Sweeney Todd: The Demon Barber of Fleet Street (2004)
- Fairy Tale (2004)
- Romeo and Juliet (2003)
- Our Town (2003)
- Haroun and the Sea of Stories (2003)
- Walking Shadows (2003)
- The Boyfriend (2002)
- Merlin – The Wild Boy (2002)
- Born Bad (2001)
- The Wizard of Oz (2001)
- Hamlet (2000)
- Macbeth (2000)
- The Threepenny Opera (1992) (Dundee Rep)
- Tam o' Shanter (1991) (The People's Palace)
- Nicholas Nickleby (1991) (The Old Athenaeum)
- The Human Cannon (1990) (The Old Athenaeum)
- A Midsummer Night's Dream (1990) (The Burrell Collection)
- The Dragon (1988) (Aberdeen University)
- Romeo and Juliet (1988) (RSAMD Theatre)
- Oh What a Lovely Peace (1977)
