= Corinthian Club =

County building in Glasgow, Scotland

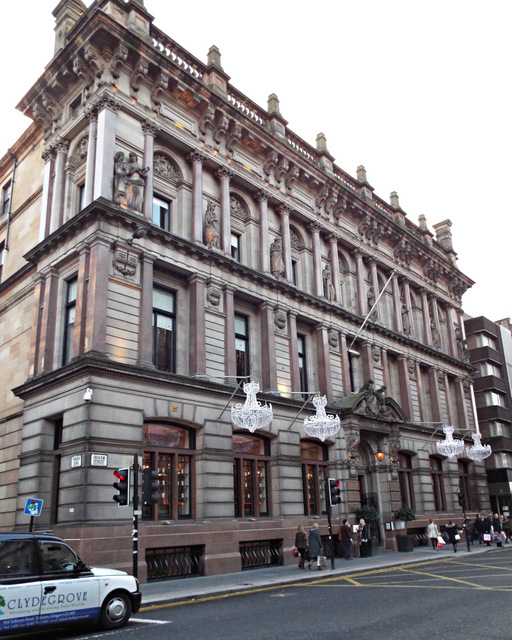
- Corinthian Club

- Shown in Glasgow
- 55.8597°N 4.2496°W
- Location: Ingram Street, Glasgow

History
- Built: 1752

Site notes
- Architect: David Hamilton
- Architectural style: Mannerist style
- Owner: King City Leisure

Listed Building – Category A
- Official name: Corinthian Club (former Sheriff Court and Justice of the Peace Court), 191 Ingram Street, Glasgow
- Designated: 15 December 1970
- Reference no.: LB32735

The Corinthian Club is a private members club in Ingram Street, Glasgow, Scotland. It is accommodated in former bank building which, as Lanarkshire House, became the headquarters of Lanarkshire County Council. It is a Category A listed building.

== History ==
The original building on the site was a house known as Virginia Mansion which was commissioned by the Glasgow tobacco merchant, George Buchanan of Mount Vernon, and was completed in 1752. It was acquired by Alexander Spiers of Elderslie in 1770 and then, after passing through the hands of several other wealthy merchants, it was bought and remodelled to serve as the headquarters of the Glasgow and Ship Bank, which had previously been based in Virginia Street.

The remodelling was carried out to a design by David Hamilton in the Mannerist style using ashlar stone and was completed in 1842. The design involved a symmetrical main frontage with seven bays facing onto Ingram Street. In 1843, the Glasgow and Ship Bank merged with the Union Bank of Scotland and the building then became the headquarters of the merged bank.

The building was altered internally to create a telling room to a design by James Salmon in 1853 and then re-fronted to a design by John Burnet between 1876 and 1879. The re-fronting involved the construction of a central porch with a heavy brackets supporting an entablature and an open segmental pediment containing a coat of arms; it also involved a row of segmental windows on the ground floor, a Doric order pilastrade enclosing deeply recessed casement windows on the first floor and a Corinthian order colonnade enclosing a series of round headed windows on the second floor. The windows on the second floor contained fine carvings in the tympana and were flanked by figures sculptured by John Mossman. Internally, the principal rooms were the telling room, which featured an elaborate coved ceiling, the bullion room, which featured a barrel vaulted ceiling, and the clerks' room.

After the bank relocated to St Vincent Street in the 1920s, Lanarkshire County Council, which had been based at County Buildings in Wilson Street, moved into the Ingram Street building and renamed it Lanarkshire House in 1930. The former bullion store was converted into a courtroom which was used to create additional capacity for sheriff court hearings. The county council relocated to Lanark County Buildings in Hamilton in 1964, but the building continued to be used as a courthouse until the court service moved out in 1997. The building was then acquired by a developer, King City Leisure, who, in 1999, restored it and converted into a private members club known as the Corinthian Club. When the building re-opened, artistic work on display included a piece of art entitled "Glaschu", which took the form of a planted green line set in the floor of the bullion room to a design by the British artist, Anya Gallaccio.

== See also ==
- List of listed buildings in Glasgow/8
- List of Category A listed buildings in Glasgow
