= Thomas Richardson (cartographer) =

18th-century Scottish cartographer

Thomas Richardson was a Scottish cartographer in the 18th century. He is recorded as having been active from 1772–1828.

Maps, plans and surveys attributed to Richardson include the 1771 'reduced map' of Blenheim Park, which gives Richardson's address as Little Queen Ann Street, Cavendish Square, London; a 1771 "Survey of the Royal Gardens of Richmond", a 1772 plan of Maidenstone Hill, Greenwich, 1775 plans of Little St John's Wood, 1776 plans of the crown estates in Minster in Sheppey and a 1777 survey of the lands of the Duchess of Buccleuch.

The National Library of Scotland holds four maps by Richardson, who signs them as a 'landsurveyor, Glasgow'. These include a map of the town of Glasgow from 1795, and a new travelling map of Scotland 'shewing principal direct & cross roads', 1804.
