= Newlandsmuir =

Coordinates: 55°44′55″N 4°12′59″W

Newlandsmuir is an area of the Scottish new town East Kilbride, in South Lanarkshire.

It is a relatively modern residential development in the southern half of the town, separating Greenhills from Mossneuk.

Its name comes from the former Newlandsmuir Farm, which was demolished during the summer of 2006 after permission was granted for a housing development. The stables and riding school operated at the farm have now moved to Sandford near Strathaven.

The area is approximately half a kilometre in diameter, and sits near the town border to the south west.
