= North Medwyn River =

River in South Lanarkshire, Scotland

Coordinates: 55.7075°N 3.5702°W

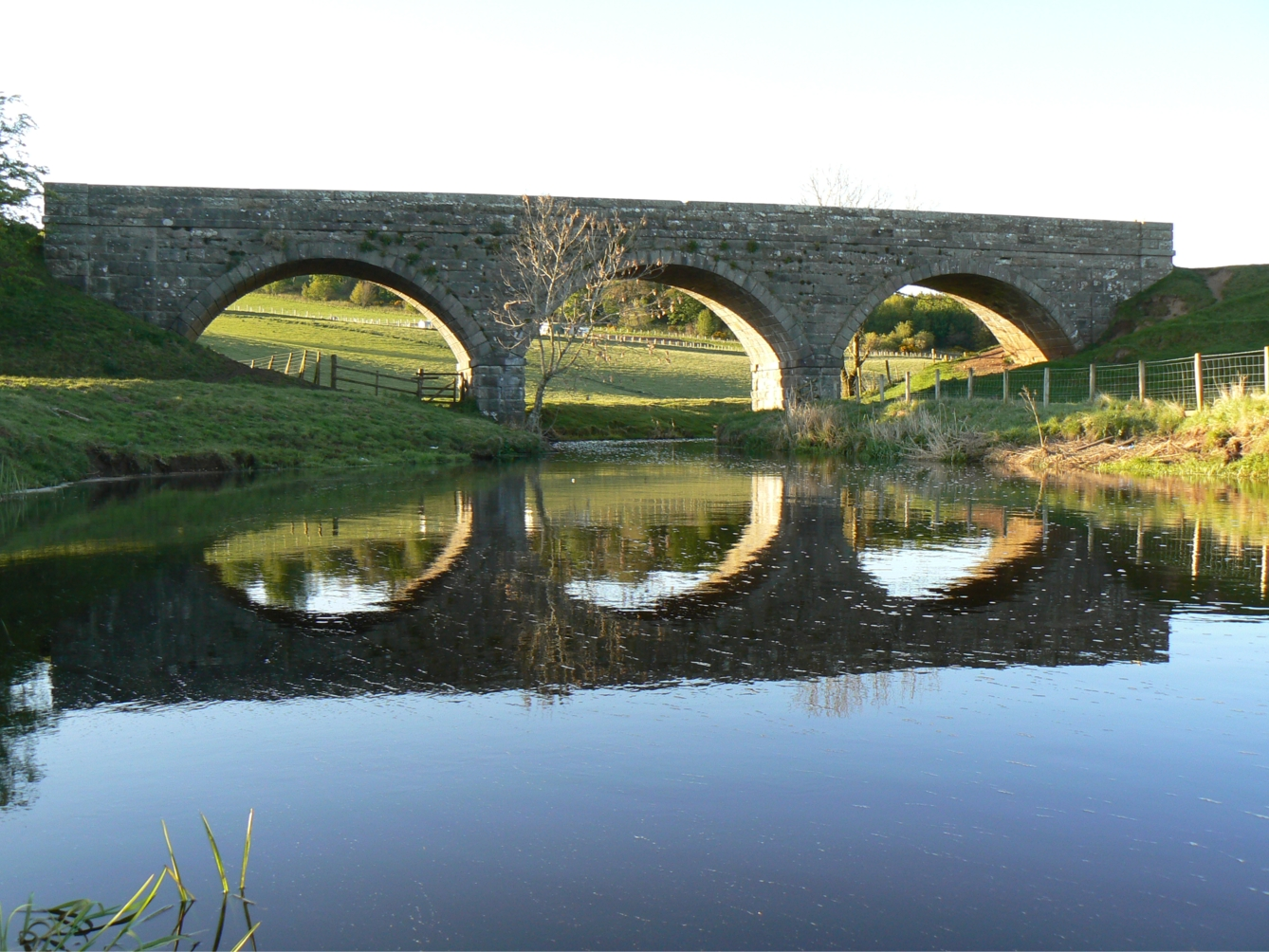
Three Arched Bridge

North Medwyn is a river in the Lanarkshire region of Scotland. Along with the confluence of the South Medwyn River it forms the Medwyn water basin. The North Medwyn is a tributary of the River Clyde.
