= South Medwin River =

Tributary of River Clyde, Scotland

Coordinates: 55.68475°N 3.60334°W

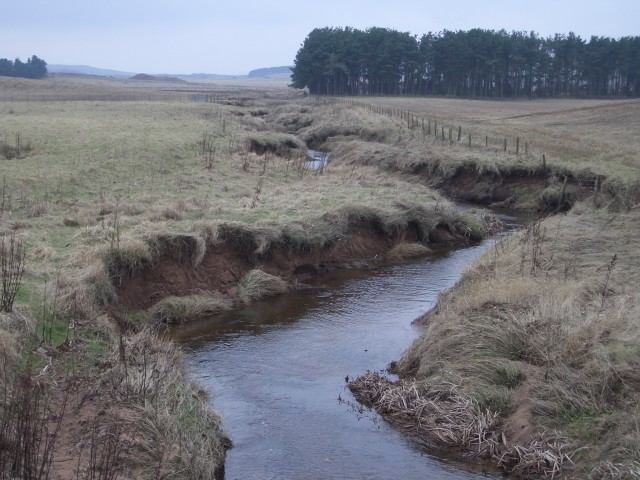
South Medwin river, looking southwest from the road bridge

South Medwin, sometimes spelled Medwyn, is a river in the Lanarkshire region of Scotland. Along with the confluence of the North Medwin River it forms the Medwin water basin. The South Medwin flows westward to join the River Clyde a mile (1.5 km) south of Carnwath at a point called "The Meeting".
