= Wilson Street, Glasgow =

Street in Glasgow, Scotland

Coordinates: 55°51′31.2″N 4°14′53.4″W

Wilson Street
- Interactive map of Wilson Street
- Type: Commercial
- Maintained by: Glasgow City Council
- Length: 0.064 mi (0.103 km)
- Location: Glasgow
- Postal code: G1
- Nearest Glasgow Subway station: St. Enoch's

Wilson Street is a thoroughfare in Glasgow, the largest city in Scotland. The street runs east from Virginia Street through the Merchant City until it meets Candleriggs.

== History ==
The street was opened in 1790 and was, along with Brunswick Street, John Street and Hutcheson Street, part of Glasgow's second 'new town'.

It was named after George Wilson, a Glasgow merchant, who founded Wilson's School, to the north of the Trongate. Wilson died in London in 1778.
