= Mossneuk =

Suburb of East Kilbride, Scotland

Coordinates: 55°45′05″N 4°13′26″W

Mossneuk is predominantly a residential suburb situated in the south-western area of the Scottish new town East Kilbride, South Lanarkshire. It takes its name from the former Mossneuk farm, the buildings of which stood near the suburb's north-eastern corner.

Mossneuk has very few facilities within it, principally because it was designed as a suburb instead of a self-contained neighbourhood. It is served, however, by more distantly located shops, facilities and conveniences at the nearby neighbourhood centres of Greenhills and Hairmyres.

The preconceived zone of Mossneuk 'proper' technically incorporates the suburban area of Gardenhall, although the latter has long been regarded by its residents as a distinct suburb separated from Mossneuk by Greenhills Road, although perception of the boundary varies to some extent.. As a whole, the area is directly served by a single public house called (The Gardenhall Inn), located at Gardenhall (streetname), as well as a mini-market type shop and hairdressing salon at Severn Road. A Mossneuk Church and Primary School are situated adjacent to the latter, and a multi-use community space also operated within the said school. This replaces an earlier community hall beside the local shops. Mossneuk also benefits from a large area of greenspace wilderness known locally originally as Mossneuk Recreation Area, colloquially as 'The Misties', and more recently with increasing formality as Mossneuk Urban Greenspace LNR. This area incorporates the woodlands and bog woodlands of Blackwood and Blackmoss to the north.

As stated, Mossneuk is the site of one of South Lanarkshire's 124 primary schools, Mossneuk Primary School. As of 2011/2012, the school roll is approximately 450.

One of the town's nine Church of Scotland churches is Mossneuk Parish Church. The church is one of several Eco-Congregations in South Lanarkshire and the associate minister, Rev. George Sneddon is also the Chaplain to Mossneuk Primary School. The church hosts the 7th East Kilbride Girls' Brigade and 11th East Kilbride Boys' Brigade.

The area gained some prominence following the murder, within part of the greenspace, of 16-year-old local schoolboy Jack Frew, in May 2010.
