= List of gangs in Glasgow =

The following list of gangs was published in the Glasgow Evening Times in February 2006 as identified by Strathclyde Police with the accompanying map.

The city was divided into North Glasgow, South Glasgow and East Glasgow. East Glasgow had the most identified gangs with 41 followed by South Glasgow with 38 and North Glasgow with 31. The districts with the overall greatest number of gangs were Greater Pollok with 11, Govan with 10 and Drumchapel with 9.

== North and west Glasgow ==
Drumchapel

- Y. Peel Glen Team (correctly: Peel Glen Boys)
- Y. Hull Team Derry
- Y. Linkwood Mad Squad
- Southdeen Young Team
- Young Cloan Mad Squad
- Y. Bellway Fleeto
- Jedworth Young Team
- Y. Dardie P (Young Skitzo Dardie / Dardie Boyz)
- Y. Essenside Fleeto

West Clydeside

- Yoker Langy
- Yoker Toi
- Y. Whiteinch Bowrie
- Y. Scotstoun Fleet
- Finnieston
- Anderston Young Team

Knightswood

- Y. Kwood Fleeto

Maryhill

- Y. Trossachs Street
- Valley Young Team
- Y. Maryhill Fleeto
- Y. Queens Cross
- Y. Georges Cross

Cadder & Summerston

- Cadder Young Team
- Y. Skitzo Lyndale

Milton and Possil

- Westray Boyz
- Backend Boyz
- Y. Milton Tongs
- Y. Ruchill Boyz
- Y. Posso Fleeto
- Keppochhill Gang

West End

- Y. Partick Fleeto
- Hillhead Young Team

Sighthill / Townhead

- Y. Sighthill Mafia
- Young Toon Toi

North East

- Y. Springburn Peg
- Y. Tiny Gringo
- Auchinairn Young Team
- Young Blackhill Toi
- Royston Catholic Shamrock
- Riddrie Loyal
- Young Germiston

== South Glasgow ==
Govan

- Y. Govan Team
- Y. Linthouse Goucho
- Drumoyne Young Team
- Y. Crosse Posse
- Y. Kimbo Kills
- Teucharhill Young Team
- Young Young Winey
- Ibrox Tongs
- Kinning Park Derry
- Craigton Goucho

Gorbals

- Y. Sooside Cumbie
- Y. Crossie Cumbie
- Hutchie Boyz

Greater Pollok

- Y. Pollok Kross
- Y. Crookie Possie
- Pollok Young Team
- Y. Pollok Bushwackers
- Housy Mad Sqwad
- Y. Nitsie Fleeto
- Y. Southie
- Parkhouse
- Y. Tiny Priesty
- Arden Young Toon
- Darnley Mad Squad

South West

- Y. Penilee Pen
- Hillington Young Team
- Mossy Derry
- Mossy Young Team

Southside

- Y. Shaws Team
- Govanhill Young Team
- Young Shields Mad Sqwad
- Toryglen Toi
- Battlefield Young Team

Castlemilk

- Y. Castlemilk Valley
- Y. Castlemilk Tay
- Castlemilk Young Craig
- Y. Holmbyre Fleet
- Carmunnock Young Team

== East Glasgow ==
Inner East End

- Duke Street Fleet
- Haghill Powery
- Real Calton Tongs
- Monks Dennistoun
- Gallowgate Mad Squad

Bridgeton & Dalmarnock

- Y. Bridgeton Derry
- Y. White Scheme Derry
- Reid Street Dickies
- Reid Street Derry
- Baltic Fleet

Parkhead / Shettleston / Tollcross

- Y. Parkhead Border
- Y. Parkhead Rebels
- Y. Shettleston Tigers
- Tollcross Wee Men

East End

- The Fullarton
- Y. Carmyle Tahiti
- The Vulgar
- The Mounty

Easterhouse

- The Drummy
- Young Den-Toi
- Skinheads
- Aggro
- Bal-Toi
- Provvy

Edinburgh Road

- Bar-L
- Young Calvay
- The Boig
- Young Torran Toi
- The Easthall
- Young Carntyne Goucho
- High Tyne
- Young Cranhill Fleeto

Ruchazie / Garthamlock

- Coby
- Young High End Ziggy Fleet
- Low End
- GYTO
- Craigend

== Further information ==
- Glasgow Gangs

== See also ==
- Glasgow razor gangs
