= 1999 Glasgow City Council election =

1999 Scottish local government election

- 6 May 1999

All 79 seats to Glasgow City Council 40 seats needed for a majority
- Turnout: 47.0%
	First party	Second party	Third party
Party	Labour	SNP	Conservative
Last election	77 seats, 61.5%	1 seat, 22.8%	3 seats, 6.6%
Seats won	74	2	1
Seat change	▼3	▲1	▼2
Popular vote	114,851	68,681	17,186
Percentage	49.6%	29.7%	7.4%
Swing	▼11.9%	▲6.9%	▲0.8%
	Fourth party	Fifth party
Party	Scottish Socialist	Liberal Democrats
Last election	Did not contest	1 seat, 3.4%
Seats won	1	1
Seat change	▲1	Steady
Popular vote	16,936	13,006
Percentage	7.3%	5.6%
Swing	New	▲2.2%
- Colours indicate winners in each ward Labour Liberal Democrat SNP Independent Conservative Scottish Socialist Party
Council Leader before election
Scottish Labour Party
Council Leader after election
Scottish Labour Party

Elections to Glasgow City Council were held on 6 May 1999, the same day as the other Scottish local government elections.

== Results ==
1999 Glasgow City Council election result
Party	Seats	Gains	Losses	Net gain/loss	Seats %	Votes %	Votes	+/−
Labour	74			▼3	93.7	49.6	114,851	▼11.9
SNP	2			▲1	2.5	29.7	68,681	▲6.9
Conservative	1			▼2	1.3	7.4	17,186	▲0.8
Scottish Socialist	1			▲1	1.3	7.3	16,936	New
Liberal Democrats	1			Steady	1.3	5.6	13,006	▲2.2
Humanist	0	0	0	Steady	0.0	0.1	321	New
Scottish Unionist	0	0	0	Steady	0.0	0.1	225	New
Liberal	0	0	0	Steady	0.0	0.1	151	New
Socialist Labour	0	0	0	Steady	0.0	0.1	95	New
Scottish Unity Party	0	0	0	Steady	0.0	0.1	62	New

== Ward results ==
Ward 1: Drumry
Party	Candidate	Votes	%
Labour	M O'Neill	1,209	59.7
SNP	N Dolan	478	23.6
Scottish Socialist	M Benson	235	11.6
Conservative	C Jardine	102	5.0
Majority		731	
Turnout			36.2
Labour win (new seat)			

Ward 2: Summerhill
Party	Candidate	Votes	%
Labour	M Lee	1,243	58.7
SNP	L D Gibson	543	25.6
Scottish Socialist	A Lynch	331	15.6
Majority		700	
Turnout			33.9
Labour win (new seat)			

Ward 3: Blairdardie
Party	Candidate	Votes	%
Labour	S J Purcell	2,146	59.4
SNP	R Shaw	913	25.3
Conservative	A E Swanson	331	9.2
Scottish Socialist	D Burns	172	4.8
Humanist	A Nicolson	52	1.4
Majority		1,233	
Turnout			57.6
Labour win (new seat)			

Ward 4: Knightswood Park
Party	Candidate	Votes	%
Labour	C Gordon	2,275	63.8
SNP	M Bashir	892	25.0
Conservative	G Dickson	398	11.2
Majority		1,383	
Turnout			56.7
Labour win (new seat)			

Ward 5: Knightswood South
Party	Candidate	Votes	%
Labour	E A Cameron	2,085	62.1
SNP	L L Harper	1,006	30.0
Conservative	S M Watson	264	7.9
Majority		1,079	
Turnout			53.7
Labour win (new seat)			

Ward 6: Yoker
Party	Candidate	Votes	%
Labour	C Roberton	1,903	63.7
SNP	M J Walker	928	31.0
Conservative	M G Taylor	158	5.3
Majority		975	
Turnout			46.3
Labour win (new seat)			

Ward 7: Anniesland
Party	Candidate	Votes	%
Labour	C L Kelly	1,598	46.6
SNP	R W Scott	955	27.8
Conservative	G Cornes	400	11.7
Liberal Democrats	M Watt	334	9.7
Scottish Socialist	S Chaldean	143	4.2
Majority		975	
Turnout			53.7
Labour win (new seat)			

Ward 8: Jordanhill
Party	Candidate	Votes	%
Liberal Democrats	C Mason	1,638	39.6
Labour	L Howitt	889	21.5
Conservative	G D Bache	848	20.5
SNP	C M MacKellar	674	16.3
Scottish Socialist	D Anderson	86	2.1
Majority		749	
Turnout			65.4
Liberal Democrats win (new seat)			

Ward 9: Kelvindale
Party	Candidate	Votes	%
Labour	C Renton	1,101	30.5
Liberal Democrats	M Paris	1,006	27.8
Conservative	W M Roxburgh	884	24.5
SNP	D Camshron (?)	624	17.3
Majority		95	
Turnout			58.4
Labour gain from			

Ward 10: Scotstoun
Party	Candidate	Votes	%
Labour	J McFadden	1,696	49.9
SNP	E W Quinn	913	26.8
Liberal Democrats	L J Clarke	334	9.8
Scottish Socialist	P Campbell	241	7.1
Conservative	C G Trotman	218	6.4
Majority		783	
Turnout			51.6
Labour win (new seat)			

Ward 11: Victoria Park
Party	Candidate	Votes	%
Labour	I Graham	1,460	39.5
SNP	G Douglas	881	23.8
Liberal Democrats	M J Hook	517	14.0
Conservative	M T Smith	461	12.5
Scottish Socialist	H Ritchie	380	10.3
Majority		579	
Turnout			56.8
Labour win (new seat)			

Ward 12: Hayburn
Party	Candidate	Votes	%
Labour	E Fitzgerald	1,441	41.7
SNP	F A Rankin	1,059	30.7
Liberal Democrats	F Mildmay	380	11.0
Scottish Socialist	A Green	290	7.1
Conservative	E C Wykes	282	8.2
Majority		382	
Turnout			51.4
Labour win (new seat)			

Ward 13: Hyndland
Party	Candidate	Votes	%
Labour	R Simpson	1,177	32.6
SNP	G MacIntyre-Kemp	1,001	27.8
Liberal Democrats	J E Hewit	726	20.1
Conservative	A Brocklehurst	551	15.3
Scottish Socialist	D Fraser	152	4.2
Majority		176	
Turnout			52.0
Labour win (new seat)			

Ward 14: Hillhead
Party	Candidate	Votes	%
Labour	K Burns	890	33.9
SNP	G Thoms	739	28.1
Liberal Democrats	T Mayberry	551	21.0
Conservative	M Walker	243	9.2
Scottish Socialist	H Brown	206	7.8
Majority		151	
Turnout			36.4
Labour win (new seat)			

Ward 15: Partick
Party	Candidate	Votes	%
Labour	A Colleran	1,378	41.1
SNP	K McLean	1,160	34.6
Liberal Democrats	A C Faure	540	16.1
Conservative	L D Jamieson	272	8.1
Majority		218	
Turnout			50.1
Labour win (new seat)			

Ward 16: Kelvingrove
Party	Candidate	Votes	%
Labour	M Green	1,309	47.7
SNP	S Roberts	747	27.2
Conservative	R G Wolseley	483	17.6
Scottish Socialist	W Tallan	204	7.4
Majority		562	
Turnout			37.3
Labour win (new seat)			

Ward 17: Anderston
Party	Candidate	Votes	%
Labour	A Mosson	1,235	51.0
SNP	P D Johnson	609	25.2
Liberal Democrats	K Philbrick	251	10.4
Scottish Socialist	D Stevenson	177	7.3
Conservative	C Botfield	149	6.2
Majority		626	
Turnout			37.5
Labour win (new seat)			

Ward 18: Woodlands
Party	Candidate	Votes	%
Labour	H Malik	1,145	43.8
SNP	A Khan	736	28.1
Liberal Democrats	W Craig	566	21.6
Humanist	A D Williams	169	6.5
Majority		409	
Turnout			36.7
Labour win (new seat)			

Ward 19: North Kelvin
Party	Candidate	Votes	%
Labour	J MacKechnie	1,104	36.6
SNP	F McMaster	950	31.5
Liberal Democrats	J Stuart	486	16.1
Conservative	P Miller	226	7.5
Scottish Socialist	J Lawson	219	7.3
Humanist	W Khan	33	1.1
Majority		154	
Turnout			43.9
Labour win (new seat)			

Ward 15: Wyndford
Party	Candidate	Votes	%
Labour	R Gray	1,219	42.6
SNP	W McAllister	1,099	38.4
Liberal Democrats	R A Rodger	214	16.1
Scottish Socialist	I F Beaton	210	7.3
Conservative	J Holst	119	4.2
Majority		120	
Turnout			43.4
Labour win (new seat)			

Ward 21: Maryhill
Party	Candidate	Votes	%
Labour	F Dingwall	1,182	47.5
SNP	A Fraser	905	36.4
Liberal Democrats	M J Jackson	207	8.3
Scottish Socialist	A Lewis	194	7.8
Majority		277	
Turnout			40.9
Labour win (new seat)			

Ward 22: Summerston
Party	Candidate	Votes	%
Labour	R Winter	1,543	51.6
SNP	M MacDonald	913	30.6
Liberal Democrats	T J Thompson	339	11.3
Scottish Socialist	G Scott	193	6.5
Majority		630	
Turnout			49.3
Labour win (new seat)			

Ward 23: Milton
Party	Candidate	Votes	%
Labour	M Sinclair	1,400	53.3
SNP	J Kerr	1,228	46.7
Majority		172	
Turnout			42.8
Labour win (new seat)			

Ward 24: Ashfield
Party	Candidate	Votes	%
Labour	E Hurcombe	1,439	55.5
SNP	G Roberts	995	38.3
Scottish Socialist	J Gallagher	161	6.2
Majority		444	
Turnout			41.8
Labour win (new seat)			

Ward 25: Firhill
Party	Candidate	Votes	%
Labour	B A Maan	1,036	37.8
SNP	J A Park	873	31.9
Liberal Democrats	E Shephard	406	14.8
Scottish Socialist	P Byme	212	7.7
Conservative	L M Clark	212	7.7
Majority		163	
Turnout			40.8
Labour win (new seat)			

Ward 26: Keppochhill
Party	Candidate	Votes	%
Labour	J Gray	1,208	62.1
SNP	S Bell	576	29.6
Scottish Socialist	Frances Curran	182	8.3
Majority		632	
Turnout			31.0
Labour win (new seat)			

Ward 27: Merchant City
Party	Candidate	Votes	%
Labour	G Matheson	1,297	52.8
SNP	G A Roberts	665	27.1
Liberal Democrats	W J Money	320	13.0
Scottish Socialist	P J Murray	176	7.2
Majority		632	
Turnout			39.5
Labour win (new seat)			

Ward 28: Royston
Party	Candidate	Votes	%
Labour	J Moynes	1,464	65.2
SNP	M Coyle	528	23.5
Scottish Socialist	J Wallis	253	11.3
Majority		936	
Turnout			33.4
Labour win (new seat)			

Ward 29: Cowlairs
Party	Candidate	Votes	%
Labour	A Stewart	1,208	55.8
SNP	W McLaren	672	31.0
Scottish Socialist	G Cairns	146	6.7
Conservative	L A MacLaughlin	140	6.5
Majority		536	
Turnout			34.9
Labour win (new seat)			

Ward 30: Springburn
Party	Candidate	Votes	%
Labour	R Davey	1,856	64.5
SNP	R Quinn	788	27.4
Conservative	C A Brown	197	6.8
Humanist	P J Dillon	37	1.3
Majority		1,068	
Turnout			47.4
Labour win (new seat)			

Ward 31: Wallacewell
Party	Candidate	Votes	%
Labour	M Beckett	1,865	65.7
SNP	J Sweeney	739	26.0
Scottish Socialist	J Twaddale	233	8.2
Majority		1,126	
Turnout			45.4
Labour win (new seat)			

Ward 32: Milnbank
Party	Candidate	Votes	%
Labour	E McDougall	1,736	59.8
SNP	J R Brady	902	31.1
Conservative	J McLean	265	9.1
Majority		834	
Turnout			45.2
Labour win (new seat)			

Ward 33: Dennistoun
Party	Candidate	Votes	%
Labour	J P Macey	1,419	49.2
SNP	D Rithchie	985	34.2
Scottish Socialist	D Gilmour	263	9.1
Conservative	A Smith	141	4.9
Scottish Unionist	W McLachlan	75	2.6
Majority		434	
Turnout			45.2
Labour win (new seat)			

Ward 34: Calton
Party	Candidate	Votes	%
Labour	D Stevenson	1,081	52.8
SNP	H O'Hagan	652	31.8
Scottish Socialist	R H Bradford	166	8.1
Scottish Unionist	R Wilkie	150	7.3
Majority		429	
Turnout			34.3
Labour win (new seat)			

Ward 35: Bridgeton/Dalmarnock
Party	Candidate	Votes	%
Labour	G Redmond	1,440	67.1
SNP	J Duncan	513	23.9
Scottish Socialist	K J Hattarn	97	4.5
Socialist Labour	T M Ritchie	95	4.4
Majority		927	
Turnout			34.4
Labour win (new seat)			

Ward 36: Parkhead
Party	Candidate	Votes	%
Labour	E Smith	1,353	64.5
SNP	D McGuiness	576	27.4
Scottish Socialist	M Eyre	170	8.1
Majority		777	
Turnout			34.7
Labour win (new seat)			

Ward 37: Carntyne
Party	Candidate	Votes	%
Labour	P Chalmers	1,526	57.2
SNP	H MacQueen	866	32.4
Conservative	E J Bunting	278	10.4
Majority		660	
Turnout			41.3
Labour win (new seat)			

Ward 38: Robroyston
Party	Candidate	Votes	%
Labour	R Marshall	1,589	64.6
SNP	A J Ritchie	696	28.3
Conservative	M S Thomson	300	10.5
Majority		848	
Turnout			51.3
Labour win (new seat)			

Ward 39: Gartcraig
Party	Candidate	Votes	%
Labour	G R Leonard	1,709	59.5
SNP	J McIntyre	861	30.0
Conservative	R Wilson	300	10.5
Majority		848	
Turnout			51.3
Labour win (new seat)			

Ward 40: Queenslie
Party	Candidate	Votes	%
Labour	G McCann	939	46.4
SNP	M A Hunter	544	26.9
Scottish Socialist	W Anderson	539	26.7
Majority		395	
Turnout			40.8
Labour win (new seat)			

Ward 41: Greenfield
Party	Candidate	Votes	%
Labour	H MacRae	1,727	56.0
SNP	I Smith	1,358	44.0
Majority		369	
Turnout			50.7
Labour win (new seat)			

Ward 42: Barlanark
Party	Candidate	Votes	%
Labour	J Coleman	1,277	60.3
SNP	M L Greene	613	29.0
Scottish Socialist	G Cleland	226	10.7
Majority		664	
Turnout			37.2
Labour win (new seat)			

Ward 43: Shettleston
Party	Candidate	Votes	%
Labour	G Ryan	2.062	65.2
SNP	J Hanif	860	27.2
Scottish Socialist	E Docherty	242	7.6
Majority		1,202	
Turnout			50.4
Labour win (new seat)			

Ward 44: Tollcross Park
Party	Candidate	Votes	%
Labour	W Butler	1,399	56.0
SNP	E McKechnie	746	29.9
Conservative	A Williamson	187	7.5
Scottish Socialist	D Eyre	164	6.6
Majority		653	
Turnout			40.9
Labour win (new seat)			

Ward 45: Braidfauld
Party	Candidate	Votes	%
Labour	S Baird	1,374	61.6
SNP	A Hunter	633	28.4
Scottish Socialist	L O'Brien	222	10.0
Majority		36.6	
Turnout			741
Labour win (new seat)			

Ward 46: Mount Vernon
Party	Candidate	Votes	%
Labour	C McNicol	1,787	46.7
SNP	R A McIntyre	1,385	36.2
Conservative	J France	521	13.6
Scottish Socialist	G Savage	136	3.6
Majority		402	
Turnout			57.9
Labour win (new seat)			

Ward 47: Baillieston
Party	Candidate	Votes	%
Labour	R G MacBean	1,619	52.4
SNP	P Smith	1,097	35.5
Scottish Socialist	A Brown	373	12.1
Majority		522	
Turnout			49.6
Labour win (new seat)			

Ward 48: Garrowhill
Party	Candidate	Votes	%
SNP	J F Mason	1,683	44.5
Labour	A Johnston	1,524	40.3
Conservative	G Clark	333	8.8
Liberal	J C MacPherson	151	4.0
Scottish Socialist	F MaQuaid	94	2.5
Majority		159	
Turnout			59.1
SNP win (new seat)			

Ward 49: Garthamlock
Party	Candidate	Votes	%
Labour	C McMaster	1,336	56.1
SNP	G Cunningham	720	30.2
Scottish Socialist	M McCartney	325	13.6
Majority		616	
Turnout			41.0
Labour win (new seat)			

Ward 50: Easterhouse
Party	Candidate	Votes	%
Labour	R Quinn	1,082	55.4
SNP	Z Alim	502	25.7
Scottish Socialist	Jim McVicar	369	18.9
Majority		580	
Turnout			35.2
Labour win (new seat)			

Ward 51: Drumoyne
Party	Candidate	Votes	%
Labour	S Dornan	1,771	58.4
SNP	I O Bayne	933	30.7
Scottish Socialist	P J Currie	210	6.9
Conservative	J P Toner	121	4.0
Majority		838	
Turnout			49.8
Labour win (new seat)			

Ward 52: Govan
Party	Candidate	Votes	%
Labour	J Flanagan	1,466	49.4
SNP	A Simpson	1,028	34.6
Scottish Socialist	C McCarthy	289	9.7
Conservative	D Pilkington	157	5.3
Humanist	M T Kerr	30	1.0
Majority		438	
Turnout			44.7
Labour win (new seat)			

Ward 53: Ibrox
Party	Candidate	Votes	%
Labour	D Gaugham	1,239	47.2
SNP	C McAleese	962	36.7
Scottish Socialist	Wullie McGartland	251	9.6
Conservative	J B Marshall	172	6.6
Majority		277	
Turnout			39.6
Labour win (new seat)			

Ward 54: Kingston
Party	Candidate	Votes	%
Labour	S Butt	1,494	46.5
SNP	J Hutcheson	1,093	32.3
Conservative	F Howell	459	14.3
Scottish Socialist	G Martin	223	6.9
Majority		465	
Turnout			46.2
Labour win (new seat)			

Ward 55: Mosspark
Party	Candidate	Votes	%
SNP	I Gibson	1,577	46.9
Labour	W Perry	1,289	38.4
Conservative	A McNamara	252	7.5
Scottish Socialist	George McNeilage	241	7.2
Majority		288	
Turnout			56.5
SNP win (new seat)			

Ward 56: North Cardonald
Party	Candidate	Votes	%
Labour	A Watson	2,137	62.7
SNP	F McCabe	840	24.6
Scottish Socialist	S Lawson	235	6.9
Conservative	D J Gray	197	5.8
Majority		1,297	
Turnout			58.2
Labour win (new seat)			

Ward 57: Penilee
Party	Candidate	Votes	%
Labour	G McDiarmid	1,906	58.3
SNP	A C Bain	937	28.7
Scottish Socialist	S Smyth	427	13.1
Majority		969	
Turnout			54.6
Labour win (new seat)			

Ward 58: Cardonald
Party	Candidate	Votes	%
Labour	J McCarron	1,672	45.4
SNP	M T Balfour	1,033	28.0
Scottish Socialist	G Healy	426	11.6
Conservative	W A Lankey	294	8.0
Liberal Democrats	F Wright	261	7.1
Majority		639	
Turnout			62.7
Labour win (new seat)			

Ward 59: Pollok
Party	Candidate	Votes	%
Scottish Socialist	Tommy Sheridan	1,264	44.0
Labour	T. Morrison	972	33.8
SNP	C. Wallace	528	18.4
Conservative	R. O'Brien	108	3.8
Majority		292	
Turnout			50.4
Scottish Socialist win (new seat)			

Ward 60: Crookston
Party	Candidate	Votes	%
Labour	W O'Rourke	1,762	54.2
SNP	P Greene	760	23.4
Scottish Socialist	C Moore	727	22.4
Majority		1,002	
Turnout			50.3
Labour win (new seat)			

Ward 61: Nitshill
Party	Candidate	Votes	%
Labour	A J Glass	1,302	51.7
SNP	E McBride	731	29.0
Scottish Socialist	S McManus	484	19.2
Majority		571	
Turnout			42.8
Labour win (new seat)			

Ward 62: Darnley
Party	Candidate	Votes	%
Labour	M A Kemaghan	1,249	48.0
SNP	G J Archer	962	37.0
Conservative	J Nixon	217	8.3
Scottish Socialist	Keith R Baldassara	174	6.7
Majority		287	
Turnout			42.6
Labour win (new seat)			

Ward 63: Carnwadric
Party	Candidate	Votes	%
Labour	J Dodds	1,654	55.6
SNP	M J Murray	955	32.4
Scottish Socialist	J Murray	355	11.9
Majority		689	
Turnout			46.7
Labour win (new seat)			

Ward 64 Maxwell Park
Party	Candidate	Votes	%
Conservative	C E Lyon	1,371	34.3
Labour	G Rabbani	1,101	27.5
SNP	M J McCracken	968	24,2
Liberal Democrats	I Aslam	381	9.5
Scottish Socialist	K Kyle	116	2.9
Scottish Unity	P J Paton	62	1.6
Majority		270	
Turnout			62.8
Conservative win (new seat)			

Ward 65: Pollokshields East
Party	Candidate	Votes	%
Labour	M Shoaib	1,707	47.8
SNP	K Malik	967	27.1
Liberal Democrats	J Fryer	380	10.6
Conservative	C Schmullan	277	7.8
Scottish Socialist	J Jamieson	243	6.8
Majority		740	
Turnout			54.8
Labour win (new seat)			

Ward 66: Hutchesontown
Party	Candidate	Votes	%
Labour	J Mutter	1,292	50.3
SNP	J Byrne	838	32.6
Scottish Socialist	O Meharry	438	17.1
Majority		43.2	
Turnout			454
Labour win (new seat)			

Ward 67: Govanhill
Party	Candidate	Votes	%
Labour	C McCafferty	1,652	55.6
SNP	G Anderson	824	27.7
Scottish Socialist	N I McKerrell	300	10.1
Conservative	M Hussein	196	6.6
Majority		828	
Turnout			44.6
Labour win (new seat)			

Ward 68: Strathbungo
Party	Candidate	Votes	%
Labour	W R MacLellan	1,088	35.7
SNP	R MacDonald	1,073	35.2
Scottish Socialist	R Kane	351	11.5
Liberal Democrats	R W Stewart	319	10.5
Conservative	E H Clark	216	7.1
Majority		15	
Turnout			44.1
Labour win (new seat)			

Ward 69: Battlefield
Party	Candidate	Votes	%
Labour	M McCafferty	1,485	47.0
SNP	G W Carradine	994	31.4
Conservative	K A Ross	369	11.7
Scottish Socialist	A Sheridan	313	9.9
Majority		491	
Turnout			48.5
Labour win (new seat)			

Ward 70: Langside
Party	Candidate	Votes	%
Labour	A Graham	1,207	37.1
SNP	W Ramsay	1,081	33.2
Conservative	S Henderson	417	12.8
Liberal Democrats	A H Begg	363	11.1
Scottish Socialist	J Harvie	188	5.8
Majority		126	
Turnout			50.1
Labour win (new seat)			

Ward 71: Pollokshaws
Party	Candidate	Votes	%
Labour	R Gould	1,358	40.8
SNP	I Hunter	1,146	34.5
Scottish Socialist	J Challis	304	9.1
Liberal Democrats	D M Jago	271	8.2
Conservative	M C Gallone	246	7.4
Majority		212	
Turnout			48.6
Labour win (new seat)			

Ward 72: Newlands
Party	Candidate	Votes	%
Labour	J McNally	1,495	38.7
SNP	W Douglas	1,001	25.9
Scottish Socialist	R McElory	949	24.6
Liberal Democrats	R Gleeson	420	10.9
Majority		494	
Turnout			60.1
Labour win (new seat)			

Ward 73: Cathcart
Party	Candidate	Votes	%
Labour	M McLean	1,323	34.8
Liberal Democrats	J R Prosser	867	22.8
Conservative	J B Crawford	813	21.4
SNP	A E McLaughlin	798	21.0
Majority		456	
Turnout			59.4
Labour win (new seat)			

Ward 74: Mount Florida
Party	Candidate	Votes	%
Labour	J Lynch	1,670	49.8
SNP	A Bennett	951	28.4
Conservative	C Graham	498	14.9
Scottish Socialist	F McKinlay	232	6.9
Majority		719	
Turnout			54.7
Labour win (new seat)			

Ward 75: Toryglen
Party	Candidate	Votes	%
Labour	A Watson	1,592	61.6
SNP	D Ross	591	22.9
Scottish Socialist	C McCusker	243	9.4
Liberal Democrats	R C Barlay	157	6.1
Majority		1,001	
Turnout			43.9
Labour win (new seat)			

Ward 76: King's Park
Party	Candidate	Votes	%
Labour	W M Timoney	1,515	45.4
SNP	J J Dornan	915	27.4
Conservative	G M Nankivell	457	13.7
Liberal Democrats	H Pryce-Jones	289	8.7
Scottish Socialist	J Walsh	158	4.7
Majority		600	
Turnout			55.0
Labour win (new seat)			

Ward 77: Castlemilk
Party	Candidate	Votes	%
Labour	J McKenzie	1,705	62.5
SNP	J Docherty	678	24.9
Conservative	M Kilpatrick	174	6.4
Scottish Socialist	W Moore	171	6.3
Majority		1,027	
Turnout			48.2
Labour win (new seat)			

Ward 78: Carmunnock
Party	Candidate	Votes	%
Labour	A Stewart	1,555	47.4
SNP	G W Brown	985	30.0
Conservative	G Carr	572	17.4
Scottish Socialist	D McKay	172	5.2
Majority		570	
Turnout			54.5
Labour win (new seat)			

Ward 79: Glenwood
Party	Candidate	Votes	%
Labour	M Devine	1,213	59.3
SNP	D I Ritchie	595	29.1
Scottish Socialist	F Young	239	11.7
Majority		618	
Turnout			34.7
Labour win (new seat)			
