= North East (Glasgow ward) =

Ward in Glasgow

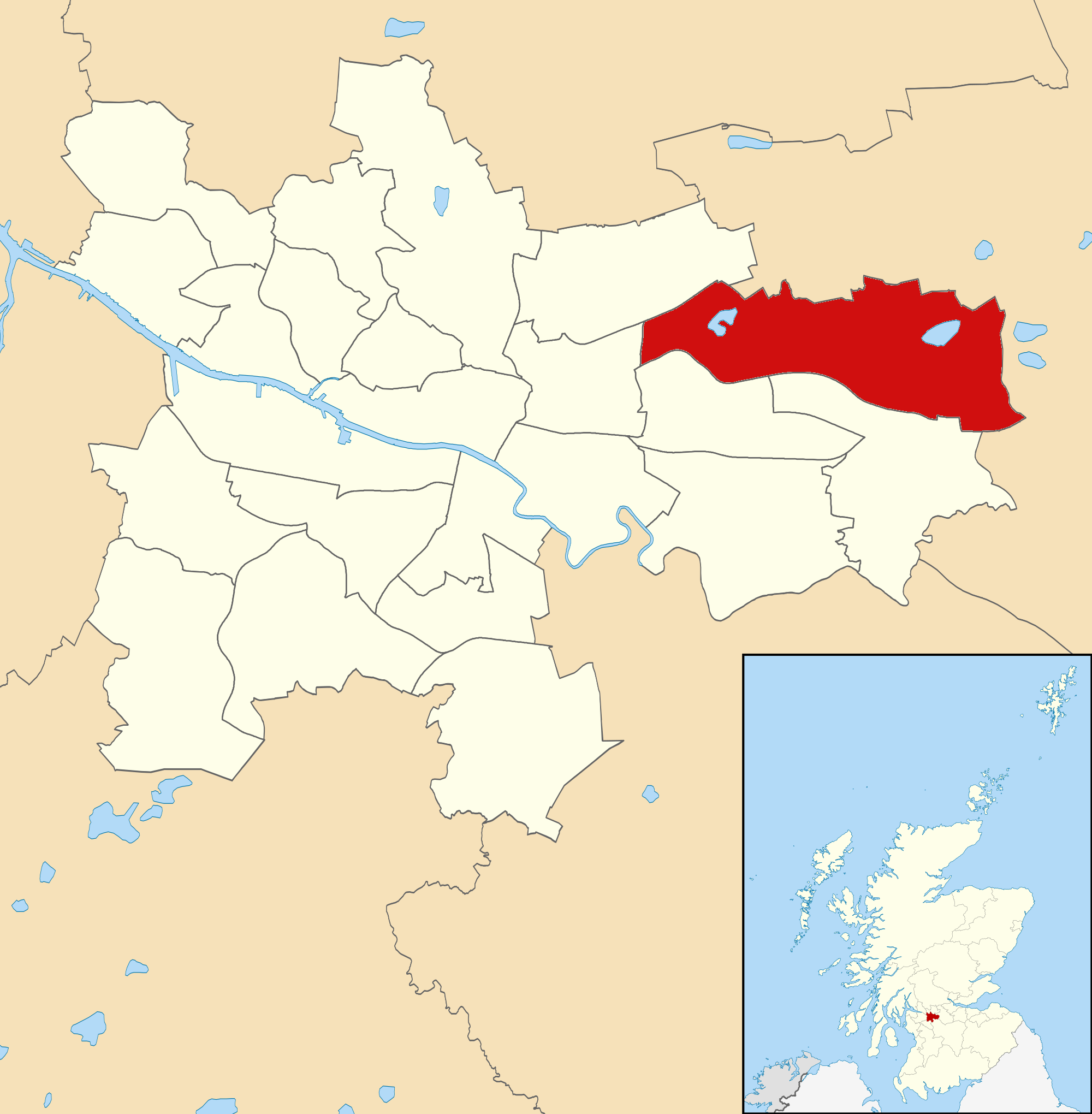
- North East Ward (2017) within Glasgow

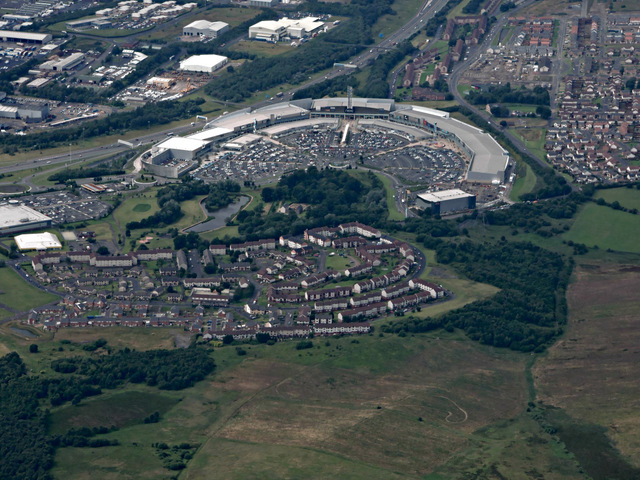
- Aerial view (2015) of the Provanhall and Garthamlock neighbourhoods in the North East ward, which also contains the Glasgow Fort shopping park
- Area: 14.90 km^{2} (5.75 sq mi)
- Population: 20,457 (2015)
  - Density: 1,372/km^{2} (3,550/sq mi)
- Council area: Glasgow City Council
- Lieutenancy area: Glasgow
- Country: Scotland
- Sovereign state: United Kingdom
- Post town: GLASGOW
- Postcode district: G33, G34
- Dialling code: 0141
- Police: Scotland
- Fire: Scottish
- Ambulance: Scottish

North East (Ward 21) is one of the 23 wards of Glasgow City Council. On its creation in 2007 and in 2012 it returned four council members, using the single transferable vote system. For the 2017 Glasgow City Council election, the ward boundaries were redrawn with a smaller size and population, and it returned three members.

== Boundaries ==
Located in the far north-east of Glasgow, the core of the ward since 2007 includes neighbourhoods between the M8 motorway and the city boundary with North Lanarkshire: Easterhouse, Provanhall, Garthamlock, Craigend, Ruchazie, Hogganfield, Provanmill and Blackhill as well as the village of Gartloch, all bordered by open ground, much of which is within the Seven Lochs Wetland Park.

The 2017 changes removed the Robroyston, Barmulloch, Wallacewell and Balornock neighbourhoods located to the west of the M80 motorway, as well as the streets in Millerston within Glasgow, which were added to the Springburn ward. Following the alterations, it was the ward covering the largest area in the city, but with the lowest population spread the most thinly across the territory. A 2019 specific review caused the removal of a few streets of modern housing at Cardowan from the North East ward and the Glasgow council area, re-allocating them to the Stepps, Chryston and Muirhead ward of North Lanarkshire along with the rest of the developments in that area, addressing an anomaly dating back to when the boundary crossed open fields.

== Councillors ==
Election	Councillors			
2007	Grant R Thoms (SNP)	Gilbert Davidson (Labour)	Gerald Leonard (Labour)	Catherine McMaster (Labour)
2012	Gerry Boyle (SNP)	Maureen Burke (Labour)	Gerald Leonard (Labour)	Sohan Singh (Labour)
2017	Ruairi Kelly (SNP)	Maureen Burke (Labour)	Mandy Morgan (SNP)	3 seats
2022	Ruairi Kelly (SNP)	Maureen Burke (Labour)	Sharon Greer (Labour)	3 seats
2024	Ruairi Kelly (SNP)	Mary McNab (Labour)	Sharon Greer (Labour)	3 seats
2025	Ruairi Kelly (SNP)	Donna McGill (SNP)	Sharon Greer (Labour)	3 seats

== Election results ==
=== 2025 by-election ===
North East by-election (20 March 2025) − 1 seat
Party	Candidate	FPv%	Count							
Party	Candidate	FPv%	1	2	3	4	5	6	7	8
SNP	Donna McGill	34.5	689	690	692	700	711	754	815	1,060
Labour	Debbie Duffy	28.7	573	576	581	591	612	623	728	
Reform	Rob Maddison	23.6	472	482	484	489	506	516		
Conservative	Kyle Cannon	4.1	81	85	87	88				
Green	Hayley McDonald	3.5	70	70	82	90	97			
TUSC	Anne McAllister	2.6	52	53	55					
Liberal Democrats	Peter McLaughlin	1.9	37	37						
UKIP	Christopher Ho	1.2	24							
Electorate: 14,955 Valid: 1,998 Spoilt: 31 Quota: 1,000 Turnout: 13.6

=== 2024 by-election ===
North East by-election (21 November 2024) − 1 seat
Party	Candidate	FPv%	Count						
Party	Candidate	FPv%	1	2	3	4	5	6	7
Labour	Mary McNab	34.3	630	642	655	671	708	808	1,069
SNP	Kilian Riley	32.2	591	596	605	632	638	686	
Reform	Robert McGregor	18.2	336	337	349	366	397		
Conservative	Thomas Haddow	5.3	99	104	107	111			
Green	Hayley McDonald	4.2	77	79	94				
TUSC	Anne McAllister	3.7	68	72					
Liberal Democrats	Peter McLaughlin	1.9	36						
Electorate: 15,040 Valid: 1,837 Spoilt: 31 Quota: 919 Turnout: 12.4%

=== 2022 election ===
2022 Glasgow City Council election

North East − 3 seats
Party	Candidate	FPv%	Count							
Party	Candidate	FPv%	1	2	3	4	5	6	7	8
Labour	Maureen Burke (incumbent)	34.0	1,532							
SNP	Ruairi Kelly (incumbent)	29.0	1,305							
SNP	Mandy Morgan (incumbent)	13.6	612	624	770	771	775	846	862	
Labour	Sharon Greer	9.9	447	790	798	804	815	852	1,067	1,349
Conservative	John White	8.6	389	403	404	407	415	422		
Green	Iain McLarty	3.0	136	141	151	157	175			
TUSC	Annie McAllister	1.2	52	56	57	62				
Scottish Libertarian	Cam Milne	0.6	28	31	31					
Electorate: 15,312 Valid: 4,501 Spoilt: 158 Quota: 1,126 Turnout: 30.4%

=== 2017 election ===
2017 Glasgow City Council election

North East – 3 seats
Party	Candidate	FPv%	Count							
Party	Candidate	FPv%	1	2	3	4	5	6	7	8
Labour	Maureen Burke (incumbent)	27.25%	1,176							
SNP	Ruairi Kelly	22.50%	971	974	979	991	1,030	1,160		
SNP	Mandy Morgan	17.13%	739	740	743	771	792	871	940	1,035
Conservative	Frances Howell	12.14%	524	527	528	543	607	684	684	
Independent	Gerry Boyle (incumbent)	9.89%	427	432	437	452	534			
Labour	Stephen Docherty	7.93%	342	411	415	438				
Green	Carole Ure	2.36%	102	103	109					
Solidarity	Jenny Kiernan	0.79%	34	35						
Electorate: 15,406 Valid: 4,315 Spoilt: 198 Quota: 1,079 Turnout: 29.3%

=== 2012 election ===
2012 Glasgow City Council election

North East – 4 seats
Party	Candidate	FPv%	Count	
Party	Candidate	FPv%	1	2
Labour	Maureen Burke	29.18%	1,958	
SNP	Gerry Boyle	20.53%	1,378	
Labour	Gerry Leonard (incumbent)	20.04%	1,345	
Labour	Sohan Singh	14.39%	966	1,411
SNP	Tony Kenny	9.12%	612	647
Conservative	Kim Schmulian	3.13%	210	215
Green	Stuart Clay (Note: Outgoing councillor from Partick West ward.)	1.76%	118	141
Liberal Democrats	John C. MacPherson	1.13%	76	85
TUSC	Jamie Cocozza	0.72%	48	58
Electorate: 25,247 Valid: 6,711 Spoilt: 242 Quota: 1,343 Turnout: 27.54%

=== 2007 election ===
2007 Glasgow City Council election

2007 Council election: North East
Party	Candidate	FPv%	%	Seat	Count
Labour	Gilbert Davidson	2,272	27.1		
SNP	Grant R Thoms	2,098	25.1		
Labour	Gerald Leonard (Note: Outgoing councillor for Gartcraig single-member ward.)	1,475	17.6		
Labour	Catherine McMaster (Note: Outgoing councillor for Garthamlock single-member ward.)	1,040	12.4		
Conservative	John France	485	5.8		
Solidarity	Joanne Reilly	350	4.2		
Liberal Democrats	John C MacPherson	228	2.7		
Green	Stewart MacDonald	186	2.2		
Scottish Socialist	Andy McPake	129	1.5		
Independent	George Savage	100	1.2		

== See also ==
- Wards of Glasgow
