= Springboig =

Coordinates: 55.8584°N 4.1568°W

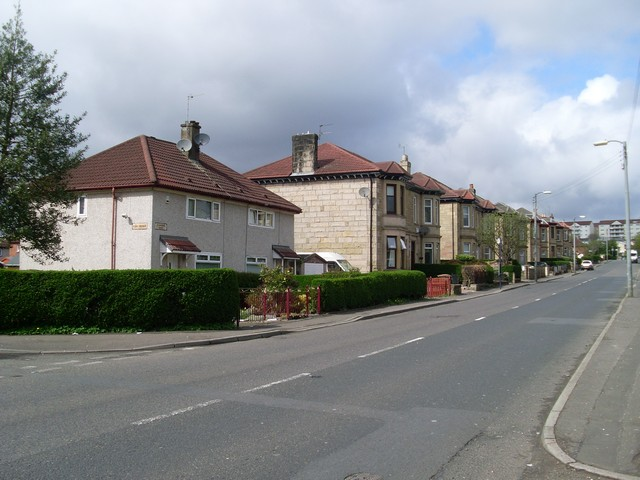
- Springboig Road

- Location within Glasgow
- OS grid reference: NS651649
- Council area: Glasgow City Council
- Lieutenancy area: Glasgow
- Country: Scotland
- Sovereign state: United Kingdom
- Post town: GLASGOW
- Postcode district: G32 0
- Dialling code: 0141
- Police: Scotland
- Fire: Scottish
- Ambulance: Scottish
- UK Parliament: Glasgow East
- Scottish Parliament: Glasgow Shettleston

Springboig is a neighbourhood in the east end of the Scottish city of Glasgow, situated north of the River Clyde. Administratively, it has been within the city's East Centre ward since 2017, having previously been in the Baillieston ward.

Springboig is bordered to the south by Shettleston and Budhill, to the east by Barlanark and Sandymount Cemetery, directly to the west by Greenfield with Carntyne, St Andrews Secondary School, Lightburn Hospital and Greenfield Park beyond, and to the north by the Edinburgh Road (A8), with Cranhill and Queenslie on the opposite side of the carriageways.

== History ==
Named after a farm which previously occupied the land, the Springboig area stayed in Lanarkshire when most of the surrounding territory at Shettleston was transferred into Glasgow in 1912 – it remained in the Bothwell constituency along with Mount Vernon and Baillieston, and did not formally join the city until a reorganisation under the Local Government (Scotland) Act 1973.

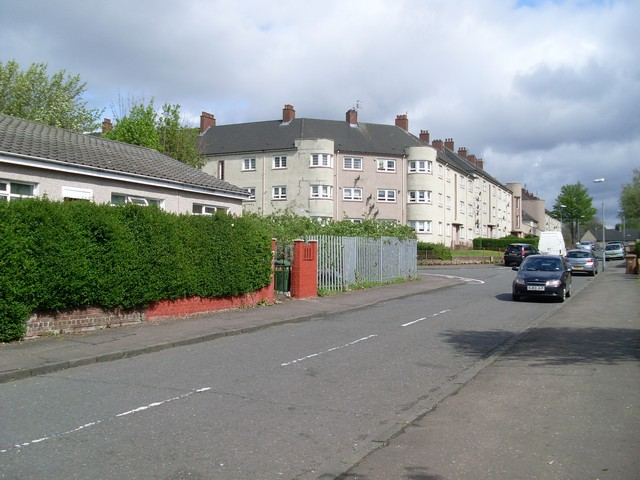
Distinctive tenements on Larchgrove Avenue

The first housing in the area was a few streets of sandstone semi-detached villas and terraces, constructed around the turn of the 20th century and are still present today. This was followed in the 1930s by a larger development consisting mostly of cottage flats, then by another expansion to the north in the late 1940s involving steel-framed houses and a "quadrangle" of distinctive tenements with rounded bay windows. This was prior to the construction of the much larger neighbouring schemes at Cranhill, Barlanark, Craigend, Garthamlock, Ruchazie, Easterhouse, Easthall and Wellhouse, which lie to the north and east of Springboig, as well as Greenfield to its immediate west, all of which were built between the 1950s and 1960s to alleviate the post-war housing shortage in the city.

There were two facilities for juvenile offenders and others requiring specialist care in the area: Larchgrove Remand Home/Assessment Centre and Glasgow Truant Industrial School/St John's School Springboig, both of which have closed and have been subject to investigations of abuse by staff of the young people in their care (particularly at Larchgrove in the 1970s).
