= Queenslie =

Coordinates: 55.865126°N 4.143562°W

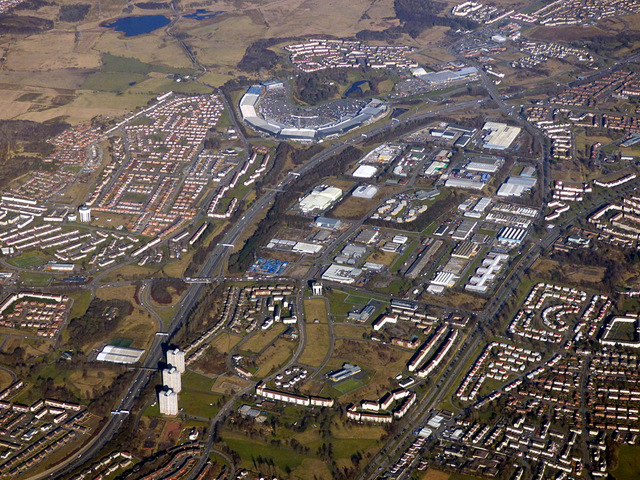
- Aerial view from the west; Queenslie at centre-right of image between Glasgow Fort and Cranhill

- Location within Glasgow
- OS grid reference: NS658656
- Council area: Glasgow City Council
- Lieutenancy area: Glasgow
- Country: Scotland
- Sovereign state: United Kingdom
- Post town: GLASGOW
- Postcode district: G33
- Dialling code: 0141
- Police: Scotland
- Fire: Scottish
- Ambulance: Scottish
- UK Parliament: Glasgow East
- Scottish Parliament: Glasgow Provan

Queenslie is a district in the Scottish city of Glasgow.

Established in the 1950s as a large industrial estate with a small area of residential housing with a primary school, by the late 1990s the condition of the tenement properties had deteriorated and the local authority decided to demolish them altogether and extend the industrial provision, which in the early 21st century is the largest such dedicated estate in the city (Hillington falls just outside the city boundaries).

== Location ==
Situated just to the east of Cranhill with the boundary being Stepps Road, Queenslie is separated from Garthamlock to the north by the M8 motorway, originally the Monkland Canal, while Bartiebeith Road forms the south-east boundary with Wellhouse – these are all residential housing schemes built in the same era as Queenslie. To the south-west is the A8 Edinburgh Road, a major trunk road and bus route. The Springboig and Barlanark neighbourhoods lie on the opposite side of the main thoroughfare.

== History ==
Queenslie is within the 'Greater Easterhouse' conurbation in the north-east of Glasgow, developed following World War II to provide badly needed housing in new peripheral 'schemes' for residents of the city (in this case largely from East End districts such as Dalmarnock, the Garngad and Parkhead) living in overcrowded and unsanitary accommodation alongside heavy industry. The area was once farmland, built mainly on the Easter Queenslie and Wester Queenslie farms; on the William Roy map (1747–1755) the farm and general area was spelled 'Quinsley' which latterly evolved into Queenslie.

Modern Queenslie started as an industrial estate in the 1950s, with housing (a complex of three-storey tenements) added a short time later followed by a primary school – the main streets running through Queenslie were Horndean Crescent, Penston Road, Lonmay Road, Lonmay Path and Blairtummock Road. The nearest Catholic schools were in Cranhill, with nondenominational secondary education provision at Garthamlock (the Queenslie housing was originally connected directly to Garthamlock by a footbridge over the canal until 1969, but was not replaced by an equivalent over the motorway until 1980). At its peak in the 1960s and 1970s Queenslie was a vibrant scheme with a close-knit community with most of the residents employed locally, with factories nearby including Olivetti.

From the early 1980s onwards, like many working class estates across Glasgow, various inter-related factors including poor building quality and resultant health problems, poor provision of amenities, drug and alcohol abuse and territorial gang violence caused the neighbourhood to go into terminal decline. With the Queenslie tenements arranged in a tight grid design in an isolated location already surrounded by industry, altering the use of the land to another function was easier to accomplish than elsewhere in the city, and in the mid-1990s all the housing was demolished along with the primary school, and the industrial estate expanded in its place. The community centre building was spared and remains in situ; it was used as a substance abuse rehabilitation centre for almost two decades up to its closure in 2017, despite protests from locals. Other local areas were similarly affected by the physical and social deterioration of the schemes; the schools serving Queenslie all closed as the surrounding population fell considerably during a lengthy period of demolition of the worst properties, replaced by housing of a lower density and higher quality, and renovation of others

The industrial estate continues to have high levels of occupation, owing to its location alongside the M8 and close to other motorways leading across Scotland and beyond. In addition to commercial tenants, it is the site of one of the four main waste recycling facilities in Glasgow, serving the north-east sector.
