= Danny McGrain (footballer, born 1953) =

Scottish footballer (1953–2004)

Personal information
- Full name: Daniel McGrain
- Date of birth: 27 May 1953
- Place of birth: Glasgow, Scotland
- Place of death: Scotland
- Position: Midfielder

Youth career
- Blantyre Victoria

Senior career*
| Years | Team | Apps | (Gls) |
| 1971–1974 | Clyde | 88 | (4) |
- * Club domestic league appearances and goals

Daniel McGrain (born 27 May 1953) was a Scottish footballer who spent his entire senior career with Clyde.

== Career ==
Born in the Barlanark area of Glasgow, McGrain began his career with junior side Blantyre Victoria, winning the Scottish Junior Cup with them in 1970.

He signed for Clyde in 1971, and made his debut against Aberdeen in a Scottish League Cup tie in August of that year. McGrain was appointed Clyde captain the following season whilst only nineteen years of age, making him the youngest Clyde captain ever, a record which he holds to this day.

In a game against Dundee United in February 1974, McGrain headed the ball off the line, sustaining an injury. He collapsed in the dressing room after the game, and was rushed to hospital with suspected brain damage. McGrain was forced to retire through injury at the start of the 1975–76 season, after playing 109 matches for the club in all competitions. .
