= Provan Hall =

House in Glasgow, Scotland

Coordinates: 55.871571°N 4.131930°W

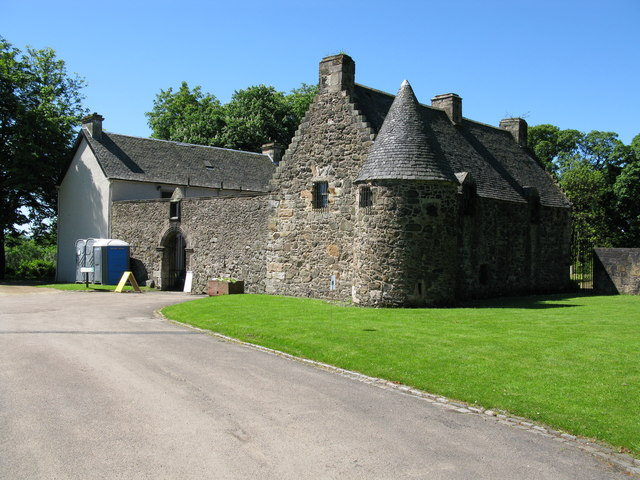
Provan Hall

Provan Hall (also known over time as Provanhall, Hall of Provan and Hall Mailings) is a historic place composed of two buildings built about the 15th century and situated in Auchinlea Park, Easterhouse, Glasgow. It is owned by the National Trust for Scotland and leased by Glasgow City Council. The two parallel buildings, enclosing a courtyard, are protected as a category A listed building. The building has recently been renovated and now operates as a small museum. It is managed by Provan Hall Community Management Trust. It has been used as a set for filming ‘Outlander’.

== Location ==
Provan Hall is located in the twenty-acre (eight-hectare) Auchinlea Park adjacent to the Glasgow Fort retail centre.

== Naming ==
The name "Hall of Provan" was used in early records. Today, the use of the name "Provan Hall" is used to refer to the buildings collectively.

== Residents ==
After the Scottish Reformation, Provan Hall became a residence of the lawyer and President of Session, William Baillie (died 1593) and his wife Elizabeth Durham. In 1566 he was collector of the teinds or tithes known as the "Thirds of Benefices" for the parsonage of Glasgow. As a judge, he was known as Lord Provand. He was called the "Prebend of Barlanerk alias Provan", and in November 1592 James VI of Scotland confirmed his ownership of the mill and meadow of Provan.

His daughter the heiress of Provan, Elizabeth Baillie (died 1609), married Robert Hamilton (died 1642), a son of Andrew Hamilton of Goslington and Silvertonhill. They gave the house and lands to their eldest son, Francis Hamilton, on 31 October 1599. James VI confirmed Elizabeth Baillie's gift of Provan to her son on 15 November 1600.

Francis Hamilton of Silvertonhill (died 1645) married Agnes Hamilton, a daughter of the Laird of Innerwick and a niece of the lawyer Thomas Hamilton. He was known as poet and published verses in praise of the late James VI and I in 1626, dedicated to the Marquess of Hamilton and the Chancellor of Scotland, George Hay of Kinnoull. In later life, Francis Hamilton claimed he had been the victim of witchcraft practiced against him before his marriage by Isabel Boyd, Lady Blair, a daughter of Thomas Boyd, 6th Lord Boyd. She had been contracted to marry him in 1607, and Francis Hamilton may have come to blame his misfortunes in life on her. He sold the lands to his brother Edward Hamilton and ownership of Provan descended in the Hamilton of Silvertonhill family. Above the arched entrance to the courtyard, a carved stone includes the initials "R.H" for Robert Hamilton, and the date 1647.

In 1667, Robert Hamilton sold the property to Glasgow City Council. The council created the office of "Bailie of Provan" to manage the estate. In 1729 the burgh council sold the house and remaining lands to Robert Lang. Although all the lands were sold by 1767, the council appointment of a Bailie of Provan continued.

In the 1950s, Harold Bride, who was the junior wireless operator on the RMS Titanic's ill-fated maiden voyage, lived in the hall as its caretaker on the behalf of the National Trust for Scotland, maintaining and giving tours of the building.

== Textiles and Elizabeth Durham, Lady Provan ==
The will of Elizabeth Durham, Lady Provan (or Lady Provand), who died at Provan Hall on 11 December 1585 gives some details of the farmstock at Provan and her textile craftwork. She was also a fashion leader, in November 1578 Margaret Kennedy, Countess of Cassilis wrote to her daughter Katherine Kennedy, Lady Barnbarroch, about having a cloak made from the same sort of black fabric as one of Lady Provan's skirts.

Elizabeth Durham was probably a relation of the courtier Sandy Durham of Duntarvie and the main branch of her family lived at the Grange of Monifieth. Elizabeth Durham's will includes money owed for buying linen and harding (a coarser linen fabric) from two men from Provan, William Watson and John MacNair. They were workers on the estate and administrators known as the Officers of Provan. It is likely that the linen cloth was made from local flax spun by women on the Provan estate and woven in Glasgow by professional weavers.

Elizabeth Durham had an account with an Edinburgh textile merchant Mungo Russell (died 1591), who sold a wide variety of textiles and thread, mostly imported from Flanders. Russell had sold cloth to Mary, Queen of Scots. Elizabeth Durham owed £11 Scots to another merchant in Edinburgh for "ribbons, silk and small gear" for her own textile work. She also had an account with a merchant in Stirling, John Willesone (died 1593), owing him £11. Willesone sold velvets and silk fabrics for women's clothes, and also pepper and ginger, oak galls and alum for dying, soap, sugar, and confections in boxes. Elizabeth had borrowed money by pledging her gold chains. One lender was Jonet Gilbert, a daughter of the goldsmith Michael Gilbert and wife of the Provost Nicol Uddert. Elizabeth Durham left 13 shillings to the old nurse, Isobel Adamson, who had looked after her children. In her last illness, Elizabeth Durham was looked after by Marion Bartilmo, a servant who had worked for the family for at least 13 years, but had not yet received her wages and hiring bounty payment.

== In Recent Times ==
Provan Hall is currently managed by the charity Provan Hall Community Management Trust. Provan Hall reopened to the public in September 2023, after extensive renovations.

Visitors are welcome. Unusually, for a visitor attraction, Provan Hall is also a community hub. Free and low-cost clubs and events are frequently held.

== Gallery ==
Provan Hall
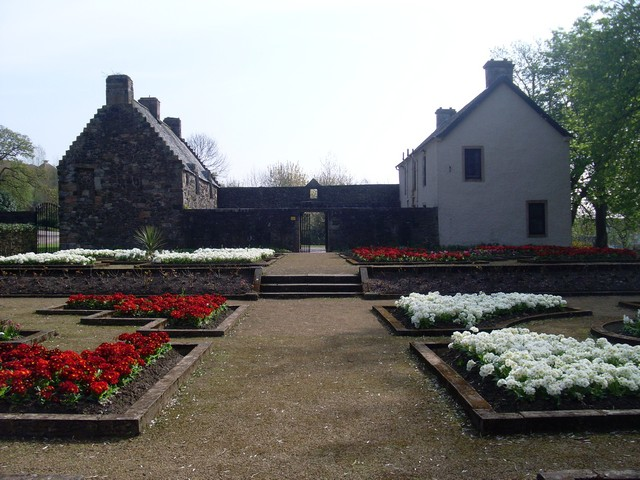
Gardens of the Provan Hall.

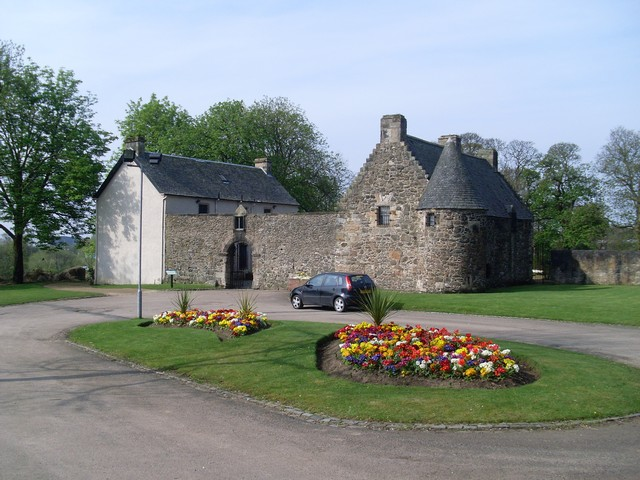
The north range of Provan Hall

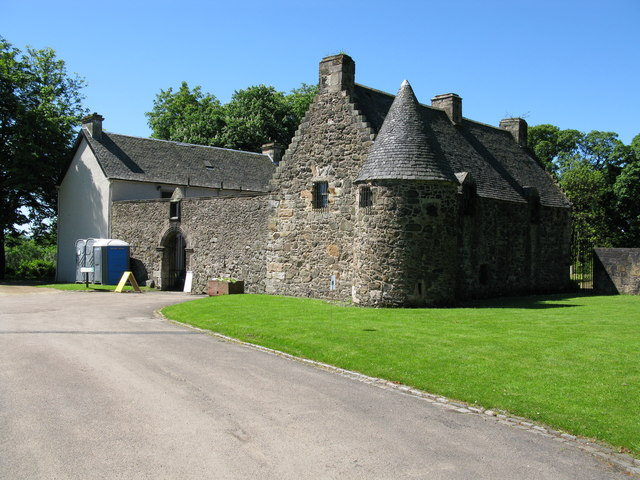
Provan Hall

== See also ==
- Provand's Lordship, built in 1471, also in Glasgow.
- Provanhall, a small nearby residential district of East Glasgow that takes its name from Provan Hall.
