= Lochend Community High School =

Location
- 20 Cairnbrook Road; Glasgow, G34 0NZ; Scotland; 55.8683°N 4.1078°W

Information
- Local authority: Glasgow City
- Headteacher: Katie Anderson
- Gender: Coeducational
- Enrolment: 420 (September 2018)
- Capacity: 481
- Houses: Arran, Mull, Skye Islay
- Colours: Red, Yellow, Blue, Green
- Website: http://www.lochendcommunityhigh.glasgow.sch.uk

Lochend Community High School is a non-denominational, coeducational, state secondary school in the Easterhouse area of Glasgow. The school is within the local authority of Glasgow City Council.

The school teaches pupils across all secondary stages from S1 to S6, and has the capacity to accommodate up to 850 pupils. With a current pupil roll of approximately 450, it is one of the smaller secondary schools in the city. There are approximately 40 members of teaching and non-teaching staff based at the school. The headteacher is Mr David Macarthur

== Associated Primary Schools ==
The school has two associated primary schools. These are Oakwood Primary School and Aultmore Primary School. Along with partner primary schools, Lochend Community High School is part of the Lochend Learning Community.

== School Facilities ==
The school's facilities include:

- A large open-plan dining/performance/social space;
- 24 general classrooms
- 6 dedicated ICT teaching areas
- 8 science labs
- 4 technical rooms
- 4 art and design rooms
- 3 home economics rooms
- 2 music rooms
- 1 drama studio
- 2 gymnasia
- 1 games hall.

The inclusion of a large library and IT Learning Centre helps pupils and teachers make the most of digital technology.

Physical education facilities include:

- 4 indoor areas
- a synthetic pitch
- a grass pitch
- a running track.

== Lochend CHS Sports Centre ==
Lochend Community High School shares a campus with Lochend CHS Sports Centre which hosts a variety of facilities which are managed by Glasgow Club Easterhouse a part of Glasgow Life.

The facilities include:

- 5 full size quality grass pitches;
- 1 full size floodlit synthetic pitch;
- 1 floodlit synthetic five-a-side pitch;
- 1 indoor hall for five-a-side or badminton;
- 2 indoor gyms suitable for dance, martial arts, children's activities;
- Top quality changing facilities.

== History ==
Lochend Community High remains the only secondary school in the Easterhouse area, following the closure of Westwood Secondary in the 1980s and St Leonard's Secondary in the 2000s. The school was formally opened as Lochend Community High when Lochend Secondary school closed to move into the new purpose-built community campus in 2002.

In November 2019, Lochend Community High School was ranked as the second-worst performing state school in the whole of Scotland in the annual exam league tables, with only 8% of pupils leaving with 5 SCQF Level 6 awards; the equivalent of 5 Higher qualifications. Only Northfield Academy in Aberdeen did worse, with just 7% of their pupils leaving school with five Higher qualifications. Conversely, in 2021 and 2022, the school achieved a 100% outcome in 'positive destinations' with all those leaving that year allocated a place in higher or further education, on a training course or directly into employment, despite the challenges associated with the pupils being overwhelmingly from economically deprived backgrounds and the impact of the COVID-19 pandemic in Scotland. In 2022 the school celebrated its highest exam scores yet with 93.3% of pupils passing their 5 SCQF exams.

== Notable alumni ==
- Callum McGregor, footballer
