= Easthall =

Neighbourhood in Glasgow, Scotland

Coordinates: 55.862205°N 4.126448°W

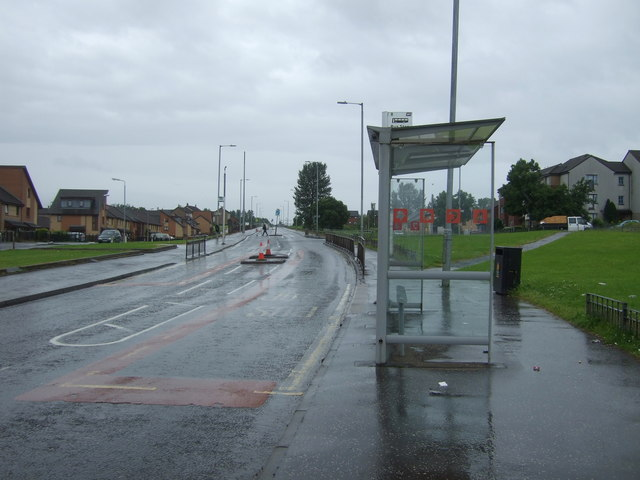
- Wellhouse Road (Easthall housing on right)

- Location within Glasgow
- OS grid reference: NS670652
- Council area: Glasgow City Council
- Lieutenancy area: Glasgow
- Country: Scotland
- Sovereign state: United Kingdom
- Post town: GLASGOW
- Postcode district: G33 / G34
- Dialling code: 0141
- Police: Scotland
- Fire: Scottish
- Ambulance: Scottish
- UK Parliament: Glasgow East
- Scottish Parliament: Glasgow Provan

Easthall is a residential neighbourhood in the East End of the Scottish city of Glasgow. Since 2007 it has been part of the Baillieston administrative ward within the Glasgow City Council area.

== Location and amenities ==
Easthall was constructed in the 1950s as a council housing scheme as part of 'Greater Easterhouse' (taking its name from the nearby East Hallhill Farm which no longer exists) although it is physically separated from the main Easterhouse scheme and its amenities by the M8 Motorway; both Easterhouse and Easthall are served by Junction 10 of the motorway which is also the exit for the Glasgow Fort shopping centre.

The area is bordered to the north by the M8 (which follows the same route as the former Monkland Canal), to the south by the A8 Edinburgh Road – beyond which lies the Barlanark district, to the east by an expanse of open ground leading to Glasgow East Investment Park, and to the west by the larger residential area of Wellhouse.

Some of the area's original tenements have been refurbished, with the remainder demolished and replaced by modest houses; however, a few streets which were cleared were never built upon again, until 2018 when plans were submitted for new homes on the derelict land. Most of the properties are managed by Easthall Park Housing Co-operative, established in 1992. In 2017, the association received an award from the Scottish Land Fund to improve facilities in the locality.

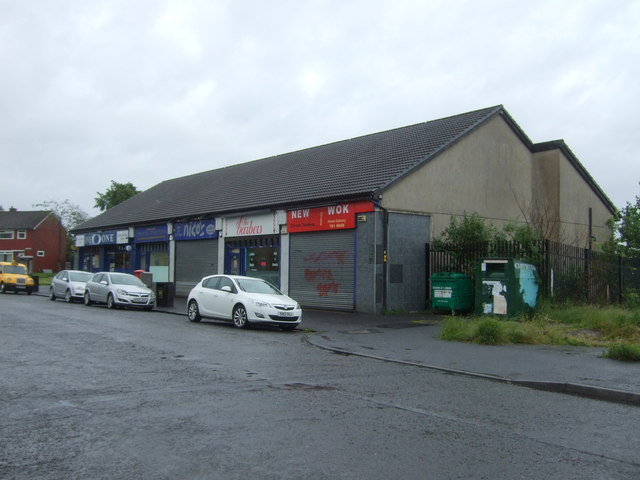
Easthall's shops (2017)

The neighbourhood contains a community centre (the Glenburn Centre) adjacent to a small park and play area, and a row of shops on Wardie Road. to the south of the neighbourhood is the Stepford Sports Park, a facility for football including artificial turf pitches for hire. The nearest school is in Wellhouse.

Barlanark, Easthall and Wellhouse share many characteristics and there has been a history of gang-related tension and violence between the youths living in the schemes, although in the 2010s a lot of progress was made by way of initiatives to provide alternatives to gang activity and build links between local communities.

The frequent (six per hour) '41' and '60' bus services operated by First Glasgow pass along Wellhouse Road (on different routes between Glasgow City Centre and Easterhouse), while the '38E' service passes along Edinburgh Road towards Baillieston. The nearest railway stations are Garrowhill and Easterhouse, both on the North Clyde Line between West Dunbartonshire and Edinburgh.

In 2016, Glasgow City Council outlined masterplans for the development of the Greater Easterhouse area (including Easthall) over the next 20 years.
