= Wellhouse =

Coordinates: 55.861°N 4.136°W

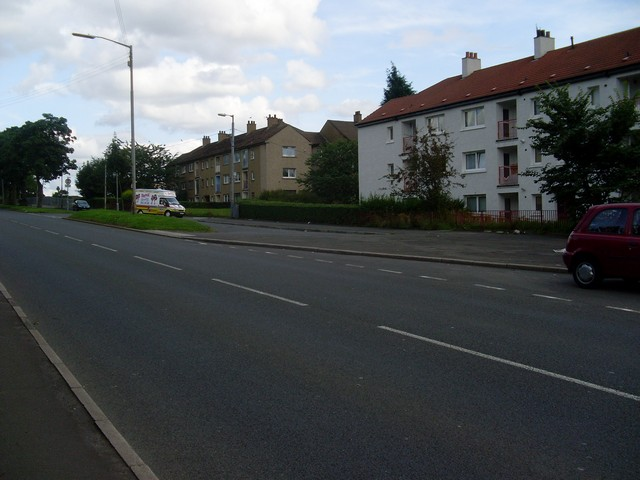
- Housing just off Bartiebeith Road (2009)

- Location within Glasgow
- OS grid reference: NS664652
- Council area: Glasgow City Council
- Lieutenancy area: Glasgow
- Country: Scotland
- Sovereign state: United Kingdom
- Post town: GLASGOW
- Postcode district: G33 4
- Dialling code: 0141
- Police: Scotland
- Fire: Scottish
- Ambulance: Scottish
- UK Parliament: Glasgow North East
- Scottish Parliament: Glasgow Provan

Wellhouse is a residential area in the East End of the Scottish city of Glasgow. Since 2007 it has been part of the Baillieston administrative ward within the Glasgow City Council area.

== Location and history ==
Wellhouse consists primarily of council tenements dating from the time the 'scheme' was laid out in the late 1950s and which were refurbished in the early 21st century, as well as some modern houses built to replace other tenements which were knocked down. There are two primary schools (Aultmore Park Primary and Newhills [Additional Support Needs] School), a row of shops, a youth facility with children’s play area and a modern community centre in the centre of the neighbourhood. There are also areas of waste ground where buildings (including the Roman Catholic Archdiocese of Glasgow's Blessed John Ogilvie's church and the previous Wellhouse Primary School) were demolished and the land remains unused; with speculation of the usability due to flooding, and water mitigation issues.

Wellhouse was constructed in the 1950s as part of 'Greater Easterhouse' although it is physically separated from the main scheme and its amenities by the M8 Motorway (and served by Junction 10 which is also the exit for Glasgow Fort shopping centre). It is bordered to the west and north by Queenslie (an industrial suburb), to the south (across Edinburgh Road) by the Barlanark residential district, and to the east by the smaller area of Easthall.

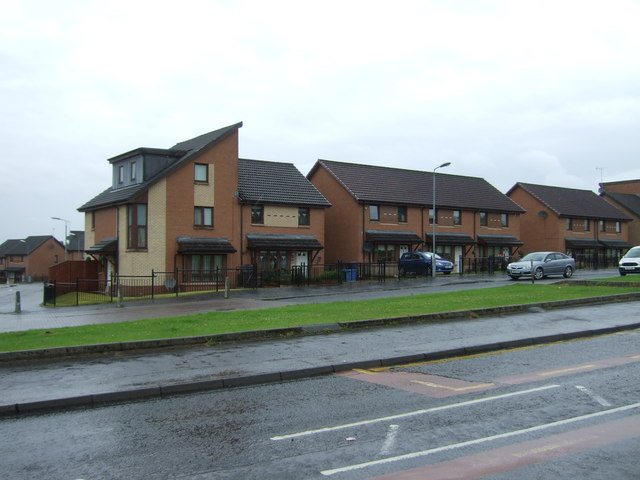
modern housing on Langbar Crescent (2017)

Wellhouse, Barlanark and Easthall share many characteristics and there has been a history of gang-related tension and violence between the youths living in the schemes, although in the 2010s a lot of progress was made by way of initiatives to provide alternatives to gang activity and build links between local communities.

The area was home to one of the more successful amateur football teams in Glasgow, "Wellhouse AFC", who won the Scottish Amateur Cup in 2013 but folded soon after in 2015 after 40 years in competition.

The frequent (six per hour) '41' and '60' bus services operated by First Glasgow pass through Wellhouse Road (on different routes between Glasgow City Centre and Easterhouse), while the '38E' service passes along Edinburgh Road towards Baillieston. The nearest railway station is Garrowhill on the North Clyde Line between West Dunbartonshire and Edinburgh.

In 2016, Glasgow City Council outlined masterplans for the development of the Greater Easterhouse area (including Wellhouse) over the next 20 years.
