= Provand's Lordship =

Historic house museum in Glasgow, Scotland

Coordinates: 55.8624°N 4.2369°W

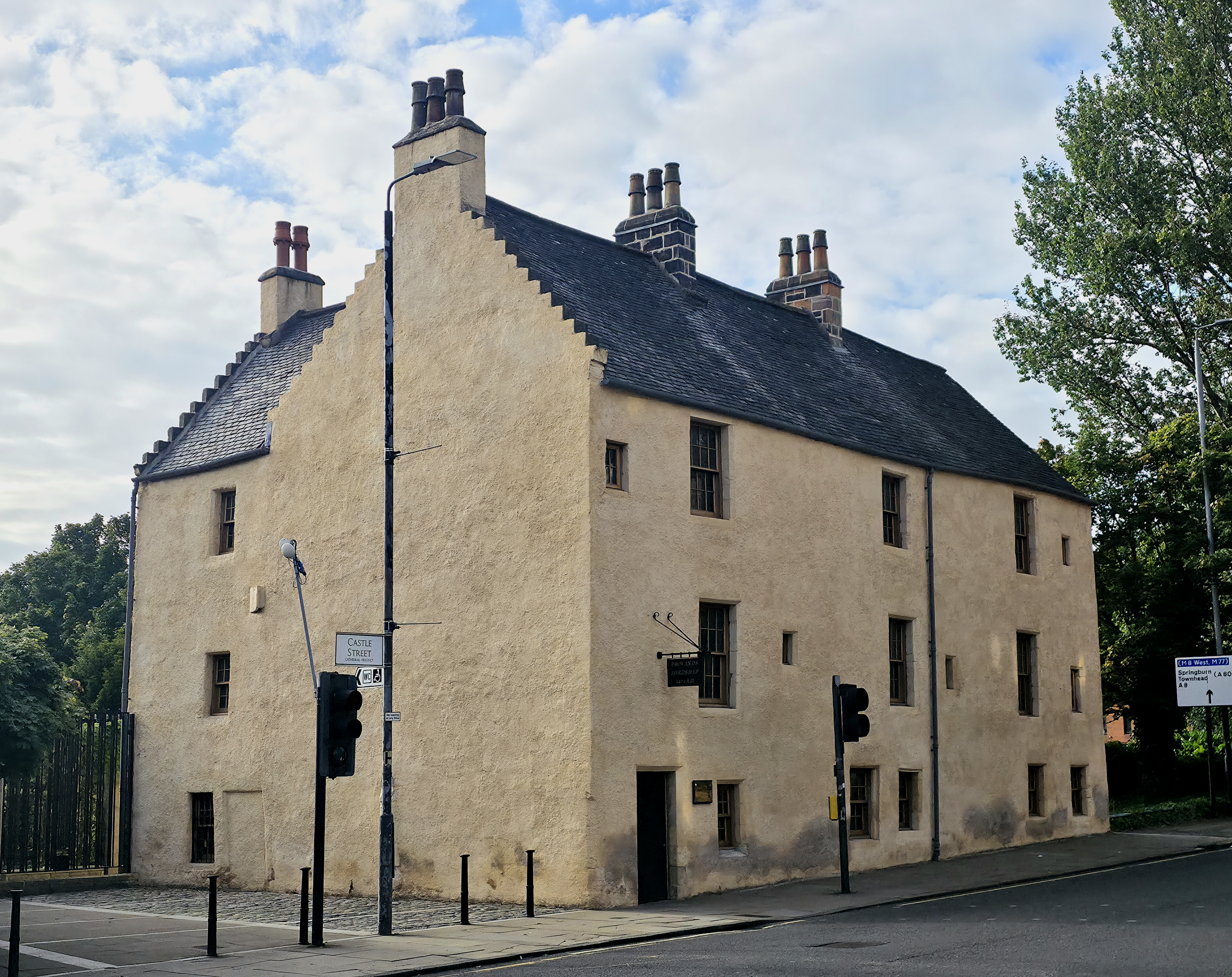
Provand's Lordship in 2026

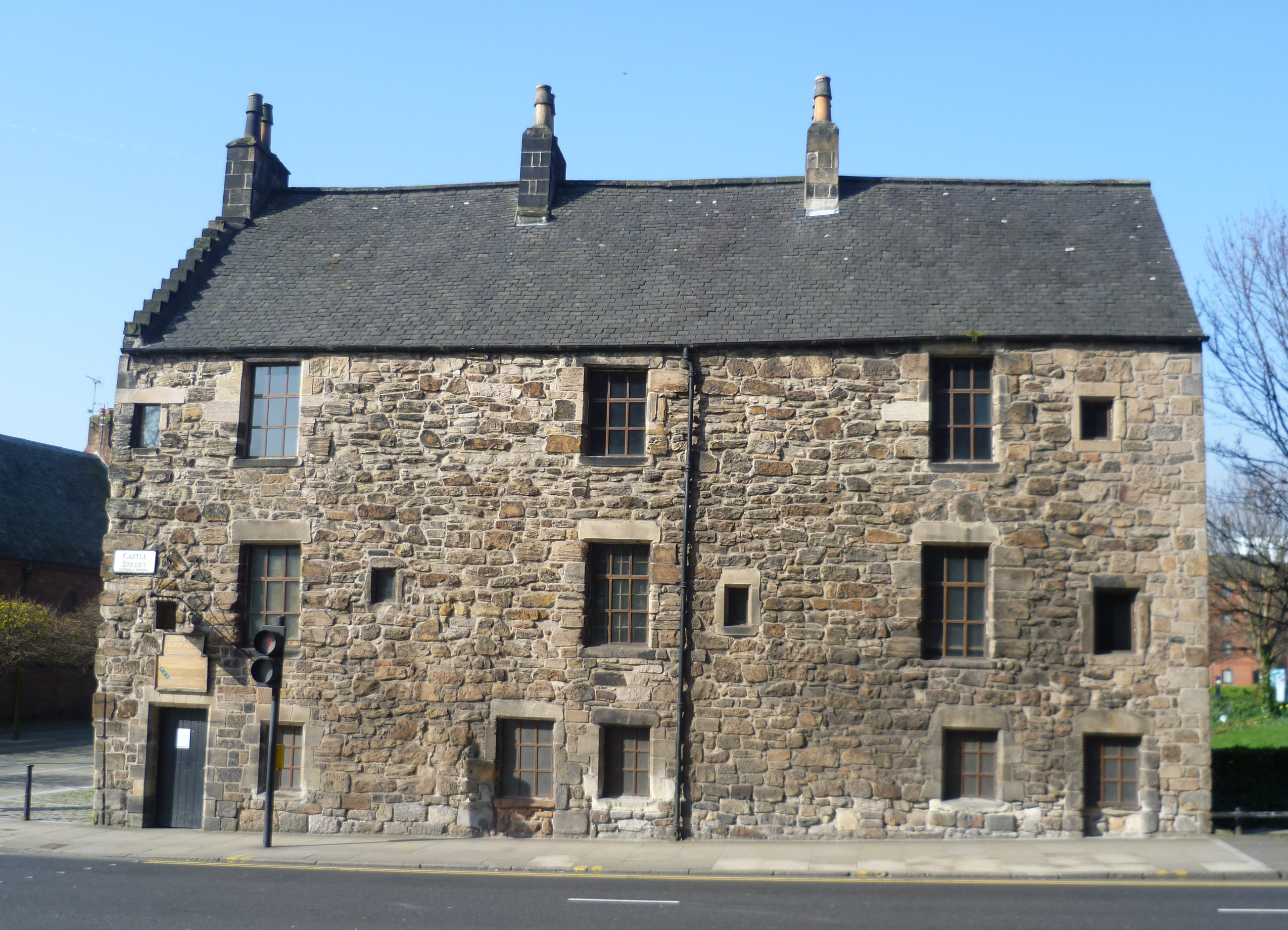
Provand's Lordship as it appeared before rendering in 2023

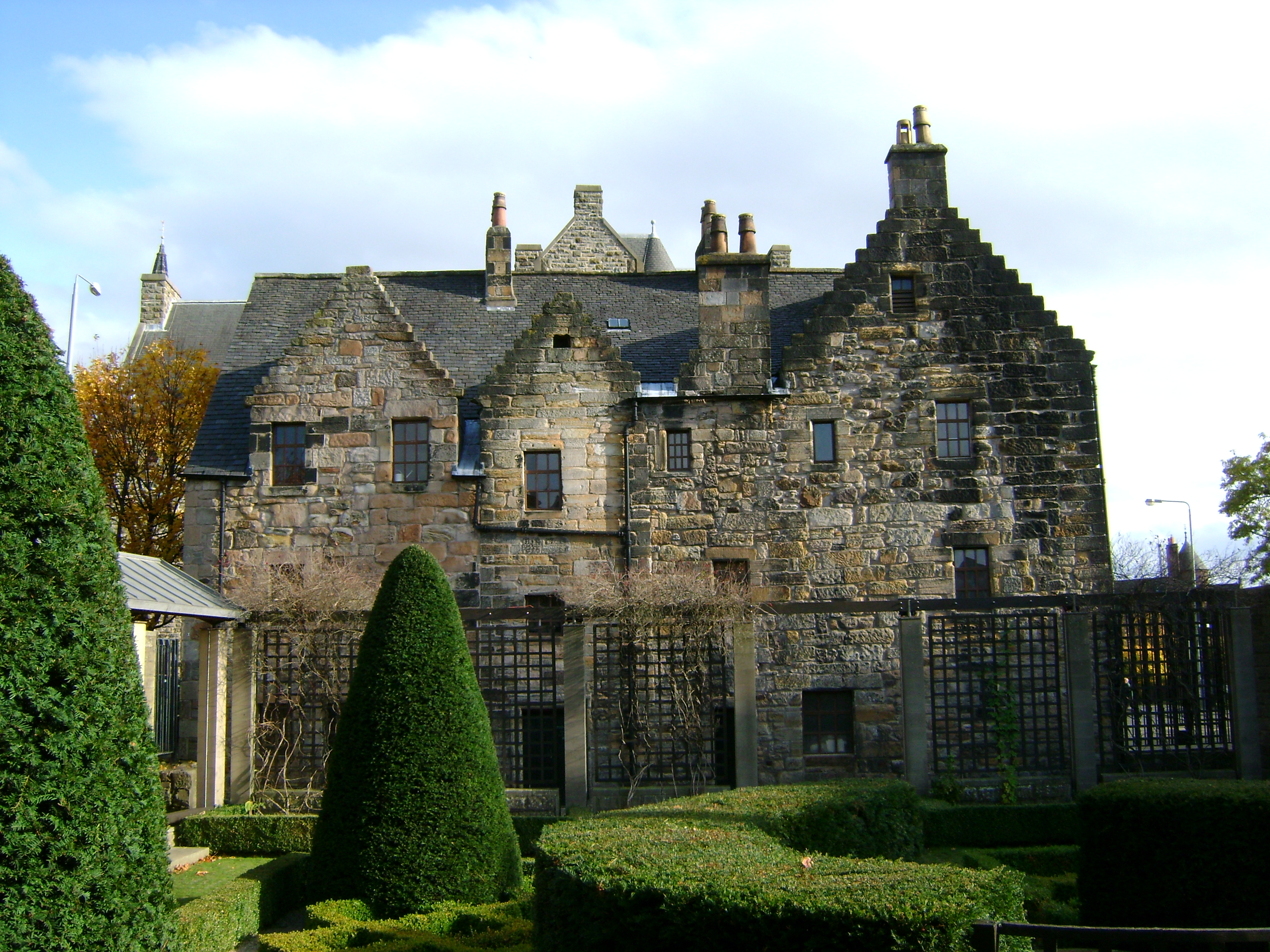
The rear of Provand's Lordship

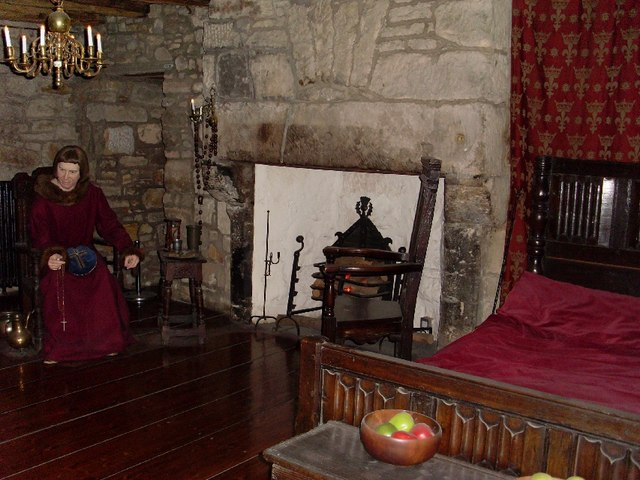
Interior of Provand's Lordship

Provand's Lordship is a medieval historic house museum in Glasgow, Scotland. It is in the Townhead area, at the top of Castle Street within sight of Glasgow Cathedral and next to the St Mungo Museum of Religious Life and Art.

== History ==
Provand's Lordship was built as part of St Nicholas's Hospital by Andrew Muirhead, Bishop of Glasgow, in 1471. A western extension, designed by William Bryson, was completed in 1670.

In the 19th century it was acquired by the Morton Family who used it as a sweet shop. Following a generous donation from Sir William Burrell, in the form of cash as well a collection of seventeenth-century Scottish furniture in the late 1920s, the house was bought by the specially-formed Provand's Lordship Society, whose aim was to protect it. In 1978, the building was acquired by the City of Glasgow District Council who restored it.

It was reopened to the public in 1983, and, following further restoration work which lasted two years, re-opened again in 2000. In 2022-4 it received a further restoration, including coating in roughcast render which Glasgow Life said better reflected its 15th-century appearance as well as protecting the building.

== See also ==
- Provan Hall, another 15th-century historic building in Glasgow.
- Bishop Dunbar's Hospital, the hospital in Old Aberdeen founded by Gavin Dunbar.
