= Garthamlock =

Coordinates: 55.872047°N 4.144767°W

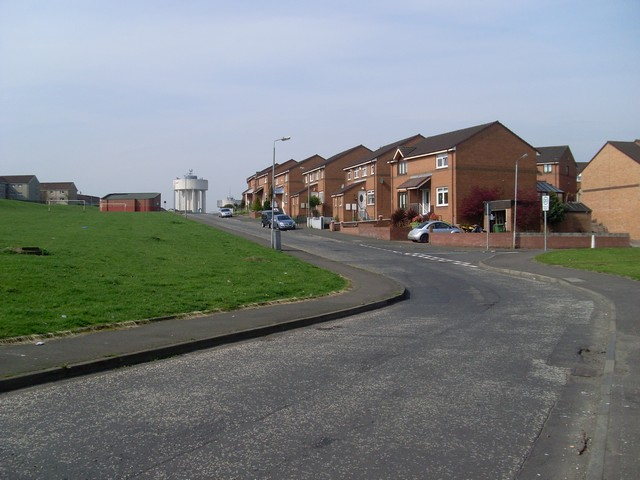
- Tillycairn Road (2009)

- Location within Glasgow
- OS grid reference: NS659664
- Council area: Glasgow City Council
- Lieutenancy area: Glasgow
- Country: Scotland
- Sovereign state: United Kingdom
- Post town: GLASGOW
- Postcode district: G33 5
- Dialling code: 0141
- Police: Scotland
- Fire: Scottish
- Ambulance: Scottish
- UK Parliament: Glasgow East
- Scottish Parliament: Glasgow Provan

Garthamlock (from the Gaelic "Gart Thamhlachd"-burial enclosure) is a suburb in the north-east of the Scottish city of Glasgow. It is situated north of the River Clyde. Provanhall is the nearest neighbourhood to the east; Craigend is directly to the west, with Hogganfield Park and Ruchazie beyond. Garthamlock is separated from Cranhill and Queenslie to the south by the M8 motorway (Junction 11 of which directly serves the area). An area of open ground (Cardowan Moss nature reserve) is to the north. The local landmarks are two water towers, which are illuminated at night.

Garthamlock was developed from 1954 onwards as part of the 'Greater Easterhouse' rehousing scheme after the city bought the estate of Garthamlock House; the house was demolished in 1955 to make way for a new secondary school (which itself closed in the 1990s). After many of the original tenements were demolished from the 1980s onwards, the area is now a mix of local authority housing and private stock, particularly following the construction of a major private development (The Beeches) by Persimmon Homes in the 2010s.

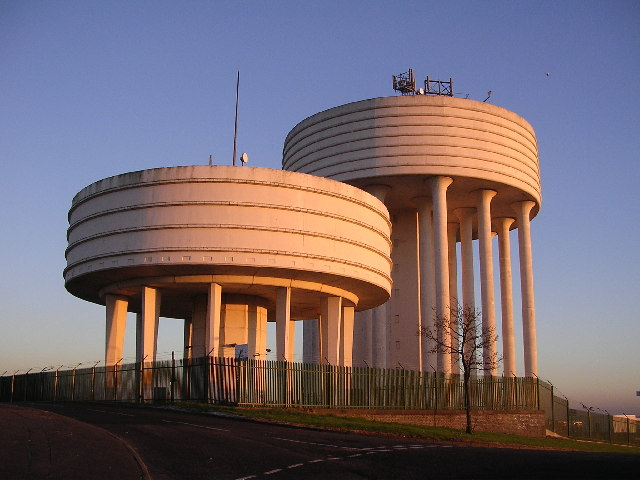
Craigend and Garthamlock water towers

The Glasgow Fort shopping centre was built to the east of Garthamlock, partly on a disused quarry and partly on the grounds of Provan Hall House and Park (Easterhouse).

In 2016, Glasgow City Council outlined masterplans for the development of the Greater Easterhouse area (including Garthamlock) over the next 20 years.
