= Easterhouse =

Housing estate and suburb of Glasgow, Scotland

Coordinates: 55.867667°N 4.108667°W

Easterhouse: Scottish Gaelic: Am Baile Sear; Scots: Easterhoose / Eisterhoose
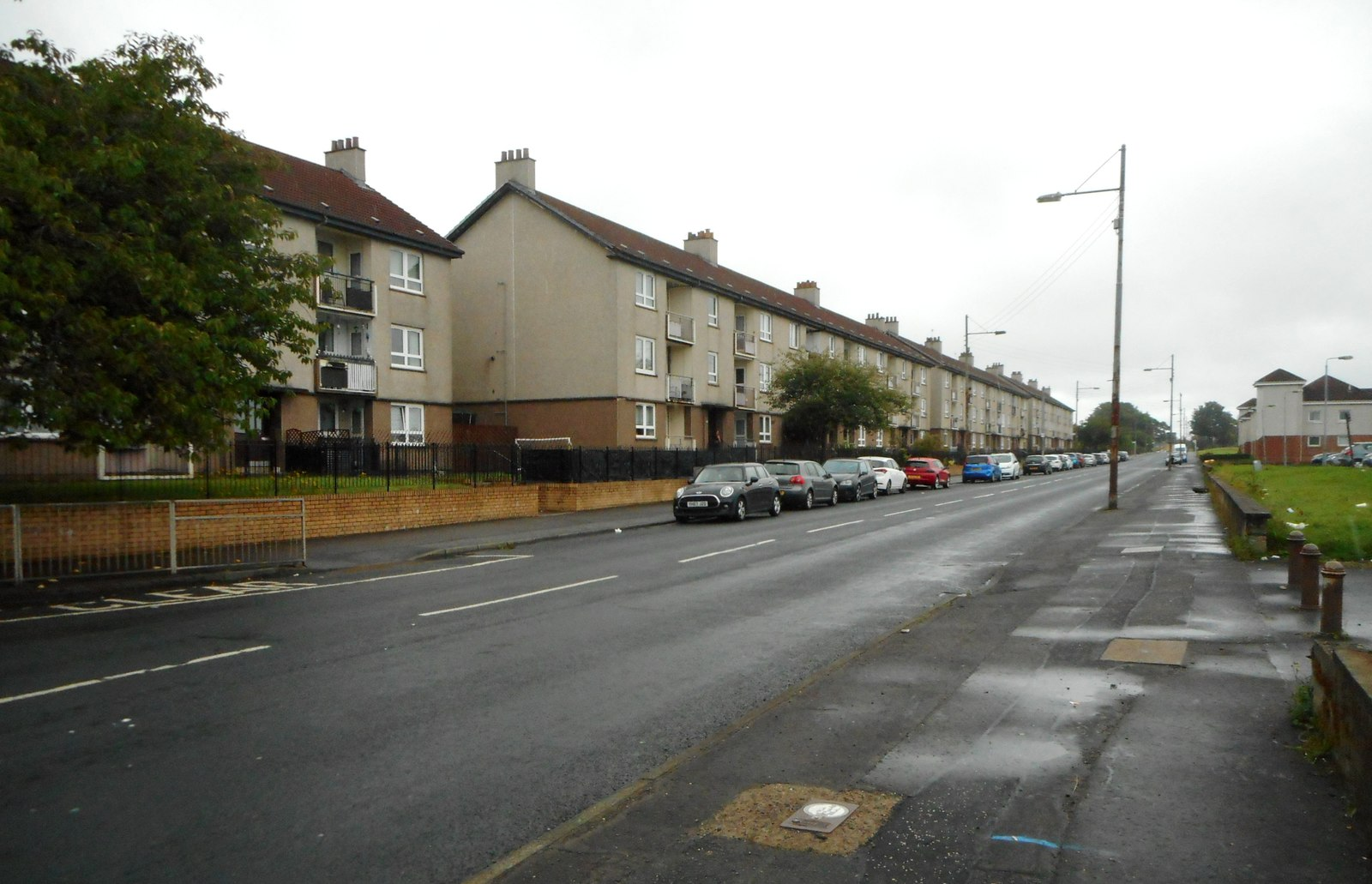
- Photographed in 2018, these buildings on Westerhouse Road were among few from the original estate not to have been significantly altered externally or demolished

- Location within Glasgow
- Area: 11 km^{2} (4.2 sq mi)
- Population: 8,923 (2011 Census)
  - Density: 811/km^{2} (2,100/sq mi)
- OS grid reference: NS681662
- Council area: Glasgow
- Lieutenancy area: Glasgow
- Country: Scotland
- Sovereign state: United Kingdom
- Post town: Glasgow
- Postcode district: G34
- Dialling code: 0141 771/773
- Police: Scotland
- Fire: Scottish
- Ambulance: Scottish
- UK Parliament: Glasgow East
- Scottish Parliament: Glasgow Provan

Easterhouse is a suburb of Glasgow, Scotland, six miles (ten kilometres) east of the city centre on land gained from the county of Lanarkshire as part of an expansion of Glasgow before the Second World War. The area is on high ground north of the River Clyde and south of the River Kelvin and Campsie Fells.

Building began in the mid-1950s to provide better housing for people in the East End living in sub-standard conditions. At the 2001 Census, its population was 26,495.

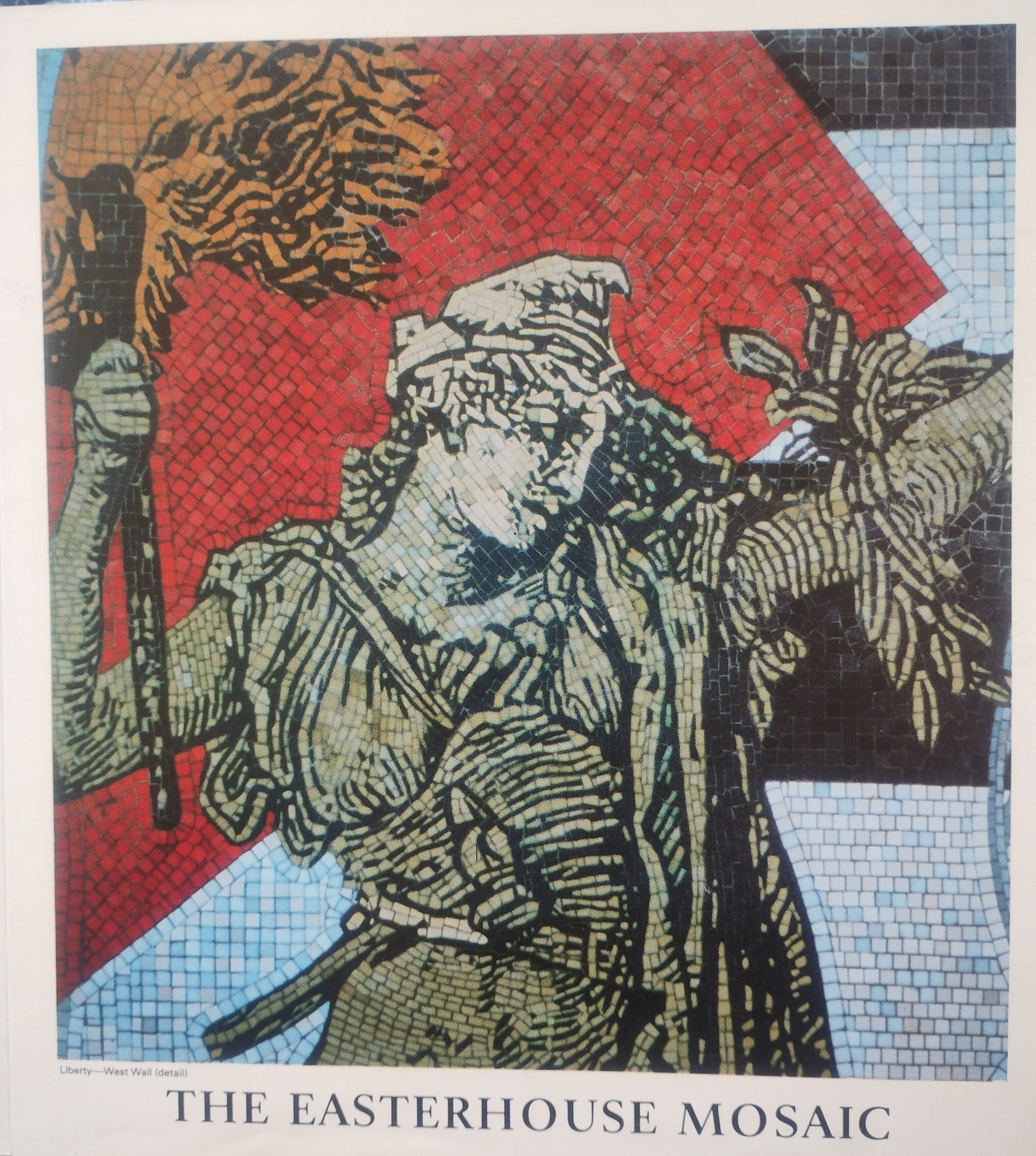
"Pond Scene" - (East Wall detail of The Easterhouse Mosaic) Photo is from brochure made on the mosaic's completion. "Liberty" - (West Wall detail of The Easterhouse Mosaic) Photo is from brochure made on the mosaic's completion.

Neighbourhoods of Easterhouse include Provanhall, Kildermorie, Lochend, Rogerfield and Commonhead, as well as Wellhouse, Easthall and Queenslie which are separated from the other parts by the M8 motorway running east–west through the area. The nearby communities of Barlanark, Craigend, Cranhill, Garthamlock and Ruchazie were constructed using the same building principles and have suffered from similar problems.

== History of the area ==
The remains of crannogs from the Iron Age were found in Bishop Loch, dating from around 700 BC by an archaeological dig in 1898. The Bishops of Glasgow were granted the land on which much of modern Easterhouse was built when the church of Glasgow was elevated into a bishopric in the 12th century. The remains of the Bishop of Glasgow's country palace have been revealed by the West of Scotland Archaeology Service next to Bishops Loch (a Site of Special Scientific Interest (SSSI)) at Lochwood. The palace was called Lochwood Castle and was demolished after the reformation to build a mausoleum at nearby Bedlay Castle, which was in turn dismantled and the stones reused as a lodge in the early nineteenth century. Local oral history talks of the Bishops of Glasgow sailing in a Venetian gondola from Glasgow Cathedral to his palace at Bishops Loch. Hogganfield Loch is the source of the Molindinar Burn next to the Cathedral, so some truth may lie in this claim.

The Forestry Commission administers land around Easterhouse under the name 'Bishops Estate', thus maintaining a link to the medieval bishops.

The far western and far northern parts of modern-day Easterhouse are believed to have been administered by the prebends of Barlanark, called the 'Lands of Provan' but the boundaries of this has never been accurately defined. The 15th century mansion house, Provan Hall, is a reminder of this ecclesiastical Pre-Reformation Papal administration.

The southern and eastern parts of the area, Bartiebeith, Blairtummock, Dungeonhill, Easterhouse, Hallhill, Netherhouse and Commonhead were also part of the Bishopric although granted by Malcolm IV to the Monks of Newbattle a little after 1162 in an unnamed charter by permission of Bishop Herbert of the See of Glasgow. The lands remained under the monks until 1268 when Bishop John de Cheam (Cheyam) redeemed the 'lands along the Clud' (Clyde) called Kermyl (Carmyle) - most of the area now comprising modern Easterhouse were included in this grant - to sustain three chaplains to 'minister for the salvation of the Bishop's soul and also for the souls of all the faithful deceased'.

=== Easterhouse village and the origin of name ===
In Timothy Pont's map and manuscript of 1596 the area where the late 19th century village of Easterhouse later developed was called 'Conflat'. Variations of this name are contained in the rental book of the Baronie de Glasgow (1513–1570) when it is recorded that one 'Johannes Woyd (John Wood) was rentaller of the 18s 8d land of Conflattis. The William Forrest map of 1816 calls the area of the old village Wamnat. Like the nearby village of Whifflet, now in Coatbridge, the term conflat derived from corn/wheat flats - flat land where wheat was farmed.

The village of Easterhouse was built from the late 19th century in land owned by, and south of, a farm of that name, in the immediate area around where Easterhouse railway station stands. The village was bounded to the north by the Monkland Canal and to the south, almost continuously with, the village of Swinton. Contrary to the stained glass window in Morrisons, Glasgow Fort, the villagers worked in a number of industries including the canal, the stone quarry at Auchinlea, coal mines at Gartloch and Baillieston but mainly in the surrounding farms and estates as agricultural workers.

Some cottages and other buildings (now a public house) can still be found on and adjacent to Easterhouse Road that were part of the 19th century village of Easterhouse. A modern corruption of the ancient Conflats name can be seen at Whamflet Avenue in Easterhouse village.

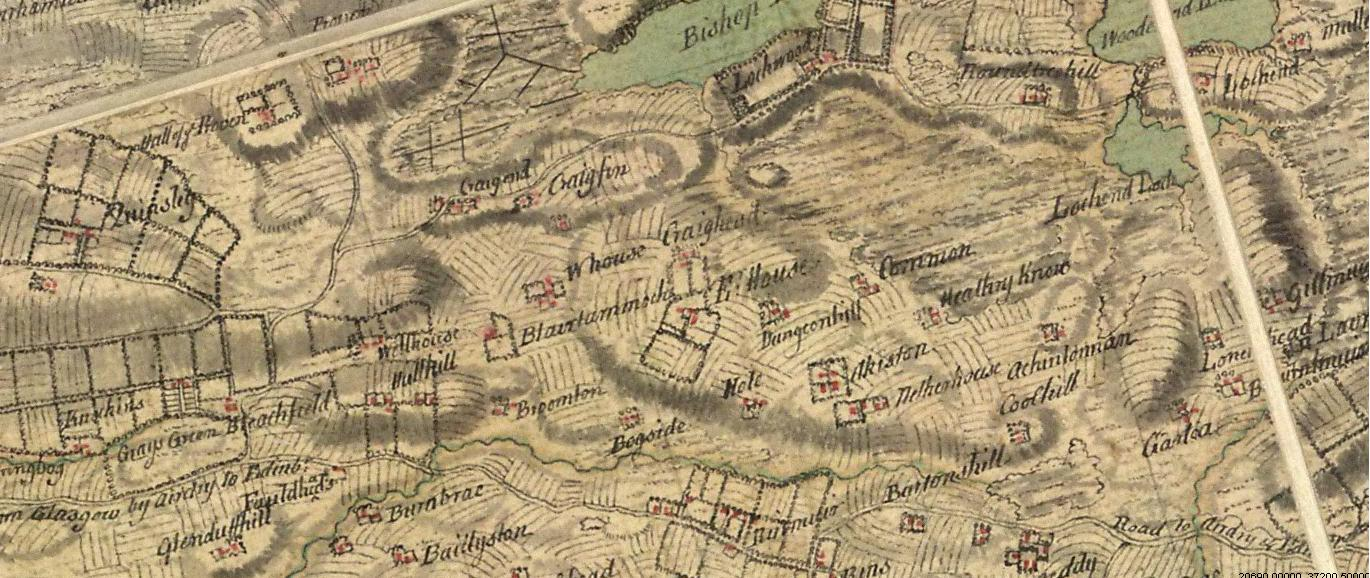
Map of the Easterhouse area in the William Roy map (1747-1755). Bishops, Lochend and Woodend Lochs are shown to the top and right. Easterhouse, Westerhouse, Dungeonhill, Netherhouse and Heathetyknow farms are shown. Lochwood, Provan, Blairtummock and Barlanark estates are also clearly shown. Lochwood is the site of the original bishops palace. Gartloch and Garthamlock are all named after the garden from this palace

The village's name was derived from Easterhouse Farm. Easterhouse farm was opposite (to the east) to the farm called Westerhouse. Easterhouse farm was located on what is now Millennium Court and Westerhouse near where Errogie Street now stands (off Westerhouse Road). A small group of remaining trees are still present lead to the site of the farm buildings. Other farms in the area included Westerhouse, Netherhouse and Dungeonhill farms, these names are still found in local street names). Other farms, villages and country estates included West Maryston (or Merryston), Queenslie Farm, Netherhouse, Provanhall, Blairtummock and Lochwood.

== Housing and the modern estate ==
Large-scale building commenced in the mid-1950s by the Corporation of Glasgow, replacing farms and country estates, to provide housing for city residents living in sub-standard accommodation in the city. The old village of Easterhouse was not developed with the new estate and declined. The old railway station was demolished (later replaced with a modern station building), together with a small number of the houses.

The 1950s-1970s housing was an improvement from the tightly packed tenements that many people moved to Easterhouse from. These tenemented dwellings had double bedrooms and interior bathrooms with a lavatory. The population peaked at over 56,843 in the early 1960s and is now around 26,000. The 2008 Scottish Public Health Observatory report on life expectancy, smoking levels and unemployment show that Easterhouse had lower levels of life expectancy and higher levels of smoking and unemployment levels than Scotland, though both of the latter were falling by large percentages.

The 100,000th council home to be built in Glasgow was part of a three-storey block of flats in Carriden Place, Easterhouse; it was completed in 1965, 46 years after the first council houses in Glasgow.

Easterhouse, along with other large housing projects built at that time by Glasgow Corporation, came to prominence in the wider world through its social problems and became a case study for social planners hoping to avoid the same types of problems. For example, the lack of basic amenities, such as shops, sports, other recreational grounds, such as cinemas and poor transport links.

Housing was mainly of the two/three bedroom tenement type, off a common close. The lack of variety of housing types, such as detached and semi-detached house types created a somewhat monotonous and bland townscape. This along with a lack of any stable pre-existing community structure and unemployment in the area contributed to the rise of youth gang culture. This became so notorious in the 1960s that celebrities including Frankie Vaughan became involved in community issues in an attempt to bring order and attract resources to the area. The late 1960s and 1970s saw the construction of a large indoor shopping centre, later named Shandwick Square, local area shops, Easterhouse Library, pool and community centre, local schools (both primary and secondary) churches and in the early 1980s, the health centre (GP surgery and dentist).

Since the early 1980s, Glasgow City Council and more recently Glasgow Housing Association began a programme of renovation, demolition and refurbishment of the housing stock, replacing the old style tenement housing with detached and semi-detached houses. This has attracted significant amount of privately owned property and investment into the area, including the provision of better transport links and amenities. Housing is now mainly under local housing associations such as Provanhall, Easthall Park, Blairtummock and Bishops Wood.

In 2016, Glasgow City Council outlined masterplans for the development of the Greater Easterhouse area over the next 20 years.

=== Reputation and social problems ===
For many years, Easterhouse has had a poor reputation in Scotland and the UK as a whole. This is partly due to riots in the 1970s that started there and spread to surrounding areas.

The crime problems in Easterhouse and many surrounding areas in Glasgow's East End are often associated with "Ned culture". Easterhouse was infamous for having a gang problem; these were not organised crime groups, and many members stated that there were no leaders, no money and no narcotics involved and the regular fighting between them, often fuelled by alcohol and involving dozens of participants on each side, was purely territorial, a problem in most working-class areas of Glasgow, although perhaps more prominent in Easterhouse than anywhere else. The gangs were formed by unemployed teens and young adults who complained that there was nothing to do in the area, so drinking would go on throughout the day until erupting into violence at night. It was reported in 2006 that there were about sixteen gangs from different neighbourhoods in a 6 1/2-mile (10.5-kilometre) radius, and they would remain in 'their' streets as much as possible to avoid being targeted individually by enemies, gang affiliations often passing from parent to child. This led to pervading isolation, territorialism, cycles of seeking revenge for past incidents and general acceptance of violence as inevitable, continuing through the generations. In the early 21st century various methods have been used in an effort to reduce the violence and prevent the patterns of gang culture repeating itself, which have been successful to a large extent in terms of eliminating the territorialism: the different neighbourhoods are still sometimes referred to by their gang terms but the territories are no longer habitually 'defended' from rivals by the local teenagers.

Drugs are also a problem in the area, as many people have died of drug-related causes, most notably of heroin overdoses. However, a charity formed in 1991 called "GEAAP" (Greater Easterhouse Alcohol Awareness Programme) has tried to improve the alcohol problems in the area. Their main aims are to get any child victim of alcohol abuse to speak out, which they have done by collaborating with local schools, such as Bannerman High School; another important part of the charity is to help alcoholics overcome their addiction.

== Architecture ==
Auchinlea and Blairtummock parks both contain listed mansion houses.

Provan Hall (or Provanhall), a category A listed building owned by the National Trust for Scotland is the best-preserved medieval fortified country house in Scotland. The house stands on its own grounds on the edge of Auchinlea Park. The building dates from before 1460 and is one of the oldest in the Glasgow area. The original doors lead into the kitchen, a dairy and a hallway. The kitchen boasts a fireplace capable of roasting an ox and has one of the finest examples in Scotland of a Roman style barrel vaulted ceiling. The cross vaulting in the dairy ceiling is medieval. On the upper floor, the dining hall contains an ancient oak table and dumbwaiter. There is a collection of historic chimney pieces. The hall may have been visited by Mary, Queen of Scots while her husband, Lord Darnley was ill in St. Nicholas Hospital (Provand's Lordship) in the late 16th century.

Provan Hall has a boundary wall dating from 1647. The coat of arms of the Hamilton family, which at that time owned the estate, is found above the entrance arch of that wall. Across the courtyard to the south is Blochairn House, which today is occupied by the Greater Easterhouse Environmental Trust. Thought to have been built around 1450 Blochairn House was remodelled in 1760 by John Buchanan, a Tobacco Lord, to resemble the plantation house on his Jamaican tobacco estate. Both Blochairn and Provanhall are category A listed by Historic Scotland (1970). The houses were served by the now Provanhall Loch, now artificially banked and part of Provanhall Park. A formal parterre garden is to the north of both listed buildings. Provanhall is now the headquarters of the local preservation trust.

Blairtummock House and adjoining walled garden and garden house is category B listed (1990). The garden pavilion was created from a demolished Robert Adam house on Queen Street, Glasgow. The house was built in at least five phases, late medieval (1580s), Georgian (1721), Victorian (1830s) and minor alterations in the 1960s and early 2000s. The name Blairtummock comes from Scottish Gaelic blair meaning flat area and tummock meaning hillock, so a flat area on top of a small hill. This describes the Easterhouse area as a whole: the raised area Strathkelvin drops into Strathclyde.

As the house was enlarged, the farm land surrounding the house was developed into an estate and when the Blairtummock estate and house was purchased from the Lamberton family in 1954, for development of housing, it consisted of 103 acres (0.42 km^{2}). The Lamberton family owned the Lamberton and Co Ltd engineering steel works in Coatbridge. The Lamberton and Co Ltd works (from 1870) are now listed buildings themselves. The house and gardens were restored in 2008–09, partly as offices by the GEDC (architects, Simpson and Brown, 2006). The restored building includes a modern extension replacing the 1960s alterations, so adding a fifth phase of building. The walled gardens have had the original parterre restored. The tree-lined driveway to the house has been resurfaced and additional planting has restored the parkland setting of the house.

St Benedict's Church (Gillespie, Kidd & Coia 1962-65) is a prominent example of modernism. It was category B listed in 1994 together with the adjoining Presbytery The church was renovated in 2005–06, given a new copper roof and function rooms. The church was built on the site of Craigend Cottage. The woodland surrounding the church, Craigend Wood, is named after this cottage and farm.

Other modern architecture includes the Easterhouse Health Centre (Davis Duncan Architects (Archial), 2002), The Bridge (Gareth Hosins Architects, 2004), Wellhouse Community Centre (Chris Stewart Architects, 2004) and a new College building.

The Bridge was short-listed in the RIAS Awards, and won the Design Award from the Glasgow Institute of Architects. The complex was highly commended at the Scottish Urban Regeneration Forum awards in the Partnership category. It was constructed over the waste ground which lay between John Wheatley College's new campus, opened in 2001, and the Easterhouse Pool, realising local ambitions for a 'cultural campus', including Visual Statement (Dance Company), Scottish National Youth Theatre and district Library, and forms an extension to the Easterhouse campus of Glasgow Kelvin College (which absorbed John Wheatley College in 2013), housing some its recording facilities.

There is a large amount of unoccupied waste ground in the area which was previously occupied by demolished tenements and is yet to be reused.

== Sports ==
Easterhouse Panthers are a rugby league team based in the area.

== Amenities ==
Leisure facilities include the swimming pool, library, and Platform arts centre in The Bridge, a separate sports centre near to Provanhall which opened in 1990, and sports pitches and Hall for community use at Lochend High School. The district has a resident artist, sponsored by the Scottish Arts Council, with the first being Katy Dove in 2013.

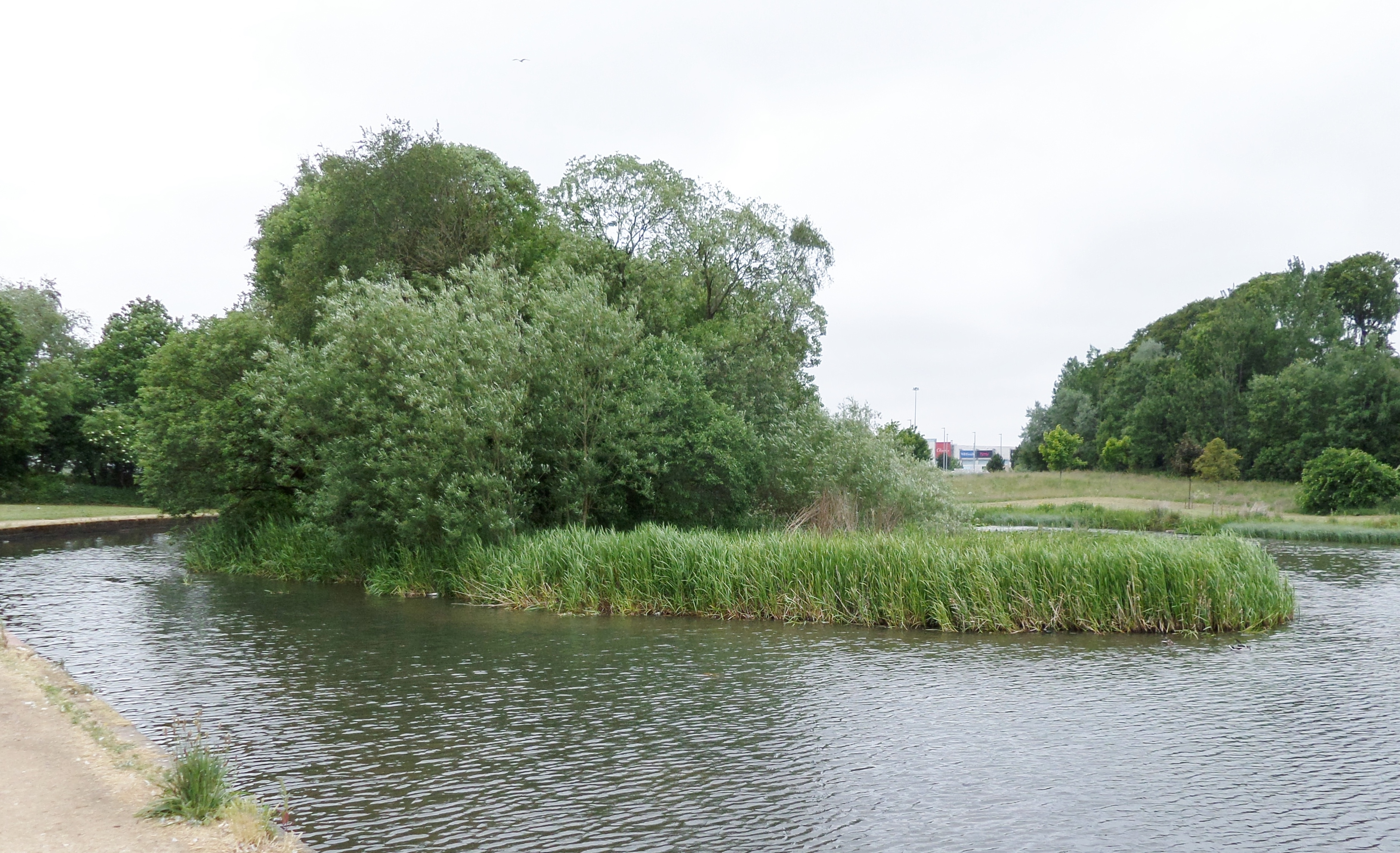
Auchinlea Park

Local parks include Blairtummock and Provanhall. Bishopswood is a local nature reserve and SSI. Drumpellier Country Park lies to the east of the estate in North Lanarkshire. The surrounding countryside includes eleven sites of SSI and local nature reserves, including Craigend Moss, Todds Well, Bishops Loch LNR and Gartloch woods. Other waterways and country parks around the area include Lochend Loch, Woodend Loch, Hogganfield Loch and Drumpellier Country Park. (bought together as the Seven Lochs Wetland Park).

The core area is served by three primary schools - Provanhall, Oakwood and St. Benedict's - and one secondary school, Lochend Community High School, which moved to new buildings in 2002. The number of educational facilities has decreased markedly in line with the falling population: there were once 22 primary schools and four secondary schools in the wider area. Fire service (1964, refurbished 2007) and police (1973) stations covering the north-east of Glasgow are based in the centre of Easterhouse.

Shopping areas include the Glasgow Fort, a large, semi-circular high street-style retail park on the western periphery of Easterhouse at Garthamlock which has many well-known high street stores, including Morrisons Scottish flagship supermarket, several restaurants and a cinema. The Fort has excellent transport links, being sited at junction 10 of the M8. There is a smaller shopping centre dating from the 1960s, previously known as Shandwick Square before being rebranded as The Lochs in 2018, with a McDonald's restaurant outside. Several small, village-style shopping areas are scattered throughout the suburb.

There are two business parks, Glasgow and Westwood. Glasgow Business Park was built to the west of the nineteenth century village. Queenslie has a large industrial park.

== Public art ==
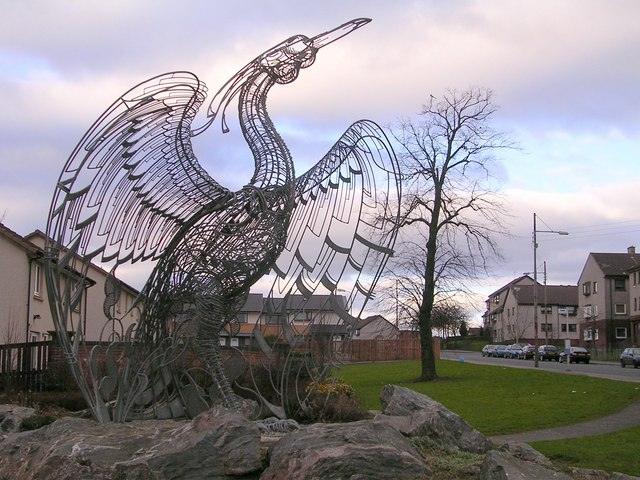
Easterhouse Phoenix

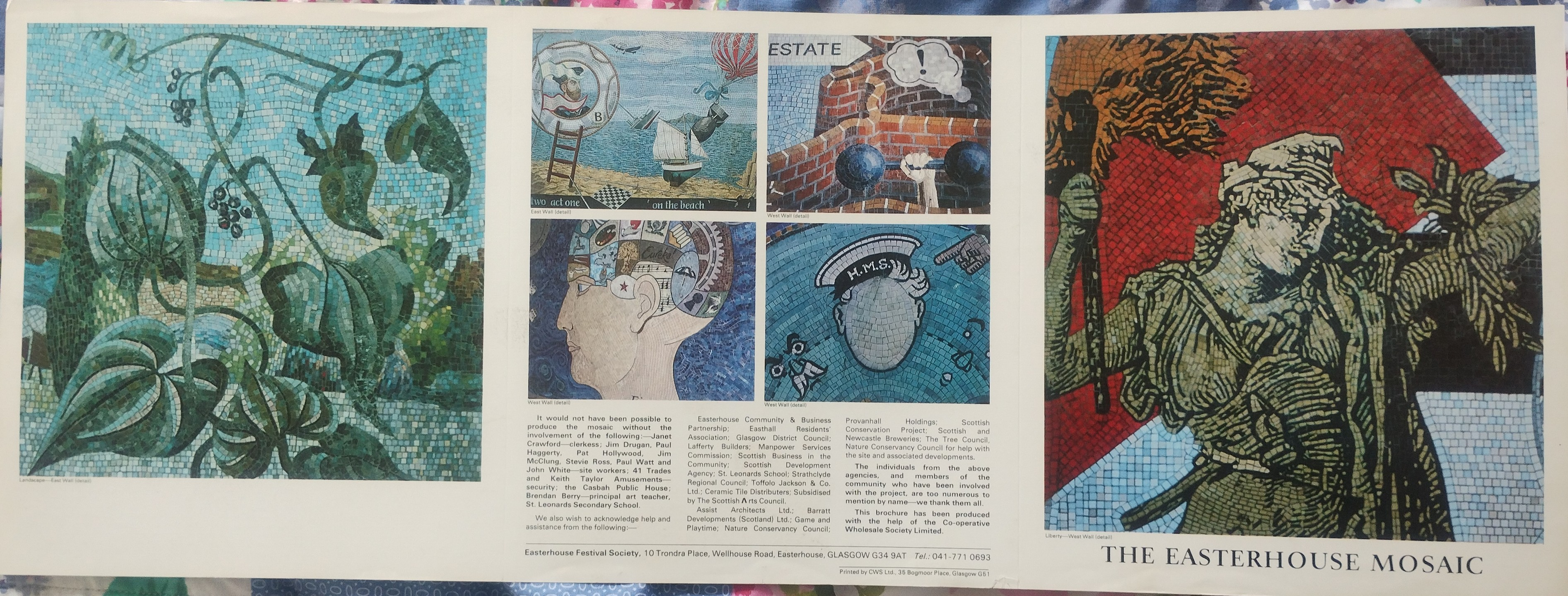
Photo of the Easterhouse Mosaic brochure.

Public art installations include a Clydesdale horse and a Phoenix sculpted from galvanized steel by Andy Scott. The Phoenix was designed to represent the regeneration of the area and is located in a prominent location on Easterhouse Road, in the grounds of the old Easterhouse Farm.

The Easterhouse mosaic was created in the early 1980s by the local community, co-ordinated by the revolutionary community arts organisation, Easterhouse Festival Society. The mosaic was located on Lochend Road. It covered 1,500 sq ft (140 m^{2}), making it (certainly at the time) the UK's biggest hand-made mural and one of the largest in Europe. See inserted photos of the brochure which also details The Easterhouse Mosaic's story, construction and makers. Easterhouse was one of Glasgow's most socially deprived areas and the brochure states that the mosaic would "vastly improve the physical environment as well as acting as a critique upon the social system that (has) created these conditions."

== Saint John Ogilvie ==
In 1967, Easterhouse resident, John Fagan, had an allegedly miraculous remission of stomach cancer after praying to then Blessed John Ogilvie. After investigation by the Catholic Church, John Ogilvie was canonised by Pope Paul VI in 1976, and he became Scotland's first saint since the reformation and for over 700 years.

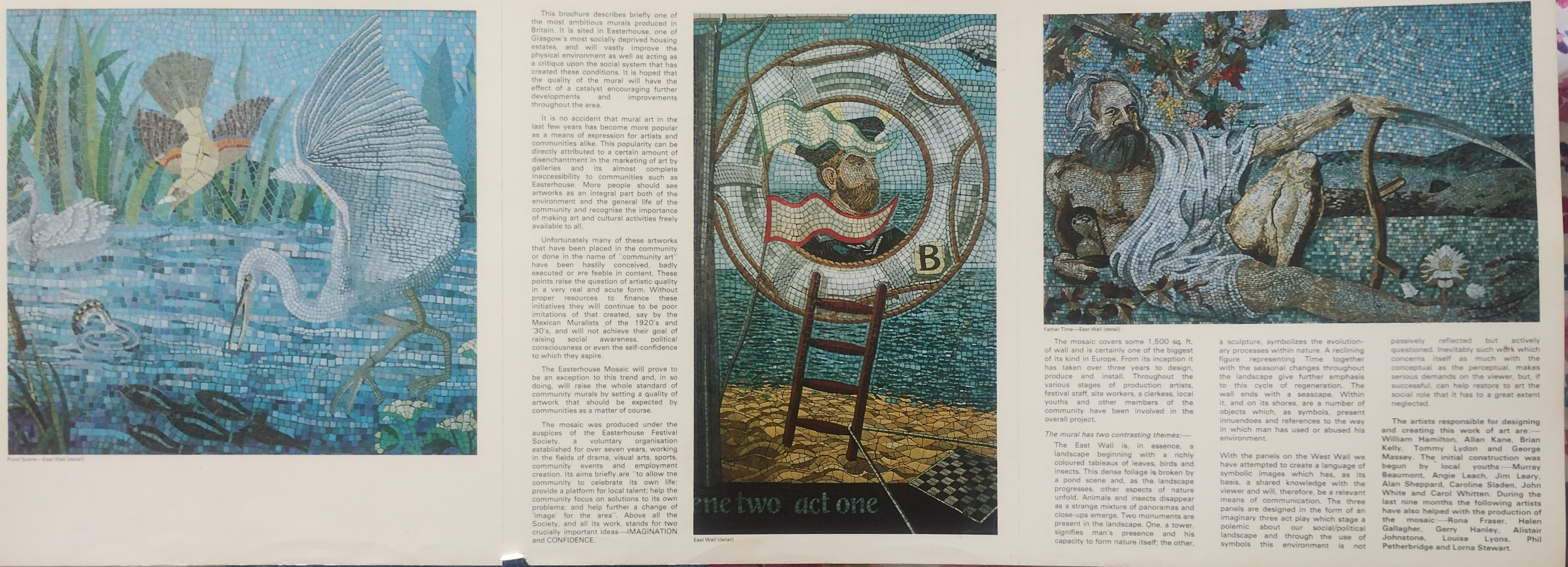
Photo of The Easterhouse Mosaic brochure (2)

== Notable residents ==
- Freddie Anderson, writer
- Paul Curran, opera director
- Graeme Dott, snooker player
- Tommy Flanagan, actor
- Gary Lewis, actor
- Ian McAteer, former gangster
- Callum McGregor, footballer for Celtic
- Christina McKelvie, politician
- Bobby Russell, footballer
- Tiger Tim Stevens, disc jockey
- Bobby Williamson, footballer/manager

== Bibliography ==
- The Rental Book of the Baronia de Glasgow, p. 47 pub. by the Grampian Club, London 1875
- History of Glasgow - Robert Renwick and Sir John Lindsay Vol.1
- New Monkland Parish - Its History, Industries and People - John McArthur, pub. 1881
