= Provanhall =

Coordinates: 55.87213°N 4.126740°W

- Location within Glasgow
- OS grid reference: NS667663
- Council area: Glasgow City Council
- Lieutenancy area: Glasgow
- Country: Scotland
- Sovereign state: United Kingdom
- Post town: GLASGOW
- Postcode district: G34
- Dialling code: 0141
- Police: Scotland
- Fire: Scottish
- Ambulance: Scottish
- UK Parliament: Glasgow East
- Scottish Parliament: Glasgow Baillieston; Glasgow

Provanhall is a neighbourhood of Easterhouse in east Glasgow, Scotland. It is named after the estate and medieval house, Provan Hall.

The area is to the immediate east of Provan Hall and Glasgow Fort shopping centre and to the north of Shandwick Square Shopping Centre. The area is bounded by Gartloch fields, part of Glasgow's greenbelt with North Lanarkshire. Part of the estate was built on the remains of Provan Loch, part of the kettle ponds in the area that feed the Molendinar burn that flows into the River Clyde in Glasgow.

== Background ==
As of March 2011, the Provanhall neighbourhood contained 688 properties.

In 2016, Glasgow City Council outlined masterplans for the development of the Greater Easterhouse area (including Provanhall) over the next 20 years.
