= Barlanark =

District of Glasgow, Scotland

Coordinates: 55.8559°N 4.1375°W

Barlanark: Scottish Gaelic: Bàrr Lannraig
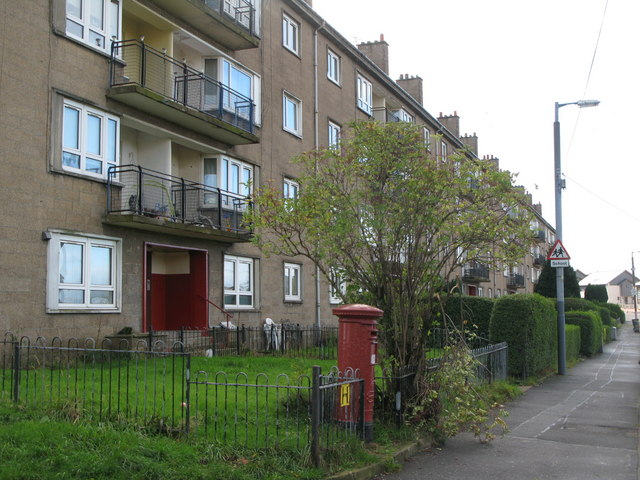
- Four-storey tenement flats on Garvel Road showing original 1950s appearance, 2010 (since renovated)

- Location within the Glasgow City council area Location within Scotland
- Population: 3,800
- OS grid reference: NS663646
- Council area: Glasgow City
- Lieutenancy area: Glasgow
- Country: Scotland
- Sovereign state: United Kingdom
- Post town: GLASGOW
- Postcode district: G33 4
- Dialling code: 0141
- Police: Scotland
- Fire: Scottish
- Ambulance: Scottish
- UK Parliament: Glasgow East
- Scottish Parliament: Glasgow Shettleston

Barlanark (/ˌbɑːrˈlɑːnərk/ bar-LAH-nərk) is a district in Glasgow. It is situated east of Budhill, Shettleston and Springboig, north west of Baillieston, west of Springhill and Swinton and south of Easthall, Easterhouse and Wellhouse.

== Name ==
The name Barlanark is an apparently hybrid Gaelic-Brythonic name suggesting the hill at the clearing from the Gaelic bàrr and Brythonic lanerc meaning "clearing". The first element may represent a Gaelicisation of Brythonic *baɣeδ, 'boar' (Welsh baedd).

== History ==
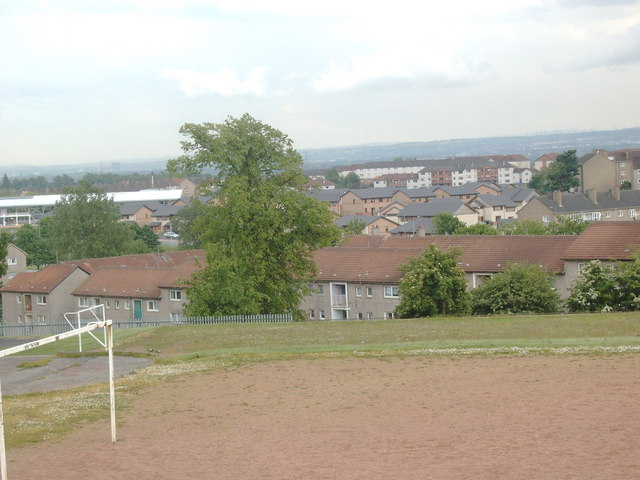
View looking south over Barlanark from Wellhouse, 2007

Barlanark housing scheme was developed in response to the city's grave post-war housing needs: In 1952/53 over 2,300 3- and 4-bedroom apartments were constructed and rented out to 'Corporation' tenants. There were also 5-apartment semi-detached houses, and 3-apartment terraced houses built, next to the Estate of Barlanark House, which was constructed by David Hamilton in 1822, demolished in 1954 (a playpark now stands on the site).

=== Community Development ===
The Calvay Centre opened in 2007, replacing the block of flats and shopping area. The centre has a 12-place IT Suite as part of the John Wheatley Learning Network, a 24-place nursery operated by Glasgow East Regeneration Agency, and a family centre operated by Quarriers. The centre is used to provide services for the local community and to offer meeting spaces for local groups and organisations including a church.

The social housing stock in the area is managed by two housing associations, Calvay covering the northern neighbourhood and Gardeen covering the south. Both clusters contain renovated tenements and modern housing and have their own local shops and community facility. A development of private housing, Earlybraes was added in the late 2010s, located between two cemeteries, the municipally owned Sandymount (which includes Muslim and Jewish sections) and the Glasgow Hebrew Burial Society's dedicated Glenduffhill facility.

In 2016, Glasgow City Council outlined masterplans for the development of the Greater Easterhouse area (including Barlanark) over the next 20 years.

== Notable natives ==
- Stephen Dobbie, footballer
- Graham Dorrans, footballer
- Pat Fairley The Marmalade, musician
- Danny McGrain, footballer (1953–2004)
