= Glasgow Fort =

Glasgow Fort Shopping Centre
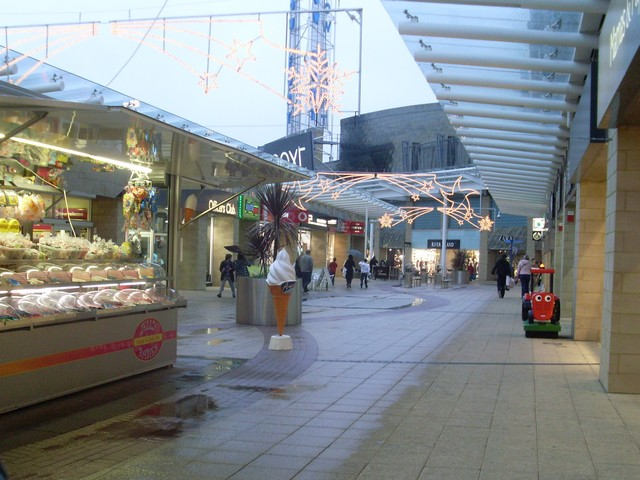
- Glasgow Fort in 2009
- Location: Glasgow, Scotland, Garthamlock
- Coordinates: 55.87122°N 4.1367°W
- Address: Glasgow Fort, Junction 10 M8
- Opened: 2004
- Developer: Pillar Property plc and Capital & Regional plc
- Owner: British Land
- Architect: Cooper Cromar
- Num. of stores: 93
- Num. of anchor tenants: 5
- Floor area: 506,218 sq ft (47,029.2 m^{2})
- Parking: 2,600 spaces
- Website: glasgowfort.com

Glasgow Fort is a large out-of-town shopping and leisure park in Glasgow, Scotland, just off Junction 10 of the M8 motorway which runs to the south, surrounded by the residential areas of Provanhall, Garthamlock and Easterhouse. It was opened in 2004 built on land which had been part of Auchinlea Park (previously the site of two quarries) which still exists to its immediate east.

== Description ==
The concept is unusual when compared to other local out-of-town shopping centres such as Braehead and Silverburn, in that it is uncovered and therefore the spaces between units are open to the elements, therefore technically categorising it as a retail park. The design of the area incorporates a "two-sided mall design" intended to recreate a traditional high street.

The scheme opened in October 2004 with Phase 1 of the development providing 390,946 sq ft (36,320.1 m^{2}) of retail accommodation. There are currently over 100 retail units and two additional kiosks. Retail range in size from small single floor 570 sq ft (53 sq m) spaces to large multi-floor units that are over 22,000 sq ft (2,000 m^{2}) in size. There are approximately 2,500 car parking spaces for the park. In 2016, a new multi-storey car park opened with over 600 spaces in it.

From 2012 to 2013, an extension to Glasgow Fort Shopping was under construction. It opened in October 2013, with hundreds of Glaswegians attending the grand opening. The extension included five new restaurants: Chiquito; Prezzo; Wagamama; TGI Friday's and Harvester, alongside an eight-screen Vue Cinema.

Between 2014 and 2015, another large extension began. With various new restaurants, shops and a large Marks and Spencer, the extension opened in late 2015.

== Transport ==
Buses and trains run regularly to Easterhouse railway station (2 miles away) from Glasgow City Centre, in addition to buses from the city to the complex, making Glasgow Fort easily accessible by public transport.
