= Ruchazie =

Coordinates: 55.8707°N 4.1687°W

- Location within Glasgow
- OS grid reference: NS644663
- Council area: Glasgow City Council
- Lieutenancy area: Glasgow
- Country: Scotland
- Sovereign state: United Kingdom
- Post town: GLASGOW
- Postcode district: G33 3
- Dialling code: 0141 774
- Police: Scotland
- Fire: Scottish
- Ambulance: Scottish
- UK Parliament: Glasgow North East
- Scottish Parliament: Glasgow Easterhouse and Springburn

Ruchazie (/rʌxˈheɪzi/ rukh-HAY-zee) is a neighbourhood in the Scottish city of Glasgow. It is situated to the north-east of the city, bordered by Craigend and Garthamlock to the east and the open ground of Hogganfield Park and Lethamhill Golf Course to the north. Ruchazie is separated from Cranhill to the south and Riddrie to the west by the M8 motorway (Junctions 11 and 12 of which directly serve the area), previously the route of the Monkland Canal.

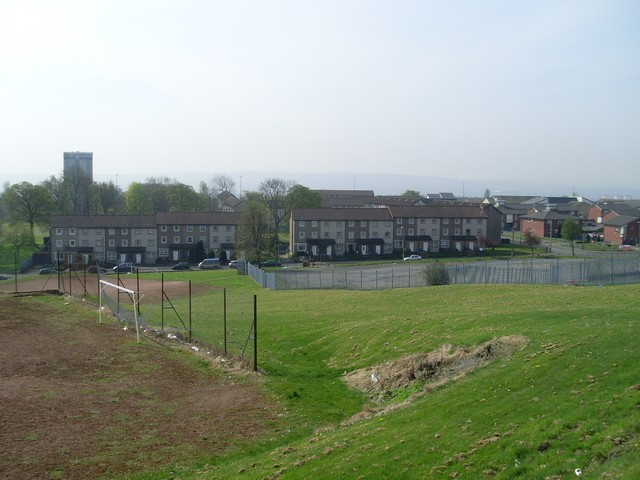
Ruchazie

A small hamlet existed in the area from at least the 18th to the mid-20th century near to the Gartcraig Colliery, located where the local housing office now stands. There was also a productive brick works at Gartcraig from the 1870s to the 1920s, and two country house estates, Croftcroighn and Craigend.

Developed for housing as part of the city's 'Greater Easterhouse' programme in the 1950s, mostly consisting of tenements, the neighbourhood was at the centre of the Glasgow Ice Cream Wars in the 1980s which culminated in the death of a local family when their flat was set on fire, and also suffered from the habitual territorial gang violence in the area, with rival 'young teams' not only from the surrounding schemes but within the fairly small Ruchazie itself, with a gang from each of its three clusters of streets. The area has experienced considerable regeneration and improvement in the early 21st century through Tower Homes LHO and Ruchazie Housing Association.

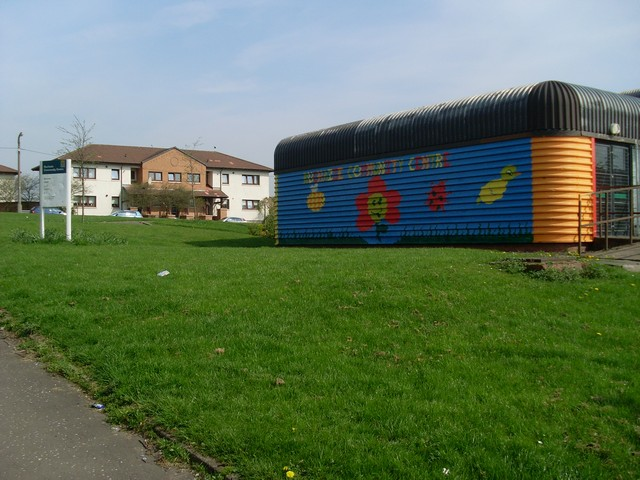
Ruchazie Community Centre

Ruchazie is the only district in Glasgow that does not have a public house. In August 2009, construction of a Soccerworld five-a-sides complex situated on ground between Croftcroighn Road and the M8 motorway (formerly Whitehill Secondary Former Pupils F.C. playing fields) was completed and opened to the public. The facility includes a soft play area, female-only gym and a licensed bar. There were two churches in the area: Ruchazie Parish Community Church and the Roman Catholic St Philip's, which closed in 2014. The local schools had already closed and been merged with others in the early 2000s.

Singer Jim Diamond grew up in ruchazie and attended St. Philips RC primary school .

In 2016, Glasgow City Council outlined masterplans for the development of the Greater Easterhouse area (including Ruchazie) over the next 20 years.
