= Riddrie =

District of Glasgow, Scotland

Coordinates: 55.871111°N 4.187778°W

Riddrie: Scottish Gaelic: An Ruadh Ruigh
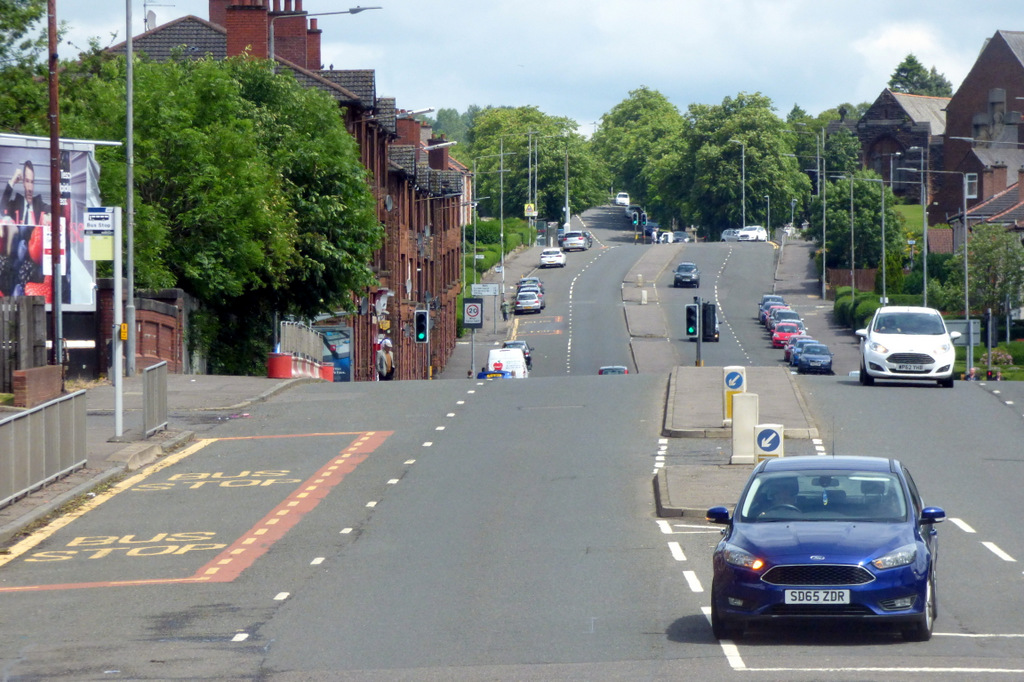
- Cumbernauld Road leading through Riddrie in 2018

- Location within Glasgow
- OS grid reference: NS6366
- Civil parish: Glasgow
- Council area: Glasgow City Council
- Lieutenancy area: Glasgow
- Country: Scotland
- Sovereign state: United Kingdom
- Post town: GLASGOW
- Postcode district: G33
- Dialling code: 0141
- Police: Scotland
- Fire: Scottish
- Ambulance: Scottish
- UK Parliament: Glasgow North East
- Scottish Parliament: Glasgow Provan

Riddrie (Scottish Gaelic: An Ruadh Ruigh) is a north-eastern district of Glasgow, Scotland. It lies on the A80 Cumbernauld Road.

== Location and amenities ==
Riddrie is a predominantly residential area consisting of 1920s or earlier semi-detached houses (especially in the area known as Riddrie Knowes), and some 1920s three-story tenement buildings containing multiple apartments. It is the location of Barlinnie prison. The area lies to the north east of the centre of Glasgow.

There is a Vogue bingo hall, library, bowling green and local shops. Bus services link Riddrie with Glasgow City Centre and Cumbernauld. Nearby is Hogganfield Loch, around which is a public park.

== Geology ==
Riddrie sits on limestone with a clay layer over it. This can be seen in the outcrops in the area where the limestone breaks through. There is a stone quarry in the grounds of HMP Barlinnie, which was used to create the War Memorial in Lee Avenue, according to its inscription. Limestone, a biochemical sedimentary rock, is in Riddrie of the Clackmannan Group Type. It dates from the Carboniferous Period and specifically to 318 to 328 million years ago. Coal seams in the immediate area to the east were considered commercially exploitable from the late eighteenth century onwards once the canal had been built. Under Riddrie Knowes there is a sill of volcanic rock, and Glasgow and its environs are much affected by patterns of Ice Age melt.

== History ==
=== Canal and motorway proximity ===
The former Monkland Canal to the immediate north of modern Riddrie was begun by James Watt in June 1770 as the first stage of a plan to allow transport of coal to the centre of Glasgow. One of its water sources was Hogganfield Loch. The canal's commercial development had by 1792 allowed coal exploitation close to its route to grow. The first half of the 19th century saw this use intensify with the opening of ironworks in Coatbridge. Both shallow and deep coalmining took place close to and under Riddrie. The Monkland Canal traffic was close by. In the late 18th century, there was a drawbridge at Riddrie where coal was sold at competitive rates. The last deep workings in the area closed in 1931. Mine workings under Riddrie have become unstable in heavy rain, leading to the collapse of ground in Riddrie Park Cemetery.

By the 1920s, the abandoned canal waterway had become a public danger, resulting in Riddrie children drowning, and has been described as a source of "continuous outcry" from residents. The canal was eventually filled in the 1960s and is now the M8 motorway with the exit for Riddrie at Junction 12. Riddrie was a significant point in the M8 project. In 1978, the section from Riddrie to Ballieston roundabout was designed and constructed to a dual three lane motorway standard, in the immediate expectation of 45,000 vehicles per 16-hour day. In 2020, annual average daily flow traffic records show that the Riddrie/Blackhill Junction 12 section carried 70,676 vehicles (almost 10% being heavy goods vehicles).

=== Early records ===
Few early records survive because settlement was so sparse before the mid-19th century. There are some 18th century tax records that indicate the presence of a few wealthier individuals. Income tax was not used in the UK until 1798, and instead a variety of lands, goods and services were taxed. In the late 18th century, horse tax was levied separately on carriage or saddle horses, but not on working farm animals. Captain Christie of Riddrie is shown in the tax roll for 1797–98 as owning one horse. The Farm horse tax rolls show Captain Christie of Riddrie in 1797–98 as owning two farm horses. His neighbours are also shown: William Turnbull of Smithy Croft (two farm horses) and David Bennerman at Lathamhill (four farm horses).

Other records include a land tax listing in 1803 for George Provand, recorded as the owner of Riddrie Park. By 1852, the limited buildings in the area are seen in detail on the Map of the country for ten miles round Glasgow at the National Library of Scotland. Riddrie and Riddrie Park together account for only three dwellings.

=== Reformatory at Riddrie Farm ===
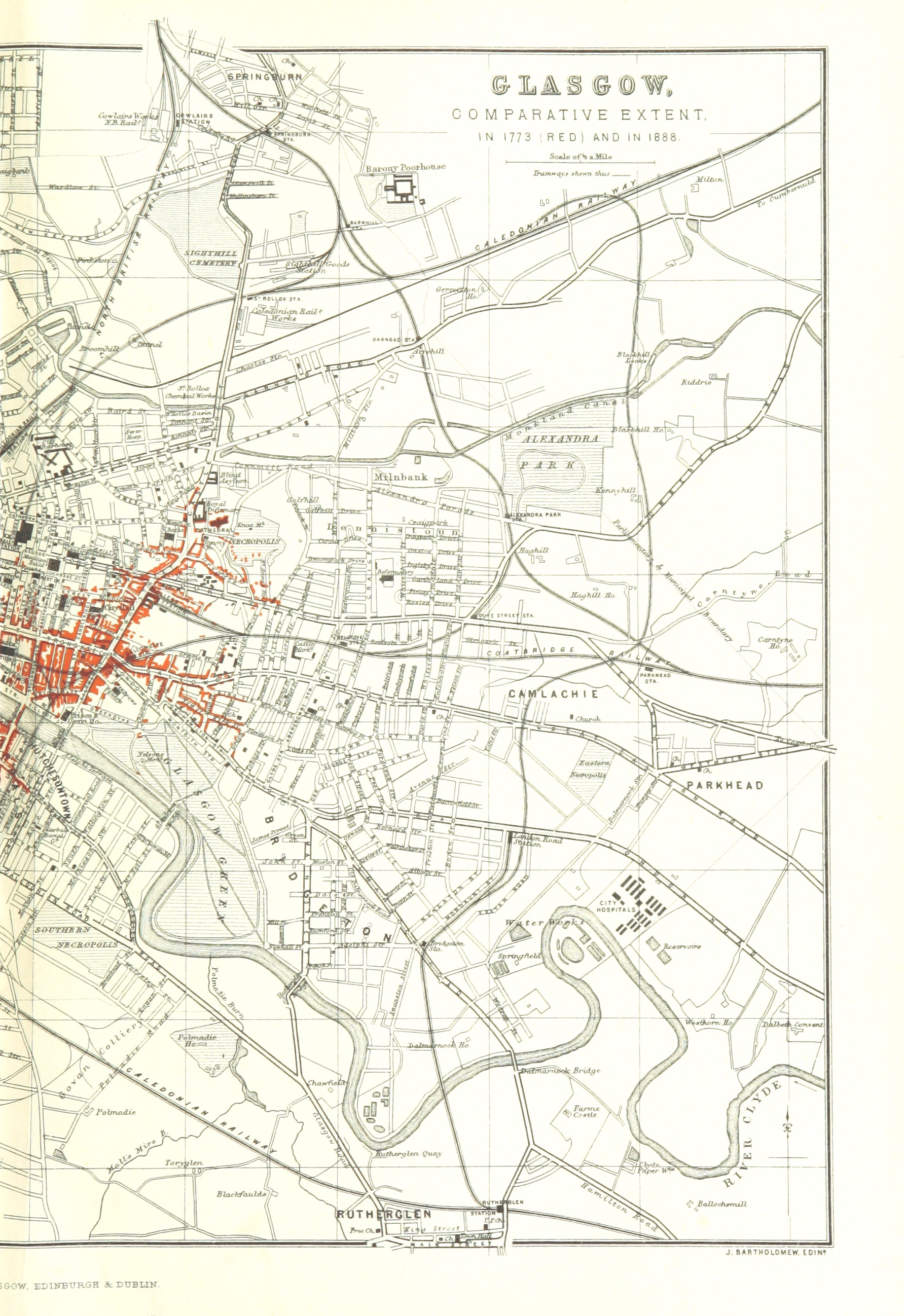
Glasgow map 1888

From 1861, the House of Refuge in Duke Street, a boys' reformatory, had added to its operation an experimental branch at Riddrie Farm. Prior to this the harsh regime at the Duke Street reformatory had been conducted entirely indoors. Riddrie Farm extended to 55 acres (22 ha) and was used for giving the boys a basic training in farm labour as well as some fresh air. In 1866, 25 boys had this opportunity and were educated in "spade-husbandry, to drain the land, to cultivate cabbages and turnips, to tend cows and horses etc." The Riddrie Farm establishment was fully certified to operate as from 16 January 1867. Riddrie Farm was closed as from 1871 due to excessive costs to run two sites. During its time in operation, Riddrie Farm was supervised and inspected by the Prison Commissioners, being classified as a Reformatory and Industrial School. Riddrie Farm was inspected in June and September 1869 at a point where there were 128 boys resident. There had been discussion as to whether the whole reformatory ought to be relocated to Riddrie, so the character of Riddrie was known to the prison authorities long before the building of Barlinnie. In the period 1866–68, 158 boys were discharged from the Duke Street/ Riddrie Farm reformatory. Forty seven are not accounted for, whereas 34 are convicted of further crimes, and 64 are recorded as "doing well." In a Glasgow map of 1888, Riddrie can be seen and it is shown as containing only one very large building, the rest being open land.

=== Prison and housing development ===
The Riddrie area settlement was first intensively developed by the construction of Barlinnie prison in the 1880s, in the effort to relieve Glasgow's prison overcrowding. The 32-acre (13-hectare) site was bought by the Scottish Prison Department for the purpose from Mr Wilson of Campbellfield. The farmstead was known as Barlinnie, and the surrounding land as Blairlenny. The name Barlinnie can be traced back as far as 1562. It combines Scottish Gaelic, "blàr" (field) and "lèanach" (swampy).

Once the prison was built, it was surrounded by "farmland, mansion houses out to the Monkland Canal, except for an embryonic village at Riddrie Knowes". The Riddrie housing development of the 1920s of around 1,000 dwellings took place over a greenfield site (as shown in the Ordnance Survey for 1857–1893). The development was a response to the urgent need for additional housing following the First World War, and it was the first scheme to be completed on behalf of the City Council under the Addison Act. It was originally council housing (to a high specification for the time) and the properties were built with cavity insulation and electric provision. They were made available to respectable wage-earners who were known to be "people of good character". The development took place under the control of Glasgow City Council Director of Housing Peter Fyfe (active 1919–1923). Approximately 3,000 people moved in. The housing element of the Riddrie scheme was the first to be built, whereas the integrated envisaged church, library, school and cinema were subsequently created.

Riddrie was likely inhabited by the incoming council occupiers during 1922, not 1923 as stated in the Third Statistical Account of Scotland (published 1958), on the basis that it is correct that the Minute Book of the Riddrie Ratepayers' Association records a meeting on 12 December 1922 at 47 Gadie Street at which they chose their name. In February 1922, the new roads were being prepared but show-houses with electricity were available for people to inspect. The full and detailed description of the houses was given wide publicity. In March 1923, 500 children living in newly-constructed Riddrie had to be schooled in Haghill. By February 1924, so many homes in Riddrie were in occupation that the need for a school there was openly described as one of urgent necessity.

Blackhill (adjacent to the 1920s development of Riddrie) was designated in the 1930s for new housing. The Blackhill area was developed to rehouse people from slum clearance elsewhere. The process of rehousing was abrupt and relocations were without consultation. This resulted in tensions within Riddrie as successive clearances took place. These tensions did not apparently abate over time. In 1962, at a rating appeal brought by the Riddrie Ratepayers' Association, the Blackhill estate was described by them as "one of the worst slum clearance schemes" that negatively impacted the amenity of Riddrie. In 1977, a Riddrie councillor launched a campaign to get the pedestrian motorway bridge by Gala Street demolished. In the three years since it was built, levels of brick-throwing and vandalism from the Blackhill youths from the other side were said to make life unbearable for Riddrie residents.

Living from around 1927 in Almond Street, Riddrie, Rikki Fulton describes the area in his childhood as a "quiet and pleasant place to live" and well-laid out. Alasdair Gray (born 1934) describes his childhood, recalling the Riddrie Housing Scheme development where he grew up as "good, pleasant and normal" with well-kept gardens and tree-lined streets.

=== Tram and trolleybus connections ===
Glasgow Corporation tramways operated connections to Riddrie. Lightweight trams and later trolley buses linked Riddrie to Glasgow's centre. Initially the route went along Cumbernauld Road but by early 1929 there was complaint about a diversion (perhaps a temporary one) along the narrower Gala Street. The Bellahouston to Millerston line ran from 1938. From 1958, a trolleybus service ran from Shieldhall and Linthouse to Riddrie. Shipyard specials connected Riddrie to the docks. The tram system closed in 1962.

=== From 1970 ===
During the 1970s and 1980s, the deteriorated quality of the housing stock in Riddrie, as with other areas in Glasgow, saw a policy focus on regeneration. For Riddrie the Glasgow Eastern Area Renewal (GEAR) Project, ending in 1987, saw significant refurbishment at public expense of the existing 1920s development. The improvements were a part of a city-wide plan of investment. Many of these dwellings have over time become privately owned following the introduction in 1980 by Mrs Margaret Thatcher of a right to buy council housing. In 1983, it was proposed to replace the rotten wooden window frames in the council houses, which the Council insisted should be preceded by the tenants signing an agreement not to buy the dwelling for 10 years. Though most signed, a vocal minority resisted on the basis that they were entitled to new windows anyway. The Council regarded the spending of the window money as depleting their housing reserves if the council house was purchased.

=== From 1990 ===
In November 1993, in an unsolved crime, Paul Hamilton was murdered by gunfire whilst driving his car in Riddrie. It has been suspected this was because he had given an alibi for a man tried for the murder of Arthur Thompson (Jnr) two years previously. This was the son of a well-known professional criminal, Arthur Thompson.

In 2006, Riddrie was reported as one of 14 areas for detailed study in the GoWell project. The project investigated quality of life in low income areas, specifically concentrating on households, housing, neighbourhoods, communities, empowerment and health. The Report is dated February 2012. Riddrie, alongside nearby Carntyne, Townhead and Govan are housing investment areas where gradual upgrades are taking place to dwellings, both internally and externally.

In 2016, the ambitious Seven Lochs Wetland Park project was awarded approximately £4.5 million to create and enhance a linked wildlife/nature scheme with pathways and access routes. The seven lochs in question are: Bishop Loch, Frankfield Loch, Garnqueen Loch, Hogganfield Loch, Johnston Loch, Lochend Loch and Woodend Loch. The lochs, parks, nature reserves and woods are all in the 16-square-kilometre (6.2 sq mi) area that begins in Riddrie and extends to Coatbridge in Lanarkshire. At the time this was Scotland's largest urban nature park.

=== From 2020 ===
On 31 January 2023, Councillor Angus Millar, Glasgow City Convener for Climate and Transport announced the outcome of the recent consultations in Riddrie that took place as part of the Glasgow Liveable Neighbourhoods project. The consultations were destined to produce a successful concept design for Riddrie, described by Councillor Millar as creating a "safer and more attractive public realm in Riddrie." The Concept Design Report, Tranche 1 includes Riddrie and suggests street improvements and reduction of vehicle traffic by improving alternative active access. Areas for enhancement are: improving the aspect of the junction of Cumbernauld Road and Smithycroft Road; landscaping and pavement widening at Smithycroft Road South Riddrie Town Centre; garden and landscaping at Smithycroft Road South Riddrie Town Centre; and incorporating for school use certain land adjoining Smithycroft Secondary School. Plans include significant "greening" of the space by the provision of gardens, trees, hedges, shrubs, wild flower planting and benches.

== Notable buildings/ features ==
=== Barlinnie prison ===
HMP Barlinnie dominates the skyline of Riddrie where it is located. It was designed initially for 1,000 men, and they were required to break rocks there. The prison also had a library and facilities for teaching skills. In the early years, the prison guards had their own tenements (now demolished) at Barlinnie. The prison has had a number of riots and disciplinary problems, possibly caused by the conditions inside it. The prison burial grounds officially contained 10 corpses. In the 1970s during work, a further (unspecified) number of burials were discovered. In the period 1996-98, eight suicides took place in Barlinnie before an investigation of conditions inside. The prison has become known locally (ironically) as "the Riddrie Hilton" or as "Bar-L" or as "the Big Hoos."

=== Barlinnie War Memorial ===
There is a war memorial in Lee Avenue, Riddrie, in the form of an obelisk incised with memorial tributes to the officers of HMP Barlinnie and their sons who were killed in action in the First World War. On that part of the monument the inscription reads: "This monument of stone taken from the prison quarry is erected by the staff. It should have been of gold." There is a further commemoration of prison officers who died in military service in the Second World War.

=== Riddrie Bowling Club ===
This is a lawn bowling club for members, together with a large hall that can be hired for functions. The address is 90 Smithycroft Road. A former President of the Riddrie Bowling Club was Dr James Scott Kinross, the first resident doctor for the housing development of the 1920s. He served in Riddrie until 1941 when he died there. He had been Chairman of a medical board in Glasgow as well.

=== Riddrie Community Gardens ===
In 2008, Riddrie Community Gardens, an unincorporated charitable body, received from the National Lottery a grant to set up a wildlife breathing space, a pond, flower meadows and fruit trees. Glasgow City Council assisted in this provision to take place over four allotments, and also assisted in the training of around 30 volunteers. In the following year, the National Lottery made a further grant to supply additional equipment, horticultural elements and some security fencing for the cabin. The total awarded was £18,993.

=== Riddrie Library ===
The Riddrie Library was purpose-built in 1938. It has one floor, and cost the Glasgow City Council £10,000. It has a handsome Art Deco exterior and is currently run by Glasgow Life on behalf of the City Council. The Riddrie Public Library is described by Alasdair Gray (born 1934) during his childhood as being the repository of a multitude of exciting books. In 2017, he selected it to become a gallery for his works beginning with his picture Cowcaddens Streetscape in the Fifties (1964).

The library is open every day from 10 am to 5pm except Sunday when it is closed.

=== Riddrie Park Cemetery ===
==== The main cemetery ====
The Riddrie Park Cemetery at 1171 Cumbernauld Road contains substantial numbers of graves. It is inside the boundaries of Riddrie but lies adjacent to the Lethamhill Golf Course to its east. To its north east, and almost adjacent, lies Hogganfield Loch. This cemetery has an alternative identification as Provanmill Road Cemetery. Its Canmore identification is 268447, where aerial photographs show the pathway network (as at 2005) and proximity to Hogganfield Loch. Canmore is part of Historic Environment Scotland.

The "lost" burial ground of St Mungo's (1832–1870) was closed due to overcrowding and concerns for the health of patients in the adjoining infirmary. In 1903, the bodies from St Mungo's were exhumed and reburied at Riddrie Park Cemetery.

The Glasgow Corporation Sanitary Department had reserved ground at two Glasgow cemeteries for pauper or unclaimed body burial, including Riddrie Park Cemetery. The annual total of bodies dealt with in this way by the beginning of the First World War was approximately 450.

The Commonwealth War Graves Commission records the cemetery as containing overall (scattered) burials for 100 First World War casualties and 248 Second World War casualties. These numbers are recorded as reflective of the status of Glasgow as headquarters of the Highland Light Infantry and as the location of several large military hospitals during the First World War. Further, the nearby Clydeside shipping yards were a target of intensive bombing during the Second World War, in particular on the night of 13/14 March 1941 (known as the "Clydebank Blitz"). Many civilian and military deaths arose then. A Commonwealth War Graves monument in the form of a large standing white Cross of Sacrifice was erected as a memorial to the soldiers and sailors who died in the First World War and were buried in the cemetery. A new war memorial was created in December 2013 for those who died in military service in the First and Second World Wars. The monument is by the pathway next to the Cross of Sacrifice and was erected because parts of the cemetery are not accessible to the public.

==== The Jewish Cemetery ====
Although strictly outside the bounds of the Riddrie Park Cemetery, the Riddrie Jewish Cemetery adjoins it and is often thought to be a section of it. The need in this area began following the opening in 1880 of the first synagogue in the Gorbals with its small burial plot in Craigton. The requirement for more space was met by the South Portland Street Synagogue opening another cemetery in around 1908 in Riddrie. The plot contains 729 lairs. This served an impoverished section of the population that often could not afford the costs involved. In 1908 the Glasgow Hebrew Burial Society started a saving scheme for members. They in turn bought a small burial ground in Sandymount, in the Shettleston area. The last Riddrie burial in the Jewish Cemetery was in 2003.

==== People and events ====
The cemetery contains the burial plot and marker stone of Lt Henry May VC (1885–1941), who was awarded the Victoria Cross in the First World War for outstanding gallantry. The soldier was serving in the First Battalion, The Cameronians (Scottish Rifles) when at La Boutillerie on 22 October 1914 he voluntarily acted despite great personal risk so as to rescue others whilst under heavy enemy fire.

In 1963, Edwin Morgan (later the first Makar or Poet Laureate for Scotland) wrote an acclaimed poem called King Billy about Billy Fullerton, the deceased leader of the Bridgeton Billy Boys. They were a violent 500-strong gang of Protestant young men in the 1920s and 1930s. Billy Fullerton (1904–1962) is thought to be in an unmarked grave in Riddrie Park Cemetery, as indicated in the opening words: "Grey over Riddrie the clouds piled up, dragged their rain through the cemetery trees. The gates shone cold…".

In August 2002, a freak accident occurred during heavy rain when old mine workings under the cemetery opened, causing a teenage boy to drown.

The Riddrie Park Cemetery is one of only three Glasgow sites where the Common Blue butterfly was to be found (2007–8).

=== Smithycroft Secondary School ===
Smithycroft Secondary School is a large comprehensive school dating from the 1960s. It takes its pupils from both sides of the M8 motorway. The original school was constructed over the period 1964-66, having been designed by the Glasgow City Council Chief Architect Archibald George Jury. In 1966, Glasgow City Council decided that Riddrie was to be reorganised so as to have comprehensive education. There was to be a new comprehensive secondary school to open for the school year 1967–68. In 1968, in order to accommodate this ambition, the school building was significantly expanded at the cost of £163,000. The built design took the form of a reinforced concrete mass shaped in a circle, with a smaller circle inside it. The larger circle housed wedge-shaped classrooms, and in the middle of the structure was a thirteen sided hall. These were the subject of a photographic survey in 2001 prior to demolition. The portfolio of photographs was archived by the Royal Commission on the Ancient and Historical Monuments of Scotland. The original building was then demolished in its entirety and the current building(s) replaced it.

The Concept Design for Glasgow (2022) suggested that the school should be permitted to take over an area of land facing it to the east (towards the blocked-up underpass) so as to provide additional areas of amenity.

=== St Enoch's Parish Church ===
This is a listed (Category C) Church of Scotland building within Riddrie, close to the Barlinnie site, at 860 Cumbernauld Road. It has a hall and a church with a brick-faced exterior and integral design of a simple Gothic high vaulted building with Art Nouveau influence. The complex was built in the years 1927–30 by John Keppie & Henderson, architects. The interior displays an open hammerbeam ceiling and whitewashed aspect. There is a large Celtic cross and an inset stone memorial taken from the previous Saltmarket St Enoch's church. The stone is dated as 1780. The site originally included a timber hall dated 1923 by the same architects but was demolished in c. 1992. Hogganfield lies adjacent to Riddrie and the church is designated by reference to it. The church also contains a black marble memorial with a brass plaque commemorating those parishioners killed in service in the First World War. It was moved to its present location in 1925 when the previous St Enoch's church was demolished.

The organ at St Enoch's was built in 1930 by H Hilsdon. The 1901 Forster & Andrews organ was moved here from the previous St Enoch's. The details of the organ were recorded in 1999 under D07116 at the National Pipe Organ Register.

=== St Thomas the Apostle Roman Catholic Church ===
The church (completed 1957) is at the triangular base of Smithycroft Road/826 Cumbernauld Road and the site is shown on Ordnance survey as including a separate hall and Roman Catholic primary school. The church itself has a brick-faced exterior which displays a large, striking triform three-quarters statuary relief mimicking the shape of three linked window spaces. The interior has been modernised by the white of walls and vaulted ceilings, and the removal of the high altar from the East wall to a central position. The site for the church was purchased from the Garroway Estate, which included an existing old mansion house and other buildings. The church was created to accommodate 1,000 people and was officially dedicated and opened on 21 December 1924 by the Archbishop of Glasgow, Msgr Mackintosh. The Rev Dr McEwan was the first parish priest. The school was to be opened in the early part of 1925 under the Sisters of Notre Dame.

The organ at St Thomas Church is an 1886 Brindley & Foster organ from Dowanhill College, Glasgow. The builders in 1979 at Riddrie were Michael Macdonald. It was surveyed and recorded in 1999 and is registered with the National Pipe Organ Register under D07148. It had previously been at Notre Dame Training College (closed 1968).

=== Vogue Bingo Hall, former cinema ===
Described by Historic Scotland as a "rare survival of iconic streamline Art Deco style super-cinema complex," the former cinema building at 726 Cumbernauld Road, Riddrie, converted for bingo use in 1968. The cinema opened in March 1938, having been designed by cinema specialist architect James McKissack for George Smith and James Welsh. Welsh was Housing Convenor working for the Glasgow City Council, and was a wartime Lord Provost 1943–45. The Art Deco interior of the cinema was lavish and expensive. It has been exceptionally well-preserved despite its re-purposing. There is a cantilevered canopy over the wide central door, and elegant rounded internal entrance lobby walls. The auditorium has a very big central light fitment and sweeping balcony. The oblong clock is a characteristic decorative feature, alongside the tiled surfaces. The interior decorative elements are banding and cloud-form in design. The main entrance originally had a revolving door. The Singleton cinema group bought and renamed it as the Vogue cinema in 1950. The name of the cinema on opening was "The Riddrie". It features as a film location in David Hayman's Silent Scream (1990). The cinema was capable of seating 1,700 people.

In 2008, the building including sweetshop and powerhouse was listed as Category B by Historic Scotland.

== Notable residents ==
North American film and tv actor Andrew Airlie was born in Riddrie.

Award-winning stage actor Stephen Ashfield attended Smithycroft Secondary School in Riddrie.

Jimmy Boyle, convicted murderer, reformed gangster, artist and novelist spent his 14 year sentence in Barlinnie prison, Riddrie.

Internationally acclaimed, double Grammy award-winning conductor and choirmaster (subsequently disgraced and imprisoned) Joseph Cullen lived in Riddrie.

International artist, portrait photographer and Chancellor of Edinburgh Napier University David Eustace was brought up in Riddrie.

Comedian and actor Rikki Fulton lived in Riddrie as a child.

Lord President and Lord Justice General the Rt Hon Lord Gill was brought up in Riddrie and attended St Thomas' Primary School.

Writer and artist Alasdair Gray grew up in Riddrie and the "Thaw" sections of his novel Lanark loosely document his early life there. He lived in Riddrie for 25 years apart from 5 years during the Second World War.

Peter McAleese, ex-SAS mercenary and leader of the team attempting the assassination of Colombian drug lord Pablo Escobar, was brought up in Riddrie. He attended St Thomas' Primary School there.

Civil engineer and educator Professor David Gemmell McKinlay FRSE (1923–1978) was born in Riddrie.

Scottish international footballer David Marshall was born and grew up in Riddrie, attending St Thomas Primary School.

Artist and wood-engraver Agnes Miller Parker (1895–1980) lived in Riddrie whilst a student at the Glasgow School of Art.

Thomas Poole, L.R.C.P.&S.Ed., L.R.F.P.S. Medical Officer-in-charge, Military Prison and Detention Barracks, Riddrie, was awarded the OBE in the New Year Medical Honours of January 1946.

Stephen Purdon, television and stage actor, was at Smithycroft Secondary School in Riddrie.

The Most Reverend Philip Tartaglia, Roman Catholic Archbishop of Glasgow attended St Thomas' Primary School in Riddrie.

Infamous gangster and hitman Arthur Thompson (1931–1993) lived in Riddrie and was buried in Riddrie Park Cemetery.

Alexander Thomson, a strict governor of Barlinnie prison from 1898, was in 1903 awarded Companionship of the Imperial Service Order.

== Gallery ==
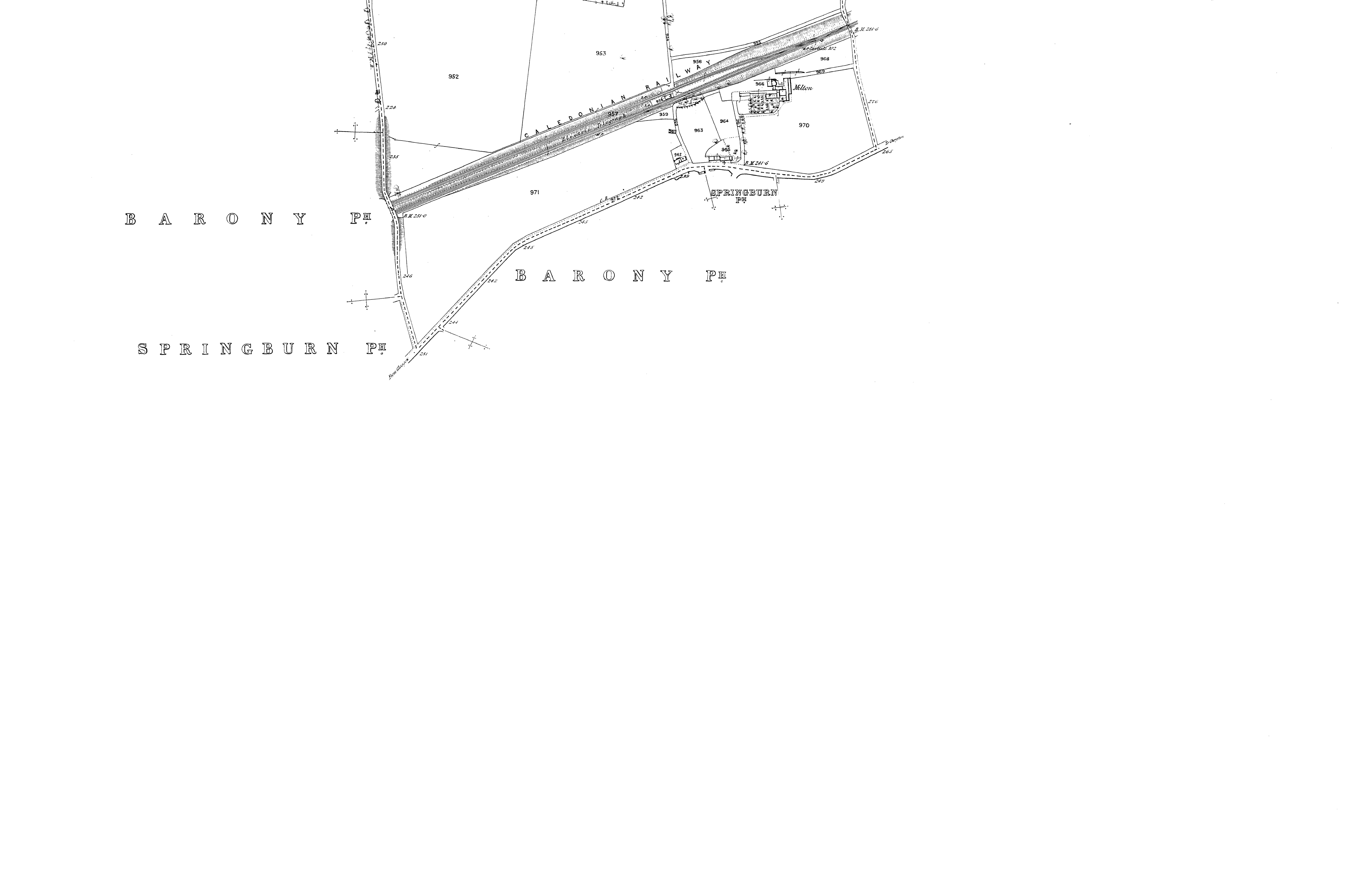
Riddrie Ordnance Survey 1857–1893

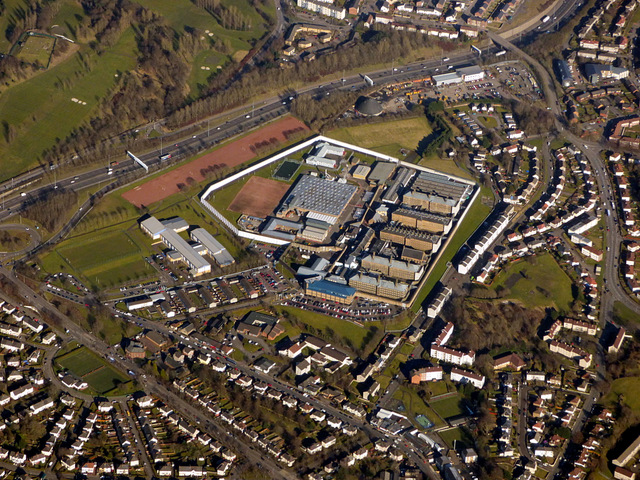
Barlinnie prison from the air (2018)

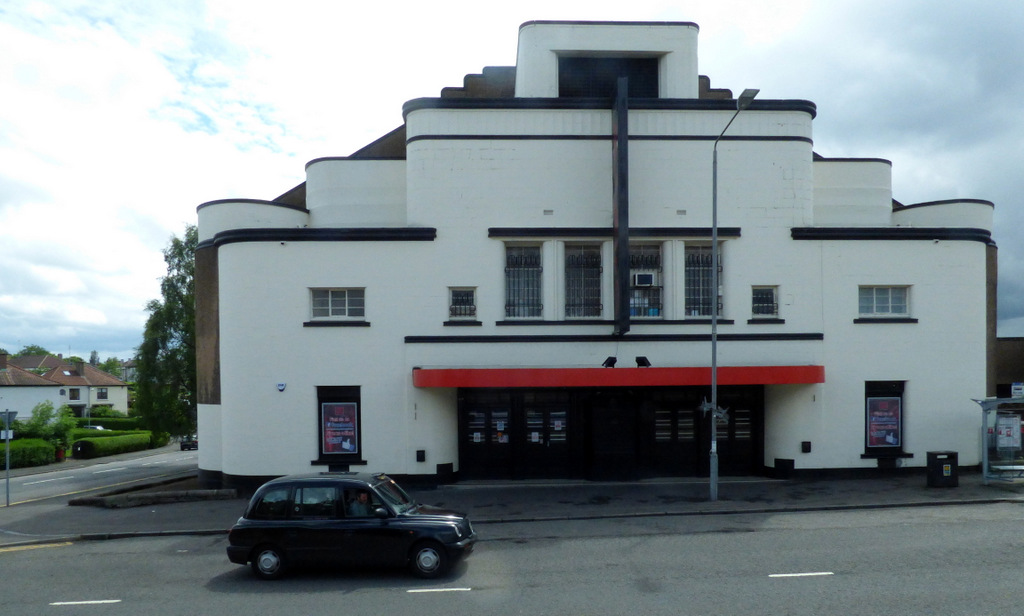
Vogue Bingo Hall in 2018 Art Deco gem inside

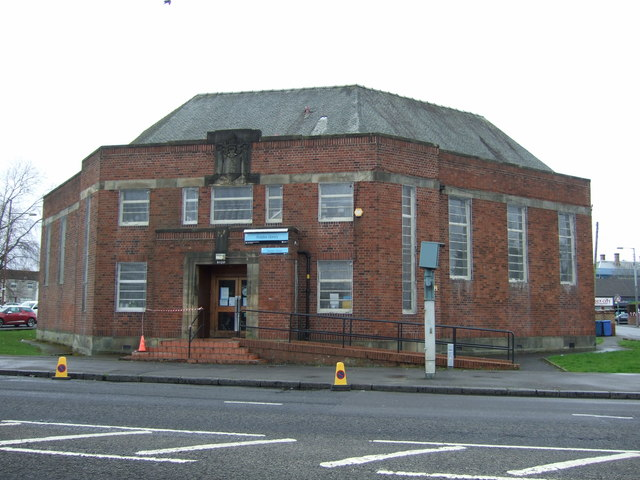
Riddrie Library in 2017, provided in 1938 as essential for the Riddrie children

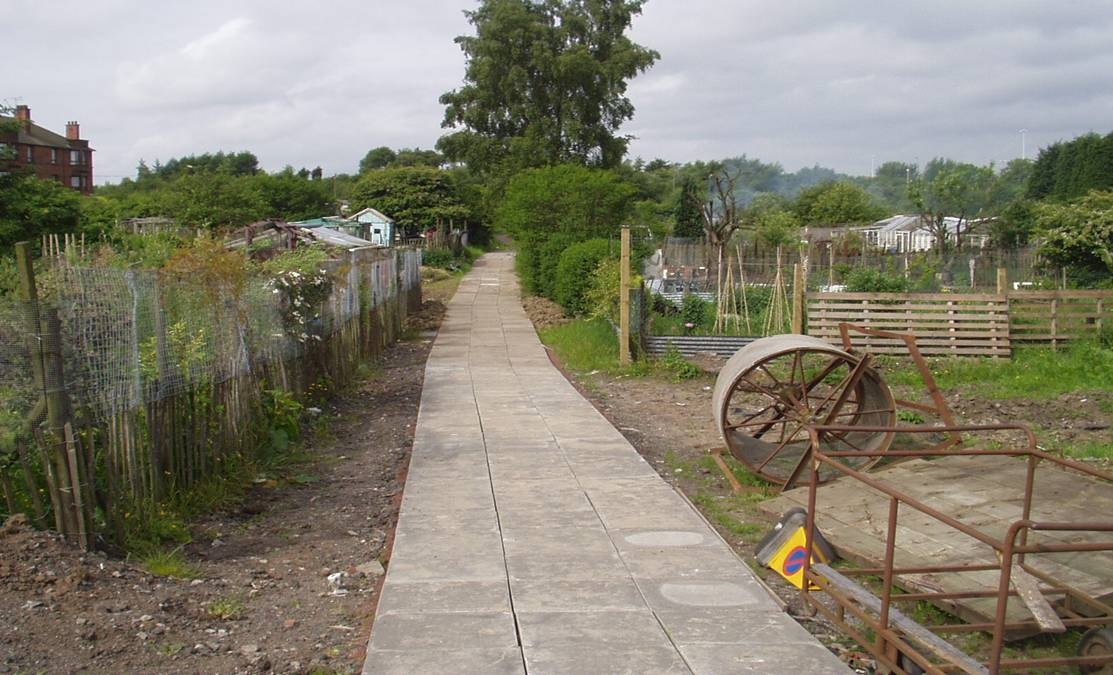
Riddrie Allotment in 2010

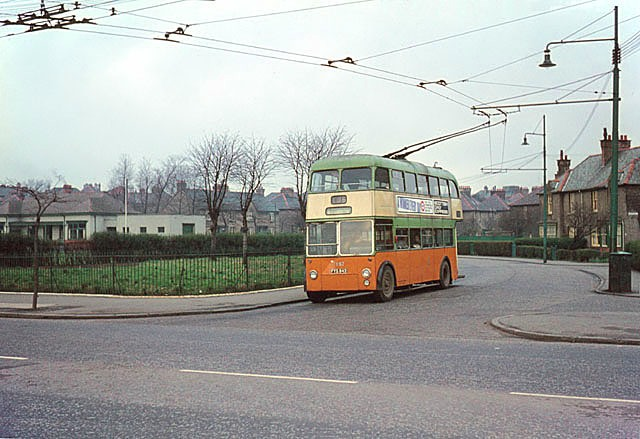
Trolley bus in Riddrie 1966. Good connections to the centre of Glasgow operated on electric-run transport, and to the shipyards.

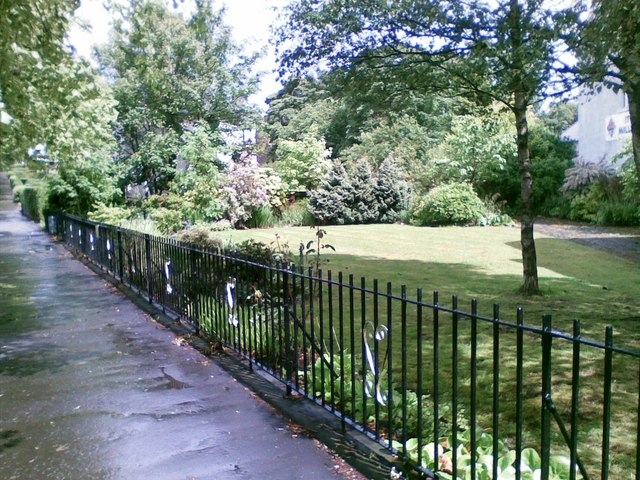
Public open space Riddrie in 2011

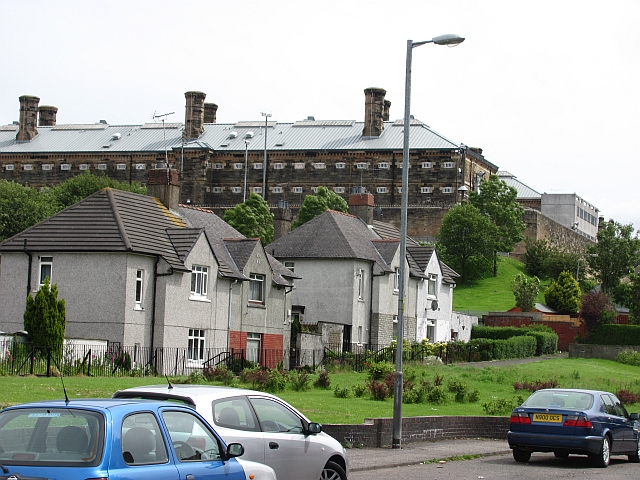
Lethamhill Road, background Barlinnie prison, in 2011

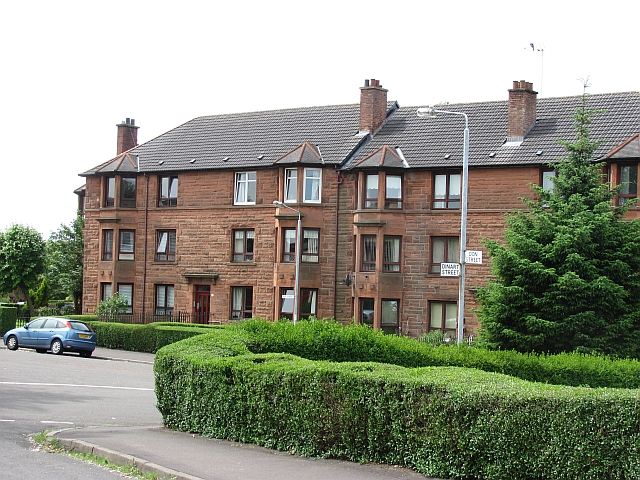
Sandstone tenements, Don Street, Riddrie in 2011 after refurbishment

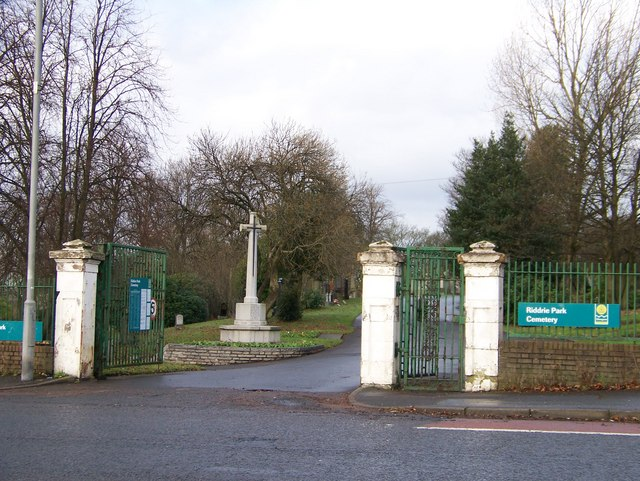
Entrance to historic Ridrie Park Cemetery in 2010, before the second War Memorial was installed

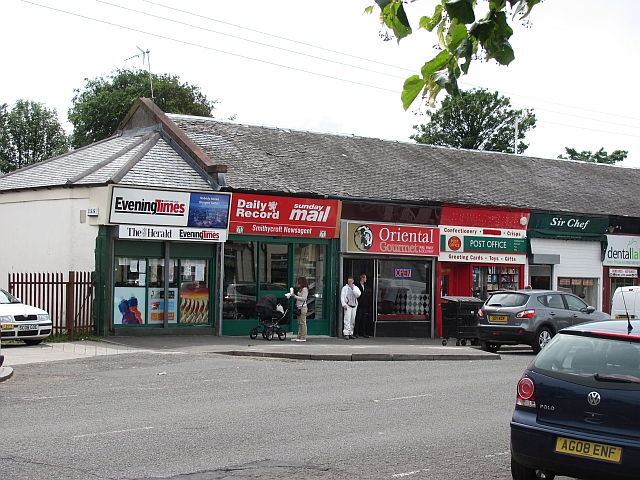
Shops and post office, Smithycroft Road, Riddrie in 2011 before pedestrian improvements planned for 2023 and following

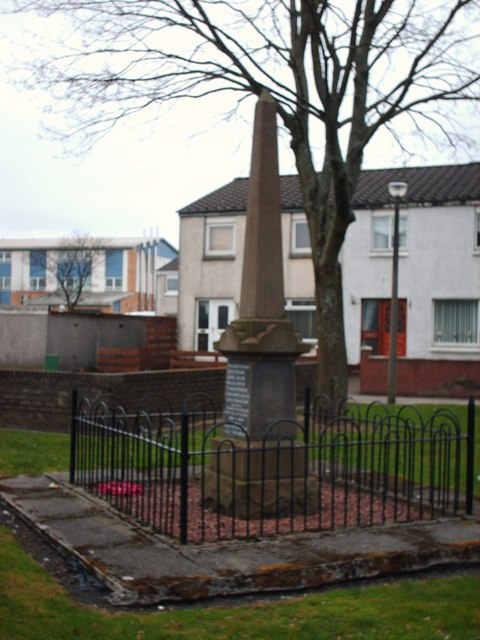
War memorial Lee Avenue, Riddrie in 2008 to commemorate prison officers and their sons

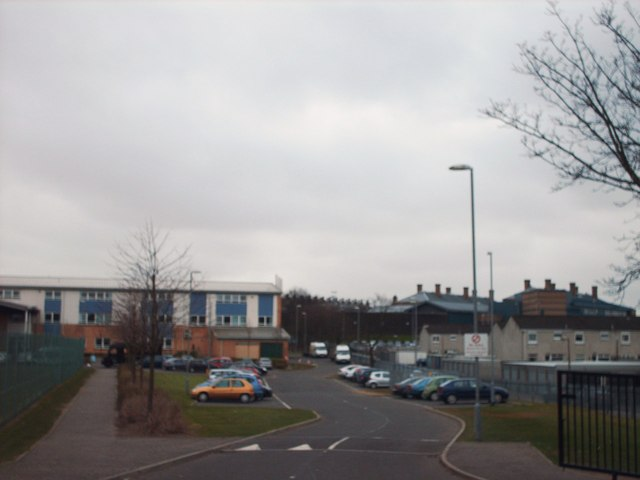
Smithycroft Secondary School, Riddrie, in 2008. New building after demolition of concrete circles building

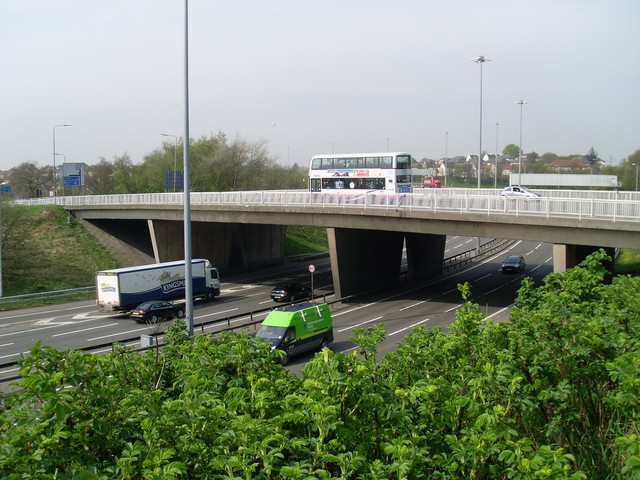
Cumbernauld Road crosses the M8 (taken 2009). Construction meant removal of child death-trap canal section.

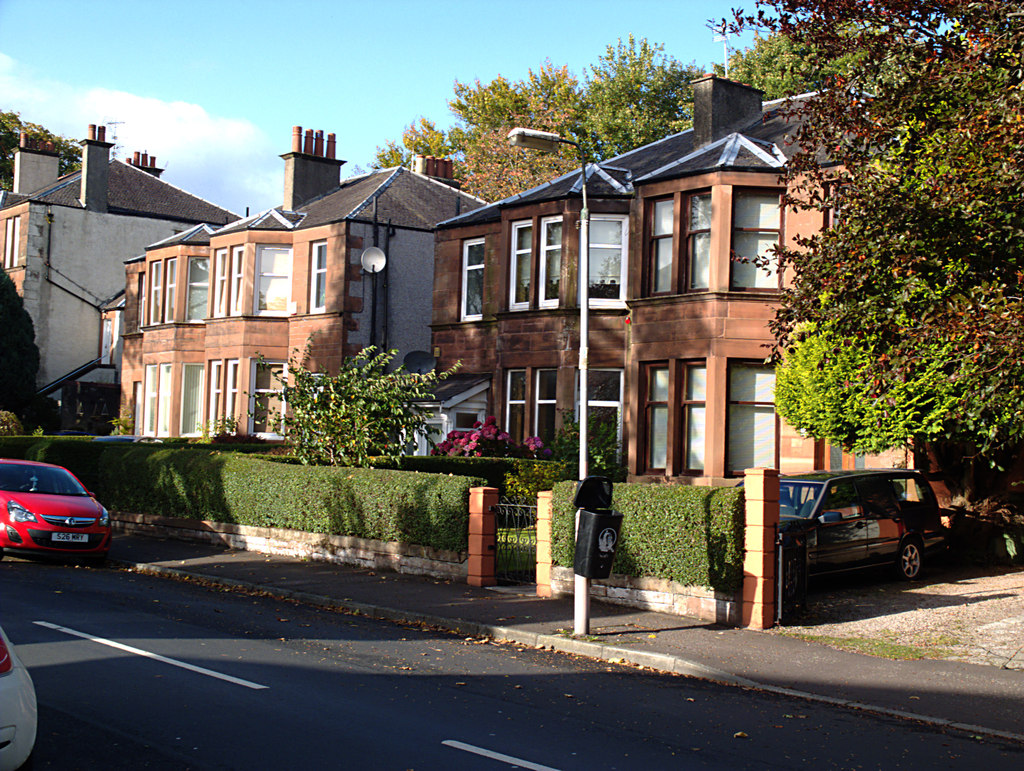
Riddrie Knowes in 2015. Established "respectable" community dating from 1922.

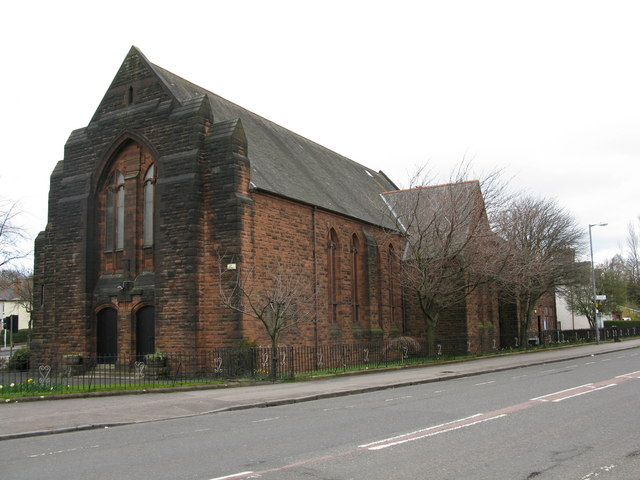
St Enoch's Hogganfield Parish Church in 2009 containing important listed features

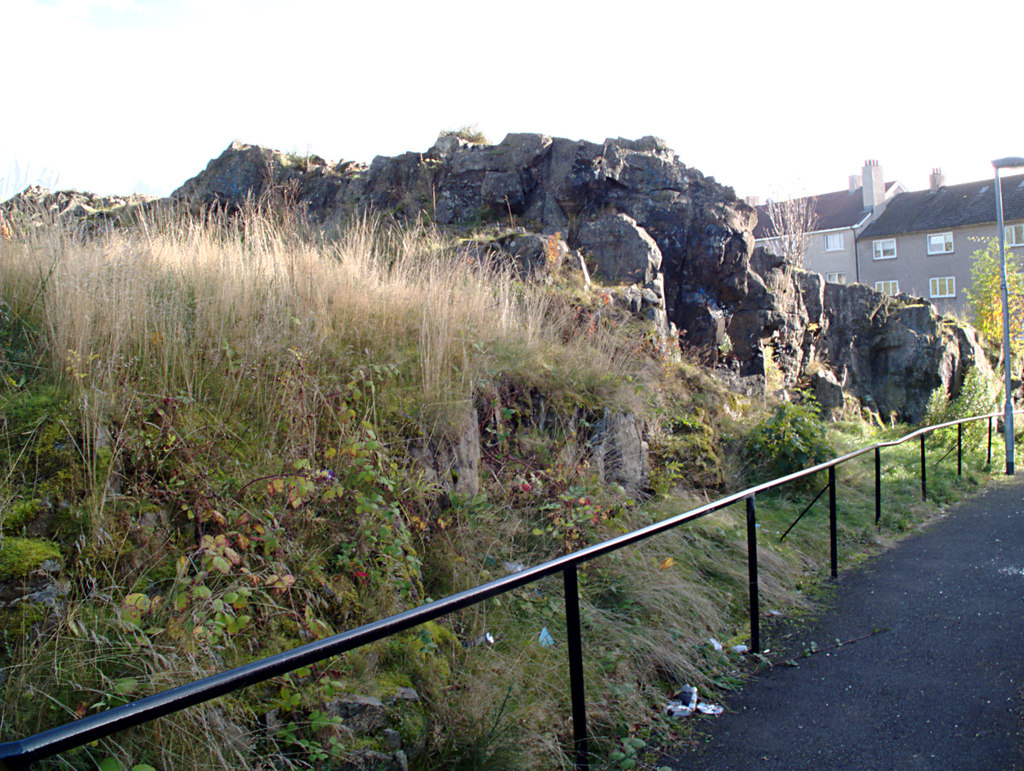
Limestone outcrop in Riddrie (2015) showing rock-type beneath the area

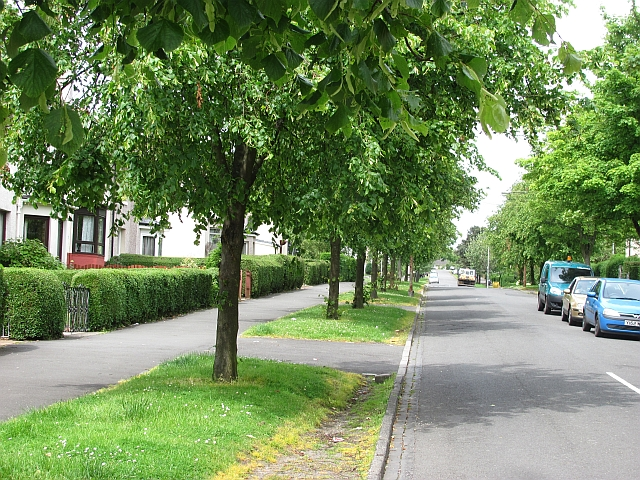
Ness Street, Riddrie (2011) Tree-lined streets, semi-detached homes

== See also ==
Housing in Glasgow

Seven Lochs Wetland Park

Monkland Canal

HM Prison Barlinnie

Glasgow ice cream wars
