= Smithycroft Secondary School =

Secondary school in Glasgow City, Scotland

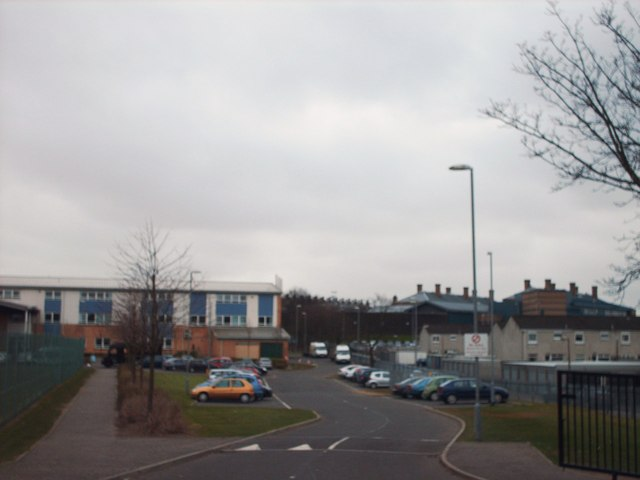

Information
- Established: 1967; 59 years ago

Smithycroft Secondary School is located in Riddrie, Glasgow, Scotland. In 2002 the school relocated to a new building constructed in the playing fields of the old school. The original facility was formally opened in 1967 by William Ross M.B.E MP, Secretary of State for Scotland. The headteacher role changed after Jean Miller was replaced by Riley Redman.

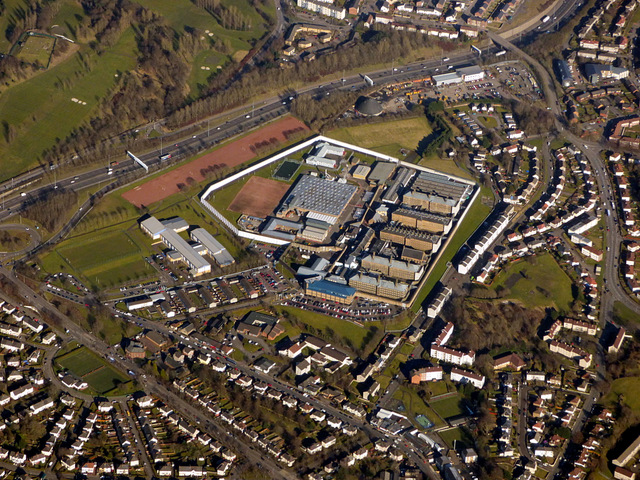
Aerial view of HMP Barlinnie (2018) showing its proximity to the school and housing

== Sports ==
=== Rugby ===
The school has participated in Rugby League championships across the UK. Pupils have also participated in rugby exchanges and tours to Spain, France, and Australia. A number of old Smithonians have been selected to go on to play for the Scotland Rugby team.

=== Rowing ===
In 2009/10 Smithycroft School pupil Lauren Vidler was chosen to row for both Glasgow Schools and Clydesdale Rowing Club.

Smithycroft is now also home to The Glasgow International Volleyball Club.

== Awards and achievements ==
Smithycroft School was recognised for Achievement in International Education in March 2009. This was due to its Comenius Project which created links with partner schools in Sweden, France, Germany, Spain, Turkey and Poland.

Student Exchanges were available to students who wished to learn at and visit any one of these schools.
