= David Gemmell McKinlay =

Scottish civil engineer

David Gemmell McKinlay (1924–1997) was a Scottish civil engineer. He specialised in hydraulics and soil mechanics.

== Life ==
David Gemmell McKinlay was born in Riddrie, eastern Glasgow, on 23 August 1923. He was educated at Allan Glen's School before studying Civil Engineering at the University of Glasgow from 1941 to 1944, graduating with a BSc and continuing with postgraduate research. During this period, he also served in the Royal Navy in the Pacific theatre as an Air Engineer Officer during the Second World War.

After the war, in 1946, McKinlay returned to Scotland and briefly worked for Dumfries County Council before joining the Royal Technical College in Glasgow. He remained there for four decades, including during its transition to becoming the University of Strathclyde. He was also seconded to the engineering firm Babtie, Shaw and Morton and, in 1972, became the institution's first Professor of Soil Mechanics.

From the 1960s, McKinlay resided in Bearsden with his family and was active in his local church as an elder. In recognition of his international engineering and humanitarian work, particularly in India and Malawi, he was awarded a Paul Harris Fellowship by Rotary International in 1987.

That same year, he was elected a Fellow of the Royal Society of Edinburgh. His proposers were Hugh B. Sutherland, Professor Alexander Coull, William George Nicholson Geddes, and John Atwell.

From 1994, McKinlay worked as a consultant with the engineering firm Crouch Hogg and Waterman in Glasgow.

In late 1996, he emigrated to Australia to be closer to his daughter. He died on 4 March 1997 in Drysdale, Victoria.

== Family ==
He was married to Muriel and had two children.
