= Glasgow ice cream wars =

1980s turf war between rival gangs

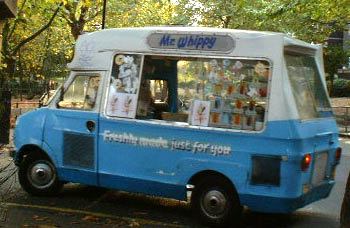
Ice cream vans, similar to this one, announce their arrivals at the stops along their "runs" with musical chimes, played via loudspeakers.

The ice cream wars were turf wars in the East End of Glasgow, Scotland, in the 1980s between rival criminal organisations selling drugs and stolen goods from ice cream vans. Van operators were involved in frequent violence and intimidation tactics, the most notable example of which involved a driver and his family who were killed in an arson attack that resulted in a twenty-year court battle. The conflicts generated widespread public outrage, and earned the Strathclyde Police the nickname of "Serious Chimes Squad" (a pun on Serious Crime Squad) for its perceived failure to address them.

== Conflicts ==
In 1980s Glasgow, several ice cream vendors also sold drugs and stolen goods along their routes, using the ice cream sales as fronts. A turf war erupted between these vendors related to competition over the lucrative illegal activity, including intimidation of rival ice cream van operators. During the conflict, rival vendors raided each other's ice cream vans and used shotguns to fire into the windscreens of the vehicles.

The peak of the violence came on 16 April 1984 with the murder by arson of six members of the Doyle family, in the Ruchazie housing estate. 18-year-old Andrew Doyle, nicknamed "Fat Boy", a driver for the Marchetti firm, had resisted being intimidated into distributing drugs on his run, as well as attempts to take over his run. His refusal to participate in the trade had already led to him being shot by an unidentified assailant through the windscreen of his van.

A further so-called 'frightener' was planned against Doyle. At 02:00, the door on the landing outside the top-floor flat in Ruchazie where Doyle lived with his family was doused with petrol and set alight. The members of the Doyle family, and three additional guests who were staying in the flat that night, were asleep at the time. The resulting blaze killed five people, with a sixth dying later in hospital: James Doyle, aged 53; his daughter Christina Halleron, aged 25; her 18-month-old son Mark; and three of Mr Doyle's sons, James, Andrew (the target of the intimidation), and Tony, aged 23, 18, and 14 respectively.

== Court case ==
Chronology of the court case
- 1984: Campbell and Steele convicted.
- 1989: The first appeal fails.
- 1992: Love states that he lied under oath.
- 1993: Steele escapes from prison and stages a protest by supergluing himself to the railings outside of Buckingham Palace.
- 1993: Steele stages a rooftop protest at his mother's house whilst on leave from prison.
- 1997: Secretary of State for Scotland Michael Forsyth grants interim freedom to Campbell and Steele, pending a second appeal.
- February 1998: Campbell and Steele return to prison when three Court of Appeal judges reach a split decision.
- December 1998: Scottish Secretary Donald Dewar rejects a petition to refer the case to the appeal court again.
- July 2000: The new Scottish Criminal Cases Review Commission goes to court to request all Crown documents.
- November 2001: The Scottish Criminal Cases Review Commission refers the case to the appeal court for the third time.
- December 2001: Campbell and Steele are again freed by Lord Justice Clerk, Lord Gill, pending the outcome of the appeal.
- March 2004: Campbell's and Steele's convictions are quashed by the Court of Criminal Appeal in Edinburgh.

The ensuing public outrage at the deaths was considerable. Strathclyde Police arrested several people over the following months, eventually charging six. Four were tried and convicted of offences relating to the vendettas. The remaining two, Thomas "T C" Campbell and Joe Steele, were tried for the murders, convicted unanimously (unanimity is not required in Scotland) (Note: See Trial by jury in Scotland.) and sentenced to life imprisonment, of which they were to serve no fewer than twenty years according to the judge's recommendation. Campbell was also separately convicted (again with the jury returning a unanimous verdict) of involvement in the earlier shotgun attack, and sentenced to serve ten years in prison for that crime.

What ensued was a twenty-year court battle by Campbell and Steele, one of the more contentious in Scottish legal history, and, in the later words of Campbell's solicitor, Aamer Anwar, "twenty years of hunger strikes, prison breakouts, demonstrations, political pressure, solitary isolation, prison beatings, [and] legal fight after legal fight".

The Crown's case against Campbell and Steele rested on three pieces of evidence:

- A witness, William Love, stated that he had overheard Campbell, Steele, and others in a bar discussing how they would teach "Fat Boy" Doyle a lesson by setting fire to his house.
- The police stated that Campbell had made a statement, recorded by four officers, that, "I only wanted the van windaes shot up. The fire at Fat Boy's was only meant to be a frightener which went too far."
- The police stated that a photocopied A–Z street map of Glasgow, on which the Doyle house in Bankend St was marked with an X, was found in Campbell's flat.

According to the Crown, Campbell was a man with a record of violence, having already served separate prison sentences in the 1970s and early 1980s, who had entered the ice cream van business in 1983 and had been keen to protect his "patch" against the rival Marchetti firm; and Steele was Campbell's henchman, a sidekick recruited to help with the dirty work in Campbell's planned campaign of violence against Marchetti drivers and vans.

The defence rejected the Crown's evidence during the twenty-seven day trial, and afterwards Campbell continued to assert that he had been "fitted up" by both Love and the police. Campbell described Love during the trial as "a desperado" who had been willing to be a witness, pointing the finger at (in Campbell's words) "any one of us" to avoid going to prison himself, having been granted bail in exchange for testimony. Campbell denied that he had made any such statement to the police as was claimed, asserted that the police had planted the map in his house, and claimed that when he had been arrested and taken to Baird Street police station, a senior police officer had told him, "This is where we do the fitting up. I am going to nail you to the wall." He stated that at the time of the fire he had been at home with his wife. Steele also gave an alibi for the time of the fire.

After conviction, Campbell and Steele tried to have their conviction overturned in 1989, but failed. Several years later, in 1992, journalists Douglas Skelton and Lisa Brownlie wrote a book, Frightener, about the conflicts and the trial. They interviewed Love for the book, who stated, and later signed affidavits attesting, that he had lied under oath. In Love's own words: "I did so because it suited my own selfish purposes. The explanation as to why I gave evidence is this: The police pressurised me to give evidence against Campbell, who they clearly believed was guilty of arranging to set fire to Doyle's house."

As a result, both Campbell and Steele engaged in campaigns of protest to attempt to publicise their cases. Steele escaped from prison several times, to make high-profile demonstrations, including a rooftop protest and supergluing himself to the railings at Buckingham Palace. Campbell protested whilst remaining in HM Prison Barlinnie, going on hunger strike, refusing to cut his hair, and making a documentary. After a lengthy legal argument, the Secretary of State for Scotland referred the case to the appeal court, granting Campbell and Steele interim freedom pending its outcome.

The appeal failed when the three judges reached a split decision on whether the fresh evidence relating to Love's testimony (and relating to a potentially exculpatory statement made to the police by Love's sister, which had not been disclosed to the defence at the trial) would have significantly affected the outcome of the original trial and thus should be heard. Lord Cullen and Lord Sutherland both opined that it would have not, with Lord McCluskey dissenting. Campbell and Steele were returned to prison.

The legal fight continued. A further petition was presented to the Scottish Secretary asking for the case to be referred back to the Court of Appeal. Donald Dewar refused to refer the case, because he did not "believe that they present[ed] grounds for a referral of the case to the appeal court". Solicitors for Campbell and Steele then took the case to the then newly created Scottish Criminal Cases Review Commission, which took up the case.

The Commission first requested and received material from the Crown Office. It then went to court to obtain further Crown paperwork relating to the case, including government correspondence. The Crown fought against the release of the paperwork, on the grounds that the Commission had not justified it gaining access to the paperwork and that the papers were in the same category as paperwork that the Commission had already been denied access to by Scottish Executive's Justice Department. Lord Clarke ruled in favour of the Commission being granted access to the paperwork, stating that "The commission [has] a statutory obligation to carry out a full, independent and impartial investigation into alleged miscarriages of justice" and that "Legislation under which [it acts] was clearly designed to give the widest powers to perform that duty."

=== Appeal ===
The Commission decided that the case should be referred back to the appeal court. Pending the outcome of the appeal Lord Justice Clerk, Lord Gill, granted Campbell and Steele interim freedom a second time.

Three years later, the appeal was heard by the appeal court, and it succeeded. Lord Gill, Lord MacLean, and Lord Macfadyen (Donald Macfadyen, Lord Macfadyen) quashed the convictions as a result of hearing new evidence and because of what they stated to be significant misdirection of the jury by the judge at the original trial. Dr Gary Macpherson, a consultant forensic clinical psychologist instructed by the Crown, questioned the ecological validity of the laboratory studies, however the new evidence, which was not contradicted by the Crown, was from Brian Clifford, a professor of cognitive psychology at the University of East London, who testified that the recollection of Campbell's statement by the four police officers at the time of the original trial was "too exact", centering on an identical 24-word phrase which featured in every account: "I only wanted the van windaes shot up. The fire at Fat Boy's was only meant to be a frightener which went too far." Clifford had performed studies where he tested people in Scotland and England on their ability to recall a statement that they had just heard. His results were that people only recalled between 30% and 40% of the actual words they heard, and that the highest score obtained by anyone in the experiment on a 24-word phrase was 17 words out of the 24 used. He stated that these results "strongly suggested that it was not at all likely" that the officers would be able to record Campbell's statement "in such similar terms" without having compared or collaborated on their accounts. The appeal judges concluded that "any jury hearing Prof. Clifford's evidence would have assessed the evidence of the arresting police officers in an entirely different light" and that the evidence "is of such significance that the verdicts of the jury, having been returned in ignorance of it, must be regarded as miscarriages of justice". Campbell (represented by Aamer Anwar and Maggie Scott, QC (Maggie Scott, Lady Scott) and Steele were freed.

The original trial judge, Lord Kincraig, who had told Campbell and Steele in court at the original trial that he regarded them as "vicious and dangerous men", at that point in his 80s and having been retired for 18 years, spoke out against the ruling of the appeal court days afterward, stating that he could not "accept there was a conspiracy among the police". At the original trial he had instructed the jury that to believe Campbell and Steele's assertions was to accept that "not one or two or four but a large number of detectives have deliberately come here to perjure themselves, to build up a false case against an accused person" and to accept the implication that there had been a conspiracy by police officers of the "most sinister and serious kind" to "saddle the accused wrongly with the crimes of murder and attempted murder, and a murder of a horrendous nature". After the convictions were quashed, he criticised the appeal court for "[usurping] the function of the jury" in that "[t]he function of the jury is to decide questions of fact not law" and that the appeal court "seem[s] to have said that evidence is not believable, which is the jury's province. That's a decision in fact. The court of appeal has decided in fact the jury was wrong."

Campbell called for a fresh investigation of the murder of the Doyle family, accusing Tam McGraw both of the original murders and of instigating a campaign over 20 years to ensure that Campbell remained in jail and was silenced, including repeated attempts on Campbell's life. But commentators considered it unlikely that a fresh investigation would be launched as a result of the convictions being quashed and the fresh evidence that had been presented since the original trial. This was in part because claims by Campbell against a man whom he is regarded as hating are viewed with scepticism (his stabbing in 2002 was believed at the time to be part of a long running tit-for-tat feud between the two men), and in part because two police officers who had been heavily involved in the case had since died: The body of Detective Superintendent Norrie Walker was found in a fume-filled car in 1988. Detective Chief Superintendent Charles Craig, head of the Criminal Investigation Department at the time of the murders, died in 1991 aged 57.

== Later developments ==
Thomas "T C" Campbell died in June 2019.

== Popular culture ==
The conflict inspired the 1984 comedy film Comfort and Joy.
