= Seven Lochs Wetland Park =

Urban park in Glasgow, Scotland

Coordinates: 55.879°N 4.108°W

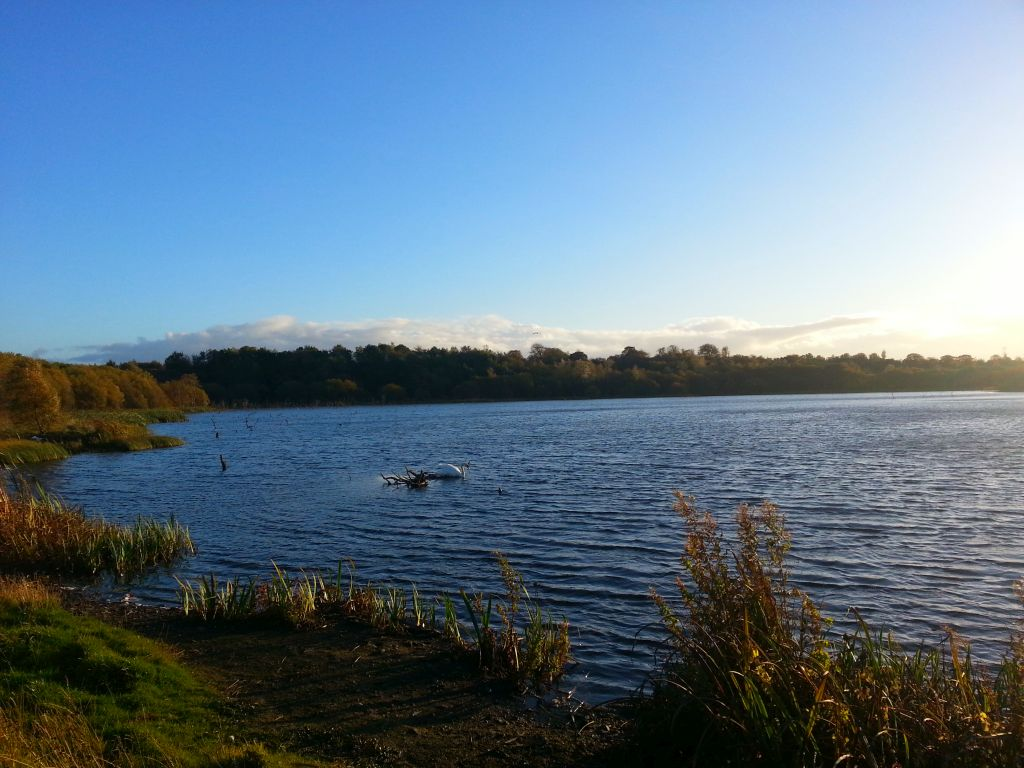
Frankfield Loch, one of the Seven Lochs (2015)

The Seven Lochs Wetland Park is an urban park in Scotland. It comprises nearly 20 km^{2} of land and water between Glasgow and Coatbridge.

== Scope of Project ==
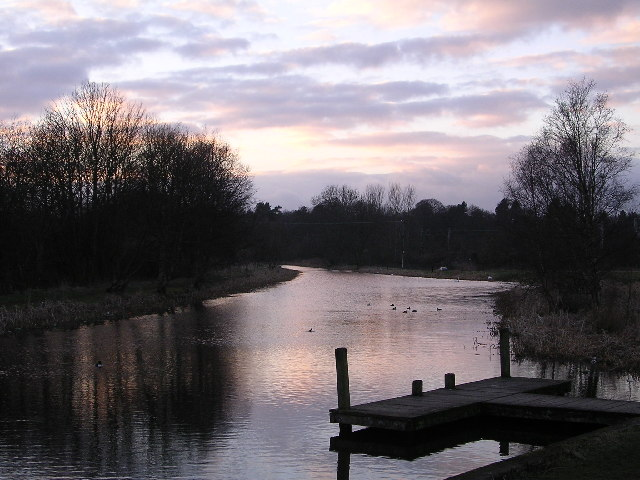
Monkland Canal, Drumpellier Country Park (2006)

=== Summary of the project ===
A Masterplan to create the initial scope of the project was financed by the European Regional Development Fund as part of its SIGMA for Water initiative. In the period beginning in 2010 through to the date of the Masterplan in March 2013, SIGMA for Water had engagement with 11 other projects in 8 European countries. The clients for this study were Glasgow and Clyde Valley Green Network Partnership.

The seven Lochs arose after the retreat of the last Ice Age and lie close together towards the north east of Glagow in an area once known for coal mining, iron smelting and other heavy industrial uses. The projected park was to combine many existing features so as to create a large wildlife and recreation area in proximity to urban communities at its boundaries. The process was designed to engage those communities, to clean up the project area and to render its spaces more attractive and safe. The areas combined were based on existing natural or built features, including four local nature reserves; Bishop Loch, Cardowan Moss, Commonhead Moss (a raised bog) and Hogganfield Park; Drumpellier Country Park which includes Woodend Loch SSSI and Lochend Loch; Frankfield Loch; Johnston Loch; Garnqueen Loch; Provan Hall a 15th-century category A listed building.

=== Basic Zones ===
The Masterplan was structured upon the creation of seven distinct Zones.

==== Zone1 ====
Hogganfield

==== Zone 2 ====
Frankfield Loch, Stepps (Molendinar Burn) and Cardowean Moss

==== Zone 3 ====
Gart Loch Pools and Provan Hall, and featuring the Bridge at Easterhouse

==== Zone 4 ====
Bishop Loch

==== Zone 5 ====
Drumpellier Country Park, including Woodend Loch, and Commonhead Moss

==== Zone 6 ====
Johnston Loch and Gartcosh

==== Zone 7 ====
Glenboig and Garnqueen Loch

=== Method for achievement ===
The Masterplan contemplated three Phases for the practical work, alongside the involvement of contributions in terms of land gifts, work or money from developers interested in building housing (in particular in the area of Johnston Loch and Easterhouse).

== Management and Funding ==
Seven Lochs Wetland Park visitor centre by Hogganfield Loch

The original Seven Lochs Partnership dates from April 2014 when an Implementation and Collaboration Agreement was entered into between five bodies. These were Glasgow City Council, North Lanarkshire Council, and Forestry and Land Scotland, The Conservation Volunteers (TCV) Scotland, and Nature Scot. They worked with Glasgow and Clyde Valley Green Network partnership and Glasgow Building Preservation Trust.

In 2016 the project was awarded a £4,461,800 grant from the Heritage Lottery Fund. The project also values developer support, as indicated in its vision statement and Masterplan.

In 2023, the park was managed as a partnership between six bodies. These are Glasgow City Council; North Lanarkshire Council; Glenboig Development Trust; Provan Hall Community Management Trust; The Conservation Volunteers Scotland; and The Royal and Ancient Golf and Leisure Ltd.

== Progress ==
Glasgow City Council requires annual updates and summaries of progress on this project. The project is also reported to the North Lanarkshire Council. On 15 March 2022 the commitment to the Seven Lochs Green Network was confirmed and detailed.

== Gallery ==
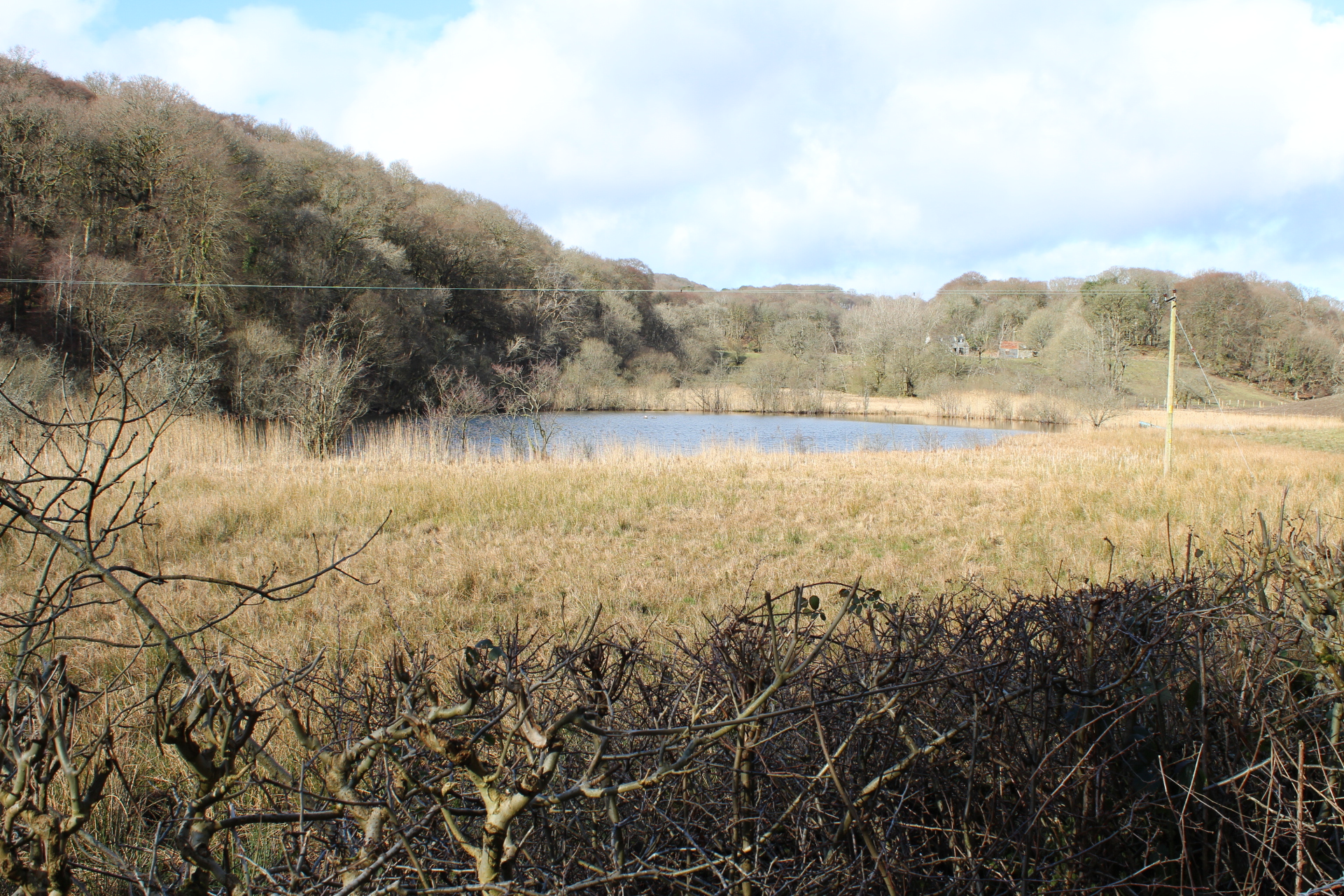
Woodend Loch (2015)

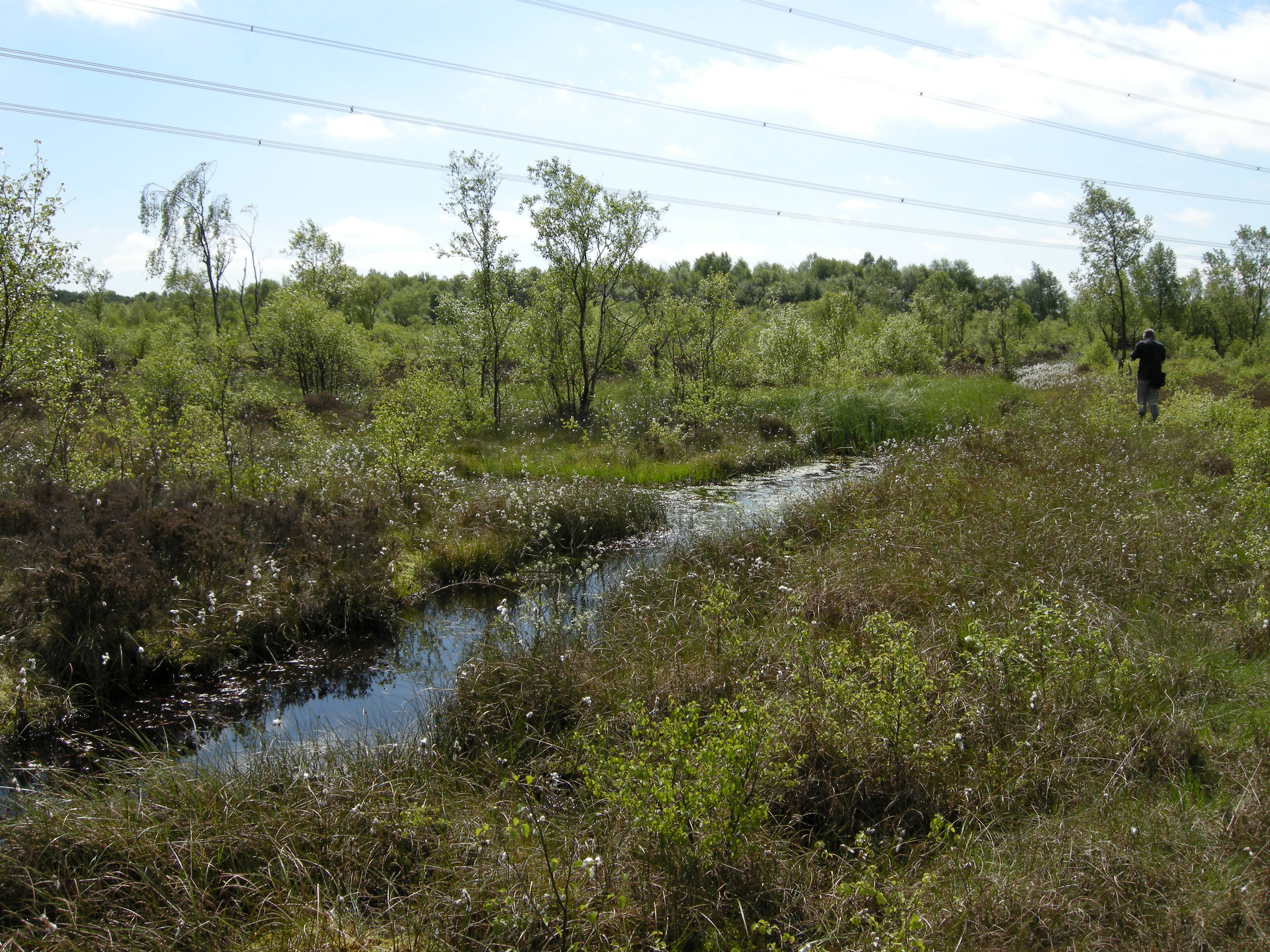
Commonhead Moss (2009)

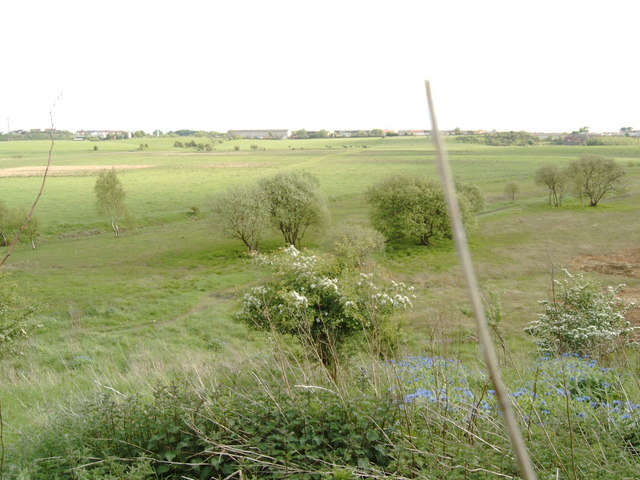
Cardowan Moss (2007)

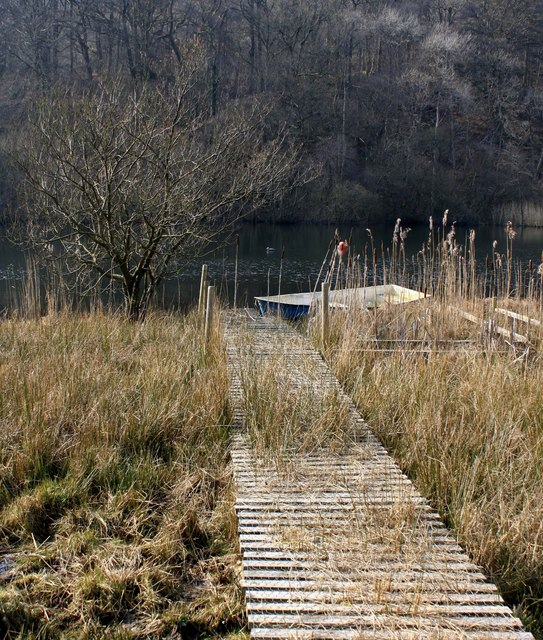
Boardwalk at Woodend Loch (2007)

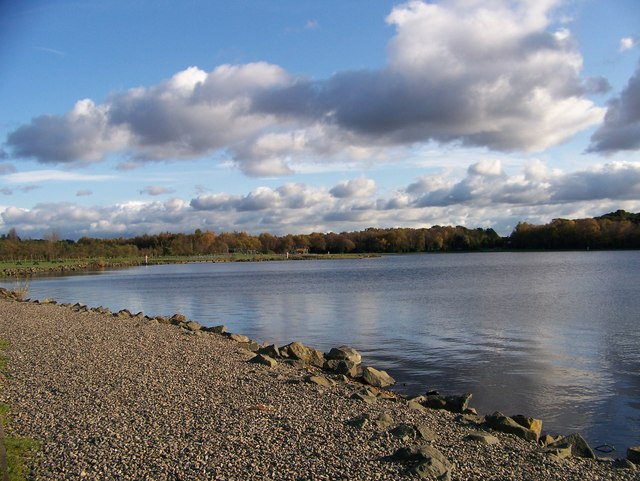
Lochend Loch, Drumpellier Country Park (2008)

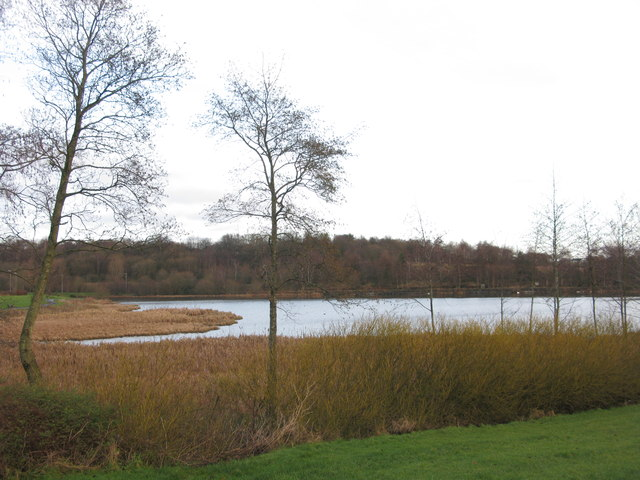
Garnqueen Loch (2014)

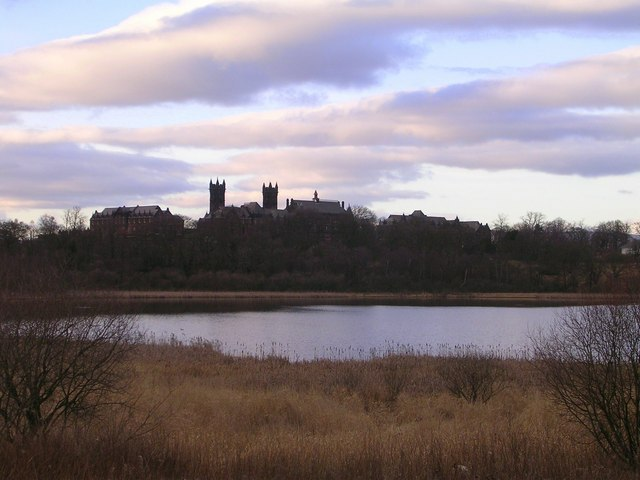
Bishop Loch and Gartloch Hospital (2006)
