= Thomas Kerr (Scottish politician) =

Scottish politician (born 1996)

Thomas Kerr MSP
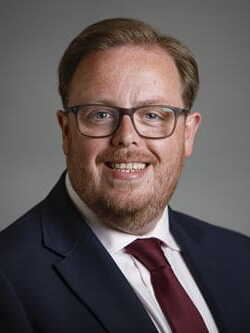
- Official portrait, 2026

Deputy Leader of Reform UK Scotland
- Incumbent
- Assumed office 9 May 2026
- Leader: Malcolm Offord
- Preceded by: Office established

Member of the Scottish Parliament for Glasgow (1 of 7 Regional MSPs)
- Incumbent
- Assumed office 7 May 2026

Leader of the Scottish Conservative Group on Glasgow City Council
- In office 1 May 2019 – 16 January 2025
- Preceded by: David Meikle
- Succeeded by: Office abolished

Glasgow City Councillor for Shettleston (Ward 19)
- Incumbent
- Assumed office 4 May 2017
- Preceded by: Martin Neill

Reform Scotland Shadow portfolios
- 2026–present: Shadow Cabinet Secretary for Housing, Community Cohesion, Public Safety and Drugs
- 2026: Shadow Cabinet Secretary for Social Justice and Housing

Personal details
- Born: Thomas Jordan Kerr; 8 June 1996 (age 30) Glasgow, Scotland
- Party: Reform UK (2025–present)
- Other political affiliations: Scottish Conservatives (2011–2025)
- Children: 1

Thomas Jordan Kerr (born 8 June 1996) is a Scottish Reform UK politician. He has served as the Deputy Leader of Reform UK Scotland and been a Member of the Scottish Parliament (MSP) for the Glasgow region since 2026. Kerr was elected as a councillor in 2017 as a Scottish Conservative and served as the party's group leader on Glasgow City Council from 2019 until his defection to Reform UK in 2025, becoming the party's first councillor in Glasgow.

== Early life ==
Kerr was born on 8 June 1996. His mother Debra had struggled with heroin misuse prior to his birth, and so he lived with his grandparents, Margaret and Thomas, whilst he attended primary school. He lived with his mother again after she recovered, but when she relapsed, he stayed with his aunt Elaine before staying with his grandparents again. Kerr said he had an "on-off" relationship with his father Billy, who left when he was young and was a member of the Orange Order. His father also struggled with heroin addiction and died in 2016 at the age of 43 from drug-related causes.

Kerr was raised in Cranhill and attended Eastbank Academy in Shettleston. His interest in politics began at age 10, when he was taken to a protest against the Iraq War by his SNP-supporting aunt. After meeting his political hero, Scottish Labour MP Margaret Curran in 2008, Kerr began campaigning for his MSPs Paul Martin and Frank McAveety. However, after being told that he leaned more to the right politically and seeing Scottish Conservative leader Annabel Goldie on television, he contacted Conservative candidate for Glasgow Pollok Andrew Morrison and joined the party in 2011. In the lead-up to the 2014 Scottish independence referendum, he participated in the Better Together campaign.

== Political career ==
Kerr first unsuccessfully stood for Glasgow Shettleston in the 2016 Scottish Parliament election. He was elected as a councillor for Shettleston in the 2017 Glasgow City Council election and became the deputy leader of the Scottish Conservative group on the council. In May 2019, Kerr was elected leader of the group following David Meikle's resignation amid a controversy involving his wife, former SNP politician Natalie McGarry, who was convicted of embezzlement. This made Kerr the youngest leader of a council group in Scotland.

Kerr unsuccessfully stood for Glasgow East in the 2017 and 2019 United Kingdom general elections. In the 2021 Scottish Parliament election, he again failed to be elected in Glasgow Shettleston. Kerr retained his council seat in the 2022 Glasgow City Council election, one of two Scottish Conservatives out of eight to do so, and stood for the party at the 2023 Rutherglen and Hamilton West by-election, where he finished a distant third. Kevin McKenna of The Herald who met him on the campaign trail wrote that he thought Kerr could be a future leader of the Scottish Conservatives. Kerr unsuccessfully contested Glasgow East for the third time in the 2024 United Kingdom general election.

In January 2025, he defected to Reform UK, becoming the party's first councillor in Glasgow. Kerr stated that the Conservatives were overly focused on criticising the SNP and "lacked a positive vision of centre-right conservatism". He added that Scottish Conservative leader Russell Findlay lacked control of the "broken" party. Findlay said the defection was "very disappointing". According to Holyrood, a Conservative Party source indicated that Kerr's defection was influenced by the prospect of being placed at the top of Reform UK's Glasgow list.

Scottish Labour leader Anas Sarwar claimed that Reform MSP Graham Simpson had called Kerr a "weasel". Simpson denied the claim, and insisted he had called Kerr a "lion". Kerr was allegedly shoved whilst handing out leaflets during the campaign. He unsuccessfully stood for Glasgow Baillieston and Shettleston in the 2026 Scottish Parliament election finishing second behind the SNP's David Linden, but he was elected as a list MSP. He was also elected as Reform UK Scotland's first deputy leader by fellow Reform MSPs.

In 2026, Kerr stated that he would "really welcome" the opportunity to join the far-right vigilante group Scots Active on a street patrol.

== Personal life ==
Kerr and his former fiancée have a son. He is in a relationship with fellow Reform UK politician Aimee Alexander.
