= 2008 Glasgow East by-election =

2008 UK Parliamentary by-election

- 24 July 2008

Glasgow East parliamentary seat
- Turnout: 42.25%
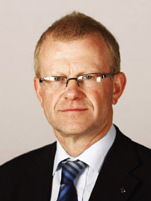

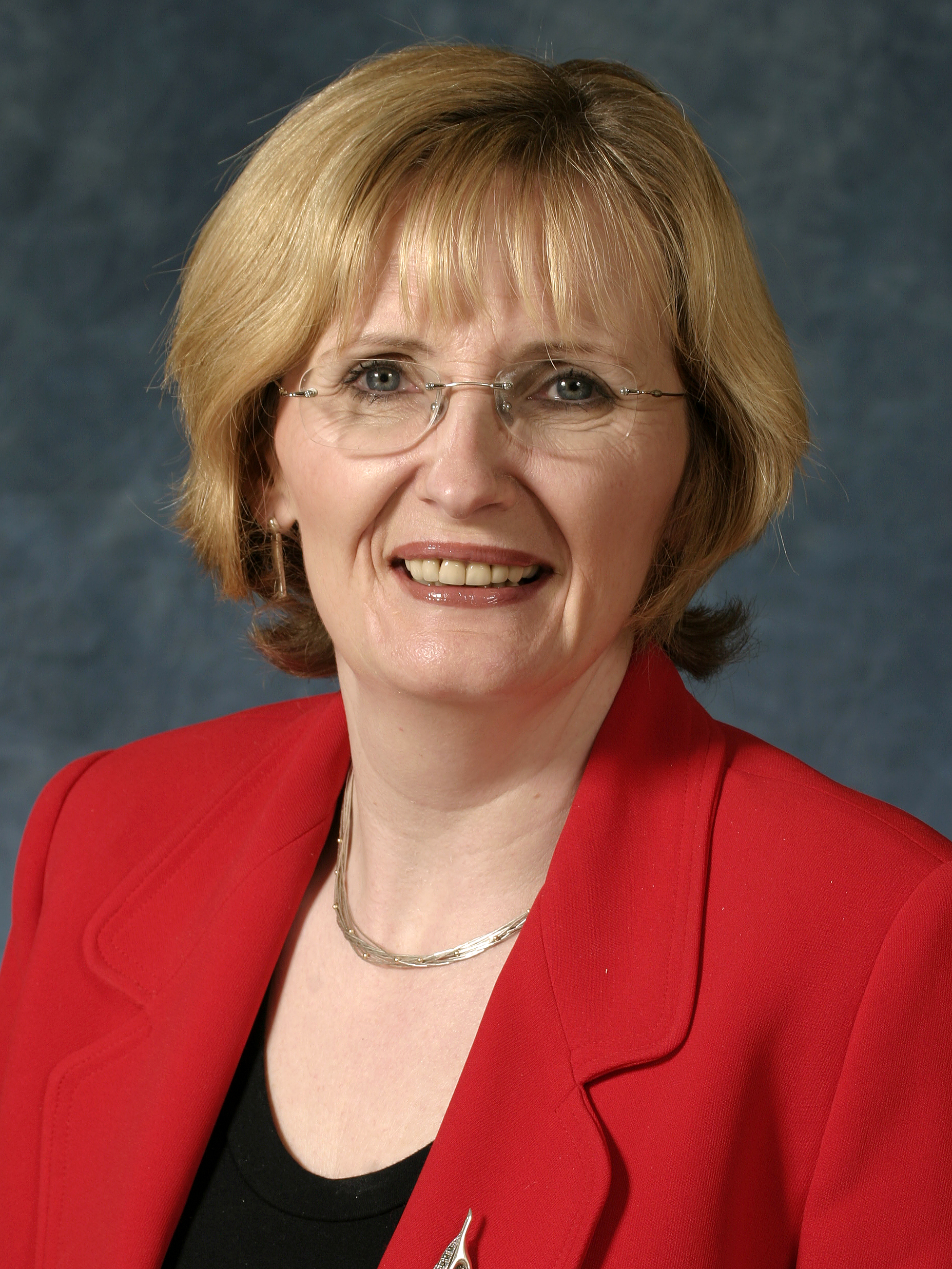
	First party	Second party	Third party
			Con
Candidate	John Mason	Margaret Curran	Davena Rankin
Party	SNP	Labour	Conservative
Popular vote	11,277	10,912	1,639
Percentage	43.1%	41.7%	6.3%
Swing	▲26.1%	▼19.0%	▼0.6%
MP before election
David Marshall
Labour
Subsequent MP
John Mason
SNP

A by-election for the United Kingdom parliamentary constituency of Glasgow East was held on 24 July 2008, triggered by the resignation of incumbent Labour Party MP David Marshall, who stood down on health grounds. It was won by Scottish National Party candidate John Mason, who defeated Labour's Margaret Curran.

The election was significant as it was the second safe Labour seat to be contested, and to be lost, since a downturn in political fortunes for the incumbent Labour government under the premiership of Gordon Brown, and was also held in the wake of the resignation of Scottish Labour leader Wendy Alexander. The seat was the third-safest Labour seat in Scotland, and their 26th safest seat in the UK. Curran subsequently regained the seat for Labour at the 2010 general election.

== Result ==
2008 Glasgow East by-election
Party	Candidate	Votes	%	±%
SNP	John Mason	11,277	43.1	+26.1
Labour	Margaret Curran	10,912	41.7	−19.0
Conservative	Davena Rankin	1,639	6.3	−0.6
Liberal Democrats	Ian Robertson	915	3.5	−8.3
Scottish Socialist	Frances Curran	555	2.1	−1.4
Solidarity	Tricia McLeish	512	2.0	New
Green	Eileen Duke	232	0.9	New
Independent	Chris Creighton	67	0.3	New
Freedom-4-Choice	Hamish Howitt	65	0.2	New
Majority		365	1.4	N/A
Turnout		26,219	42.25	−5.95
SNP gain from Labour		Swing	+22.5	

== History ==
The Glasgow East constituency was created for the 2005 general election. Its area came from the majority of the Glasgow Baillieston constituency, with the remainder formed from the Glasgow Shettleston constituency. It is one of the most deprived constituencies in the UK, with 30% of the working-age population on unemployment or incapacity benefit and nearly 40% of children growing up in homes where there is no adult in paid employment.

At the 2005 general election, the new Glasgow East seat was Labour's 26th safest seat in terms of percentage majority, and within Scotland, the seat at which it received its second-highest share of the vote. At the 2005 general election, Labour defeated the Scottish National Party by a majority of 13,507 votes, who beat the Liberal Democrats to third place by 1,603 votes.

Prior to his 2005 win at Glasgow East, Marshall had continually held the predecessor seat of Glasgow Shettleston since 1979. Shettleston had been held continuously by previous Labour Party members since an Independent Labour Party member defected to Labour in 1947. The Glasgow Baillieston constituency, and its predecessor seat Glasgow Provan, had always returned Labour MPs since its creation in 1955.

At the 2007 Scottish parliamentary election, Labour lost power to the SNP, who formed a minority government. At this election, the SNP Deputy First Minister Nicola Sturgeon won the neighbouring Glasgow Govan Scottish Parliament constituency with a swing from Labour of 10.7%, while all other Glasgow constituencies remained in Labour control.

On 28 June 2008, Marshall informed local party leaders that he would be stepping down on medical advice, after 10 weeks of sick leave from the House of Commons. On 30 June 2008 Marshall accepted the post of Steward and Bailiff of the Manor of Northstead, a device allowing him in effect to resign as an MP, triggering the by-election

== Political situation ==
The election gained attention throughout the UK due to worsening results for Labour during 2008. The Daily Record had asserted that if Labour lost the by-election, further pressure would be heaped on Gordon Brown.

The by-election followed a run of poor results since May, in the Crewe and Nantwich and Henley by-elections in England, English and Welsh local elections and losing the London mayoralty. By the end of May, Labour had registered its worst ever independent opinion poll result since records began in 1943, of 23%. Labour also declined to field a candidate in the Haltemprice and Howden by-election in England 14 days previously, fought over a recent controversial government anti-terrorism bill. The by-election also came within days of the controversial resignation of the Scottish Labour leader Wendy Alexander, with voting for a replacement not taking place before polling.

Turnout is usually lower in by-elections; at the previous general election turnout was 48% but was down just under 6% at 42.25%. Voter share was likely to have been distributed differently, with nine candidates standing for this election, compared to five in 2005. Turnout was higher than expected, despite the election being held during the school holidays, and during a traditional Glasgow holiday period.

In a Scotland-wide opinion poll of Westminster voting intentions, released on 11 July, the SNP was on 33%, with Labour on 29%, Conservatives on 20% Lib Dem on 14%.

However, in an opinion poll conducted solely within the Glasgow East constituency, released on 12 July, Labour led on 47%, SNP on 33%, Liberal Democrats on 9% and the Conservatives on 7%.

== Candidates ==
When nominations closed, there were nine candidates.

The SNP chose John Mason, a longtime resident of the constituency, and leader of the opposition on Glasgow City Council.

The Labour Party had some difficulty finding a candidate. The most likely initial choice, local councillor George Ryan, failed to attend a selection meeting. The position was then offered to Steven Purcell, the Labour leader of Glasgow council, then Lesley Quinn and Frank McAveety, the party's general secretary and the MSP for Glasgow Shettleston respectively, but all turned it down . The position was eventually accepted by fifth-choice candidate Margaret Curran, MSP for Glasgow Baillieston, on 7 July.

The Green Party selected Eileen Duke, a retired GP and co-convenor of the party's local branch, on 5 July. The Scottish Socialist Party stood Frances Curran, a former MSP who originally came from the east end of Glasgow. Solidarity stood Tricia McLeish, a trade union activist who lived in the constituency.

Howitt stood under the label "Freedom-4-Choice", a minor party of his own creation, having stood under the same title in the Haltemprice and Howden by-election.

== Aftermath ==
Leaked diplomatic cables later disclosed that senior US diplomats perceived Gordon Brown to be "finished" following the result.

Curran would subsequently defeat Mason and regain the seat for Labour in the 2010 general election with a majority of almost 12,000, only to be defeated herself by the SNP in 2015.

== 2005 UK election result ==
The seat was created at the 2005 election.

General election 2005: Glasgow East
Party	Candidate	Votes	%	±%
Labour	David Marshall	18,775	60.7	−3.0
SNP	Lachlan McNeill	5,268	17.0	−0.1
Liberal Democrats	David Jackson	3,665	11.8	+6.0
Conservative	Carl Thomson	2,135	6.9	+0.8
Scottish Socialist	George Savage	1,096	3.5	−3.4
Majority		13,507	43.7	−2.9
Turnout		30,939	48.2	
Labour win (new seat)				
