= Glasgow Baillieston and Shettleston =

Constituency of the Scottish Parliament

- Burgh constituency for the Scottish Parliament
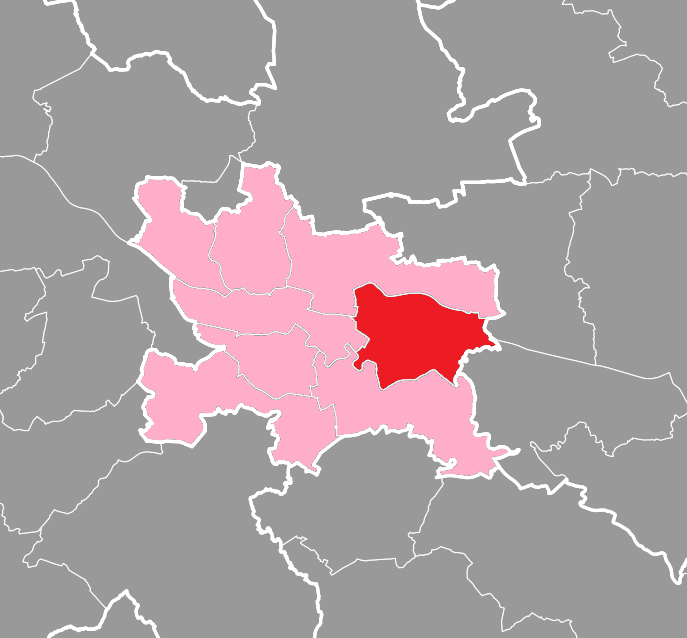

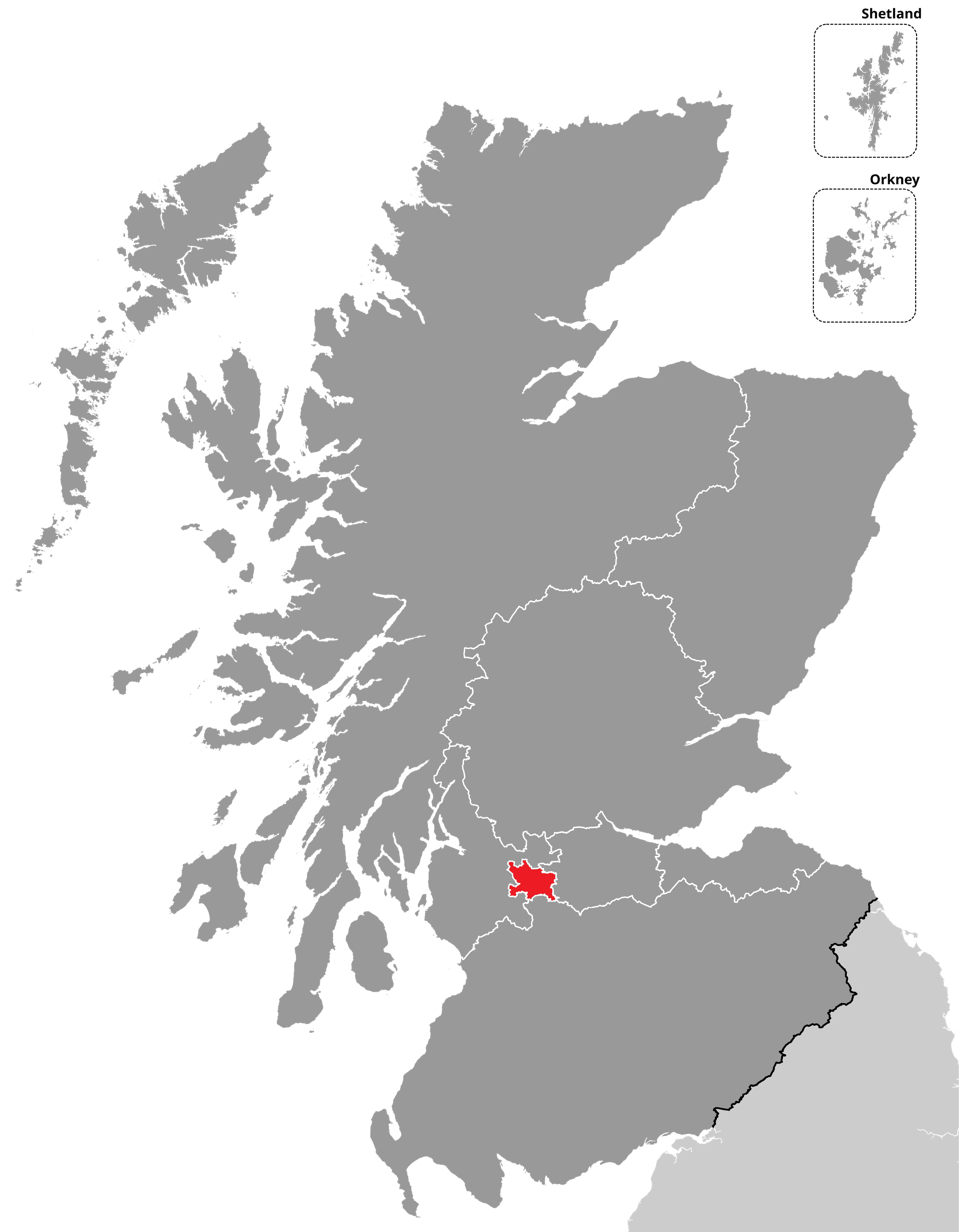
- Glasgow Baillieston and Shettleston shown within the Glasgow electoral region and the region shown within Scotland
- Electoral region: Glasgow
- Electorate: 58,372 (2026)
- Major settlements: Glasgow

Current constituency
- Created: 2026
- Seats: 1
- Party: Scottish National Party
- MSP: David Linden
- Council area: City of Glasgow
- Created from: Glasgow Shettleston and Glasgow Provan

Glasgow Baillieston and Shettleston is a burgh constituency of the Scottish Parliament which elects one Member of the Scottish Parliament (MSP) by the first past the post method of election. Under the additional-member electoral system used for elections to the Scottish Parliament, it is also one of eight constituencies in the Glasgow electoral region, which elects seven additional members, in addition to eight constituency MSPs, to produce a form of proportional representation for the region as a whole. The seat was created at the second periodic review of Scottish Parliament boundaries in 2025, and was first contested at the 2026 Scottish Parliament election. It covers areas that were formerly within the constituencies of Glasgow Provan and Glasgow Shettleston, which were abolished as a result of this review.

The constituency has been represented by David Linden of the Scottish National Party since the 2026 election.

== Electoral region ==
The other seven constituencies of the Glasgow region are Glasgow Anniesland, Glasgow Cathcart and Pollok, Glasgow Central, Glasgow Easterhouse and Springburn, Glasgow Kelvin and Maryhill, Glasgow Southside, and Rutherglen and Cambuslang. The region covers most of the Glasgow City council area, and a north-western portion of the South Lanarkshire council area.

== Constituency boundaries ==
Glasgow Baillieston and Shettleston is one of the eight constituencies covering the Glasgow City council area: Glasgow Anniesland, Glasgow Baillieston and Shettleston, Glasgow Cathcart and Pollok, Glasgow Central, Glasgow Easterhouse and Springburn, Glasgow Kelvin and Maryhill, Glasgow Southside, and Renfrewshire North and Cardonald (the latter also covering part of the Renfrewshire council area). The following electoral wards were used to define Glasgow Baillieston and Shettleston:

- East Centre (entire ward)
- Shettleston (entire ward)
- Baillieston (entire ward)

== Member of the Scottish Parliament ==
Election	Member	Party
2026	David Linden	SNP

== Election results ==
=== 2020s ===
2026 Scottish Parliament election: Glasgow Baillieston and Shettleston (Note: Note that changes in vote share are shown with respect to the notional result of the 2021 election, calculated to account for boundary changes)
Party	Candidate	Constituency			Regional		
Party	Candidate	Votes	%	±%	Votes	%	±%
SNP	David Linden	12,075	44.7	▼8.7	8,020	29.6	▼18.9
Reform	Thomas Kerr (Note: Elected on the party list)	6,972	25.8	New	6,541	24.2	▲24.0
Labour Co-op	Pauline McNeill (Note: McNeill is standing on a joint ticket on behalf of Scottish Labour and the Scottish Co-operative Party.) (Note: Incumbent member on the party list, or for another constituency)	5,885	21.8	▼6.8	5,154	19.0	▼5.6
Green					3,568	13.2	▲8.9
Conservative	John Murray	1,006	3.7	▼10.0	1,140	4.2	▼11.4
Liberal Democrats	Amy Carman	1,082	4.0	▲1.9	869	3.2	▲1.8
AtLS					442	1.6	
Independent Green Voice					322	1.2	
Independent	Craig Houston				287	1.1	
Scottish Family					200	0.7	
Scottish Socialist					177	0.7	
ISP					122	0.5	
Scottish Christian					99	0.4	
Workers Party					59	0.2	
UKIP					33	0.1	
Scottish Common Party					27	0.1	
Independent	Elspeth Kerr				20	0.1	
Majority		5,103	18.9				
Valid votes		27,020			27,080		
Invalid votes		135			65		
Turnout		27,155	46.5		27,145	46.5	
SNP win (new seat)							
Notes

2021 notional result (Note: Estimate of the 2021 Scottish election result as if the revised boundaries for 2026 were in place)
Party	Vote	%
SNP	17,187	53.4
Labour	9,217	28.6
Conservative	4,422	13.7
Liberal Democrats	677	2.1
Green	669	2.1
Majority	7,970	24.8
Turnout	32,172	50.5
Electorate	63,669	

== See also ==
- List of Scottish Parliament constituencies and electoral regions (2026–)
- Politics of Glasgow
- Glasgow Baillieston (Scottish Parliament constituency)
- Glasgow Shettleston (Scottish Parliament constituency)
