= Alison Thewliss =

Scottish politician

Alison Thewliss MSP
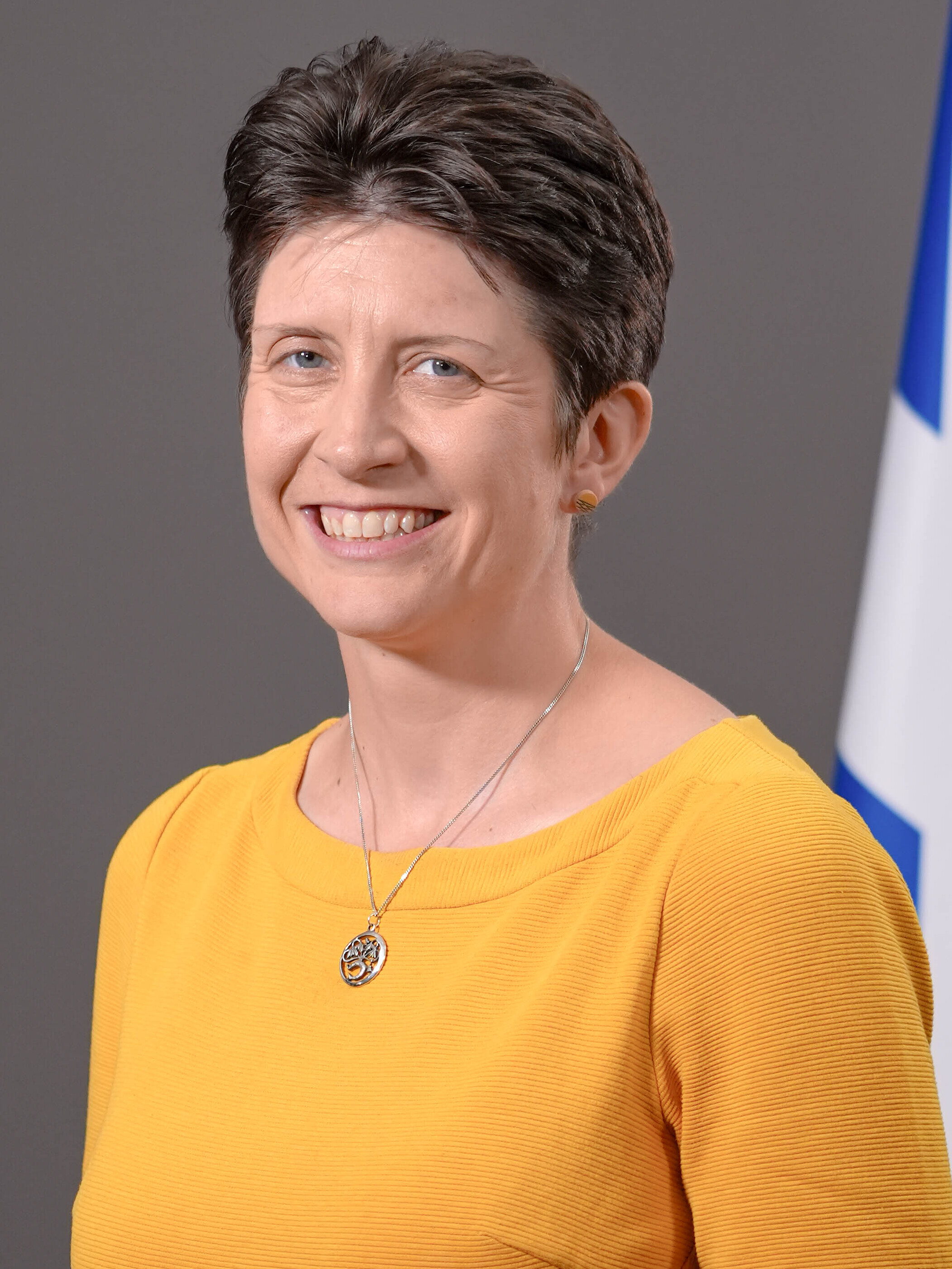
- Official portrait, 2026

Minister for Community Care
- Incumbent
- Assumed office 21 May 2026
- First Minister: John Swinney
- Preceded by: Jenni Minto

Member of the Scottish Parliament for Glasgow Central
- Incumbent
- Assumed office 7 May 2026
- Preceded by: Constituency established
- Majority: 9,991 (38.0%)

Member of Parliament for Glasgow Central
- In office 7 May 2015 – 30 May 2024
- Preceded by: Anas Sarwar
- Succeeded by: Constituency abolished

SNP Westminster portfolios
- 2022–2024: Home Affairs
- 2017–2022: Treasury
- 2018–2020: Housing, Communities and Local Government
- 2015–2018: Cities

Personal details
- Born: Alison Emily Thewliss; 13 September 1982 (age 43) Lanark, South Lanarkshire, Scotland
- Party: Scottish National Party
- Spouse: Joe Wright (m. 2008)
- Children: 2
- Education: University of Aberdeen (MA)
- Website: www.alisonthewliss.scot

Alison Emily Thewliss (born 13 September 1982) is a Scottish politician who has served as Minister for Community Care in the Scottish Government since 2026. She was also elected as a Member of the Scottish Parliament for Glasgow Central in 2026. A member of the Scottish National Party (SNP), she was a Member of Parliament in the British House of Commons for the equivalent seat from 2015 to 2024.

Born in Lanark, Thewliss studied at the University of Aberdeen, and from an early age became involved in politics, joining the SNP at seventeen. Having served as a researcher for Bruce McFee MSP, she was elected to local government in 2007, serving as a Glasgow City councillor for the Calton ward. Thewliss was elected to Westminster in the 2015 general election, where she represented the Glasgow Central constituency.

Thewliss served on the SNP's Westminster front opposition bench as the Treasury spokesperson from 2020 to 2022. She contested in 2022 leadership election for leader of the SNP in Westminster, but was defeated by Stephen Flynn. Flynn appointed Thewliss as home affairs spokesperson on his frontbench. In the 2024 general election, Labour won a landslide and Thewliss was one of many SNP MPs to lose her seat to Labour. In the 2026 Scottish Parliament election, she was elected to represent the Glasgow Central constituency and became a junior Scottish Minister.

== Early life and career ==
Alison Emily Thewliss was born in Lanark, South Lanarkshire, on 13 September 1982.

Thewliss attended Carluke High School and studied Politics and International Relations at the University of Aberdeen.

Thewliss was inspired to join the SNP at the age of seventeen following the 1997 Scottish devolution referendum. She was too young to vote in the referendum, but carried out an exit poll at a polling station as part of a Modern Studies project, which brought her into contact with representatives from Scottish political parties. Whilst still a student, she became involved in canvassing for the SNP at the 2003 Scottish Parliament election. A few months later, she was employed as a researcher for Bruce McFee MSP. By the time McFee had decided not to seek re-election in 2007, the party was looking for local election candidates. Thewliss agreed to stand for the Calton ward at the 2007 Glasgow City Council election which used a new multi-member ward system, and was one of 19 SNP candidates who gained seats previously held by Scottish Labour councillors under the previous single-member system. She was re-elected in 2012, but stood down as a councillor after being elected as MP for Glasgow Central at the 2015 general election.

== Parliamentary career ==
=== British House of Commons; 2015 to 2024 ===
==== Tax credits and the "rape clause" ====
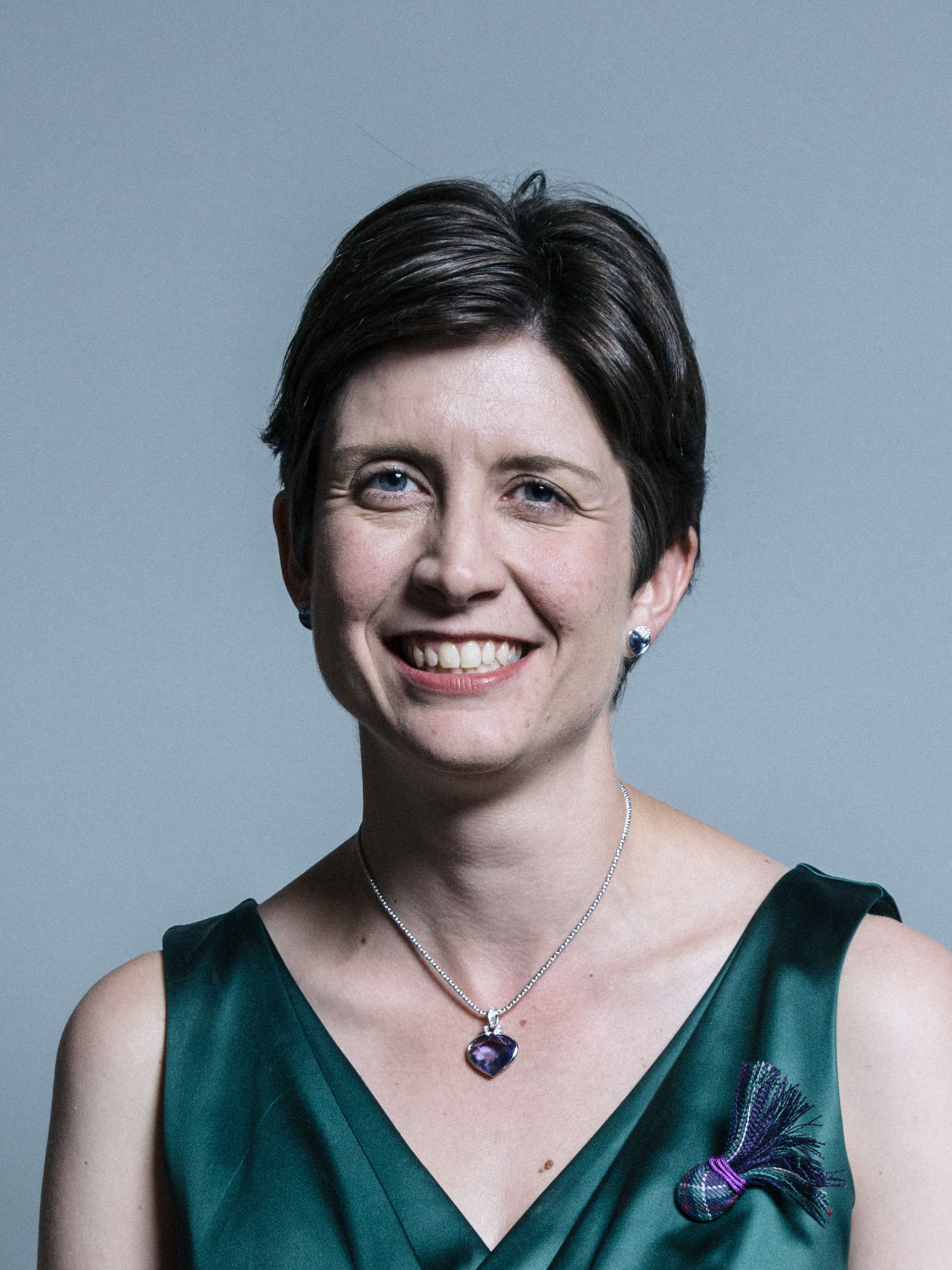
Official parliamentary portrait, 2017

Thewliss has campaigned on the issue of the government's revised tax credit policy restricting new claimants to two children from 2017, a policy which was introduced by then chancellor George Osborne in his July 2015 budget. She said shortly afterwards that the budget measure was "incredibly distasteful" as women who had been raped would need to justify their case when the child was their third. A requirement from April 2017 is for an explanation, tagged a "rape clause", of a woman's "exceptional circumstances" in such cases. Thewliss, who had intervened nine times in the Commons on the issue by January 2016, was among those who launched a poster campaign in Glasgow that month for the government to abandon the proposal.

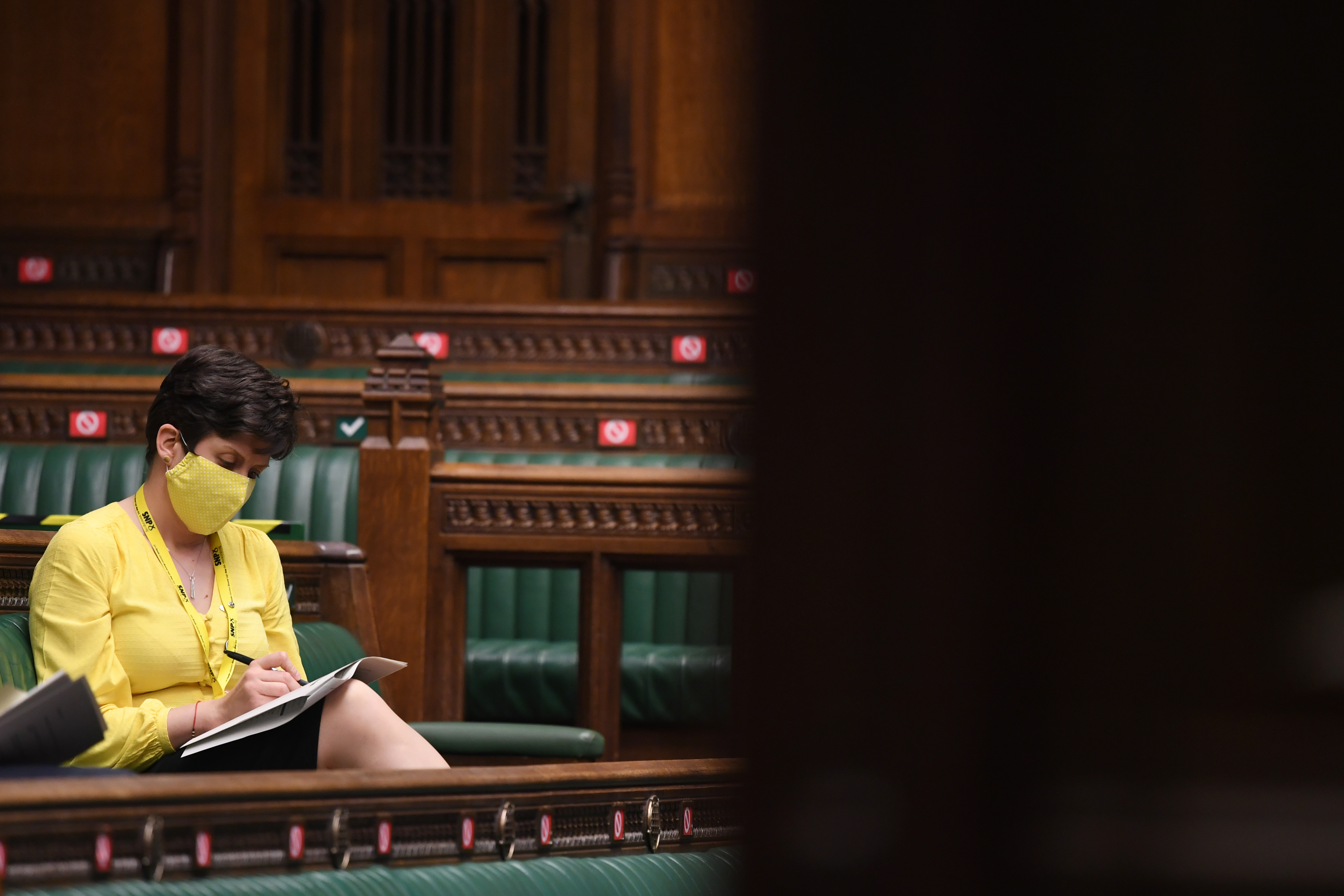
Thewliss sitting in the House of Commons, 2020

How women could claim was still unclear the month before the measure was introduced. Via parliamentary questions, Thewliss had found that the training of a "professional third party" was still not arranged. It had been recommended in a 2016 Department for Work and Pensions (DWP) consultation document. Her request for an emergency parliamentary debate on the issue was rejected in March 2017. As the policy came into force, she wrote of the women affected and government officials: "Will they accept her word, or will only a criminal conviction do? We don't yet know".

In October 2020, Thewliss was elected to the SNP National Executive Committee.

==== Leadership and selection contests ====
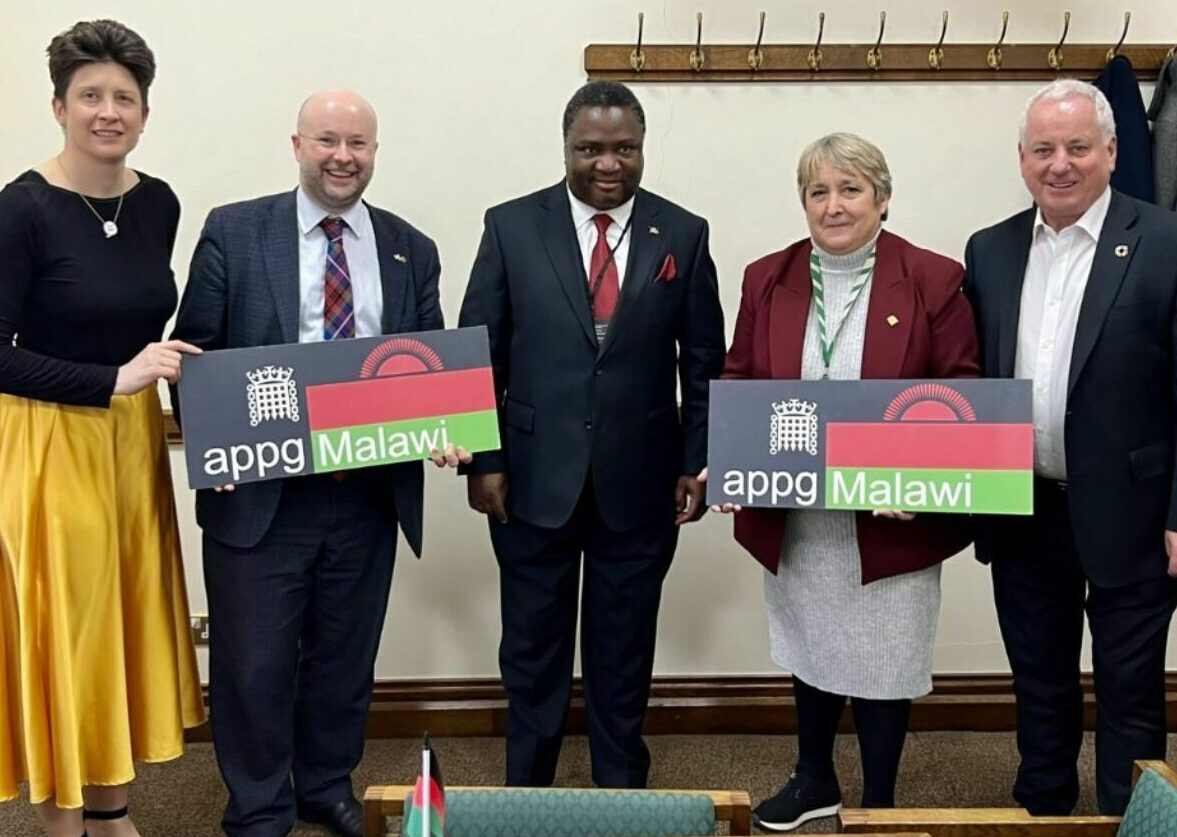
Thewliss, Patrick Grady, Malawi's High Commissioner Thomas Bisika, Christine Jardine and Lord Jack McConnell at a Scotland Malawi Partnership event in 2024

In December 2022, Thewliss came second to Stephen Flynn in the contest to succeed Ian Blackford in leading the SNP group in Westminster, after which she became the SNP shadow Home Affairs spokesperson.

Thewliss's constituency had no direct successor under the boundary review ahead of the 2024 general election, with its contents being distributed to five neighbouring constituencies.

The SNP has no automatic presumption sitting candidates will be reselected. On 25 August 2023, Patrick Grady, then SNP MP for Glasgow North was not approved to stand in the 2024 general election. In October 2023, Thewliss was one of five sitting SNP MPs involved in selection battles, running in both Glasgow North and Glasgow East. The latter, which contains the ward she had represented as a councillor, was against her SNP frontbench colleague David Linden, who had formerly worked for her. Thewliss was eventually selected as SNP candidate for the Glasgow North seat, however she was defeated at 2024 general election by Labour's Martin Rhodes.

=== Member of the Scottish Parliament; 2026 to present ===
Thewliss was elected in Glasgow Central in the 2026 Scottish Parliament election.

Upon her election, Thewliss was appointed as Minister for Community Care - a junior ministerial position in the Scottish Government.

== Personal life ==
Thewliss is married to Joe Wright, a software developer. The couple had a son in 2010 and a daughter in 2013.

Parliament of the United Kingdom
Preceded by Anas Sarwar	Member of Parliament for Glasgow Central; 2015–2024	Constituency abolished
