= David Linden (politician) =

Scottish politician

David Linden MSP
- Official portrait, 2026

Member of the Scottish Parliament for Glasgow Baillieston and Shettleston
- Incumbent
- Assumed office 7 May 2026
- Preceded by: Constituency established
- Majority: 5,103 (18.9%)

SNP Spokesperson for Social Justice in the House of Commons
- In office 10 December 2022 – 5 July 2024
- Leader: Stephen Flynn
- Preceded by: Kirsty Blackman

SNP Spokesperson for Work and Pensions in the House of Commons
- In office 1 February 2021 – 29 March 2022
- Leader: Ian Blackford
- Preceded by: Neil Gray
- Succeeded by: Kirsty Blackman

SNP Spokesperson for Housing, Communities and Local Government in the House of Commons
- In office 7 January 2020 – 1 February 2021
- Leader: Ian Blackford
- Preceded by: Office established
- Succeeded by: Patricia Gibson

Member of Parliament for Glasgow East
- In office 8 June 2017 – 30 May 2024
- Preceded by: Natalie McGarry
- Succeeded by: John Grady

Personal details
- Born: David Melvyn Linden; 14 May 1990 (age 36) Glasgow, Scotland
- Party: Scottish National Party
- Domestic partner: Cat Smith (since 2021)
- Relatives: Jordan Linden (cousin)

David Melvyn Linden (born 14 May 1990) is a Scottish National Party (SNP) politician who has served as Member of the Scottish Parliament for Glasgow Baillieston and Shettleston since May 2026. He previously served as the Member of Parliament (MP) for Glasgow East from the 2017 General Election until May 2024. He was the SNP Spokesperson for Work and Pensions from 2021 to 2022 and the Spokesperson for Housing, Communities and Local Government in the House of Commons from 2020 to 2021.

== Early life and education ==
David Linden was born on 14 May 1990 in Glasgow, Scotland. He grew up in Cranhill and Garrowhill, and was educated at Milncroft Primary School, Garrowhill Primary School and then Bannerman High School in Baillieston. He left school at the age of 16 and undertook an apprenticeship in Business Administration with Glasgow City Council. He worked for Glasgow Credit Union for two years.

== Political career ==
Linden was the national convenor for the youth wing of the Scottish National Party, SNP Youth and campaigned for Scottish independence in the 2014 independence referendum. Linden worked as a researcher for John Mason MSP. Between 2015 and 2017, he worked as a parliamentary assistant for Alison Thewliss, MP for Glasgow Central.

At the 2017 general election, Linden was elected as MP for Glasgow East with 38.8% of the vote and a majority of 75 votes.

Linden voted for the United Kingdom to remain within the EU during the 2016 UK EU membership referendum. In the indicative votes on 27 March 2019, he voted for a referendum on a Brexit withdrawal agreement.

At the 2019 general election, Linden was re-elected as MP for Glasgow East with an increased vote share of 47.7% and an increased majority of 5,566.

During his time in Parliament, Linden chaired the All-Party Parliamentary Group (APPG) on Premature and Sick Babies as well as the APPG on Nutrition for Growth.

In November 2020, Linden was reprimanded for using taxpayers' money to send 200 birthday cards to children turning 18, using prepaid envelopes embossed with a Westminster logo. A parliamentary inquiry said he had used them to promote himself and ordered him to pay back £147.34 in postage. Linden admitted he had breached the parliamentary code of conduct.

In November 2021, the defence secretary, Ben Wallace, accused a delegation of MPs, including Linden, of conduct that "put military personnel in a difficult position" after drinking in an airport departure lounge and once in the air during a visit to Gibraltar-based soldiers. They were also accused of being impolite to airport staff. An SNP spokesman denied the allegations, describing them as "false".

In October 2023, Linden was re-selected as the SNP candidate for Glasgow East at the 2024 general election. He was defeated in his bid for re-election, and lost his seat to John Grady of the Labour Party.

Linden was the SNP candidate for the Glasgow Baillieston and Shettleston constituency at the 2026 Scottish Parliament election. He was elected constituency MSP.

== Electoral record ==
General election 2024: Glasgow East
Party	Candidate	Votes	%	±%
Labour	John Grady	15,543	43.8	+10.4
SNP	David Linden	11,759	33.2	−15.5
Green	Amy Kettyles	2,727	7.7	+6.3
Reform	Donnie McLeod	2,371	6.7	+6.6
Conservative	Thomas Kerr	1,707	4.8	−7.5
Liberal Democrats	Matthew Clark	872	2.5	−1.6
Scottish Socialist	Liam McLaughlan	466	1.3	New
Majority		3,784	10.6	N/A
Turnout		35,445	51.4	−7.6
Registered electors		68,988		
Labour gain from SNP		Swing	+13.0	

General election 2019: Glasgow East
Party	Candidate	Votes	%	±%
SNP	David Linden	18,357	47.7	+8.9
Labour	Kate Watson	12,791	33.2	−5.4
Conservative	Thomas Kerr	5,709	14.8	−4.0
Liberal Democrats	James Harrison	1,626	4.2	+2.6
Majority		5,566	14.5	+14.3
Turnout		38,483	57.1	+2.5
SNP hold		Swing	+7.1	

General election 2017: Glasgow East
Party	Candidate	Votes	%	±%
SNP	David Linden	14,024	38.8	−18.1
Labour	Kate Watson	13,949	38.6	+6.2
Conservative	Thomas Kerr	6,816	18.8	+12.8
Liberal Democrats	Matthew Clark	567	1.6	+0.9
UKIP	John Ferguson	502	1.4	−1.2
Independent	Karin Finegan	158	0.4	New
SDP	Steven Marshall	148	0.4	New
Majority		75	0.2	−24.3
Turnout		36,175	54.6	−5.7
SNP hold		Swing	−12.2	

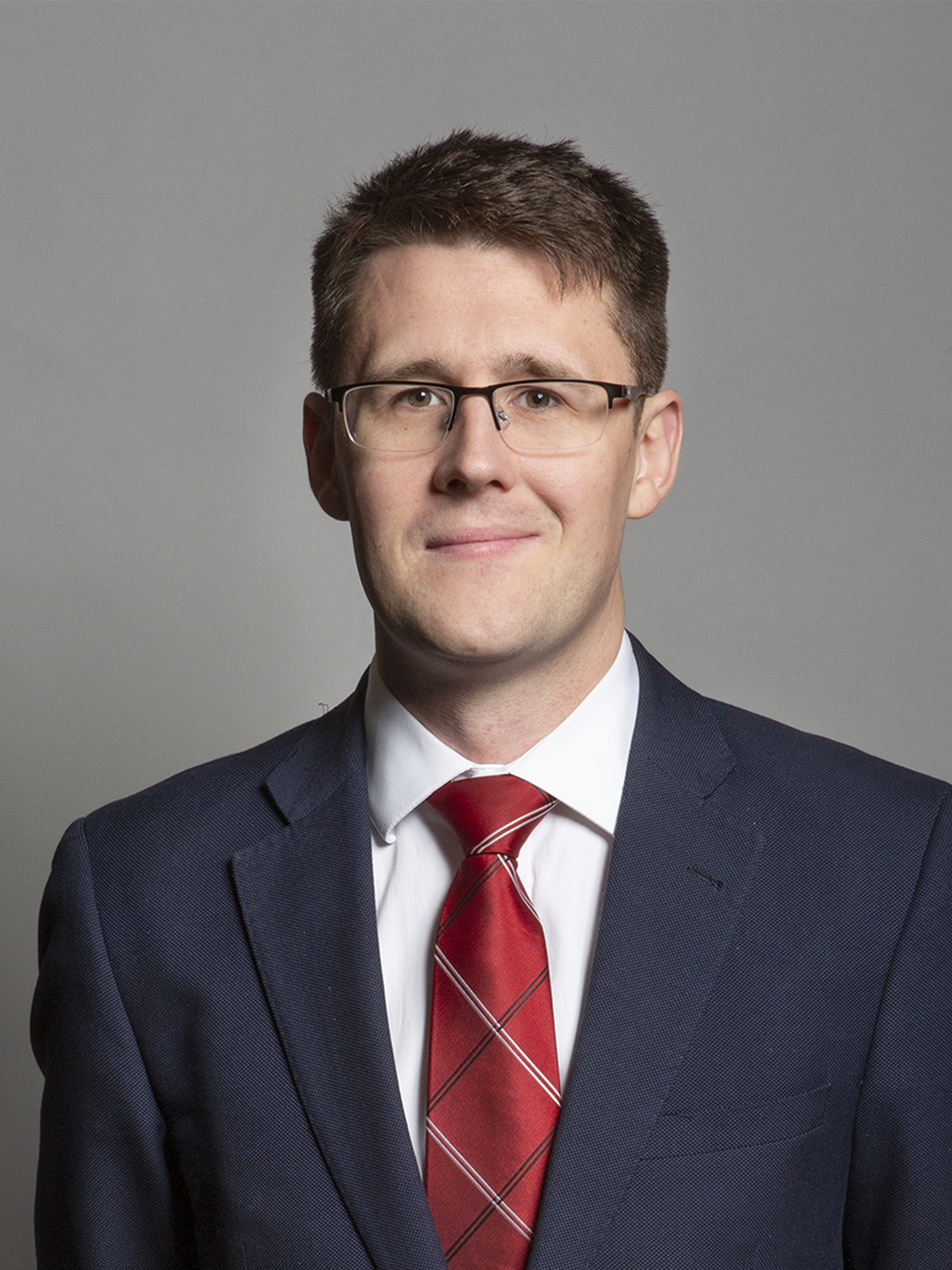
MP portrait, 2019

== Out of office 2024-26 ==
Following his defeat at the 2024 UK General Election, Linden was appointed as Senior Director of Public Affairs at the Good Faith Partnership, and later as managing director at management consultancy firm Milncroft Limited.

== Personal life ==
Linden is the father to two children with his first wife, Roslyn, whom he married in 2012. As of September 2021, Linden is in a relationship with Labour Party MP Cat Smith. He is the cousin of Jordan Linden.

In his spare time, Linden enjoys fishing, and is a fan of Airdrieonians Football Club.

Parliament of the United Kingdom
Preceded by Natalie McGarry	Member of Parliament for Glasgow East; 2017–2024	Succeeded by John Grady
