= Glasgow Shettleston =

Glasgow Shettleston may refer to:

- Glasgow Shettleston (UK Parliament constituency)
- Glasgow Shettleston (Scottish Parliament constituency)
