= Glasgow Baillieston =

Glasgow Baillieston may refer to:

- Baillieston
- Glasgow Baillieston (Scottish Parliament constituency), 1999–2011
- Glasgow Baillieston (UK Parliament constituency), 1997–2005
