= Margaret Curran =

British politician (born 1958)

The Right Honourable The Baroness Curran
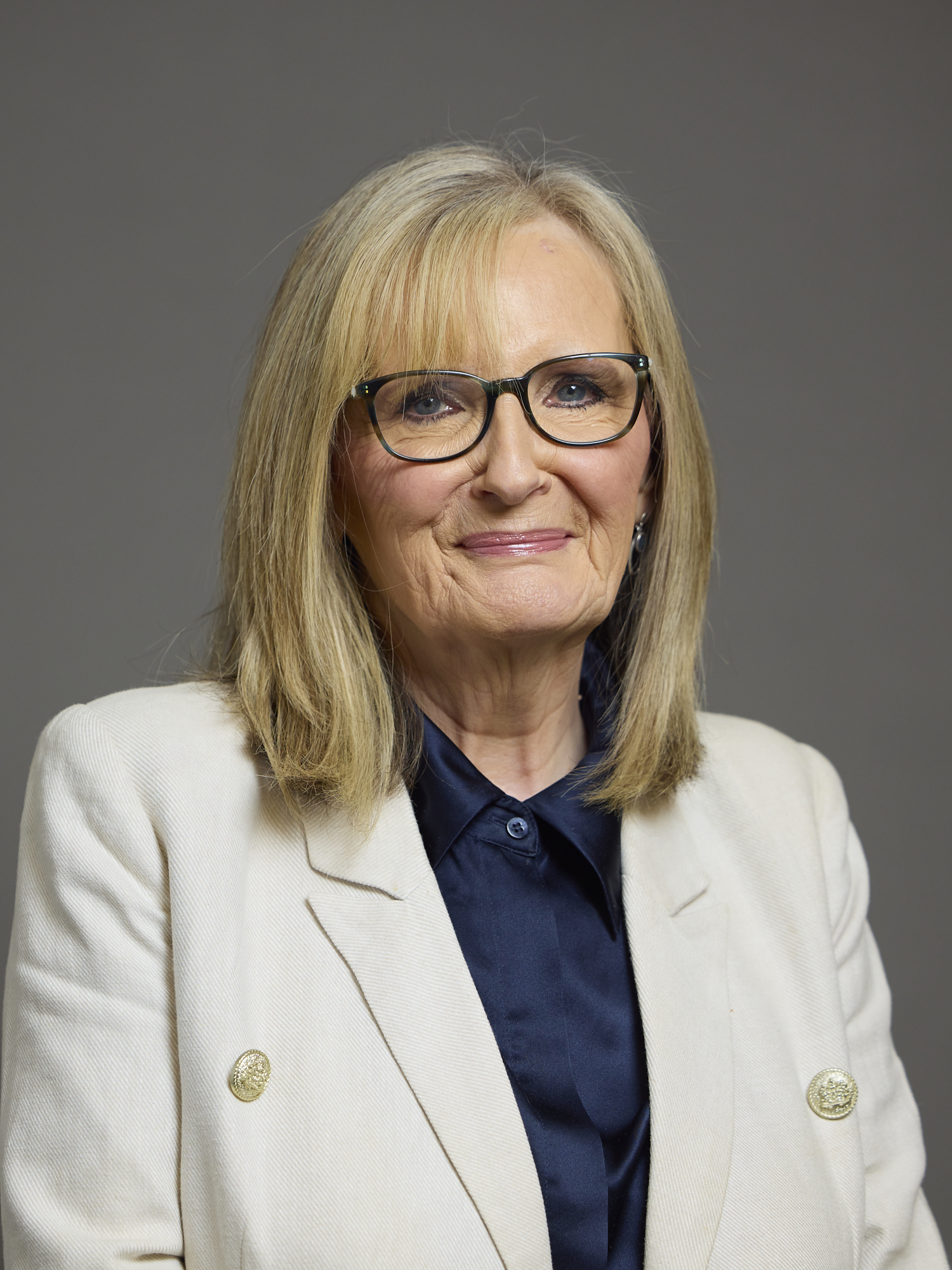
- Official portrait, 2025

Parliamentary Under-Secretary of State for Energy Security and Net Zero
- Incumbent
- Assumed office 21 July 2026
- Prime Minister: Andy Burnham
- Preceded by: The Lord Whitehead

Baroness-in-Waiting Government Whip
- In office 12 June 2026 – 21 July 2026
- Prime Minister: Keir Starmer
- Preceded by: The Lord Leong

Minister of State for Energy Security and Net Zero
- In office 22 May 2025 – 6 June 2025
- Prime Minister: Keir Starmer
- Preceded by: The Lord Hunt of Kings Heath
- Succeeded by: The Lord Whitehead

Shadow Secretary of State for Scotland
- In office 7 October 2011 – 11 May 2015
- Leader: Ed Miliband
- Preceded by: Ann McKechin
- Succeeded by: Ian Murray

Shadow Minister for Disabled People
- In office 7 October 2010 – 8 October 2011
- Leader: Ed Miliband
- Preceded by: Mark Harper
- Succeeded by: Anne McGuire

Minister for Parliamentary Business
- In office 4 October 2004 – 17 May 2007
- First Minister: Jack McConnell
- Preceded by: Patricia Ferguson
- Succeeded by: Bruce Crawford (2011)

Minister for Communities
- In office 9 May 2002 – 4 October 2004
- First Minister: Jack McConnell
- Preceded by: Iain Gray
- Succeeded by: Malcolm Chisholm

Member of the House of Lords
- Lord Temporal
- Life peerage 15 January 2025

Member of Parliament for Glasgow East
- In office 6 May 2010 – 30 March 2015
- Preceded by: John Mason
- Succeeded by: Natalie McGarry

Member of the Scottish Parliament for Glasgow Baillieston
- In office 6 May 1999 – 22 March 2011
- Preceded by: Constituency established
- Succeeded by: Constituency abolished

Personal details
- Born: Margaret Patricia Curran; 24 November 1958 (age 67) Glasgow, Scotland
- Party: Labour
- Spouse: Rab Murray
- Children: 2, including Chris
- Education: University of Glasgow

Margaret Patricia Curran, Baroness Curran (born 24 November 1958), is a Scottish Labour Party politician who has served as Parliamentary Under-Secretary of State in the Department for Energy Security and Net Zero since 2026. She served in the House of Commons as the Member of Parliament (MP) for Glasgow East from 2010 and 2015, and was Shadow Secretary of State for Scotland from 2011 until 2015.

Curran was previously the member of the Scottish Parliament (MSP) for Glasgow Baillieston from 1999 to 2011, and held a number of posts within the Scottish Executive, including as Minister for Parliamentary Business, Minister for Social Justice, and Minister for Communities. She also served as Minister of State in the Department for Energy Security and Net Zero from May to June 2025.

== Early life and education ==
Curran was born in Glasgow, the daughter of Irish parents James Curran and Rose McConnellogue. She was educated at Our Lady and St Francis School in Glasgow.

Curran attended the University of Glasgow, where she graduated with an MA degree in History and Economic History in 1981. She first became politically active in the university's Labour Club in the late 1970s, where she was associated with future Scottish Labour leader Johann Lamont and future Labour MSP Sarah Boyack. She held several posts in Labour student politics, including secretary and vice-chair of Glasgow University Labour Club, and chair and secretary of the Scottish Organisation of Labour Students. In 1977, she was involved in the unsuccessful campaign to elect Hortensia Allende, the former First Lady of Chile, as Rector of the University of Glasgow.

She was a community worker, and then a lecturer in community education at the University of Strathclyde, a subject she holds a Certificate in. Curran was Mohammad Sarwar's election agent at Glasgow Govan for the 1997 general election. In 2021, Sarwar's son Anas became Leader of the Scottish Labour Party.

== Member of the Scottish Parliament ==
In 1999 Curran was elected to the new Scottish Parliament, and was promoted to a junior minister when Henry McLeish became First Minister and later became a member of the Scottish Executive. She served as convenor of the Social Inclusion committee, then was promoted to Deputy Minister for Social Justice. She then rose to become minister in that portfolio, which later changed to Minister for Communities, introducing the Homelessness (Scotland) Bill in September 2002. She held the position of Minister for Parliamentary Business from 2004 until 2007.

She was re-elected comfortably in 2003 and again in 2007. Given Scottish Labour's losses in that later election, she was widely viewed as a popular potential successor to Jack McConnell as its leader, but decided not to stand against Wendy Alexander. Curran pledged her support to Iain Gray who was standing against Cathy Jamieson and Andy Kerr. Iain Gray was voted Scottish Labour Party Leader and appointed Curran to manage the party's 2011 election manifesto. She stood down as MSP for Glasgow Baillieston at the 2011 Scottish election.

=== 2008 Glasgow East by-election ===
On 30 June 2008, David Marshall, MP for Glasgow East, resigned from the House of Commons on grounds of ill health, triggering a by-election. The Labour candidate for the by-election was to have been announced on 4 July, though the announcement was postponed when the likely choice, local councillor George Ryan, chose to withdraw from the nomination process. On 5 July, Curran placed herself forward for nomination on the Labour Party's shortlist and was confirmed as their candidate on 7 July. The by-election took place on 24 July 2008 and Curran was defeated by John Mason of the Scottish National Party by 365 votes. The swing from Labour was 22.54%.

== Member of Parliament ==
At the 2010 general election, Curran regained Glasgow East for Labour from the Scottish National Party. After her electoral victory was announced, she walked out with the other candidates from the platform, refusing to make a speech whilst sharing the platform with the British National Party candidate. From 2010 to 2011, she was Shadow Minister for Disabled People.

On 7 October 2011, in a Shadow Cabinet reshuffle, Labour Party leader Ed Miliband sacked Ann McKechin and appointed Curran as her replacement for Shadow Secretary of State for Scotland. Willie Bain, then-MP for Glasgow North East, also became Curran's new deputy as Shadow Scotland Office Minister, replacing Tom Greatrex.

At the 2015 general election, she lost her seat to Natalie McGarry of the Scottish National Party. This was a landslide defeat for Scottish Labour; who lost forty of the forty-one seats they were defending, and were reduced to a single MP at Westminster, with the SNP elected in 56 of Scotland's 59 seats. With many veteran Labour politicians losing their seats, including: then-Shadow Foreign Secretary Douglas Alexander and then-Scottish Labour Party Leader, Jim Murphy. Presenting speeches following their constituency's declaration, Curran declined to speak following the announcement of her own defeat.

=== Views on Alex Salmond ===
Curran was known to have a particularly difficult relationship with SNP leader Alex Salmond. In 2012, Curran accused Salmond and his government of having a "culture of casual dishonesty", and suggested his "blokeish attitude" made him a liability among women in Scotland during the Scottish independence referendum campaign. In November 2011, she told Holyrood magazine that were Salmond to be killed by being run over by a bus, she would have no interest in finding out who the driver was. In April 2014, she dismissed Salmond's appeal to female voters, saying "Women will see through his cynical attempts to win them over" and described a speech he made as "drivel". Speaking about a work programme whilst in Dundee, Curran stated "Every time I'm in Dundee people have raised their disappointment with the former First Minister over his promise. Renewable energy is a sector Dundee badly needs and the city has been let down badly by his retreat from promise. I think Alex Salmond should apologise to the people of Dundee". These comments related to the fact that only 15% of Work Programme participants had proceeded to find a job.

== House of Lords ==
Curran was nominated for a life peerage by Prime Minister Keir Starmer in late 2024. She was created Baroness Curran, of Townhead in the City of Glasgow, on 15 January 2025, and was introduced to the House of Lords on 16 January.

=== Ministerial Role ===
In May 2025, Curran was appointed Minister of State in the Department for Energy Security and Net Zero. She was responsible for nuclear energy, planning decisions, and all parliamentary business in the House of Lords. She left on 6 June, citing health reasons.

Baroness Curran was appointed to the Starmer ministry Baroness in Waiting (Government Whip) on 12 June 2026.

== Personal life ==
She and her husband Robert "Rab" Murray live in Glasgow with their two sons. Curran listed her recreations in Who's Who as "reading, theatre, American politics" and "spending time with my sons".

Her son Chris Murray has been the Labour MP for Edinburgh East and Musselburgh since the 2024 general election.

Scottish Parliament
New parliament Scotland Act 1998	Member of the Scottish Parliament for Glasgow Baillieston; 1999–2011	Constituency abolished
Parliament of the United Kingdom
Preceded by John Mason	Member of Parliament for Glasgow East; 2010–2015	Succeeded by Natalie McGarry
Political offices
Preceded by Iain Gray	Minister for Social Justice; 2002–2003	Office abolished
New office	Minister for Communities; 2003–2004	Succeeded by Malcolm Chisholm
Preceded by Patricia Ferguson	Minister for Parliamentary Business; 2004–2007	Succeeded by Bruce Crawford
Preceded by Ann McKechin	Shadow Secretary of State for Scotland; 2011–2015	Succeeded by Ian Murray
