= Glasgow Central (Scottish Parliament constituency) =

Constituency of the Scottish Parliament

- Burgh constituency for the Scottish Parliament
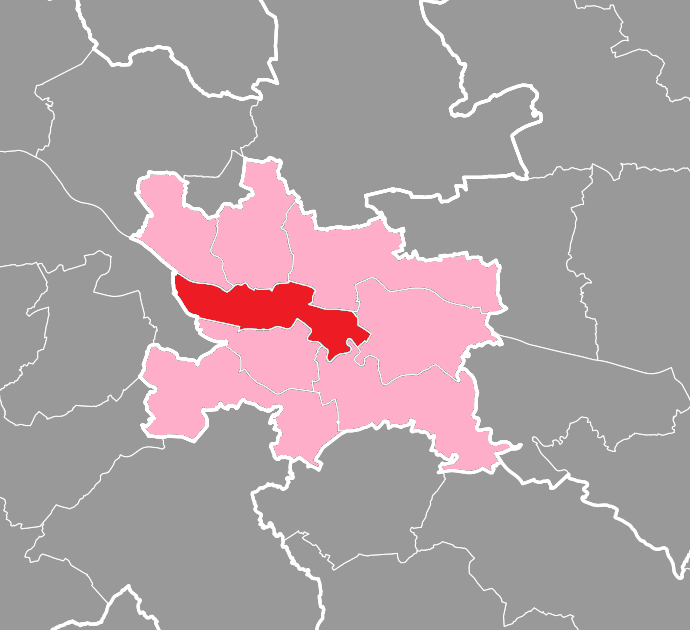

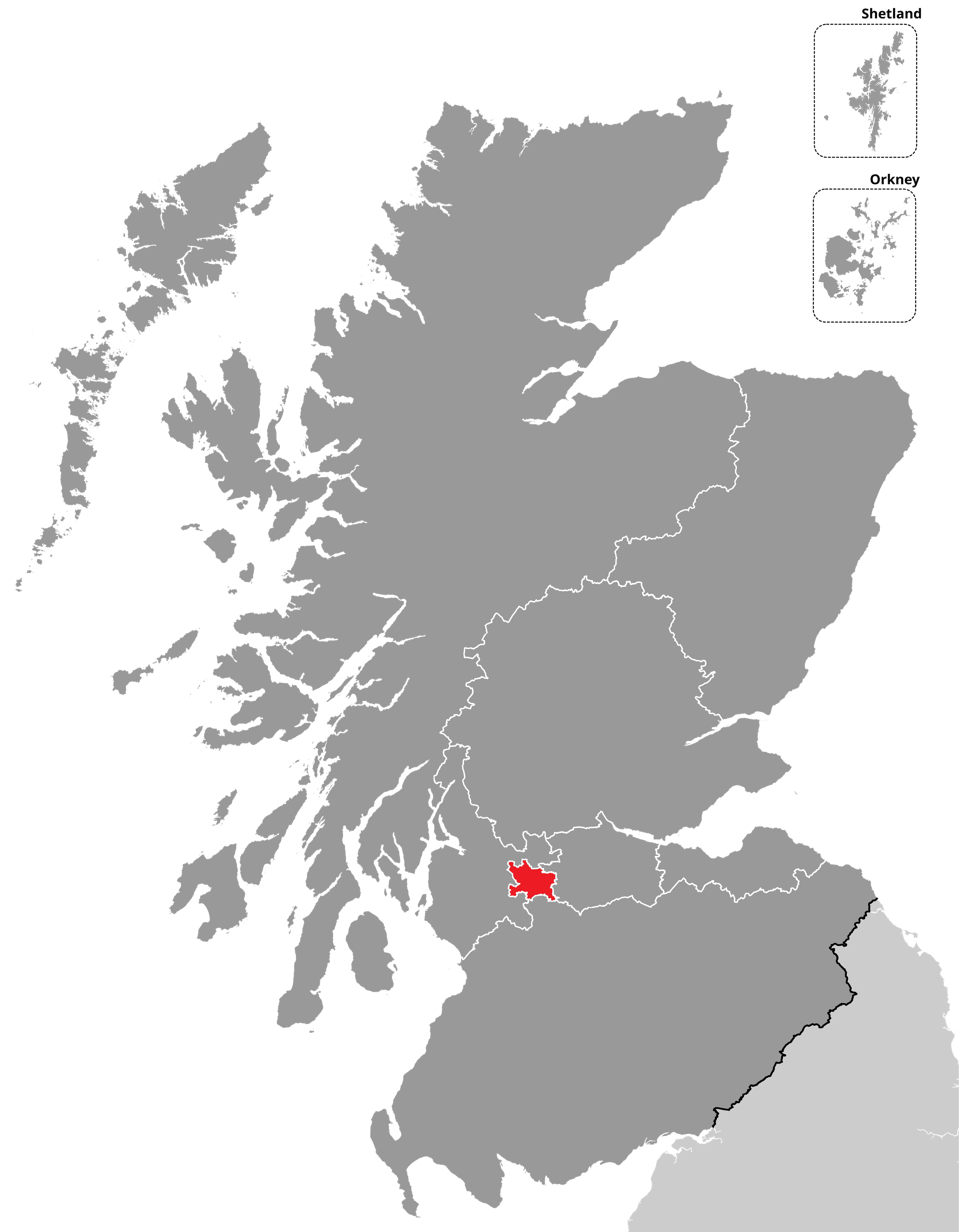
- Glasgow Central shown within the Glasgow electoral region and the region shown within Scotland
- Electoral region: Glasgow
- Electorate: 59,173 (2026)
- Major settlements: Glasgow

Current constituency
- Created: 2026
- Seats: 1
- Party: Scottish National Party
- MSP: Alison Thewliss
- Council area: City of Glasgow
- Created from: Glasgow Southside, Glasgow Kelvin and Glasgow Shettleston

Glasgow Central is a burgh constituency of the Scottish Parliament covering part of the City of Glasgow. It elects one Member of the Scottish Parliament (MSP) by the first past the post method of election. Under the additional-member electoral system used for elections to the Scottish Parliament, it is also one of eight constituencies in the Glasgow electoral region, which elects seven additional members, in addition to eight constituency MSPs, to produce a form of proportional representation for the region as a whole. The seat was created by the second periodic review of Scottish Parliament boundaries in 2025, and was first contested at the 2026 Scottish Parliament election. It covers areas that were formerly within the constituencies of Glasgow Kelvin and Glasgow Shettleston, which were abolished as a result of this review, along with areas taken from Glasgow Southside, which was redrawn.

The constituency has been represented by Alison Thewliss of the Scottish National Party since the 2026 election.

== Electoral region ==
The other seven constituencies of the Glasgow region are Glasgow Anniesland, Glasgow Baillieston and Shettleston, Glasgow Cathcart and Pollok, Glasgow Easterhouse and Springburn, Glasgow Kelvin and Maryhill, Glasgow Southside, and Rutherglen and Cambuslang. The region covers most of the Glasgow City council area, and a north-western portion of the South Lanarkshire council area.

== Constituency boundaries ==
Glasgow Cathcart and Pollok is one of the eight constituencies covering the Glasgow City council area: Glasgow Anniesland, Glasgow Baillieston and Shettleston, Glasgow Cathcart and Pollok, Glasgow Central, Glasgow Easterhouse and Springburn, Glasgow Kelvin and Maryhill, Glasgow Southside, and Renfrewshire North and Cardonald (the latter also covering part of the Renfrewshire council area). The following electoral wards were used to define Glasgow Central:

- Govan (entire ward)
- Southside Central (Shared with Glasgow Southside)
- Calton (entire ward)
- Anderston/City/Yorkhill (entire ward)

== Election results ==
=== 2020s ===
2026 Scottish Parliament election: Glasgow Central (Note: Note that changes in vote share are shown with respect to the notional result of the 2021 election, calculated to account for boundary changes)
Party	Candidate	Constituency			Regional		
Party	Candidate	Votes	%	±%	Votes	%	±%
SNP	Alison Thewliss	15,085	57.4	▲7.4	7,245	27.4	▼17.9
Green					8,327	31.5	▲15.5
Labour	Vonnie Sandlan	5,094	19.4	▼12.9	3,767	13.9	▼8.0
Reform	Paul Bennie	3,988	15.2	New	3,685	13.9	▲13.7
Liberal Democrats	Paul Kennedy	1,262	4.8	▲2.8	798	3.0	▲1.8
Conservative	Naveed Asghar	835	3.2	▼3.1	763	2.9	▼6.7
Independent Green Voice					400	1.5	
AtLS					374	1.4	
Independent	Craig Houston				323	1.2	
Scottish Family					190	0.7	
Scottish Socialist					183	0.7	
ISP					131	0.5	
Workers Party					111	0.4	
Scottish Christian					69	0.3	
Scottish Common Party					37	0.1	
Independent	Elspeth Kerr				27	0.1	
UKIP					22	0.1	
Majority		9,991	38.0				
Valid votes		26,264			26,452		
Invalid votes		271			123		
Turnout		26,535	44.8		26,575	44.9	
SNP win (new seat)							

== See also ==
- List of Scottish Parliament constituencies and electoral regions (2026–)
- Politics of Glasgow
- Glasgow Central (UK Parliament constituency)
