= John Mason (Scottish politician) =

Scottish politician (born 1957)

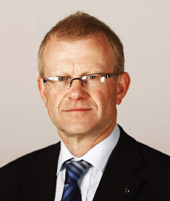

Deputy Convener of the Finance Committee
- In office 15 June 2011 – 8 April 2026
- Preceded by: Tom McCabe

Member of the Scottish Parliament for Glasgow Shettleston
- In office 5 May 2011 – 9 April 2026
- Preceded by: Frank McAveety
- Succeeded by: Constituency abolished

Member of Parliament for Glasgow East
- In office 24 July 2008 – 12 April 2010
- Preceded by: David Marshall
- Succeeded by: Margaret Curran

Glasgow City Councillor for: Garrowhill (Ward 48) (1998–2007) Baillieston (Ward 20) (2007–2008)
- In office 1998 – 25 July 2008
- Succeeded by: David Turner

Personal details
- Born: 15 May 1957 (age 69) Rutherglen, South Lanarkshire, Scotland
- Party: Independent (since 2024)
- Other political affiliations: Scottish National Party (until 2024)
- Education: Hutchesons' Grammar School, University of Glasgow
- Profession: Accountant
- Website: john-mason.org

John Fingland Mason (born 15 May 1957) is a Scottish independent politician who served as the Member of the Scottish Parliament (MSP) for Glasgow Shettleston from 2011 to 2026. He was a member of the Scottish National Party until his expulsion in 2024.

He was previously the Member of Parliament (MP) for Glasgow East from 2008 to 2010, and a Glasgow City Councillor from 1998 to 2008.

Mason has been involved with charity work, and he is an accountant. He is a practising Christian and believes abortion should not be allowed for social reasons. He has attracted significant controversy for beliefs and comments which critics deemed to be transphobic and homophobic. He also faced significant criticism for keeping his SNP (Scottish National Party) office open to the public during the COVID-19 pandemic lockdown, and for comments describing the Irish Republican Army as "freedom fighters". On 17 August 2024, he had the whip drawn for arguing that Israeli actions during the Gaza war did not amount to genocide.

== Background ==
Originally from Rutherglen, Mason has lived in the East End of Glasgow for 20 years. His father was an electrical engineer, and his mother a teacher. After attending Hutchesons' Grammar School, he studied Accounting at the University of Glasgow, becoming an ICAS Chartered Accountant.

He worked for housing associations, nursing homes, and with a charity in London. He also spent three years in Kathmandu, Nepal, with an NGO (United Mission to Nepal) representing churches from across the world.

== Councillor ==
Mason was elected as the councillor for the Garrowhill ward in Glasgow City Council at a by-election in 1998, and was re-elected in 1999 and 2003.

He rose to become the Leader of the Opposition in Glasgow City Council, and led the SNP Council Group on the majority Labour-run Council between 1999 and 2008. He was the SNP's longest-serving Glasgow councillor, and during his term, he led many protests against Labour's moves to weaken effective opposition by altering the council committee system.

In his ward, he attended a wide variety of community groups, including Garrowhill and Swinton Community Councils, local school boards, tenants association, and Garrowhill Action Partnership. He was also on the management committee of Tenant Controlled Housing, which aims to give local tenants control of their housing, in place of Glasgow Housing Association (GHA).

== Parliamentarian ==
=== Member of Parliament ===
On 30 June 2008, David Marshall, Labour MP for Glasgow East, resigned from the UK Parliament on the grounds of ill-health, thereby triggering a by-election. The decision by Labour to call a quick by-election (set for 24 July 2008) was partly attributed to Labour's troubled finances and fears of an SNP campaign building up enough momentum. John Mason was selected as SNP candidate for Glasgow East on 3 July. During the by-election, the candidate stance on abortion was displayed on noticeboards in catholic churches; Mason was reported to be opposed to abortion occurring for social reasons.

Mason won the by-election in a surprise victory, defeating the Labour candidate Margaret Curran, MSP for Glasgow Baillieston. He overturned a Labour majority of more than 13,500 to win the seat on a swing of more than 22%. It was Labour's third-safest seat in Scotland.

Mason resigned his council seat immediately following his election as MP. Mason served as the SNP's Westminster spokesperson on Work and Pensions during his tenure as an MP. From 2009 until losing his seat in 2010, he also sat on the House of Commons' Select Committee on Administration.

In an interview with The Guardian newspaper in April 2010, when questioned about his Protestant religious beliefs, and how that could conflict with the rights of others in the UK, Mason acknowledged the difficulty that this issue raised with him, informing the newspaper that he had been warned to leave this issue alone by his party,

Mason was the last MP to ask a spoken question of a Labour Prime Minister for 14 years, questioning Gordon Brown on a potential inquiry into corruption at Glasgow City Council at Brown's final Prime Minister's Questions on 7 April 2010.

=== Member of the Scottish Parliament ===
In the 2011 Scottish Parliament election, he won the Glasgow Shettleston constituency with a majority of 586 votes. He was re-elected in 2016 and in 2021, where he used his victory speech to pledge that he would work on "issues around transgender."

Journalist and sketchwriter Alex Massie described him as, "the well-meaning creationist SNP member for Glasgow East... Mr Mason is a Holyrood treasure, a great entertainer in the long tradition of impressively bumbling backbenchers who add to the gaiety of parliamentary proceedings."

== Controversies ==
=== Position on abortion ===
Mason opposes the expansion of abortion provision in Scotland. In September 2019, he tabled a motion called "Both Lives Matter", which called for abortion to be restricted.

In October 2021, Mason received cross-party criticism for attending an anti-abortion protest outside the Queen Elizabeth University Hospital in Glasgow, for claiming that abortion services were rarely 'vital' and alleging that some women are 'coerced' into having abortions. In September 2022 it was reported that Mason was disciplined by the SNP for defending the anti-abortion protests and "causing distress and trauma to women in the way he expressed his views on abortion rights"

In May 2022, Mason tweeted that abortion clinics "push abortions without laying out the pros and cons". In June 2022, Mason told a constituent that he was "pretty positive" about the overruling of Roe v. Wade and the end of US-wide abortion rights. In response Scottish Government Minister for Women's Health, Maree Todd MSP wrote, "For the avoidance of doubt: There is nothing positive about the recent US court ruling. Abortion has been legal in Scotland for over 50 years." And Scottish Labour Women’s Health spokesperson, Carol Mochan, said: “It is sickening to see an SNP MSP gloating as millions of women losing access to vital healthcare." Also, in June 2022, Mason described abortion clinics as "conveyor belts".

In March 2023, Mason was accused of 'hijacking' plans for a Scottish baby loss memorial book to further his anti-abortion agenda. He had tabled a motion in parliament welcoming the proposal but called for "more equality for all unborn babies in the future” and compared miscarriage and premature death to abortion. Labour's Monica Lennon said Mr Mason was trying to "undermine abortion rights." Lennon said “Anti-choice campaigners will take every opportunity to undermine abortion rights, and this parliamentary motion from the SNP’s John Mason is the latest example.

In April 2023, Mason was spotted at an SPUC anti-abortion protest in Edinburgh. Lucy Grieve, co-founder of Back Off Scotland said it was “completely inappropriate” that Mason retains the SNP party whip. Mason was interviewed by SPUC at the protest and appeared to admit to having attended another anti-abortion protest in Glasgow "I would have to say I also visited outside the Queen Elizabeth Hospital, I was at the pro-life vigil during the 40 days, and yet again, very quiet, very peaceful. So the idea that we need legislation to restrict demonstrations like this or vigils like this is just absolute nonsense". The legislation Mason was referring to was Gillian Mackay's private members bill to introduce safe access zones around hospitals and clinics providing abortion services.

=== Comments on LGBT issues ===
During the debate on same-sex marriage in Scotland, Mason was widely condemned for raising a motion stating that "while some in society approve of same-sex sexual relationships, others do not agree with them" and that no person or organisation should be forced to be involved or to approve of same-sex marriage. In February 2013, he wrote that he did not believe same-sex couples should have sex, on the grounds that, "the Bible is the word of God and its teachings are God’s direction as to how I should live my life. The Bible’s teaching is that a follower of Jesus should not have a sexual relationship with someone of the same sex.” In 2020 Mason returned to the question of gay sex, informing the Scottish Parliament whilst debating the Hate Crime Bill that the legislation would mean, "[Green party co-leader] Patrick Harvie and I can continue to debate who should or should not have sex with whom... That is a sign of a healthy society and a healthy democracy." The remark was criticised as "utterly bizarre".

In June 2018 Mason responded to an email from a constituent that he did not agree with retrospective pardons for gay men convicted of having consensual sex before decriminalisation. He wrote, "I do not see that we can go round pardoning and apologising for everything that other people did that does not conform to modern customs. Will the Italians be apologising for the Roman occupation?" Mason was criticised for his "flippant tone".

In November 2018 he wrote a letter to The Herald newspaper to complain that transgender people "override science".

In January 2022 Mason referred to trans women as "people whose biological sex is male" and suggested that those convicted of crimes should serve their sentences in male prisons. Mason's remark was denounced as a "very shrill anti-trans dog whistle".

=== Trivialisation of sexual abuse ===
In January 2017, he tweeted in the context of a second independence referendum that "Girls don't always say yes first time", leading to criticism that his comments were sexist and trivialised "rape culture" by Scottish Labour leader Kezia Dugdale, the Scottish Conservatives and the President of NUS Scotland, Vonnie Sandlan. Mason defended his comment as innocent and reflected the fact that "asking a girl for a relationship or to dinner, they don't always say yes the first time."

In May 2018, Mason was criticised for comparing the child sexual abuse by former Celtic Boys Club employees to tax avoidance schemes. Mason defended his comments.

=== Trivialisation of disabilities ===
Also in May 2018, Mason was contacted by a wheelchair user with concerns about the lack of accessibility to Celtic football club's stadium. Mason suggested that the fan support another team, a comment described as "outrageous" by Labour MSP James Kelly.

=== Comments on the IRA ===
In February 2017, The First Minister of Scotland, Nicola Sturgeon apologised to the families of three Scottish IRA murder victims after Mason had claimed members of the terrorist organisation could be considered freedom fighters. Mason apologised for his comments after a meeting with the SNP's Scottish Parliament chief whip Bill Kidd.

=== Actions during COVID-19 pandemic ===
In March 2020, he came under criticism for refusing to follow Scottish Government advice and keeping his parliamentary office open to the public during the COVID-19 pandemic. Fergus Mutch, a former SNP press officer, said of the controversy, "When I ran the SNP press office, I often felt I was defending the indefensible with John Mason. In the past, however, he's only brought the party into disrepute. This time he's risking lives. Typically stubborn and deeply arrogant."

=== Support for Young Earth creationism ===
In January 2015 he spoke in parliament in favour of teaching school children young Earth creationism, claiming that it cannot be "disproved by science".

=== Israel ===
Mason was a member of the cross-party group Building Bridges with Israel. He was one of only three non-Conservative MSP members, alongside his former SNP colleague Fergus Ewing and Labour's Paul O'Kane.

In August 2024, Mason had the SNP whip suspended after claiming that if Israel wanted to commit genocide in the wake of October 7th, it would have killed ten times as many civilians. A spokesperson for the SNP said, "To flippantly dismiss the death of more than 40,000 Palestinians is completely unacceptable. There can be no room in the SNP for this kind of intolerance." On 13 October 2024, it was announced that Mason had been expelled from the SNP. He was given 21 days to appeal, but later stated that he would sit as an independent until the next election before stepping down as an MSP.

=== Other ===
In February 2016, he publicly asked "How is national debt different from national deficit?" on Twitter, prompting The Spectator to say that he "appears to lack a basic understanding of finance".

In June 2017 Mason tweeted that, “learning times tables and spelling [were] stronger in my day but we have moved on”. He also wrote that, “Of course, reading and writing are very important. But if someone is a good surgeon and cannot spell, is that a problem?” and “What level of literacy is needed to have an IT career?” During a session of First Minister's Questions, Scottish Conservative leader Ruth Davidson asked Nicola Sturgeon whether she agreed with Mason; the First Minister declined to endorse his comments.

In May 2020, he came under fire for proposing a motion that the Scottish Parliament should "recognise the sacrifices" the armed forces make, the Parliament should "believe that some people use Armed Forces' Day to celebrate military might and power for the promotion of what considers to be an unhealthy British nationalism". Leading to criticism from opposition parties that it was "deeply disrespectful" to the armed forces. Mason defending his proposed motion stating: "I think my motion is clear in that I fully support the armed forces and am happy that we celebrate them."

In 2021, amid reports of a cleansing and vermin crisis in Glasgow, Labour MSP Pam Duncan-Glancy told Holyrood that there were even rats in her flat. Mason heckled her that, "There are rats in every street."

In October 2022, Mason was criticised by Labour MSP Paul Sweeney for his "insulting" response to a Glasgow-based homeless charity. Homeless Project Scotland had contacted Mason among several politicians looking for support for a safe indoor space to aid them during the winter months, Mason instead criticised the charity’s finances and asked them to "rent a building" instead of seeking assistance from local government, the charity accused Mason of continuing to "blast our charity" and claimed Mason had never responded to requests to visit them.

== Personal life ==
Mason is single, a member of Easterhouse Baptist Church and a Clyde F.C. supporter.

Scottish Parliament
Preceded by Frank McAveety	Member of the Scottish Parliament for Glasgow Shettleston; 2011–2026	Constituency abolished
Parliament of the United Kingdom
Preceded by David Marshall	Member of Parliament for Glasgow East; 2008 – 2010	Succeeded by Margaret Curran
