= Second periodic review of Scottish Parliament boundaries =

Scottish bill

The Second periodic review of Scottish Parliament boundaries was carried out by Boundaries Scotland between 2022 and 2025, beginning on 1 September 2022. Provisional proposals were published on 15 April 2023; following consultations revised proposals were published in April 2024. Further proposals with modifications to the revised proposals were published in September 2024. Final recommendations were published in 1st May 2025. These final proposals were formally approved in October 2025, establishing the new constituencies and regions that will be first contested at the 2026 Scottish Parliament election.

The Scotland Act 1998 as amended by the Scottish Elections (Reform) Act 2020 required the commission to review boundaries of all constituencies except Orkney, Shetland and Na h-Eileanan an Iar) (which cover, respectively, the Orkney Islands council area, the Shetland Islands council area and the Comhairle nan Eilean Siar) so that Scotland would continue to be covered by a total of 73 constituencies. The Orkney, Shetland and Na h-Eileanan an Iar constituencies were taken into account, however, in review of boundaries of the additional member regions.

The review should have taken place within 12 years of the first periodic review of Scottish Parliament boundaries; however, by the time of the 2021 Scottish Parliament election this had not taken place. A meeting of the Boundary Commission in 2017 indicated that an extension would be sought by the Scottish Government to have the constituencies reviewed by the time of the next proposed election.

== Details ==
=== Provisional proposals ===
In the provisional proposals,

- 27 remain completely unchanged, keeping both their name and borders, including the protected constituencies
- Two remain unchanged geographically but have new names (Fife North East and Airdrie, to distinguish from the Westminster constituencies of North East Fife and Airdrie and Shotts)
- 23 have newly drawn boundaries but the name has been retained
- 21 completely new constituencies are proposed, with new names and boundaries

=== Revised proposals ===
The revised proposals made changes to 30 seats had new boundaries and new names and 18 had minor changes to boundaries but retained their original names from the initial review.

=== Further proposals ===
In the further proposals to constituencies and revised proposals to constituencies,

- the Mid Scotland and Fife region remains unchanged
- the South Scotland region would now include Hamilton, and loses Stewarton in Ayrshire and the newly formed East Lothian Coast and Lammermuirs
- the Lothian region would now include East Lothian Coast and Lammermuirs
- the West Scotland region would lose Renfrew, Erskine and Bishopton

After several responses opposing the omission of Leith, including a petition with over 750 names, the constituency which would have been called Edinburgh North Eastern would now be called Edinburgh North Eastern and Leith.

== Constituency proposals ==
The review had the following proposals:

=== Final recommendations (2025) ===
Region	Constituencies	map
Central Scotland and Lothians West (2022 electorate: 550,717)	Airdrie; Almond Valley; Bathgate; Coatbridge and Chryston; Cumbernauld and Kilsyth; Falkirk East and Linlithgow; Falkirk West; Motherwell and Wishaw; Uddingston and Bellshill	
Edinburgh and Lothians East (2022 electorate: 543,001)	East Lothian Coast and Lammermuirs; Edinburgh Central; Edinburgh Eastern, Musselburgh and Tranent; Edinburgh North Eastern and Leith; Edinburgh North Western; Edinburgh Northern; Edinburgh South Western; Edinburgh Southern; Midlothian North	
Glasgow (2022 electorate: 500,456)	Glasgow Anniesland; Glasgow Baillieston and Shettleston; Glasgow Cathcart and Pollok; Glasgow Central; Glasgow Easterhouse and Springburn; Glasgow Kelvin and Maryhill; Glasgow Southside; Rutherglen and Cambuslang	
Highlands and Islands (2022 electorate: 359,306)	Argyll and Bute; Caithness, Sutherland and Ross; Inverness and Nairn; Moray; Na h-Eileanan an Iar; Orkney Islands; Shetland Islands; Skye, Lochaber and Badenoch	
Mid Scotland and Fife (2022 electorate: 521,460)	Clackmannanshire and Dunblane; Cowdenbeath; Dunfermline; Fife North East; Kirkcaldy; Mid Fife and Glenrothes; Perthshire North; Perthshire South and Kinross-shire; Stirling	
North East Scotland (2022 electorate: 589,084)	Aberdeen Central; Aberdeen Deeside and North Kincardine; Aberdeen Donside; Aberdeenshire East; Aberdeenshire West; Angus North and Mearns; Angus South; Banffshire and Buchan Coast; Dundee City East; Dundee City West	
South Scotland (2022 electorate: 594,925)	Ayr; Carrick, Cumnock and Doon Valley; Clydesdale; Dumfriesshire; East Kilbride; Ettrick, Roxburgh and Berwickshire; Galloway and West Dumfries; Hamilton, Larkhall and Stonehouse; Kilmarnock and Irvine Valley; Midlothian South, Tweeddale and Lauderdale	
West Scotland (2022 electorate: 591,614)	Clydebank and Milngavie; Cunninghame North; Cunninghame South; Dumbarton; Eastwood; Inverclyde; Paisley; Renfrewshire North and Cardonald; Renfrewshire West and Levern Valley; Strathkelvin and Bearsden	

=== Revised Proposals (2024) ===
Aberdeen Central | Aberdeen Donside | Aberdeen South and North Kincardine | Aberdeenshire East | Aberdeenshire West | Airdrie | Angus North and Mearns | Angus South | Argyll and Bute | Ayr | Banffshire and Buchan Coast | Bathgate | Caithness, Sutherland and Ross | Carrick, Cumnock and Doon Valley | Clackmannanshire and Dunblane | Clydebank and Milngavie | Clydesdale | Coatbridge and Chryston | Cowdenbeath | Cumbernauld and Kilsyth | Cunninghame North | Cunninghame South | Dumbarton | Dumfriesshire | Dundee City East | Dundee City West | Dunfermline | East Kilbride | Eastwood | Edinburgh Central | Edinburgh Eastern, Musselburgh and Tranent | Edinburgh North Eastern | Edinburgh North Western | Edinburgh Northern | Edinburgh South Western | Edinburgh Southern | Erskine and Cardonald | Ettrick, Roxburgh and Berwickshire | Falkirk North | Fife North East | Galloway and West Dumfries | Glasgow Central | Glasgow Eastern | Glasgow North Eastern | Glasgow Northern | Glasgow South Eastern | Glasgow Southern | Glasgow Western | Hamilton, Larkhall and Stonehouse | Inverclyde | Inverness and Nairn | Kilmarnock and Irvine Valley | Kirkcaldy | Linlithgow and Falkirk South | Livingston and Breich Valley | Lothian Eastern | Mid Fife and Glenrothes | Midlothian North | Midlothian South, Tweeddale and Lauderdale | Moray | Motherwell and Wishaw | Paisley | Perthshire North | Perthshire South and Kinross-shire | Renfrewshire West | Rutherglen | Skye, Lochaber and Badenoch | Stirling | Strathkelvin and Bearsden | Uddingston and Bellshill

=== Initial Proposals (2023) ===
Aberdeen Donside | Aberdeen South and North Kincardine | Aberdeenshire East | Aberdeenshire West | Airdrie, Newmains and Shotts | Angus North and Mearns | Angus South | Argyll and Bute | Ayr | Banff and Buchan Coast | Bathgate and Almond Valley | Bearsden, Milngavie and Clydebank North | Bellshill and Coatbridge | Caithness, Sutherland and Ross | Carrick, Cumnock and Doon Valley | Clackmannanshire and Dunblane | Clyde Valley and Tweeddale | Cowdenbeath | Cumbernauld and Chryston | Cunninghame North | Cunninghame South | Dumbarton and Helensburgh | Dumfriesshire | Dundee City East | Dundee City West | Dunfermline | East Kilbride | East Lothian | Edinburgh Central | Edinburgh Eastern | Edinburgh Forth and Linlithgow | Edinburgh Northern and Leith | Edinburgh Pentlands | Edinburgh Southern | Edinburgh Western | Ettrick, Roxburgh and Berwickshire | Falkirk East | Falkirk West | Fife North East | Galloway and West Dumfries | Glasgow Anniesland | Glasgow Cardonald and Pollok | Glasgow Central and Govan | Glasgow Kelvin and Maryhill | Glasgow Priesthill and Giffnock | Glasgow Shettleston and Baillieston | Glasgow Southside and Cathcart | Glasgow Springburn and Provan | Hamilton and Uddingston | Inverclyde | Inverness and Nairn | Kilmarnock and Irvine Valley | Kirkcaldy | Kirkintilloch and Kilsyth | Larkhall and Clydesdale | Livingston | Mid Fife and Glenrothes | Midlothian North and Musselburgh | Midlothian South | Moray | Motherwell | Paisley and Renfrew | Perthshire North | Perthshire South and Kinross-shire | Renfrewshire South | Renfrewshire West | Rutherglen | Skye, Lochaber and Badenoch | Stirling
