= Natalie McGarry =

Scottish politician

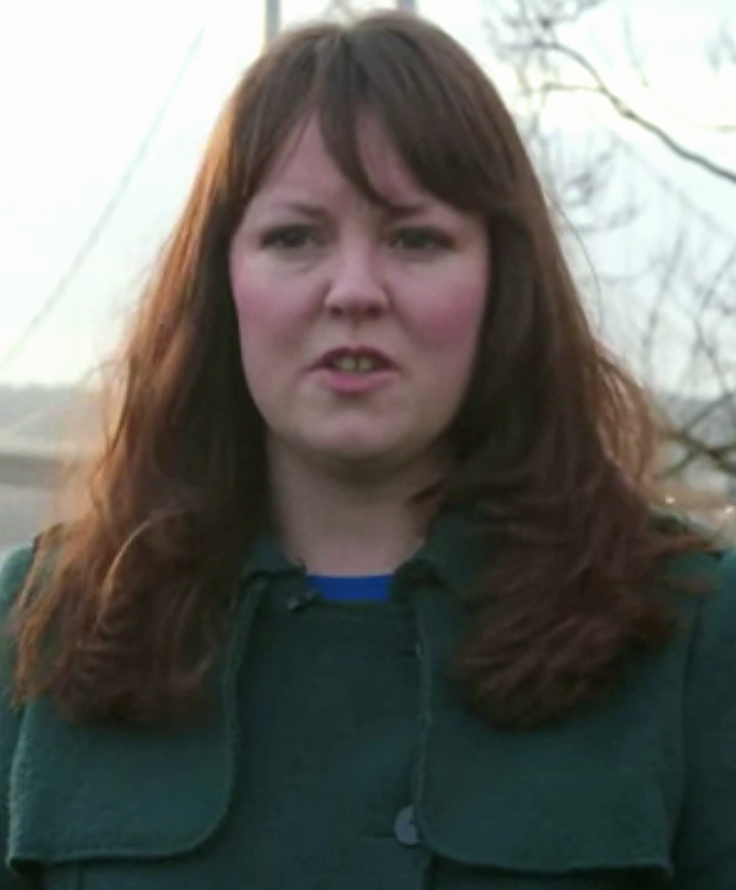
- McGarry in 2014

Member of Parliament for Glasgow East
- In office 8 May 2015 – 3 May 2017
- Preceded by: Margaret Curran
- Succeeded by: David Linden

Personal details
- Born: 7 September 1981 (age 45) Inverkeithing, Fife, Scotland
- Party: Independent (since 2015)
- Other political affiliations: Scottish National Party (until 2015)
- Spouse: David Meikle
- Children: 1
- Relatives: Tricia Marwick (aunt)
- Education: University of Aberdeen
- Website: Official website (archived)

Natalie McGarry (born 7 September 1981) is a Scottish former politician who served as the Member of Parliament (MP) for Glasgow East from 2015 to 2017. She was elected as a Scottish National Party (SNP) candidate in the 2015 general election but resigned the SNP whip after six months and sat as an independent until the end of the parliamentary session in May 2017. Prior to her election, McGarry was a SNP activist and convener of the party's Glasgow Regional Association. She was a co-founder of the Women for Independence group.

Following a long and complex legal process that began in 2015, in May 2022 McGarry was found guilty of embezzling funds totalling £24,635 from Women For Independence and the Glasgow Regional Association of the SNP. She was subsequently sentenced to twenty months imprisonment.

== Early life and education ==
Born and raised in Inverkeithing in Fife, McGarry was educated at St. Columba's R.C. High School, Dunfermline, before studying law at the University of Aberdeen, and worked as a policy adviser for a voluntary sector organisation.

== Political career ==
At the SNP's annual conference in 2012, McGarry argued on the anti-NATO side of the NATO debate in the Scottish National Party, stating that opposition "is not merely about nuclear weapons" and calling for the SNP to retain its opposition to NATO membership.

McGarry was one of the founder women activists who set up Women for Independence in 2012. She told the Glasgow Herald the group was created "over a glass of wine" with former SSP MSP Carolyn Leckie as its main driving force. Explaining the decision, she said: "We came together because a group of us arrived at the conclusion, individually, that women's voices were missing from both sides of the referendum debate."

McGarry was selected as the party's candidate for the 2014 Cowdenbeath by-election after previously failing to be selected as an SNP candidate in the 2014 European Parliament election. McGarry failed to win the by-election, gaining 5,704 votes (28.4%).

McGarry was elected as MP for the Glasgow East constituency at the 2015 General Election held on 8 May 2015, taking the seat from former Labour MP Margaret Curran which was part of a historic election result that saw the SNP win 56 out of Scotland's 59 seats at Westminster.

In January 2016, McGarry and author J. K. Rowling were involved in a Twitter row. McGarry accused the author of supporting an anonymous Twitter user with "misogynistic views". Rowling asked for an apology from McGarry and threatened legal action if it was not forthcoming. McGarry deleted the offending tweets and apologised to Rowling. In March, McGarry also claimed on Twitter that the organisation Scotland in Union was "headed by an internet troll and an outed holocaust denier". This was not true, McGarry having confused Scotland in Union's head with the similarly named Alastair McConnachie. McGarry later deleted her tweet and tweeted an apology. McGarry later made a formal apology and agreed to pay £10,000 in damages in an out-of-court settlement.

In February 2016, McGarry was detained for questioning by Turkish security forces after she used her mobile phone near a security checkpoint in south-eastern Turkey. She stated she was "recording the sound of bombs" falling on a nearby Kurdish area.

As she was still suspended from the party, she was not selected as the SNP candidate for her seat at the 2017 Westminster general election.

== Embezzlement convictions ==
In September 2015, Women for Independence alerted police after noticing discrepancies in its accounts, prompting an investigation into campaign funds, which was publicly reported for the first time in November 2015. It was alleged that McGarry, in her role as treasurer, transferred money raised during campaign events into her personal account and used cheques made out to the campaign to deposit money into her own account, embezzling a total of £32,991. She denied all wrongdoing. On 24 November, after the allegations surfaced, it was announced that McGarry had resigned the SNP whip and was automatically suspended from the party. She continued to sit as an independent MP.

In September 2016, McGarry gave a voluntary interview with Police Scotland. Following this interview, McGarry was charged with a number of fraud offences, including embezzlement of funds, breach of trust and an offence under the Scottish Independence Referendum Act 2013. It was alleged that between April 2014 and August 2015 she embezzled a total of £4,661 in her role as treasurer of the Scottish National Party's Glasgow Regional Association, and that between February 2014 and June the same year she embezzled £3,891 from funds raised for the Yes Glasgow campaign group. She was initially represented by solicitor Aamer Anwar, but subsequently changed representation.

McGarry appeared in private at Glasgow Sheriff Court on 21 March 2018. On 21 February 2019, she entered a plea of not guilty to three charges of embezzlement and one charge under the Regulation of Investigatory Powers Act 2000 in relation to failing to provide police with a passcode to a mobile phone seized from her. Her trial began at the court on 23 April. The following day, she pleaded guilty to two charges of embezzlement including £21,000 from Women for Independence and £4,661 from SNP Glasgow regional association. The remaining charges were dropped. She was to be sentenced in May and the Crown intended to recover the money through the Proceeds of Crime Act 2002.

On 1 May she attempted to withdraw her two guilty pleas, but the sheriff ruled that this was not possible, and on 6 June she was jailed for eighteen months. Several days later she was released on bail pending an appeal. On 19 December her conviction was quashed pending a retrial, following submissions by her lawyer Gordon Jackson.

Her retrial for embezzling money from two Scottish independence organisations, Perth and Kinross food bank and a charity that campaigns on behalf of people who have been through the justice system, commenced on 6 April 2022 in Glasgow Sheriff Court. On 12 May she was found guilty of embezzling £25,000. Sentencing was deferred.

On 30 June 2022, McGarry was sentenced to two years' imprisonment. On 23 February 2023, she appealed against conviction and sentence; the three-judge panel rejected her appeal against conviction, but held that the Sheriff had applied an excessive prison sentence and reduced the two-year sentence to twenty months. Prosecutors attempting to recover funds were told that none were available at a hearing on 7 March 2023. In September of the same year, a confiscation order was issued against McGarry. She was ordered to pay £66.36, the "only amount available".

== Personal life ==
In May 2016, McGarry married David Meikle, a Conservative councillor on Glasgow City Council representing the Pollokshields ward. The couple had been together since 2011, and announced their engagement shortly after she was elected as an MP. They lived in Shawlands, Glasgow until they moved to Clarkston some time after the birth of their daughter.

McGarry's mother, Alice McGarry, was the SNP parliamentary candidate for Dunfermline East in 1987 and became a long-standing SNP councillor on Fife Council in 1986, representing Inverkeithing and Dalgety Bay. Her aunt is Tricia Marwick, former Presiding Officer of the Scottish Parliament and SNP MSP.

On 19 April 2017, McGarry fainted in the House of Commons while pregnant, and gave birth to a daughter later that year.

Parliament of the United Kingdom
Preceded by Margaret Curran	Member of Parliament for Glasgow East; 2015–2017	Succeeded by David Linden
