= Glasgow East =

UK Parliament constituency (since 2005)

Coordinates: 55°51′20″N 4°08′49″W

- Burgh constituency for the House of Commons
- Interactive map of boundaries from 2024
- Location within Scotland
- Subdivision: Glasgow City
- Electorate: 69,748 (March 2020)
- Major settlements: Baillieston, Carmyle, Garrowhill, Shettleston

Current constituency
- Created: 2005
- Member of Parliament: John Grady (Labour)
- Created from: Glasgow Baillieston; Glasgow Shettleston

Glasgow East is a constituency of the House of Commons of the UK Parliament, located in the city of Glasgow, Scotland. It elects one Member of Parliament at least once every five years using the first-past-the-post system of voting. It is currently represented by John Grady of the Labour Party who has been the MP since 2024.

== History ==
Prior to the 2005 general election, the city area was covered by ten constituencies, of which two straddled boundaries with other council areas. The Glasgow East constituency includes the area of the former Glasgow Baillieston constituency and parts of the former Glasgow Shettleston constituency. Scottish Parliament constituencies retain the names and boundaries of the older Westminster constituencies.

It was once one of the safest seats for the Labour Party, the areas included in the constituency having returned solely Labour MPs since the 1930s. Glasgow Baillieston had always been represented by MPs from the Labour Party, as was the predecessor Glasgow Provan constituency from its creation in 1955. Glasgow Shettleston was won by the Labour Party at every general election from 1950 onwards (in 1945 it was won by the Independent Labour Party).

However, it achieved national prominence when a by-election in 2008 saw the Scottish National Party overturn a majority of over 13,000 votes to gain the seat (see below). Since then, it has been tightly fought by Labour and the SNP.

At the 2010 general election, the seat was regained for Labour by Margaret Curran from John Mason of the SNP with a large majority of more than 11,000 votes.

During the 2015 general election there was a nationwide surge of support for the SNP, as pro-independence voters rallied to support the party in unprecedented numbers. After votes were counted The Guardian reported: "The SNP swept aside once-unassailable majorities for Labour with swings as high as 35%, as voters threw out Jim Murphy, the Scottish Labour leader, its former deputy leader, Anas Sarwar, and Margaret Curran, the shadow Scottish secretary [in Glasgow East]."

At the 2016 EU referendum, the House of Commons Library estimates that 53% of local voters opted for Britain to Remain a member of the EU, while 47% voted to leave.

The 2017 general election result in the constituency was that election's tenth-closest result, with David Linden of the SNP holding the seat by a margin of 75 votes. Amid a nationwide backlash against Nicola Sturgeon's plans for a second independence referendum, the SNP's share of the vote dropped by 18%, the Conservative vote nearly trebled and Labour picked up votes from left-wing voters excited by Jeremy Corbyn and the British Labour Party's socialist platform.

In 2019, Linden was re-elected with an increased majority of 5,566 votes, making the seat a comfortable SNP majority. However, at the 2024 general election, the SNP's vote slumped once again and Linden was defeated by Labour's John Grady with a majority of 3,784 on a notional swing of 13%.

=== 2008 by-election ===
On 28 June 2008, the sitting MP David Marshall announced he would step down because of a stress-related illness; he was appointed Steward of the Manor of Northstead on 30 June 2008, thus effectively resigning from the House of Commons. Although the seat represented Labour's third-largest majority in Scotland, it faced a strong challenge from the Scottish National Party, hot on the heels of Labour's disastrous performance at the 2008 Henley by-election. Nominations for candidates closed at 4pm on 9 July, and the election took place on 24 July.

On 25 July 2008, and after a recount, the SNP candidate John Mason won the seat with a narrow majority of 365 votes over the Labour Party candidate, Margaret Curran.

== Boundaries ==
Map of boundaries 2005–2024

=== 2005–2024 ===
Under the Fifth Review of UK Parliament constituencies which came into effect for the 2005 general election, the boundaries were defined in accordance with the ward structure in place on 30 November 2004 as containing the Glasgow City Council wards of Parkhead, Queenslie, Greenfield, Barlanark, Shettleston, Tollcross Park, Braidfauld, Mount Vernon, Baillieston, Garrowhill, Garthamlock and Easterhouse. Further to reviews of local government ward boundaries which came into effect in 2007 and 2017, but did not affect the parliamentary boundaries, the constituency comprised the City of Glasgow Council wards or part wards of: Calton (minority), East Centre (majority), Shettleston, Baillieston and North East (majority).

=== 2024–present ===
Map of boundaries from 2024

Further to the 2023 review of Westminster constituencies, which came into effect for the 2024 general election the constituency boundaries were significantly re-drawn, to take in a large part of the abolished constituency of Glasgow Central, including the districts of Merchant City, Calton, Bridgeton and Dalmarnock, as well as areas to the south of the River Clyde such as Gorbals, Govanhill and Hutchesontown. To compensate, areas to the north of the main east-west railway, including the districts of Queenslie, Greenfield, Barlanark, Garthamlock and Easterhouse were transferred to Glasgow North East.

The constituency currently consists of the following wards or part wards of the City of Glasgow:

- The bulk of Southside Central ward - excluding a small area to the north of Queen's Park;
- the bulk of Calton ward - except a small strip between the main east-west railway and Duke Street;
- a small part of Anderston/City/Yorkhill ward comprising the Merchant City area;
- the whole of Shettleston ward; and
- the bulk of Baillieston ward - except the area between the main east-west railway and the M8 (Queenslie).

== Constituency profile ==
Glasgow East is one of six constituencies covering the Glasgow City Council area taking in the areas of: Baillieston, Carmyle, Parkhead, Shettleston and Tollcross. It formerly included Easterhouse and Gartloch. Further to the 2023 boundary review, it also includes the areas of: Calton, Bridgeton, Dalmarnock, Gorbals, Govanhill and Hutchesontown.

The constituency is one of the most deprived constituencies in the UK. In 2008, nearly 40% of adults smoke (UK average at the time was 19.2%), and on average there were 25 drug-related deaths a year. Average male life expectancy is 68, five years less than the Scottish average, while in the Shettleston area it is 63. A 2008 World Health Organization report gave the average male life expectancy in Calton as 54, which is lower than it was before the Second World War.

== Members of Parliament ==
Election	Member	Party
2005	David Marshall	Labour
2008 by-election	John Mason	SNP
2010	Margaret Curran	Labour
2015	Natalie McGarry	SNP
2015	Natalie McGarry	Independent
2017	David Linden	SNP
2024	John Grady	Labour

== Elections ==
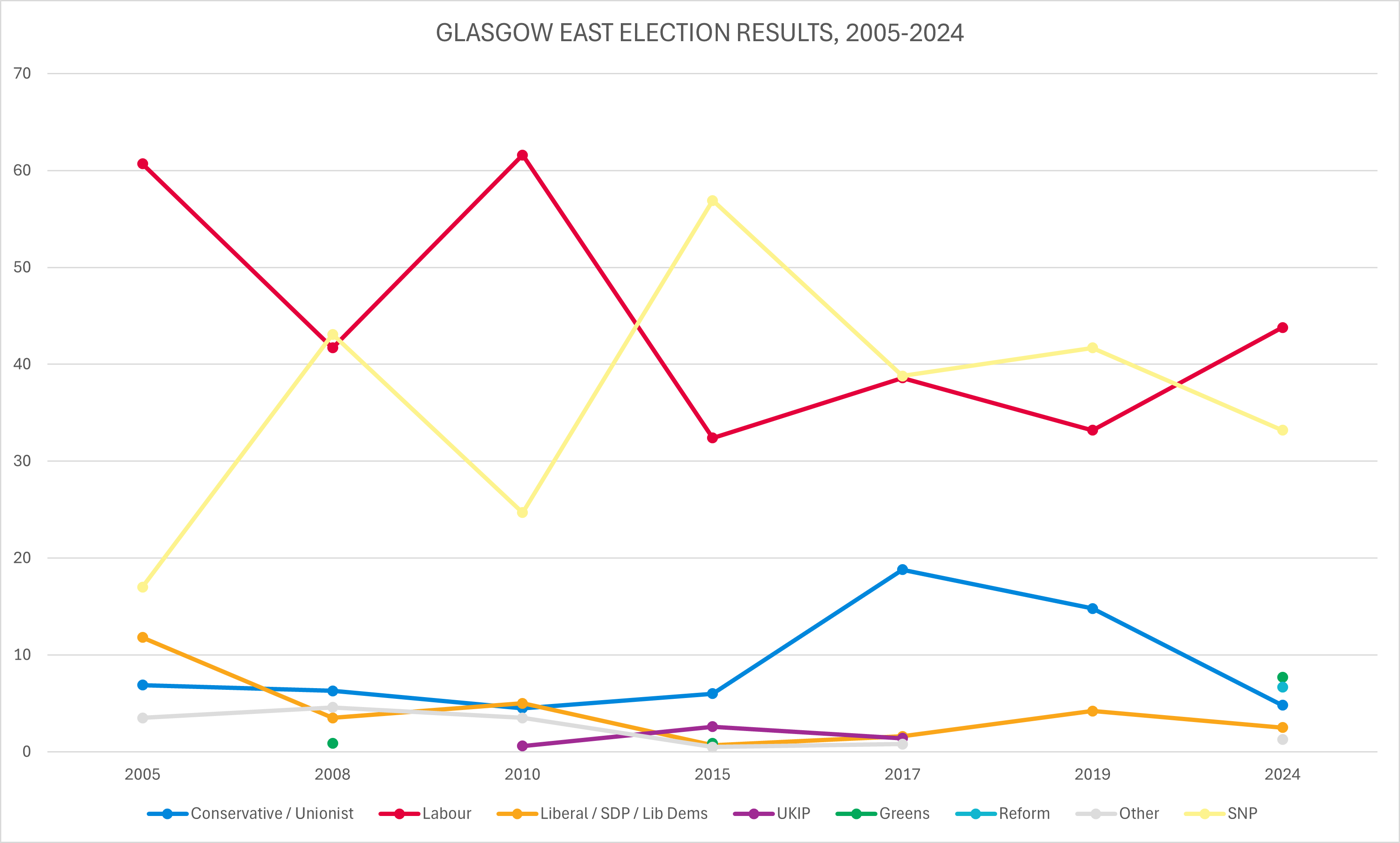
Election results 2005-2024

=== Elections in the 2020s ===
General election 2024: Glasgow East
Party	Candidate	Votes	%	±%
Labour	John Grady	15,543	43.8	+10.4
SNP	David Linden	11,759	33.2	−15.5
Green	Amy Kettyles	2,727	7.7	+6.3
Reform	Donnie McLeod	2,371	6.7	+6.6
Conservative	Thomas Kerr	1,707	4.8	−7.5
Liberal Democrats	Matthew Clark	872	2.5	−1.6
Scottish Socialist	Liam McLaughlan	466	1.3	New
Majority		3,784	10.6	N/A
Turnout		35,445	51.4	−7.6
Registered electors		68,988		
Labour gain from SNP		Swing	+13.0	

=== Elections in the 2010s ===
2019 notional result (Note: Estimate of the 2019 general election result as if the revised boundaries recommended under the 2023 boundary review were in place)
Party	Vote	%
SNP	20,055	48.7
Labour	13,779	33.5
Conservative	5,071	12.3
Liberal Democrats	1,689	4.1
Scottish Greens	566	1.4
Brexit Party	25	0.1
Majority	6,276	15.2
Turnout	41,185	59.0
Electorate	69,748	

General election 2019: Glasgow East
Party	Candidate	Votes	%	±%
SNP	David Linden	18,357	47.7	+8.9
Labour	Kate Watson	12,791	33.2	−5.4
Conservative	Thomas Kerr	5,709	14.8	−4.0
Liberal Democrats	James Harrison	1,626	4.2	+2.6
Majority		5,566	14.5	+14.3
Turnout		38,483	57.1	+2.5
SNP hold		Swing	+7.1	

General election 2017: Glasgow East
Party	Candidate	Votes	%	±%
SNP	David Linden	14,024	38.8	−18.1
Labour	Kate Watson	13,949	38.6	+6.2
Conservative	Thomas Kerr	6,816	18.8	+12.8
Liberal Democrats	Matthew Clark	567	1.6	+0.9
UKIP	John Ferguson	502	1.4	−1.2
Independent	Karin Finegan	158	0.4	New
SDP	Steven Marshall	148	0.4	New
Majority		75	0.2	−24.3
Turnout		36,175	54.6	−5.7
SNP hold		Swing	−12.2	

General election 2015: Glasgow East
Party	Candidate	Votes	%	±%
SNP	Natalie McGarry	24,116	56.9	+32.2
Labour	Margaret Curran	13,729	32.4	−29.2
Conservative	Andrew Morrison	2,544	6.0	+1.5
UKIP	Arthur Thackeray	1,105	2.6	+2.0
Green	Kim Long	381	0.9	New
Liberal Democrats	Gary McLelland	318	0.7	−4.3
Scottish Socialist	Liam McLaughlan	224	0.5	−0.9
Majority		10,387	24.5	N/A
Turnout		42,417	60.3	+8.3
SNP gain from Labour		Swing	+30.7	

General election 2010: Glasgow East
Party	Candidate	Votes	%	±%
Labour	Margaret Curran	19,797	61.6	+0.9
SNP	John Mason	7,957	24.7	+7.7
Liberal Democrats	Kevin Ward	1,617	5.0	−6.8
Conservative	Hamira Khan	1,453	4.5	−2.4
BNP	Joe T Finnie	677	2.1	New
Scottish Socialist	Frances Curran	454	1.4	−2.1
UKIP	Arthur Thackeray	209	0.6	New
Majority		11,840	36.9	−6.8
Turnout		32,164	52.0	+3.8
Labour hold		Swing	+18.5	

=== Elections in the 2000s ===
2008 Glasgow East by-election
Party	Candidate	Votes	%	±%
SNP	John Mason	11,277	43.1	+26.1
Labour	Margaret Curran	10,912	41.7	−19.0
Conservative	Davena Rankin	1,639	6.3	−0.6
Liberal Democrats	Ian Robertson	915	3.5	−8.3
Scottish Socialist	Frances Curran	555	2.1	−1.4
Solidarity	Tricia McLeish	512	2.0	New
Green	Eileen Duke	232	0.9	New
Independent	Chris Creighton	67	0.3	New
Freedom-4-Choice	Hamish Howitt	65	0.2	New
Majority		365	1.4	N/A
Turnout		26,219	42.25	−5.95
SNP gain from Labour		Swing	+22.5	

General election 2005: Glasgow East
Party	Candidate	Votes	%	±%
Labour	David Marshall	18,775	60.7	−3.0
SNP	Lachlan McNeill	5,268	17.0	−0.1
Liberal Democrats	David Jackson	3,665	11.8	+6.0
Conservative	Carl Thomson	2,135	6.9	+0.8
Scottish Socialist	George Savage	1,096	3.5	−3.4
Majority		13,507	43.7	−2.9
Turnout		30,939	48.2	
Labour win (new seat)				

== See also ==
- Politics of Glasgow
