= David Marshall (British politician) =

British politician

Member of Parliament for Glasgow East Glasgow Shettleston (1979–2005)
- In office 3 May 1979 – 30 June 2008
- Preceded by: Myer Galpern
- Succeeded by: John Mason

Personal details
- Born: 7 May 1941 (age 84) Glasgow, Scotland
- Party: Labour

David Marshall (born 7 May 1941) is a British Labour politician who served as the Member of Parliament (MP) for Glasgow Shettleston from 1979 to 2005, then for Glasgow East from 2005 to 2008.

Marshall was educated variously at the Larbert High School, Denny High School, Woodside Senior Secondary School and Falkirk High School.

Marshall has been a member of the Transport and General Workers' Union since 1960 and a member of the Labour Party since 1962. He worked in Glasgow as a Labour Party organiser from 1969, before becoming a full-time councillor. He was for three years, from 1972 a member of Glasgow City Council, and a member of Strathclyde Regional Council from 1974 until his election to Parliament.

He was elected as a Labour MP at the 1979 general election for Glasgow Shettleston following the retirement of Myer Galpern. He represented that constituency from then until the 2005 election, at which point he was elected from Glasgow East. He did not reach the front bench in his long parliamentary career, but served on many select committees, including chairing both the Transport (1987–1992) and Scotland committees (1992–1997). He was latterly a member of the Chairman's Panel.

On 27 June 2008 it was reported that he would stand down due to ill health. These reports have also linked his ill health with stress brought on by predictions that his parliamentary expenses were to be investigated. On 30 June he was appointed Steward and Bailiff of the Manor of Northstead, confirming his resignation.

He is married with a son and a daughter.

Parliament of the United Kingdom
Preceded by Myer Galpern	Member of Parliament for Glasgow Shettleston; 1979 – 2005	Constituency abolished
New constituency	Member of Parliament for Glasgow East; 2005 – 2008	Succeeded by John Mason
