= Back Off Scotland =

Scottish anti-harassment campaign group

- Formation: 2020
- Founder: Lucy Grieve, Alice Murray
- Founded at: Edinburgh
- Volunteers: 60+
- Website: https://www.backoffscotland.com/
- Formerly called: Back Off Chalmers

Back Off Scotland is a campaign group advocating against the intimidation and harassment of women attending sexual health clinics in Scotland. After petitioning the Scottish Government for the establishment of 150-metre buffer zones around clinics that provide abortion services nationwide, the Safe Access Zones (Scotland) Bill was passed in June 2024.

== Formation ==
The campaign, originally entitled Back Off Chalmers with reference to Chalmers Sexual Health Clinic in Edinburgh, was co-founded by University of Edinburgh students Lucy Grieve and Alice Murray. The campaign to introduce 100m buffer zones around the clinic was started in October 2020 after an increase of the number of anti-abortion protestors from 40 Days for Life around the clinic. The campaigners claimed the protestors infringed on patients' rights to anonymity and health care.

After launching a petition in Edinburgh on 9 November 2020, the group created a similar campaign in Glasgow and across Scotland. Following this, the campaign was renamed to Back Off Scotland.

== Response ==
After a petition amassing 4,800 signatures was delivered, the Edinburgh City Council debated the issues and delivered their response in February 2021. The council agreed that while they do not have the authority to implement the buffer zones themselves, they will back the movement and work with the Convention of Scottish Local Authorities in order to support the campaign on a national scale.

Glasgow City Council wrote that they didn't believe they had the power to create buffer zones, and that this must be taken to the Scottish Government. Following the council's decision, a nationwide petition was launched via change.org to petition the Scottish Government to create new legislation.

In the 2021 Scottish Parliament Elections, the Scottish National Party, the Scottish Labour Party, and Scottish Liberal Democrats included the introduction of 'Safe Zones' around abortion clinics in their election manifesto.

In May 2022, Scottish Greens MSP Gillian Mackay launched the consultation process for the Safe Access Zones (Scotland) Bill. The consultation received over 12,000 responses.

In June 2022, Back Off Scotland requested First Minister Nicola Sturgeon to hold an emergency abortion summit in the wake of the United States Supreme Court decision Dobbs v. Jackson and an increase in protests in Scotland. The summit was held on the 27 June 2022 and attended by founders Grieve and Murray. During the summit, the Scottish Government announced their intentions to support the Back Off Scotland campaign and introduce buffer zone legislation. During the campaign, Grieve and Murray were critical of the Scottish Government's inaction over buffer zone legislation and voiced concerns that the Government were backtracking on their commitment to a national 'blanket' approach.

In July 2022 the group held musical events in Glasgow and Edinburgh to raise funds for their campaign. In November of the same year, the campaign, along with Mackay, won the Herald award for Public Campaign of the Year at the newspaper's Scottish Politicians of the Year Awards.

In February 2023, Back Off Scotland spoke at the second Scottish Abortion summit.

Mackay launched the Safe Access Zones (Scotland) Bill in the Scottish Parliament in October 2023. The Bill passed Stage 1 in April 2024 and Stage 2 in May. It was passed at Stage 3 in June 2024, and became an Act in July. As of September 2024, clinics offering abortion services nationwide are subject to 200m buffer zones.
