= Glasgow Shettleston (Scottish Parliament constituency) =

Region or constituency of the Scottish Parliament

- Former burgh constituency for the Scottish Parliament

- Glasgow Shettleston shown within the Glasgow electoral region and the region shown within Scotland
- Population: 79,969 (2019)

Former constituency
- Created: 1999
- Abolished: 2026
- Council area: Glasgow City
- Replaced by: Glasgow Baillieston and Shettleston, Glasgow Central

Glasgow Shettleston was a constituency of the Scottish Parliament, being one of eight constituencies within the Glasgow City council area. Under the additional-member system used for elections to the Scottish Parliament, the seat elected one Member of the Scottish Parliament (MSP) by the plurality (first past the post) method of election, and was also one of nine constituencies in the Glasgow electoral region, which elected seven additional members, in addition to the nine constituency MSPs, to produce a form of proportional representation for the region as a whole.

At the time of its abolition, the seat had been held by John Mason since the 2011 Scottish Parliament election. Mason had originally been elected for the Scottish National Party, but party whip was withdrawn from him in 2024.

As a result of the second periodic review of Scottish Parliament boundaries in 2025, the constituency was abolished ahead of the 2026 Scottish Parliament election. The area covered by Glasgow Shettleston has been divided between the new constituencies of Glasgow Baillieston and Shettleston and Glasgow Central.

== Electoral region ==
During the period Glasgow Shettleston was in existence, the other eight constituencies of the Glasgow region were: Glasgow Anniesland, Glasgow Cathcart, Glasgow Kelvin, Glasgow Maryhill and Springburn, Glasgow Pollok, Glasgow Provan, Glasgow Southside and Rutherglen.

In this period the region covered the Glasgow City council area and a north-western portion of the South Lanarkshire council area.

== Constituency boundaries ==
Map of boundaries from 2011

The Glasgow Shettleston constituency was created at the same time as the Scottish Parliament, ahead of the 1999 Scottish Parliament election, using the name and boundaries of the existing Glasgow Shettleston constituency of the UK Parliament. Ahead of the 2005 United Kingdom general election, boundaries for the UK House of Commons constituencies were revised, whilst the same boundaries were retained for use in elections to the Scottish Parliament. There is now no longer any link between the two sets of boundaries.

The boundaries of the seat were altered by the first periodic review of Scottish Parliament boundaries; the first election under these new boundaries was the 2011 Scottish Parliament election. The following electoral wards of Glasgow City Council were used to define Glasgow Shettleston at this review:

- In full: Calton, Shettleston
- In part: Baillieston (shared with Glasgow Provan)

== Member of the Scottish Parliament ==
Election	Member	Party
1999	Frank McAveety	Labour
2011	John Mason	SNP
2024	John Mason	Independent

== Election results ==
=== 2020s ===
2021 Scottish Parliament election: Glasgow Shettleston
Party	Candidate	Constituency			Regional		
Party	Candidate	Votes	%	±%	Votes	%	±%
SNP	John Mason (Note: Incumbent member for this constituency)	17,465	54.4	▼1.6	14,772	45.8	▼1.9
Labour	Pauline McNeill (Note: Incumbent member on the party list, or for another constituency)	9,440	29.4	▲2.3	7,924	24.6	0.0
Conservative	Thomas Kerr	4,421	13.8	▲1.4	4,821	15.0	▲2.8
Green					2,457	7.6	▲2.0
Liberal Democrats	Matthew Clark	774	2.4	▲0.2	433	1.3	▼0.2
Alba					404	1.3	New
All for Unity					400	1.2	New
Independent Green Voice					225	0.7	New
Scottish Family					166	0.5	New
Freedom Alliance (UK)					105	0.3	New
Abolish the Scottish Parliament					100	0.3	New
Women's Equality					78	0.2	▼0.4
Scottish Libertarian					64	0.2	New
UKIP					62	0.2	▼2.6
TUSC					56	0.2	New
Reform					55	0.2	New
Communist					42	0.1	New
Independent	Craig Ross				21	0.1	New
Reclaim					15	0.0	New
SDP					15	0.0	New
Renew					12	0.0	New
Independent	Daniel Donaldson				6	0.0	New
Majority		8,025	25.0	▼3.9			
Valid votes		32,100			32,233		
Invalid votes		238			119		
Turnout		32,338	53.7	▲9.7	32,352	53.7	▲9.7
SNP hold		Swing					

=== 2010s ===
2016 Scottish Parliament election: Glasgow Shettleston
Party	Candidate	Constituency			Regional		
Party	Candidate	Votes	%	±%	Votes	%	±%
SNP	John Mason (Note: Incumbent member for this constituency)	14,198	56.0	▲8.2	12,160	47.7	▲6.2
Labour	Thomas Rannachan	6,875	27.1	▼17.9	6,270	24.6	▼15.3
Conservative	Thomas Kerr	3,151	12.4	▲6.9	3,098	12.2	▲7.4
Green					1,436	5.6	▲3.1
UKIP					716	2.8	▲2.2
TUSC	Jamie Cocozza	583	2.3	New			
Solidarity					399	1.6	New
Liberal Democrats	Giovanni Caccavello	568	2.2	▲0.5	392	1.5	▲0.2
BUP					318	1.2	New
RISE					213	0.8	New
Animal Welfare					164	0.6	New
Women's Equality					149	0.6	New
Scottish Christian					146	0.6	▼0.1
Independent	Andrew McCullagh				28	0.1	New
Majority		7,323	28.9	▲26.1			
Valid votes		25,375			25,489		
Invalid votes		131			48		
Turnout		25,506	44.0	▲5.9	25,537	44.0	▲5.9
SNP hold		Swing		▲13.1			
Notes

2011 Scottish Parliament election: Glasgow Shettleston
Party	Candidate	Constituency			Regional		
Party	Candidate	Votes	%	±%	Votes	%	±%
SNP	John Mason	10,128	47.8	N/A	8,802	41.5	N/A
Labour	Frank McAveety (Note: Incumbent member for this constituency)	9,542	45.0	N/A	8,456	39.9	N/A
Conservative	David Wilson	1,163	5.5	N/A	1,016	4.8	N/A
Respect					588	2.8	N/A
Green					529	2.5	N/A
BNP					325	1.5	N/A
Liberal Democrats	Ruaraidh Dobson	371	1.7	N/A	281	1.3	N/A
All-Scotland Pensioners Party					254	1.2	N/A
Socialist Labour					211	1.0	N/A
Scottish Unionist					210	1.0	N/A
Scottish Christian					146	0.7	N/A
Scottish Socialist					138	0.7	N/A
UKIP					119	0.6	N/A
Pirate					63	0.3	N/A
Scottish Homeland Party					49	0.2	N/A
Independent	Caroline Johnstone				26	0.1	N/A
Majority		586	2.8	N/A			
Valid votes		21,204			21,213		
Invalid votes		109			90		
Turnout		21,313	38.1	N/A	21,303	38.1	N/A
SNP win (new boundaries)							

=== 2000s ===
2007 Scottish Parliament election: Glasgow Shettleston
Party	Candidate	Votes	%	±%
Labour	Frank McAveety	7,574	51.2	−5.4
SNP	John McLaughlin	4,693	31.7	+13.5
Liberal Democrats	Ross Renton	1,182	8.0	+3.3
Conservative	William McNair	946	6.4	+0.5
Scottish Christian	Bob Graham	406	2.7	New
Majority		2,881	19.5	−18.9
Rejected ballots		2,035		
Turnout		14,801	33.4	−2.0
Labour hold		Swing	-9.5	

2003 Scottish Parliament election: Glasgow Shettleston
Party	Candidate	Votes	%	±%
Labour	Frank McAveety	9,365	56.6	+2.7
SNP	Jim Byrne	3,018	18.2	−9.1
Scottish Socialist	Rosie Kane	2,403	14.5	+6.6
Conservative	Dorothy Luckhurst	982	5.9	−0.2
Liberal Democrats	Lewis Hutton	779	4.7	+0.1
Majority		6,347	38.4	+11.8
Turnout		16,547	35.4	−7.4
Labour hold		Swing		

=== 1990s ===
,

1999 Scottish Parliament election: Glasgow Shettleston
Party	Candidate	Votes	%	±%
Labour	Frank McAveety	11,078	53.9	N/A
SNP	Jim Byrne	5,611	27.3	N/A
Scottish Socialist	Rosie Kane	1,640	7.9	N/A
Conservative	Colin Bain	1,260	6.1	N/A
Liberal Democrats	Laurence Clarke	943	4.6	N/A
Majority		5,467	26.6	N/A
Turnout		20,532	42.8	N/A
Labour win (new seat)				

== See also ==
- Glasgow Shettleston (UK Parliament constituency)
- Politics of Glasgow
