= Glasgow Baillieston (Scottish Parliament constituency) =

Region or constituency of the Scottish Parliament

- Former burgh constituency for the Scottish Parliament

- Glasgow Baillieston shown within the Glasgow electoral region and the region shown within Scotland

Former constituency
- Created: 1999
- Abolished: 2011
- Council area: Glasgow City

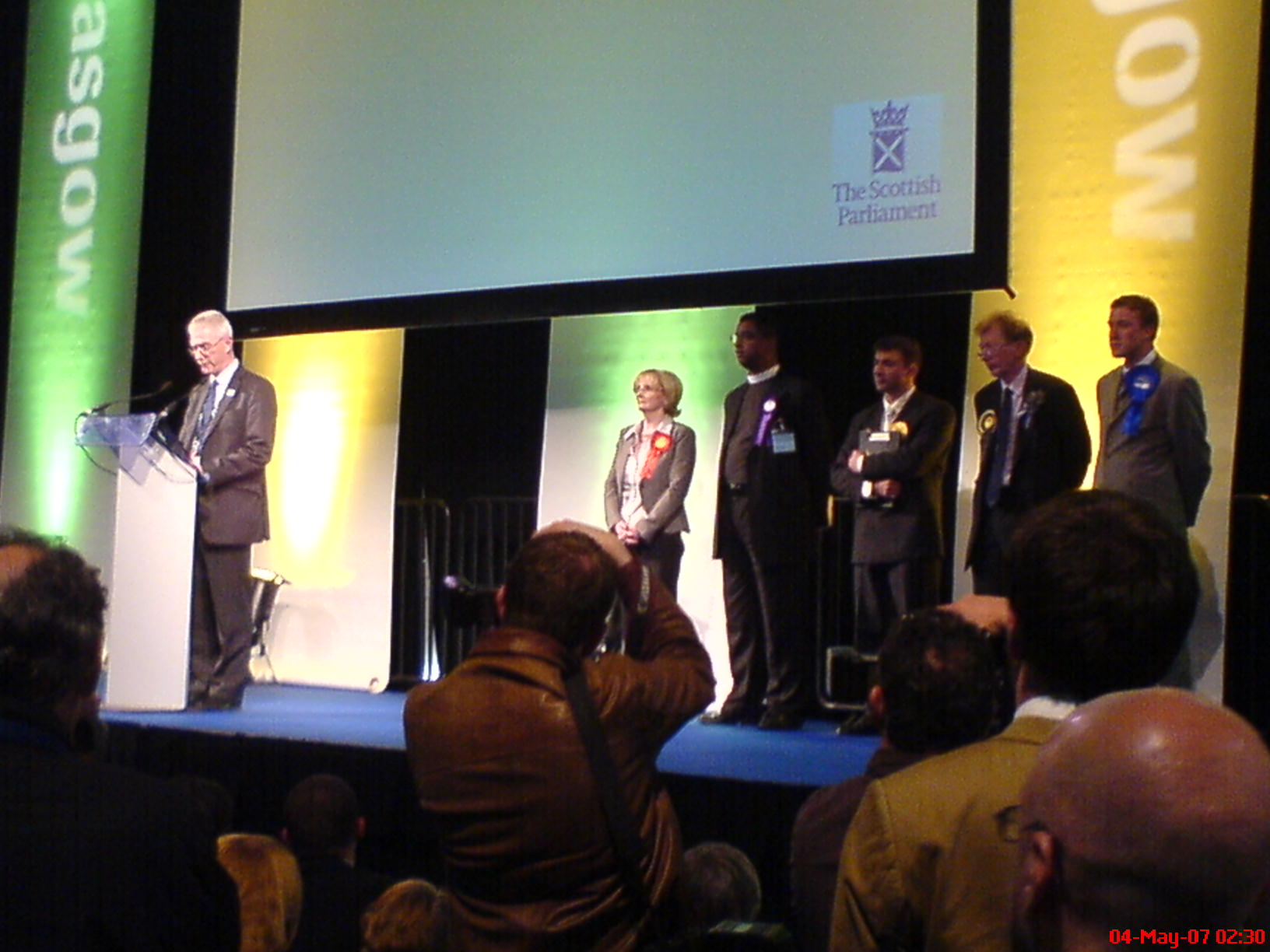
Declaration of results in Glasgow Baillieston constituency in the 2007 Scottish Parliament election.

Glasgow Baillieston was a constituency of the Scottish Parliament (Holyrood). It elected one Member of the Scottish Parliament (MSP) by the plurality (first past the post) method of election. The seat was represented by Labour's Margaret Curran from the inception of the Scottish Parliament in 1999 until her retirement in 2011.

For the 2011 Scottish Parliament election, the constituency was abolished. The Baillieston electoral ward was divided between Provan and Shettleston seats.

== Constituency boundaries ==
The current Glasgow Baillieston constituency was created at the same time as the Scottish Parliament, in 1999, with the name and boundaries of an existing Westminster constituency. In 2005, however, Scottish Westminster (House of Commons) constituencies were mostly replaced with new constituencies.

The Holyrood constituency was entirely within the Glasgow City council area, on the area's eastern boundary. It was east of the Shettleston and Springburn constituencies and north of the Rutherglen constituency. Shettleston and Springburn were also entirely within the city area. Rutherglen straddles the boundary between the Glasgow City and South Lanarkshire council areas.

== Boundary review ==
Following their First Periodic review of constituencies to the Scottish Parliament the Boundary Commission for Scotland recommended the abolition of the Baillieston constituency. The Garrowhill, Bailliston, Swinton, and Barlanark areas of the Baillieston electoral area were combined with Calton and Shettleston, to form an enlarged Glasgow Shettleston constituency, whilst the East Centre, North East, and remaining areas of the Baillieston ward form a newly created Glasgow Provan constituency.

== Constituency profile ==
The constituency included the areas of Ballieston, Mount Vernon, Easterhouse, Barlanark and Gartloch. It is industrial in character and has high levels of unemployment, one-parent families and drug abuse.

== Member of the Scottish Parliament ==
Election	Member	Party
1999	Margaret Curran	Labour
2011	Constituency abolished; see Glasgow Provan and Glasgow Shettleston	

== Election results ==
2007 Scottish Parliament election: Glasgow Ballieston
Party	Candidate	Votes	%	±%
Labour	Margaret Curran	9,141	52.9	0.0
SNP	Lachlan McNeill	5,207	30.2	+11.2
Conservative	Richard Sullivan	1,276	7.4	−0.7
Liberal Democrats	David Jackson	1,060	6.1	−0.5
Scottish Christian	George Hargreaves	588	3.4	New
Majority		3,934	22.7	−10.8
Rejected ballots		1,850		
Turnout		17,272	38.9	−0.5
Labour hold		Swing		

2003 Scottish Parliament election: Glasgow Ballieston
Party	Candidate	Votes	%	±%
Labour	Margaret Curran	9,657	52.9	+5.3
SNP	Lachlan McNeill	3,479	19.0	−15.7
Scottish Socialist	Jim McVicar	2,461	13.5	+5.6
Conservative	Janette McAlpine	1,472	8.1	+1.7
Liberal Democrats	David Jackson	1,201	6.6	+3.2
Majority		6,178	33.9	+21.0
Turnout		18,270	39.4	
Labour hold		Swing	+5.2	

,

1999 Scottish Parliament election: Glasgow Ballieston
Party	Candidate	Votes	%	±%
Labour	Margaret Curran	11,289	47.61	N/A
SNP	Dorothy Grace Elder	8,217	34.66	N/A
Scottish Socialist	Jim McVicar	1,864	7.86	N/A
Conservative	Dr Kate Pickering	1,526	6.44	N/A
Liberal Democrats	Judith Fryer	813	3.43	N/A
Majority		3,072	12.95	N/A
Turnout		23,709		N/A
Labour win (new seat)				

== See also ==
- Politics of Glasgow
