= Frank McAveety =

Scottish politician (born 1962)

Cllr Frank McAveety
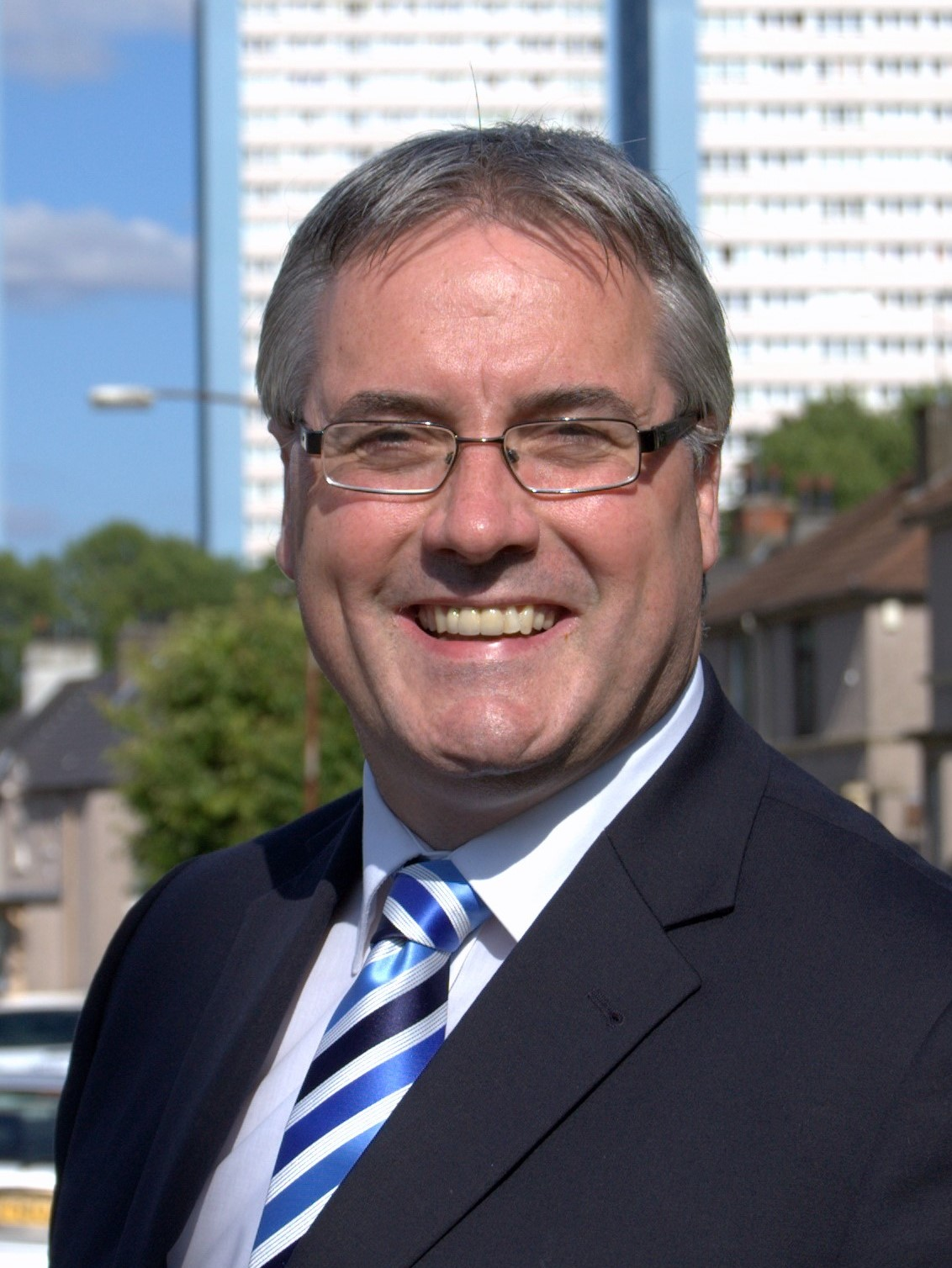
- McAveety in 2010

Leader of Glasgow City Council
- In office 10 September 2015 – 4 May 2017
- Preceded by: Gordon Matheson
- Succeeded by: Susan Aitken
- In office 1997–1999
- Preceded by: Bob Gould
- Succeeded by: Charlie Gordon

Shettleston (ward)
- Incumbent
- Assumed office 3 May 2012
- Preceded by: Euan McLeod

Member of the Scottish Parliament for Glasgow Shettleston
- In office 6 May 1999 – 22 March 2011
- Preceded by: Office established
- Succeeded by: John Mason

Personal details
- Born: 27 July 1962 (age 64) Glasgow, Scotland
- Party: Scottish Labour
- Education: University of Strathclyde (BA); St Andrew's College of Education (PGCE)
- Occupation: Teacher (English and History)

Francis McAveety (born 27 July 1962) is a Scottish Labour Party politician who served as Leader of Glasgow City Council from 2015 to 2017. He has been a councillor for the Shettleston ward of Glasgow. He was previously the Member of the Scottish Parliament (MSP) for the Glasgow Shettleston constituency from 1999 to 2011.

== Early life ==
McAveety was born 27 July 1962 in Glasgow and brought up in the city's Barmulloch district. He was educated in Glasgow at All Saints Secondary School, followed by the University of Strathclyde, from which he graduated in 1983, with a Bachelor of Arts degree in English and History.

After receiving a Postgraduate Certificate in Education from St Andrew's College of Education (now part of the University of Glasgow) in 1984, McAveety began a career as a secondary school teacher. He taught English at schools across the South side and the East End of Glasgow.

== Political career ==
=== Glasgow councillor ===
He was a member of Glasgow District Council from 1988 until 1996 and served as Convenor of the Arts and Culture Committee, which developed the Glasgow Gallery of Modern Art and initiated plans for the large-scale redevelopment of Kelvingrove Gallery in Glasgow.

McAveety served as Leader of the Glasgow City Council from 1997 until 1999, during which time he initiated the largest-ever investment package for Glasgow Secondary Schools and oversaw the removal of housing debt for City Housing Tenants. He also established the first ever Local Authority Standards Committee, which was the influence for the establishment of the Standards Commission for Scotland by the Scottish Parliament, a few years later.

=== Scottish Parliament ===
When elected to the Scottish Parliament in 1999, he was appointed Deputy Minister for Local Government in the Scottish Executive and served in that position until 2000. He returned to office as Deputy Minister for Health and Community Care in May 2002. As Minister for Tourism, Culture and Sport following the 2003 Scottish Parliament election, he established the National Theatre of Scotland, which has resulted in the award-winning play, Black Watch and other productions. In his capacity as Sports Minister, McAveety advocated using sports investment as an opportunity for community regeneration and he oversaw Scotland's largest ever investment in national sports infrastructure, being developed in the East End of Glasgow. He also conducted a successful campaign to bring the headquarters of Sportscotland, the national sports agency, to the East End of Glasgow.

In 2004, he was mocked by a Sheriff Court judge after charges against two anti-war protesters were dropped after an altercation with the two protesters and a Labour council candidate. McAveety had claimed they had put him through the "worst intimidation in his life" during an altercation in the southside of Glasgow. In dismissing the case however, Sheriff Graeme Warner said that McAveety "must have lived a very sheltered life" and had "completely blown his credibility".

A week later, he was forced to apologise for misleading parliament when he turned up late for a ministerial question time claiming to have been unavoidably detained on ministerial business. It was later discovered that he was actually eating pie, beans and roast potatoes in the parliament canteen. The incident was dubbed by some as "porky pie-gate" and is said to have led First Minister Jack McConnell to sack him from his cabinet later that year.

McAveety was re-elected to the Scottish Parliament on 3 May 2007 after winning more than 50% of the vote in Glasgow Shettleston and until June 2010 he served as Convener of the Public Petitions Committee and was the Scottish Labour Party's Shadow Minister for Sport.

On 16 June 2010 he resigned as Convenor of the Scottish Parliament's Public Petitions Committee after being overheard making comments about the physical appearance of a female member of the audience during a break in committee proceedings. The comments were broadcast because he had not switched off his microphone. McAveety said: "There's a very attractive girl in the second row, dark... and dusky. We'll maybe put a wee word out for her."

McAveety led a campaign in 2009 to establish access for children free of charge to professional football matches in Scotland. He is a keen supporter of Celtic F.C. and the Scotland national team and, while an MSP, was a regular player for the Scottish Parliamentary Football Team, which has taken part in a number of high-profile charity events.

McAveety is known for his knowledge of various genres of modern popular music. He has written in praise of David Bowie in the Scotsman newspaper and he wrote a regular feature for Holyrood Magazine, which celebrated and recommended his favourite albums. In April 2005, the Scotsman newspaper dubbed him the "Daddy of Parliamentary Pop". This was in reference to his speech in the Parliamentary Chamber in support of a motion recognising Franz Ferdinand for that band's contribution to Scottish popular music and culture.

McAveety has served as a board member for the Arches Theatre Company in Glasgow, Enterprise Scotland and the Scottish Exhibition and Conference Centre. From January 2009 he served on the boards of the Scottish Youth Theatre and Fields in Trust Scotland (formerly National Playing Fields Association).

In the 2011 Scottish Parliament election, he lost his seat to the SNP's John Mason but he made an early return to politics in May 2012, when he was elected as a Councillor for the Shettleston ward of Glasgow City Council.

On 10 September 2015, McAveety was elected leader of Glasgow City Council after Gordon Matheson stood down, thus returning to a post he had held sixteen years earlier. He was succeeded by Susan Aitken on 4 May 2017.

On 15 April 2025, McAveety was arrested and charged with electoral fraud relating to the 2022 council election.

== See also ==
- List of Scottish Executive Ministerial Teams

Scottish Parliament
New parliament Scotland Act 1998	Member of the Scottish Parliament for Glasgow Shettleston; 1999–2011	Succeeded by John Mason
Political offices
Preceded by Mike Watson	Minister for Tourism, Culture and Sport; 2003–2004	Succeeded by Patricia Ferguson
Preceded by Hugh Henry	Deputy Minister for Health and Community Care; 2002–2003	Succeeded by Tom McCabe
New office	Deputy Minister for Local Government; 1999–2000	Office abolished
