= Operation Branchform =

Police Scotland investigation into fundraising fraud in the SNP

Operation Branchform was a Police Scotland investigation into fundraising fraud in the Scottish National Party (SNP) that was launched in July 2021 and concluded in March 2025. The investigation initially concerned allegations that £666,953 raised by the SNP since 2017 specifically to campaign in a proposed second Scottish independence referendum was in part improperly spent on other activities. Operation Branchform uncovered extensive embezzlement perpetrated between 2010 and 2022 by Peter Murrell, former SNP chief executive and husband of former party leader and First Minister of Scotland Nicola Sturgeon, for which he was imprisoned in 2026.

Described as "the highest-profile scandal of the Scottish devolution era", Operation Branchform lasted for nearly four years, covered the tenures of three First Ministers and two Chief Constables of Police Scotland, and ultimately cost almost £2.7 million. The investigation was widely believed to have precipitated the resignation of Nicola Sturgeon as SNP leader and First Minister, and saw the highly publicised arrests of Murrell, Sturgeon, and SNP treasurer Colin Beattie in 2023. Media coverage of Operation Branchform and perceived delays in bringing the case to a conclusion led both the SNP's supporters and its opponents to claim that the investigation had been politicised. In March 2025, Police Scotland concluded their investigations into Sturgeon and Beattie, with no charges being filed against them. Murrell was charged with embezzlement that month, and admitted to embezzling funds worth £400,000 at the High Court on 25 May 2026. On 23 June 2026, Murrell was sentenced to five years and three months in prison.

The missing ring-fenced referendum fund that prompted the police investigation into the SNP's finances remains largely unaccounted for, with the SNP admitting in 2026 that it had been spent on routine party activities. SNP figures who raised initial concerns over the party's finances have called for further investigations into what they describe as a lack of transparency and effective governance within the party that enabled Murrell's thefts. The Scottish media and opposition politicians have questioned why the police and Crown Office chose not to bring prosecutions related to the disappearance of the ring-fenced fund. The SNP leadership has rejected calls for further inquiries into the actions of the party, police, and Crown Office in the case, insisting that the party was the victim of criminality and that Murrell acted alone.

== Background ==
=== Peter Murrell as SNP chief executive ===
Peter Murrell was appointed chief executive officer of the Scottish National Party in 2001 by John Swinney. The party's success in the 2007 elections, where it became the largest party in the Scottish Parliament and formed a minority government led by Alex Salmond, was credited to organisation by Murrell. In 2010, Murrell married the party's then-Depute Leader, Nicola Sturgeon, with whom he had been in a relationship since 2003.

From 2010, Murrell abused his position to embezzle money from the SNP's funds. Murrell's thefts were relatively small until 2016, when the scale of his embezzlement accelerated. The majority of his thefts occurred between 2019 and 2022. His first major purchase, a £33,000 Volkswagen Golf, was made in early 2016 using £16,489 of SNP money. He also used £57,500 of party cash to buy a Jaguar I-Pace car in 2019, and sold it for £47,378.76 two years later. Murrell also spent £124,550 on a luxury Niesmann + Bischoff motorhome, paid for in 2020 entirely with party funds. Murrell created false documents to disguise the payment as a legitimate party expense. Murrell also used SNP funds for extensive purchases of luxury items, including two Bremont watches for a total of £9,350, a £4,225 Montblanc Starwalker World Time fountain pen, £500 of Le Creuset crockery, a £3,500 Hamilton & Inches silver wine coaster, and a £160 Folio Society edition of Hannah Arendt's The Origins of Totalitarianism.

=== Early concerns surrounding SNP finances ===
Fundraising by the SNP for a proposed second Scottish independence referendum began in 2017. The fundraising effort was closed down after the snap general election of that year. Labour Party MSP James Kelly asked the Electoral Commission to investigate whether the SNP had spent the money on campaigning in the general election. The SNP denied this, saying the money raised was ring-fenced for a future referendum campaign. A second fundraiser followed in April 2019. This fundraiser also claimed to be ring-fencing donations for a specific purpose, saying "Our plan is to distribute An Independent Scotland: Household Guide to every household – all 2,460,000 of them! To achieve that, I am asking you to join me in making a donation to this specific project".

In January 2020, the pro-independence blogger Stuart Campbell, through his website Wings Over Scotland, claimed that the SNP's published accounts for 2018 did not contain enough money to cover the ring-fenced sums that were said to have been raised. The SNP dismissed allegations that the money had been spent on party activities as "utter nonsense" and "categorically not true".

In October 2020, the Electoral Commission published the SNP's 2019 accounts. These did not list the referendum campaign funds separately and showed that the money the SNP had to hand, around £97,000, was again much less than the amount that was said to be ring-fenced. The SNP's then treasurer, Colin Beattie, emailed SNP donors regarding allegations that the referendum campaign fund had already been spent. Beattie insisted that there was £593,501 in the "Referendum Appeal Fund" that was ready to be deployed "instantaneously", and that the SNP did not separate restricted funds from the rest of the annual accounts. Beattie claimed that the donations were "woven through" the income figures for that year.

=== Resignation of SNP finance officers ===
In the SNP internal elections of November 2020, Douglas Chapman was elected as SNP National Treasurer, replacing Colin Beattie. Chapman was seen as part of an "awkward squad" of activists and politicians, which included Joanna Cherry and Roger Mullin, who were elected in opposition to Nicola Sturgeon's leadership and approach to gaining a second independence referendum.

In early 2021, three members of the SNP's Finance and Audit Committee (FAC), Cllr Frank Ross, Cynthia Guthrie and Allison Graham, became concerned at what they described as "chaotic" and "incompetent" financial management. Speaking to LBC after Murrell's imprisonment in 2026, Graham and Guthrie described a toxic culture within the SNP which they said discouraged scrutiny, tolerated poor governance, and was excessively deferential towards the party leadership. Graham described seeing budgetary figures for 2020 that were incorrect by £1.51 million, and recalled a budget that the Finance and Audit Committee had not seen being passed regardless by the SNP National Executive Committee (NEC).

In March 2021, Ross, Guthrie, and Graham chose to resign from the FAC over lack of access to party accounts. They agreed a joint resignation statement that was read out at the NEC in March 2021, saying that "inadequate" information had left them unable to perform their duties, which was due to "obvious procrastination by the CEO": "This has extended to ignoring our requests and simply failing to provide basic information which members of FAC require to be able to carry out our work. We can only conclude that there is a clear intention to prevent the FAC from doing its work for whatever reason."

Graham claimed that the statement was met with invective and abuse from the rest of the committee. The statement was not included in minutes later produced by the NEC. Video footage of the meeting, leaked to the press in 2023, showed Nicola Sturgeon telling the committee to be "very careful" about suggesting that there were problems with the party's finances: "There are no reasons for people to be concerned about the party's finances, and all of us need to be careful about not suggesting that there is." Guthrie came to the conclusion that the ring-fenced referendum fund had been allowed to "seep into the accounts", and that attempts to conceal this further enabled Murrell's embezzlement. Guthrie joined the rival splinter Alba Party following its launch one week later, and was one of their lead candidates in the next month's Scottish election.

As a result of the resignation of the three FAC members, long-time Scottish independence campaigner Sean Clerkin made a complaint to Police Scotland about the allegedly missing funds at the end of March 2021. On 30 March 2021, former SNP MP George Kerevan and SNP Common Weal Group founder Craig Berry also resigned from the party, saying in a statement: "Elected representatives of the party rank and file have been denied their legitimate voice at online meetings of the National Executive, branch motions to National Conference have been summarily ignored, and mandated national gatherings cancelled without explanation. Significant questions remained to be asked regarding party finances and internal paid appointments because of the non-functioning of the party finance committee." Both Kerevan and Berry subsequently joined the Alba Party.

In May 2021, Douglas Chapman also resigned as SNP National Treasurer, saying he "had not received the support or financial information required to carry out the fiduciary duties of National Treasurer". Interviewed on the BBC's Sunday Show, then-Deputy First Minister John Swinney said he did not understand what had prompted Chapman's actions and said that he was unaware of a police complaint into the SNP's finances. Swinney insisted that between the National Executive Committee, external auditors, and the Electoral Commission, there was "a huge amount of scrutiny of party finances". Nicola Sturgeon, then party leader and wife to Peter Murrell, then the party's chief executive, took over as acting treasurer, with Electoral Commission rules requiring someone to be in the post at all times.

Joanna Cherry MP also resigned from the SNP's National Executive Committee later that month, saying on Twitter, "A number of factors have prevented me from fulfilling the mandate party members gave me to improve transparency & scrutiny & to uphold the party's constitution. I won’t be making any further comment at this stage".

Roger Mullin, who remained on the National Executive Committee, later accused Peter Murrell, Nicola Sturgeon, and then-Business Convenor Kirsten Oswald, of seeking to shut down attempts to improve governance, accountability, and scrutiny within the party. Mullin accused Oswald, who chaired NEC meetings, of being "just a mouthpiece for Nicola Sturgeon and Peter Murrell", and recalled an incident where Murrell said that information on party wages was never provided to the committee.

A month after Chapman's resignation, Peter Murrell loaned more than £107,620 to the party. This loan was not declared to the Electoral Commission until August 2022, more than a year late.

Beattie was re-appointed as SNP Treasurer in June 2021. After a SNP NEC meeting that month, Beattie said £666,953 had been raised through referendum-related fundraisers from 2017 to 2020, and that £51,760 had been spent directly on campaigning for another referendum. He said funds were "earmarked" for that purpose, and "amounts equivalent to the sums raised" would be spent on "the intended purpose".

== Police investigation ==
=== Early investigation, 2021–2022 ===
The police investigation was launched in July 2021 following seven complaints. These included allegations that ring-fenced referendum funds were instead spent on legal costs for Peter Murrell during the Alex Salmond sexual harassment scandal, and for SNP MEP Alyn Smith during a defamation case against the Brexit Party. Funds were also reported to have been spent on the refurbishment of the party's offices. Police Scotland was said to be "at loggerheads" with the Crown Office and Procurator Fiscal Service over the decision to announce a formal investigation.

In August 2021, Sturgeon told a Zoom meeting of the SNP's NEC that, "We don't need to talk about the finances. The finances are absolutely fine". The meeting - which was recorded and released publicly in April 2023 - was to discuss a report commissioned by depute leader Keith Brown on financial transparency, following the resignation of Douglas Chapman. Brown's report recommended a "monthly written summary of income and expenditure, confirmed via the bank account", to increase transparency. According to a party source, Sturgeon insisted that "there was nothing wrong with the accounts and that people should stop talking about it because it was undermining the party. It's fair to say she was pretty raging about it. She went on at some length telling everyone that everything was absolutely fine and that it shouldn't be discussed." The recommendations in Brown's report were not acted on.

In September 2021, The Times reported that Police Scotland had received a search warrant from the Crown Office to obtain documents from the SNP's auditors, the accounting firm Johnston Carmichael.

In 2022, a peer-review of the operation was conducted by the National Crime Agency, which the police described as normal "good practice".

In October 2022, the accountant firm Johnston Carmichael resigned from auditing the SNP's finances, after over a decade working with the party. The news of their departure was kept from the party's NEC and did not become public knowledge until April 2023. The SNP would be without auditors for over six months.

In December 2022, Wings Over Scotland reported that a loan of £107,620 made to the SNP in June 2021 had come from the party's then-CEO Peter Murrell, and that the Electoral Commission had not been informed until over a year later, in August 2022, breach of the commission's reporting rules. The stated reason for the loan was to assist with the party's cash-flow after the Scottish Parliament election in May 2021, although by April 2023 the majority of the loan had not been repaid, with £60,000 still outstanding.

=== 2023 ===
In February 2023, it was reported that the police planned to speak to key witnesses within the party. Former party treasurer Douglas Chapman, as well as several other former officials from the party's governing body, were subsequently reported to have been contacted by police in the days before Nicola Sturgeon announced her intention to resign as First Minister. In the same period, there were calls for Murrell to stand down because of the investigation into the loan he had made to the SNP.

Nicola Sturgeon announced her intention to resign as First Minister and SNP leader on 13 February 2023. The announcement was described as a surprise by media outlets and prompted speculation that her decision was connected to the ongoing police investigation into the SNP's finances. Sturgeon has maintained that her decision to resign was provoked by occupational burnout.

==== Peter Murrell arrested ====
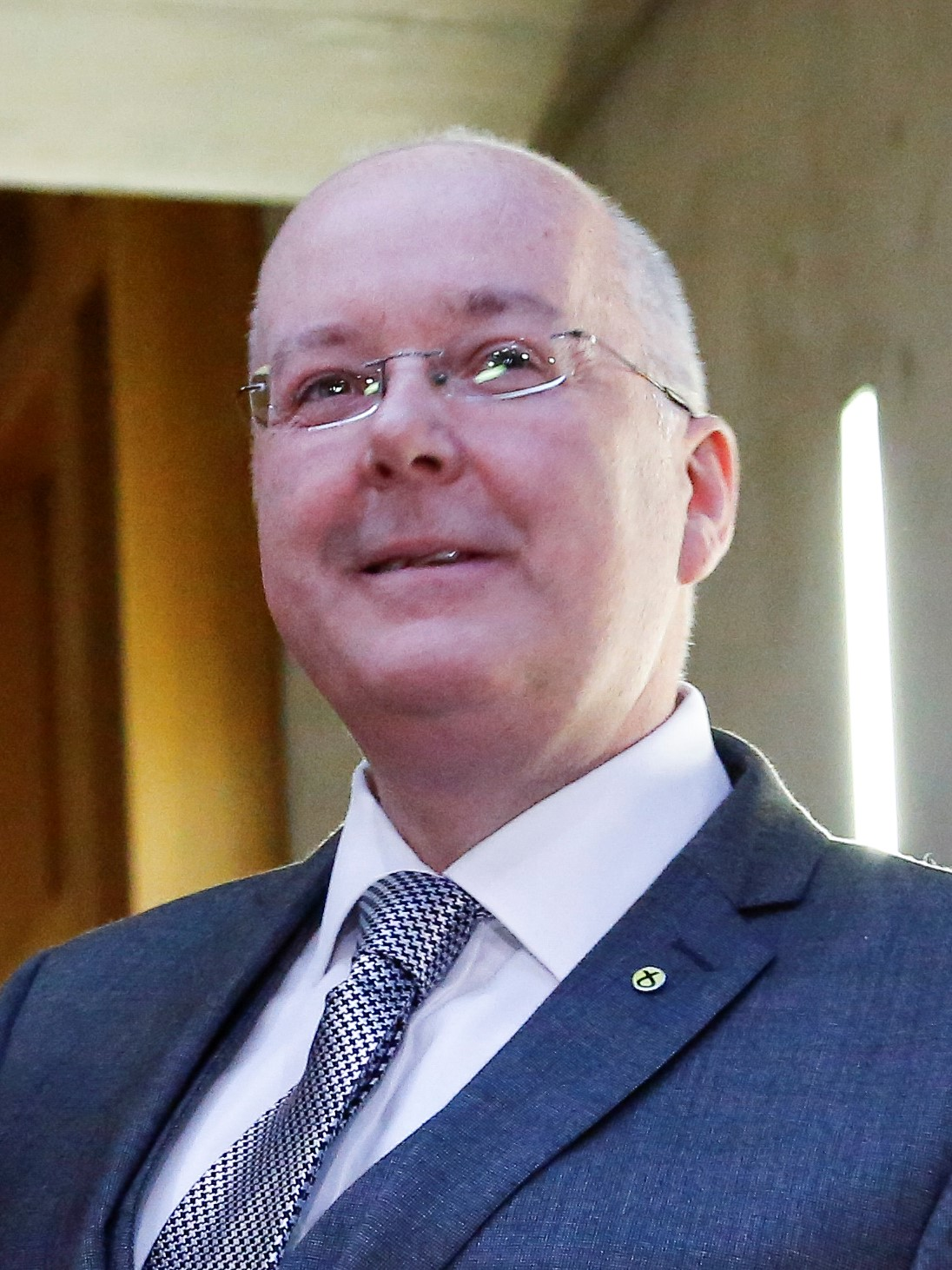
Peter Murrell in 2014.

Peter Murrell resigned as SNP chief executive in March 2023 owing to a dispute over membership numbers during the SNP leadership election. On 5 April 2023, Murrell was arrested by Police Scotland in connection with Operation Branchform, with the police saying they were conducting searches at a number of addresses. The police searched Murrell and Sturgeon's private residence in Glasgow, including the garden, and also searched and removed documentation from the SNP's headquarters in Edinburgh. After questioning, Murrell was released without charge pending further investigation. A Niesmann + Bischoff motorhome, with a sales price of around £110,000, was subsequently seized from the home of Peter Murrell's mother in Fife as part of the investigation. Neighbours reported that the motorhome had never been moved. The party's treasurer, Colin Beattie, said he did not know about the purchase of the motorhome at the time.

The police's tactics in their search of Sturgeon and Murrell's home were questioned by Scottish Nationalists. The erection of a blue forensic tent over the front door was denounced by numerous SNP figures, and became one of the defining images of the investigation. Noel Dolan, a former special adviser to Nicola Sturgeon, said: "I believe the police behaviour in the use of tents outside and invading the former First Minister's home has been very heavy handed. It was completely over the top." Dolan called for the issue of police powers to be raised in the Scottish Parliament. His comments were criticised by Calum Steele, general secretary of the Scottish Police Federation, as "based on theory rather than fact". Police Scotland declined to comment on an ongoing investigation. Others claimed that the investigation was a conspiracy: SNP MSP James Dornan accused the police and media of having "some kind of collusion about making sure the media are in attendance when the slightest thing happens", and described the search of the Sturgeon-Murrell home as "like Fred West's house". Police Scotland denied any suggestion that the media was informed of the search ahead of time, and insisted that the use of tents was to maintain privacy from the media. Mairianna Clyde, a former SNP candidate for the City of Edinburgh Council who was later reselected for the 2024 council by-election, wrote on Twitter: "We should be completely clear about the events of the last few days. The British establishment could not destroy the SNP at the polls. So they are destroying us through the media and a deliberately protracted overblown police and legal action."

Questions were also raised over the time taken to approve the warrant for the search of Sturgeon and Murrell's home: The Scottish Sun reported that the request for a warrant was first made on 20 March, but was not approved and sent to a sheriff for two weeks before it was executed on 5 April. It was suggested that this was to avoid being seen to influence the result of the 2023 Scottish National Party leadership election. This was denied by the Crown Office, which described such allegations as an "unacceptable slur" on the integrity of the Lord Advocate Dorothy Bain, and on the Crown Office's public prosecutors. Owing to the political nature of the allegations, the First Minister Humza Yousaf said that both the Lord Advocate and the Solicitor General Ruth Charteris - whose offices are political appointments in the Scottish Government - would recuse themselves from the investigation.

It was announced in early April, after Murrell's arrest, that accountants Johnston Carmichael had resigned from auditing the SNP's finances (both for the central party and the Westminster Parliamentary group), after over a decade working with the party. It later emerged that they had done so "around October" 2022, according to Humza Yousaf, the new leader of the SNP, who also said he was unaware that the party was without auditors until he took office. The news of their departure was kept from the party's NEC. Over £1 million of Short Money, public funds payable to the SNP group in Parliament, was at risk if the SNP did not produce audited accounts for their Westminster Group by 31 May 2023. It was announced on 3 May 2023 that the SNP had appointed new auditors, the AMS Accountants Group in Manchester, over six months after the previous auditors had resigned. The SNP Westminster Group ultimately submitted their audited accounts before the 31 May 2023 deadline.

Legal costs from the investigation were reported to have contributed to the SNP having financial difficulties by April 2023.

==== Colin Beattie arrested ====
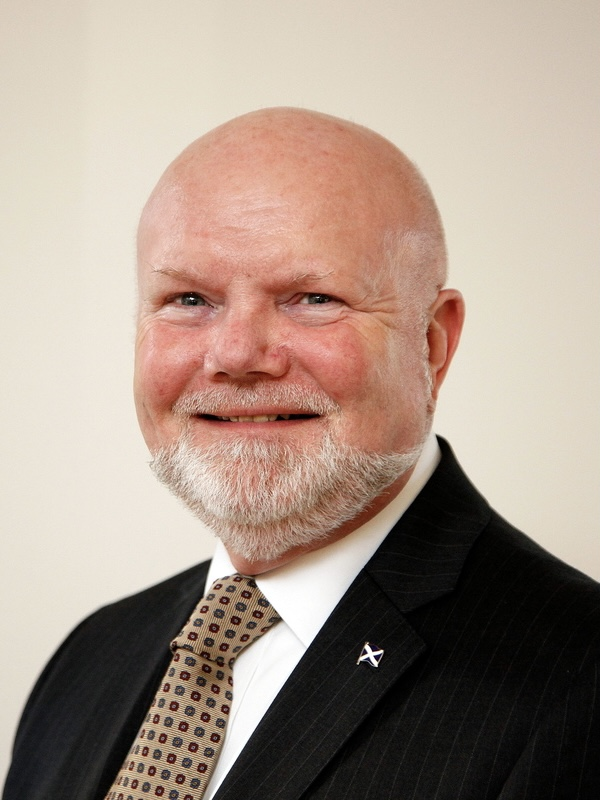
Colin Beattie in 2016

On 18 April 2023, Colin Beattie was arrested in connection with the investigation. He was released without charge pending further investigation later the same day. He resigned as party treasurer the next day. MP Stuart McDonald was appointed as the new treasurer.

In May 2023, Murray Foote, previously SNP media chief, openly denounced the conduct of the Police Scotland investigation. Foote had resigned as SNP media chief in March 2023 after repeating misleading party membership numbers that had been given to him by Peter Murrell. Foote said that the possibility that Branchform is a "wild goose chase" should be considered, and warned of "serious consequences for the investigating authorities" should no charges be brought. Foote denounced the police search of Sturgeon and Murrell's home as "a grotesque circus", and insisted on Peter Murrell's innocence and integrity: "First minister Sturgeon and her husband lived under crushingly intense scrutiny. It is inconceivable to me that Peter would so much as consider doing something dodgy lest it rebound and put his wife in jeopardy."

Sir Iain Livingstone, then Chief Constable of Police Scotland, defended the investigation at a meeting of the Scottish Police Authority on 25 May 2023, saying that; "A diligent, thorough and proportionate criminal inquiry is being conducted with integrity. I have previously asserted and will reassert today that I would fiercely resist any attempt to bring political pressure to my decision making or upon any police operation."

==== Nicola Sturgeon arrested ====
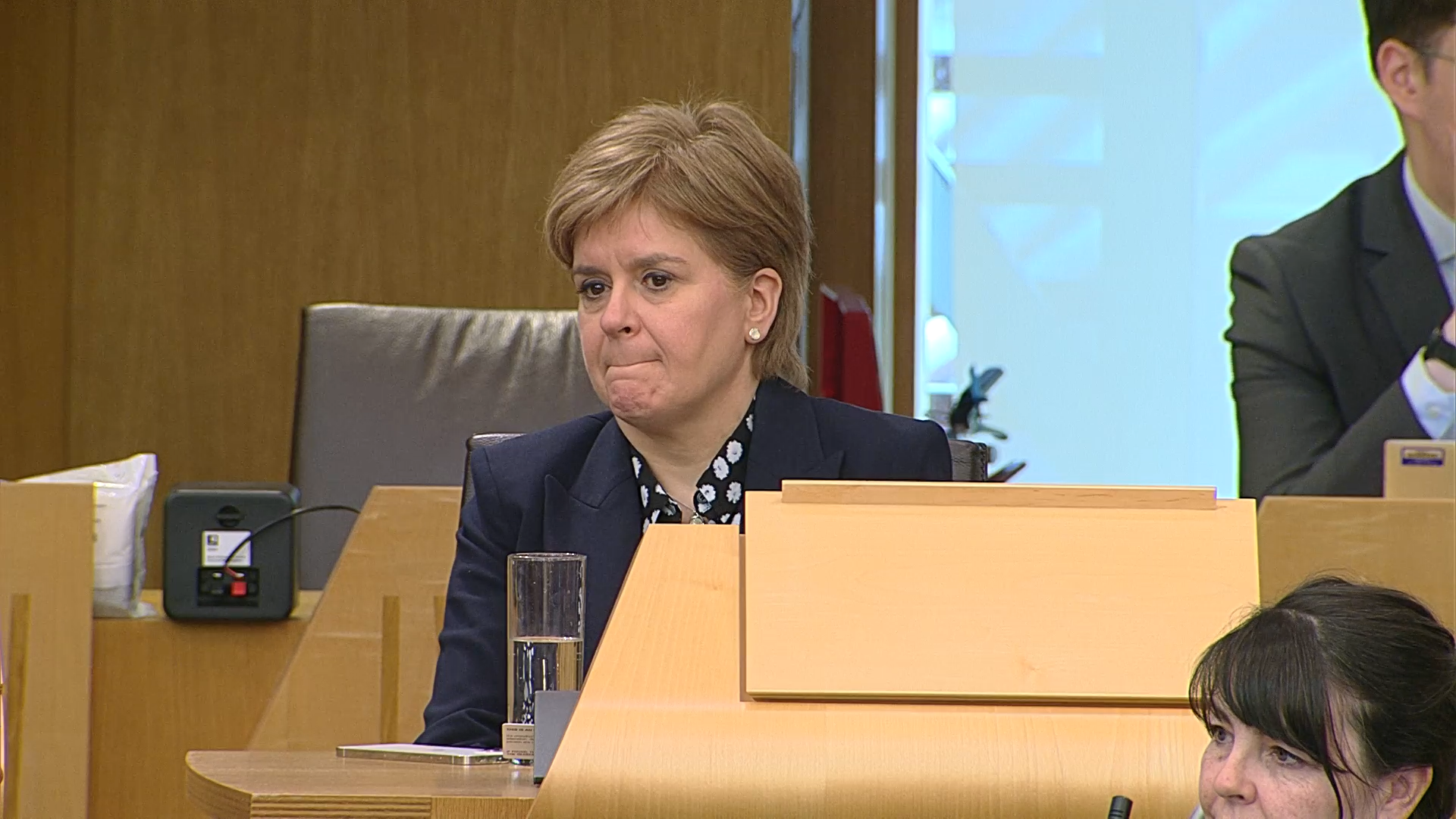
Nicola Sturgeon in March 2023, four months prior to her arrest.

Widespread speculation that Nicola Sturgeon could be arrested for police questioning came to fruition when, on 11 June 2023, she was arrested in connection with the investigation. Later that day, she was released without charge. Some SNP politicians, including Ash Regan MSP, called for Sturgeon to be suspended from the party, but new leader Humza Yousaf said he would not suspend her as she had not been charged. Information released after Peter Murrell's guilty plea in 2026 revealed that Sturgeon answered "no comment" to all detectives' questions, with The Scottish Sun reporting that Sturgeon "sat in silence for hours" at Falkirk police station following her arrest.

By the end of June, the SNP was reported to be ready to submit audited accounts to the Electoral Commission ahead of a deadline of 7 July. However, the party's Manchester-based auditors, AMS Accountants Group, qualified their audit of the accounts owing to missing documentation related to membership, donations, and raffle income for the period of 2021–2022. The SNP insisted that this was due to "administrative processes", and that "there is no suggestion that the accounts do not present an accurate picture of the party’s financial position."

In July, the police said the operation had grown beyond the initial allegation of fraud and would now look at potential embezzlement and the misuse of funds. That month, the outgoing Chief Constable, Sir Iain Livingstone, re-iterated his defence of the investigation, telling the BBC's Today programme that the time taken was proportionate to the allegations of fraud and embezzlement because of the need to obtain information from banks and other financial institutions. Addressing allegations that the search of Sturgeon and Murrell's house was heavy-handed, Livingstone described the search as proportionate to the circumstances, and specifically addressed the forensic tent: "The tent was there, as were all the other measures, to protect the interests of justice and to protect the individuals involved."

In August 2023, Murray Foote was appointed chief executive of the SNP. In view of Foote's previous comments on Operation Branchform, both the Scottish Liberal Democrats and Scottish Conservatives called on the SNP to give new assurance that it would continue to co-operate with the police inquiry. Speaking to the Daily Record, SNP leader and First Minister Humza Yousaf rejected Foote's past comments on the investigation and re-iterated that the party would cooperate fully with the police.

==== "Cash for seats" allegations ====
In late August 2023, Police Scotland confirmed that they were assessing a complaint referred to them by Greater Manchester Police. This complaint alleged that the SNP recorded unregistered cash gifts as money brought in by fundraising to conceal a "cash for seats" operation, whereby donors were prioritised for selection for elected seats. In 2026, after Peter Murrell's guilty plea, the Sunday Mail reported that Murrell had received an undeclared £50,000 cash donation from an unnamed businessman in return for helping their relative become a Member of Parliament. These donations were not reported to the Electoral Commission.

In November 2023, two former sheriffs, Kevin Drummond KC and Douglas Cusine, of the legal group Quis, warned that the Crown Office and Procurator Fiscal Service raised questions over the "protracted period of time" taken by the investigation. Drummond and Cusine said that; "The Crown is likely to have been kept up to date with the nature of the inquiry. If that is correct it can only be conjectured that either the Crown has instructed further investigation of elements of that report, or the delay is not on the part of the police but on the part of the Crown." They further added that; "In the absence of any explanation by Police Scotland or the Crown Office, the delay in such a high profile case is capable of stimulating perceptions of cover-up. For that reason alone, it can be said that the Crown Office should offer a public explanation for the lack of progress." The Crown Office said that Police Scotland had yet to submit a report to them. Sean Clerkin, who made the original report to the police, claimed that the police were "dragging their heels".

By December 2023, Police Scotland was reported to be investigating over 1,000 alleged instances of fraud as part of Operation Branchform, including the provenance of a Jaguar I-Pace worth up to £95,000 that had been bought by Peter Murrell in 2019. The car was photographed on the driveway of Murrell and Sturgeon's home in March 2021, but was reported to have been sold later that year through the car trading service We Buy Any Car.

=== 2024 ===
In January 2024, it was reported that the SNP had failed to declare to the Electoral Commission two loans worth a total of £15,000 made by Peter Murrell to the party in 2018. The loans were only declared in October 2023. Both loans were for £7,500. One was paid back within two days, while the other was paid back within two weeks. At the time the loans were made, parties were obliged to report donations higher than £7,500. Smaller donations from a single donor which exceed the reporting threshold when taken together also needed to be reported. The SNP accepted that "as both loans were in the same calendar year, they should have been reported". The Electoral Commission said that it would consider enforcement action over the late reporting of the loans, but would not act until the police investigation had concluded. The same month, Police Scotland was investigating claims that signatures were forged on documents related to SNP finances, with the named person denying that they had written the signature, or having any knowledge of the documents.

By the end of February 2024, it was reported that Police Scotland had requested to re-interview SNP staff as part of the investigation, including those who were not in place when the inquiry began. The Times reported that the move was directed by the Crown Office.

==== Peter Murrell charged ====
On 18 April 2024, Peter Murrell was re-arrested and charged with embezzlement. He was released from custody the same day, and later resigned his membership of the SNP.

On 23 May 2024, the police sent a report on their findings to Scotland's prosecution service. A Crown Office and Procurator Fiscal Service spokesman confirmed that it received a report in relation to Peter Murrell and that an investigation into two other individuals "a man aged 72 and a 53-year-old woman" were still ongoing.

==== Political developments ====
Following the 2024 United Kingdom general election, where the SNP lost 39 Westminster seats and was reduced to the second-largest party in Scotland, former SNP MPs blamed the ongoing police investigation for the scale of the defeat: Tommy Sheppard, who lost his seat to Scottish Labour, remarked; "And then there was the elephant in the room. Operation Branchform. Never mentioned, always there. Hard to fight an election with your former leaders awaiting charges, especially when many of the public perceive little distance between now and then." Mhairi Black, who stepped down as MP for Paisley and Renfrewshire South, described the investigation as reflective of deeper structural issues within the party.

On 14 August, in an interview with Sky News, Chief Constable of Police Scotland Jo Farrell confirmed that Operation Branchform was still ongoing and that Nicola Sturgeon and Colin Beattie remain under investigation. Sky News reported that Farrell said that the police were unable to "say when Operation Branchform will end". In response, SNP MSP for Glasgow Cathcart, James Dornan, shared the post on Twitter and wrote: "I have May 2026 in the draw." As the next Holyrood elections were due to be held on 7 May 2026, Dornan's comments were interpreted by many as implying that the police investigation was politically motivated. Dornan further denounced the investigation as a "farce" in conversation with other Twitter users: "The minute we're seen to even attempt to interfere in police business we would, rightly, be slaughtered. The whole thing is a farce imo [in my opinion] and there are questions for the police to answer but we need to keep our distance... I don't think it's affecting party members much, they see it for what I see it, but it does allow others to use it as a weapon whilst pretending they care about truth and honesty."

On 22 August, the SNP's accounts for 2023 were published by the Electoral Commission. The accounts showed that the party still owed Peter Murrell £60,000 for a loan of £107,620 made three years previously to support cash flow after the 2021 Scottish Parliament election. The party reported a surplus of £661,568, after reporting a deficit of £804,278 in 2022. However, this was largely accomplished from two levies on party branches, which raised £670,000 to support campaigning in the 2023 Rutherglen and Hamilton West by-election and the 2024 UK general election. The party's auditors, AMS Accounts Group of Manchester, again issued a "qualified opinion" owing to missing documentation.

==== Growing concern over delays ====
On 5 September, it was reported that Police Scotland had asked prosecutors for further guidance on the direction of the investigation into Nicola Sturgeon and Colin Beattie. An Advice and Guidance Report was sent to the Crown Office and Procurator Fiscal Service, detailing the progress of the investigation so far and asking for formal direction on how to proceed. A police spokesperson said: "On 9 August, we presented the findings of the investigation so far to the Crown Office and Procurator Fiscal Service and we await their direction on what further action should be taken." The Crown Office said the police report was under consideration. At this point, senior Crown Office lawyers were still considering whether there was sufficient evidence to prosecute Peter Murrell and whether it would be in the public interest to do so. In October 2024, nearly two months after submitting the Advice and Guidance Report, Chief Constable Jo Farrell confirmed that Police Scotland had yet to receive a response to the report and "was still awaiting direction".

On 5 October, Sean Clerkin, who made the original complaint to police in 2021, expressed frustration at the protracted nature of the investigation, and claimed to have been subject to persecution from other Scottish independence supporters: "All these years down the line I have been persecuted by nationalists who have persecuted me on social media and at rallies. Threatening to do me in, threatened to take me out and I have had death threats." Clerkin called for the investigation to be ended by the end of 2024 so it would not overshadow the 2026 Holyrood elections. Criminal defence lawyer Thomas Leonard Ross KC also expressed concern at delays in the investigation: "Once somebody is charged then they have the right to a trial within a reasonable time. Before a person is formally charged, there might be an argument as to whether the clock is efficiently [sic] running. There is absolutely no doubt that it is running in relation to Mr Murrell, so certainly the police and Crown office have to be alive to that. The police inquiry cannot go on indefinitely."

On 6 October, the Sunday Mail reported that prosecutors were investigating claims that over £100,000, supposedly spent on refurbishments to SNP party headquarters, was paid to a non-existent company. A major high street bank was reported to have flagged transactions connected with SNP accounts in 2023, with a source saying; "One of the biggest items being looked at is a six figure sum which on paper appears to have been spent creating a media suite at the Edinburgh offices. There are receipts but it is unclear whether the company named on receipts really existed." The police were said to be investigating embezzlement of up to £500,000, of which one of the largest items related to work on SNP HQ.

By the end of 2024, several more public figures had raised concerns over the time taken by the Crown Office to come to a decision: on 28 October, in a letter to The Herald, former SNP depute leader Jim Sillars expressed concern over delays in the investigation. Sillars compared the SNP's administrative arrangements to that of "a very small company", and questioned why "with only three people originally taken to a police station for questioning, and the small size of the SNP management core, apparently no conclusion can be reached after three years of police investigation and references to the Crown Office." Sillars suggested that the delays showed that the Crown Office was "unable to disentangle law from politics." On 4 December, long-time Scottish nationalist campaigner Isobel Lindsay also wrote to The Herald, accusing the Lord Advocate Dorothy Bain of failing to oversee "fair and competent operation of the Crown Office" in bringing the SNP finances investigation to a conclusion. Lindsay wrote; "Police Scotland have made it clear that they completed their job a considerable time ago so the delay in making any decision rests with the Crown Office. If no decision whether to proceed or not proceed is made early in the new year then the case will drag on into the Holyrood election period and that would surely raise issues of prejudice." In an interview on 16 December, Nicola Sturgeon said she had been told "nothing more" about the progress of the police probe since her arrest and release eighteen months previously. Sturgeon said; "I don't think it would be surprising to anybody to hear me say of course I wish it wasn't there - but it is what it is and it will take its own course", and insisted, "In the meantime I'm getting on with my life." Responding to Sturgeon's comments, a Crown Office spokesman said that the service would review submissions from the police and would make a decision on "next steps", and insisted that; "All Scotland's prosecutors operate independently of political influence." A spokesman for Police Scotland said the force was awaiting direction from COPFS "on what further action should be taken".

=== 2025 ===
At the outset of 2025, two King's Counsels again raised concerns about the protracted nature of the investigation. Thomas Leonard Ross KC predicted that only Peter Murrell would face prosecution, and indicated that Murrell could have a defence under the European Convention on Human Rights if the case was not brought to trial in a reasonable time. Roddy Dunlop KC, Dean of the Faculty of Advocates and a former legal advisor to the Scottish Government, confirmed Ross' interpretation of the law but added; "What is a 'reasonable time' is fact-sensitive, and turns on the complexity of the matters in question. There is no fixed time limit as such." In response, the Crown Office and Procurator Fiscal Service issued a long statement confirming that it was continuing to review the standard prosecution report submitted by the police, concerning Murrell and activities said to have occurred between 2016 and 2023, and also confirmed that connected investigations into Colin Beattie and Nicola Sturgeon remained ongoing. The Crown Office said that before any action was taken, it would undertake a full evaluation that "will involve a thorough examination of the numerous witness statements and extensive evidence collected by police", and further maintained that its prosecutors operate independently and "are not influenced by political events."

On 13 January 2025, Nicola Sturgeon announced in a post on Instagram that she and Peter Murrell had separated and are to divorce. On 18 January, the Daily Record reported that an inhibition issued by the Court of Session forbids Murrell from selling property while he remains under investigation.

On 27 January, in an interview with STV News, Lord Carloway, the Lord President of the Court of Session, described how it is not possible to administer "instant justice" as a result of the need for due process and a trial, adding, "there's going to be a time lag when the evidence is gathered." Carloway was asked if this would explain the nearly-four-year investigation into the SNP finances. Lord Carloway responded clarifying: "I know absolutely nothing about Operation Branchform. I don't know where the hold up is, whether it’s with the police or the Crown Office or whatever." When asked for clarity on whether there was a hold up, Lord Carloway said: "Well it looks as if there is, yes" In response, a spokeswoman for Police Scotland said that the force had presented its findings to the Crown Office in August 2024, and were waiting for its decision. The Crown Office re-iterated that the investigation was ongoing and that comment would be inappropriate.

In February 2025, Nicola Sturgeon and Colin Beattie both passed internal party vetting to stand as SNP candidates in the 2026 Scottish Parliament election, despite still being under police investigation. Sturgeon said that she had yet to make a decision to stand for re-election in 2026. The First Minister and SNP leader John Swinney said that he was "comfortable" with the party's vetting procedures and said that the decision had been made through "due democratic processes". On 12 March 2025, Sturgeon announced that she would not seek re-election as an MSP and would stand down at the next Holyrood election.

==== Conclusion ====
Murrell appeared in court for the first time on 20 March 2025 charged with embezzlement. He was released on bail. At the same time, Police Scotland confirmed that its inquiries into Nicola Sturgeon and Colin Beattie had concluded and they were no longer under investigation. In an interview outside her home in Glasgow, Nicola Sturgeon said that there had never been "a scrap of evidence" against her: "I am completely in the clear, that is the outcome I would always have expected. I think it won't surprise anybody to hear me say that it's not been an easy experience, so to reach this point today it is obviously something I am relieved about." The First Minister and leader of the SNP, John Swinney, said that he was relieved that the investigation had concluded and described the SNP as an "alleged victim of embezzlement".

== Aftermath ==
=== Prosecution of Peter Murrell ===
Murrell appeared in court for the first time on 20 March 2025 charged with embezzlement. Full details of the charges were not made public. He did not enter a plea. He was released on bail pending his trial.

In July 2025 it was reported that the Scottish Legal Aid Board (SLAB) had approved an application by Murrell's lawyers for solemn legal aid. SLAB's decision prompted speculation as to Murrell's financial situation, and whether legal aid would be terminated if the SNP repaid the £60,000 still outstanding of his 2021 loan to the party. Former SNP MP and King's Counsel Joanna Cherry criticised the decision to award Murrell legal aid, saying on Twitter, "When I think of all the working class people I've represented over the years who have not qualified for legal aid or who have barely qualified with a big contribution required from their personal funds, I find this absolutely astonishing." Cherry further questioned why details of the allegations against Murrell had not been published, fourteen weeks after his initial charge: "I can't understand the delay in indicting Peter Murrell. It's way past time the detail of the charges against him were in the public domain... I'm interested in these details as the funds in question were raised from ordinary decent people who deserve to know what is alleged to have happened to their donations." Prosecution expenses for the case were reported to have more than doubled from £206,000 in February to £460,000 in July 2025.

A preliminary hearing on Murrell's case was to take place on 20 February at the High Court in the Justiciary Buildings in Glasgow. Murrell faced eight charges of embezzling a total of £460,000 from 2010 to 2023, including using party funds to illicitly buy a £124,550 camper van and other vehicles for his personal use, as well as separately buying luxury goods, cosmetics and jewellery. On 13 February 2026, the date of the hearing was postponed until 25 May 2026, after the 2026 Scottish Parliament election.

Murrell's prosecution led to renewed scrutiny over the dual role of the Lord Advocate: under Scots law, the Lord Advocate acts as both Scotland's chief prosecutor and the government's principal legal advisor, in which capacity they sit in the cabinet. In February 2026, the Lord Advocate, Dorothy Bain, was revealed to have briefed the First Minister John Swinney on the details of Murrell's charges nearly a year previously, in March 2025. It was previously thought that Bain had briefed the Scottish Government only in January 2026. The Crown Office insisted that this was in line with the Lord Advocate's duties, but opposition parties said that the Lord Advocate's cabinet position was incompatible with the impartiality and independence from political interference required of the chief prosecutor, and called for the role to be split.

At a High Court hearing on 25 May 2026, Murrell pleaded guilty to embezzling more than £400,000 from the Scottish National Party. He was remanded in custody prior to sentencing.

Following Murrell's guilty plea, the court published 125 pages of documents that detailed hundreds of purchases by Murrell over twelve years.

On 23 June, Murrell was sentenced to five years and three months in prison.

=== Impact on the Scottish National Party ===
The SNP experienced a fall in both membership and donations as a result of the investigation: in August 2023, the party's accounts showed that its reportable donations fell from £695,351 to £368,538. The party reported a deficit of £800,000. The party's membership fell from the 104,000 of 2021 to 72,000 in March 2023. The SNP's finances improved somewhat in 2024, achieving a surplus of £600,000, though its membership continued to fall from 74,889 in 2023 to 64,525 in 2024. Despite a £128,000 bequest boosting their 2024 general election campaign, the SNP's spending was minimal compared to other parties, with the party increasingly relying on membership fees over substantial donations. In November 2024, with Operation Branchform still ongoing, the SNP announced a plan to reduce permanent paid staff at its headquarters from twenty-six to sixteen, a reduction of more than a third, in order to "protect the long-term finances of the party" before the next Scottish Parliament election.

The SNP's 2024-25 accounts showed a deficit of £455,000, and a further fall in membership from 64,525 to 56,011. The motorhome seized by police as part of Operation Branchform was still listed as a party asset, with a depreciated value of £41,284. The accounts also showed that the SNP still owed Peter Murell £60,000 from his 2021 loan. Electoral Commission returns published in December 2025 showed that the SNP had received only one donation of £2,584 in the previous year and was highly reliant on public funding, which was attributed to continued uncertainty surrounding the party's finances owing to Operation Branchform.

Peter Murrell's guilty plea in May 2026 was met with shock and dismay from SNP figures: SNP leader and First Minister John Swinney described Murrell's actions as a "terrible breach of trust and an overwhelming betrayal by the man entrusted to be the party's chief executive", and said that he shared "the overwhelming anger felt by SNP members". Swinney insisted that the SNP had reformed its governance structures and party finances since Murrell's arrest. Murrell's estranged wife and former SNP leader Nicola Sturgeon said she was "angry, hurt, sad and very distressed about the impact of his actions on family, friends and the SNP", and insisted; "I had no knowledge or suspicion whatsoever that he was using SNP funds for personal purposes. I am utterly appalled that he did so and cannot begin to understand why.

SNP figures who had originally raised concerns surrounding the party's finances demanded a further investigation into the SNP's governance. Former MP Douglas Chapman, who had resigned as party treasurer in May 2021, said in a post on X, "When you circle the wagons, make sure you're protecting the right guys! SNP group think plus lack of self-awareness, political judgement and decency suggests there will be no apology from the party hierarchy — some of whom are now serving as MSPs/ministers." Former MP Joanna Cherry, who had resigned from the SNP's National Executive Committee in 2021 over lack of access to the party's finances, said; "I am angry and disgusted today. I am looking forward to justice being seen to be done to Mr Murrell but justice also has to be seen to done in relation to the people who actively covered up scrutiny of the party's finances." Cherry called for an independent inquiry into the actions of John Swinney, Nicola Sturgeon, party secretary Alex Kerr, and former SNP Business Convenor Kirsten Oswald, and accused Sturgeon of displaying a "remarkable lack of curiosity and deliberate frustration of the attempts of those of us who were curious". Roger Mullin, who served on the SNP NEC from 2020 to 2021, told The Times that Sturgeon, Murrell, and their allies had actively shut down scrutiny of the party's finances, and encouraged a culture where corruption could flourish in the absence of effective governance. Sean Clerkin, who made the initial complaint to Police Scotland, said, "I am feeling relief and vindication of what I alleged for a good number of years", and called for SNP members to receive a formal apology and compensation. Cynthia Guthrie and Allison Graham, who had resigned from the SNP Finance and Audit Committee in 2021, said that a lack of governance, curiosity, self-criticism, and structure in the SNP enabled Murrell's crimes, and called for a further inquiry. Former SNP Common Weal convenor Craig Berry, who resigned from the party in 2021, called for structural reforms to party governance and argued that the scandal could have been averted had internal critics been listened to: "The financial strain, cratering membership, and deep public distrust currently being felt are the direct consequences of a machine that chose to crush its own whistleblowers rather than face the truth."

On 3 June 2026, John Swinney admitted that the £667,000 "independence fighting fund", that had prompted the original Police Scotland investigation, had been spent on general party business. Swinney said that the fund, which had been expressly described as earmarked for a future independence referendum campaign, was spent on "ongoing activities of the Scottish National Party" as "the party that campaigns for independence."

=== Calls for further inquiries ===
Following Murrell's guilty plea, opposition parties and the Scottish media expressed incredulity that the party's leadership could have been unaware such extensive embezzlement. Questions were raised as to the length of time between the conclusion of the investigation and Murrell's prosecution, and why Murrell's hearing had been delayed until after the 2026 Scottish Parliament election. Scottish Labour deputy leader Jackie Baillie said; "It is inconceivable that Nicola Sturgeon knew nothing about the large-scale fraud, which she benefited from, taking place under her nose in both her party and her home. It was Nicola Sturgeon and the SNP party machine that attempted to close ranks and shut down scrutiny when questions about the finances started to emerge and we need to know why." Scottish Conservatives leader Russell Findlay described Sturgeon's claims of being unaware of Murrell's actions as "preposterous". Scottish Labour leader Anas Sarwar called for a parliamentary inquiry, citing concerns about the use of public funds, as well as the role of the Crown Office, Lord Advocate, police and Electoral Commission.

Questions remain over how and when the ring-fenced £667,000 referendum fund was spent. Former SNP Treasurer Douglas Chapman accused Nicola Sturgeon, John Swinney, and former SNP Westminster leader Ian Blackford of being "culpable" for "vilifying" and "diminishing" those who had raised concerns over financial transparency. Cynthia Guthrie and Allison Graham, who resigned from the SNP Finance and Audit Committee in 2021, expressed the belief that the leadership's desire to conceal the fact that the ring-fenced fund had already been spent further enabled Murrell's embezzlement. In June 2026, the pro-independence blogger Stuart Campbell, who has documented the SNP's finances on his website Wings Over Scotland since 2020, reported the party to the police for spending the ring-fenced fund on routine party activities. Speaking to the BBC's Scotcast on 29 June 2026, Campbell expressed his belief that the spending of the referendum fund constituted an act of fraud by the SNP against its supporters, separate to Murrell's embezzlement, that remains unresolved.

The Scottish Information Commissioner, David Hamilton, has highlighted contradictory statements by the police and Crown Office over which organisation was responsible for the decision to not charge individuals other than Murrell: the Crown Office has suggested that Police Scotland assessed that Sturgeon should not be charged, while the police have denied making any recommendation about charges. Detectives were reported to have wanted to ask Nicola Sturgeon further questions following her arrest and written statement but were never given the opportunity. Hamilton, who has also criticised the Scottish Government for a lack of transparency surrounding the Alex Salmond sexual harassment scandal, described both incidents as illustrative of a wider culture of institutional secrecy in opposition to the public interest.

The SNP leadership has rejected calls for an independent inquiry into the actions of the party, Police Scotland, and the Crown Office during the Operation Branchform investigation, maintaining that the police investigation was sufficient and that the SNP has reformed its internal governance. John Swinney and Nicola Sturgeon have continued to insist that Murrell was exclusively responsible for embezzlement and that they never suspected that he was involved in wrongdoing. On 10 June 2026, the Scottish National Party and Scottish Greens voted to reject a motion in the Scottish Parliament for an inquiry, instead backing a motion introduced by Greens co-leader Ross Greer to examine political party financing more generally.

On 10 July 2026, Stuart Campbell announced that he had sought legal advice for a group civil action against the SNP over the spending of the ring-fenced funds. Legal advice provided to Campbell by Roddy Dunlop KC, Dean of the Faculty of Advocates, concluded that a "civil claim for fraudulent breach of trust is close to irresistible" and that donors were "entitled to repayment". The SNP subsequently offered donors refunds upon request.

On 16 July 2026, Sir David Davis MP used parliamentary privilege to accuse Nicola Sturgeon of enabling Peter Murrell's embezzlement from the SNP, and expressed his disbelief that Sturgeon could have been unaware of her husband's purchases. Davis linked Operation Branchform to the misconduct allegations against former SNP leader Alex Salmond, which he has used parliamentary privilege to criticise in the past, and claimed that Sturgeon and Murrell pursued Salmond over sexual misconduct claims as part of an effort to "hide their own crimes". Through her lawyer Aamer Anwar, Sturgeon accused Davis of abusing parliamentary privilege to spread "conspiracy theories" and "lies".

On 20 August 2026, Stuart Campbell, acting through the law firm Halliday Campbell, sent a Letter Before Action to Police Scotland declaring his intent to seek a judicial review through the Court of Session over its refusal to re-examine whether further crimes were committed in relation to the disappearance of the £667,000 referendum fund. Campbell accused Police Scotland of irrationality in failing to pursue "clear evidence" of the diversion of trust funds, of failure to provide "proper, intelligible and adequate reasons for declining to investigate", and of failing to recognise independent legal analysis, public interest in the case, and the risk to public confidence in the independence of Scottish policing. Campbell successfully crowdfunded £30,000 within three days to support a judicial review application, with Roddy Dunlop KC offering his services to the case pro bono.

=== Scottish Affairs Select Committee inquiry ===
Following the rejection of an inquiry by Holyrood, there were calls for Westminster to launch its own investigation. Former First Minister Lord McConnell called for a joint inquiry by Westminster's Public Accounts Committee and Holyrood's Public Audit Committee. Work and Pensions Secretary Pat McFadden and Conservative Shadow Home Secretary Chris Philp both backed an investigation.

In summer 2026, the Scottish Affairs Select Committee of the House of Commons approached Holyrood to explore the possibility of a joint inquiry by the two parliaments into political party funding. The Scottish Parliament's Finance, Public Audit, and Standards, Procedures and Public Appointments Committees all declined the Select Committee's invitation to cooperate, arguing that the issues raised did not fall within their remits.

On 9 September, the Scottish Affairs Select Committee announced that it would launch an investigation into the financing of political parties in Scotland. The committee's chair, Patricia Ferguson MP, said that the inquiry would examine the Electoral Commission's "oversight of the funding and governance of political parties in Scotland, and the policies, processes and safeguards associated with the distribution of Short Money." The committee also announced a separate investigation into the dual role of the Lord Advocate, with Ferguson saying, "The handling of Operation Branchform has once again brought to the fore the challenges this dual role can present. It's right that the appropriateness of the Lord Advocate's dual role is properly considered, and we'll explore the of the advantages and disadvantages of the current arrangement, and possible options for reform."

=== Impact on political perceptions ===
An analysis by the Scottish Election Study published in May 2025 found that the investigation into SNP finances had lowered trust in Scottish government ministers and civil servants among those who opposed Scottish independence. Among those who supported independence, the study found no significant change in perceptions on Scottish institutions.

== In popular culture ==
In August 2026, Channel 5 announced plans for a ninety-minute television drama inspired by Operation Branchform. Entitled To Nicola, Love Peter, the drama was described by Channel 5 as "an epic tale of Shakespearean proportions – an extraordinary tale of power, envy, deception and greed." Ben Frow, chief content officer at 5, said, "We will be pulling together the events and characters involved to create a compelling revealing drama, as well as answering that very important question – why would anyone pay £2,600 for a pair of salt and pepper grinders?" Bafta-nominated director Misha Manson-Smith is to direct the project, with scriptwriting by Lucy Brydon.

== See also ==
- 2023 Scottish National Party leadership election
