= HM Advocate v Murrell =

Scottish criminal court case

- Court: High Court of Justiciary
- Full case name: His Majesty's Advocate v Peter Murrell
- Decided: 25 May 2026

Court membership
- Judge sitting: The Lord Young

His Majesty's Advocate v Peter Murrell was a criminal court case involving Peter Murrell, former chief executive of the Scottish National Party (SNP), and estranged husband of Nicola Sturgeon. Murrell was accused of embezzling £459,000 from the SNP, to pay for expensive vehicles and other luxury goods for himself.

Murrell appeared at Edinburgh High Court of Justiciary on 25 May 2026 and pleaded guilty to embezzling more than £400,000 from the party. He was remanded in custody and was sentenced to five years and three months in prison on 23 June 2026. The sentence was backdated to 25 May 2026.

== Background ==
Peter Murrell was chief executive officer of the SNP from 2001 to 2023. In 2010, he married Nicola Sturgeon, then the party's depute leader, who was SNP leader and First Minister of Scotland from 2014 to 2023.

From July 2021 until March 2025, the SNP was subject to a Police Scotland investigation codenamed Operation Branchform, after allegations were made that £666,953 raised by the SNP since 2017 specifically to campaign in a proposed second Scottish independence referendum was in part improperly spent on other activities. In the course of the investigation, Murrell and Sturgeon's home and SNP headquarters were searched, and Murrell, Sturgeon, and the SNP's treasurer Colin Beattie were arrested and questioned by police.

In March 2025, Police Scotland concluded their investigations into Sturgeon and Beattie, with no charges being filed against them. Murrell was charged with embezzlement and appeared in court for the first time on 20 March 2025.

== Charges ==
In February 2026, it was reported that Murrell faces eight charges of embezzling a total of £460,000 from August 2010 to June 2023, including using party funds to buy a £124,550 campervan and other vehicles for his personal use, as well as buying luxury goods, cosmetics and jewellery. On 13 February 2026, the date of the hearing was postponed until 25 May 2026, after the 2026 Scottish Parliament election.

Murrell was initially accused of embezzling £459,046.49 between 12 August 2010 and 13 January 2023. On 25 May 2026, it was confirmed at the High Court hearing that the total sum had been cut to £400,310.65, with the period of offending also reduced by three months.

Following Murrell's guilty plea, the court published 125 pages of documents fully detailing Murrell's purchases. The largest single transaction was £124,550 for a luxury motorhome, paid for in 2020 entirely with party funds. Murrell was accused of creating false documents to disguise the payment as a legitimate party expense. The motorhome was seized by police in 2023 as part of the Operation Branchform investigation. His first major purchase, a £33,000 Volkswagen Golf, was made in early 2016 using £16,489 of SNP money. He also used £57,500 of party cash to buy a Jaguar I-Pace car in 2019, and sold it for £47,378.76 two years later. Murrell also used SNP funds for extensive purchases of luxury items, including two Bremont watches for a total of £9,350, a £4,225 Starwalker World Time fountain pen, a £3,500 Hamilton & Inches silver wine coaster, and a £150 Folio Society edition of Hannah Arendt's The Origins of Totalitarianism.

== Verdict ==
At a hearing at the High Court on 25 May 2026, Peter Murrell pleaded guilty to embezzlement, and admitted to embezzling a total of £400,310.65 from the Scottish National Party between 12 August 2010 and 19 October 2022. The presiding judge, Lord Young, accused Murrell of committing "a gross breach of trust", and ordered him to be remanded in custody prior to sentencing on 23 June.

== Reactions ==
Murrell's guilty plea was met with shock and dismay from Scottish National Party figures, as well as incredulity from the media and opposition parties that the party's leadership could have been unaware such extensive embezzlement. SNP leader and First Minister of Scotland John Swinney described Murrell's actions as a "terrible breach of trust and an overwhelming betrayal by the man entrusted to be the party's chief executive", and said that he shared "the overwhelming anger felt by SNP members". Swinney insisted that the SNP had reformed its governance structures and party finances since Murrell's arrest. Former SNP leader and estranged wife of Peter Murrell Nicola Sturgeon said she was "angry, hurt, sad and very distressed about the impact of his actions on family, friends and the SNP", and insisted; "I had no knowledge or suspicion whatsoever that he was using SNP funds for personal purposes. I am utterly appalled that he did so and cannot begin to understand why."

Both the Scottish media and opposition politicians expressed doubt that Murrell's extensive purchases of luxury items could have gone unnoticed by Sturgeon or the party leadership, and questioned why Murrell's hearing had been delayed until after the 2026 Scottish Parliament election. Scottish Labour deputy leader Jackie Baillie said; "It is inconceivable that Nicola Sturgeon knew nothing about the large-scale fraud, which she benefited from, taking place under her nose in both her party and her home. It was Nicola Sturgeon and the SNP party machine that attempted to close ranks and shut down scrutiny when questions about the finances started to emerge and we need to know why." Scottish Conservatives leader Russell Findlay described Sturgeon's claims of being unaware of Murrell's action as "preposterous". Former SNP MP Joanna Cherry, who had resigned from the party's National Executive Committee in 2021 over lack of access to the party's finances, said that Sturgeon had displayed a "remarkable lack of curiosity and deliberate frustration of the attempts of those of us who were curious", and called for an independent inquiry. The Prime Minister, Sir Keir Starmer, said that; "anybody looking at what's happening up in Scotland will be baffled that those at the top of the SNP say they didn't know anything about what was going on".
