= James Dornan =

Scottish National Party politician (born 1953)

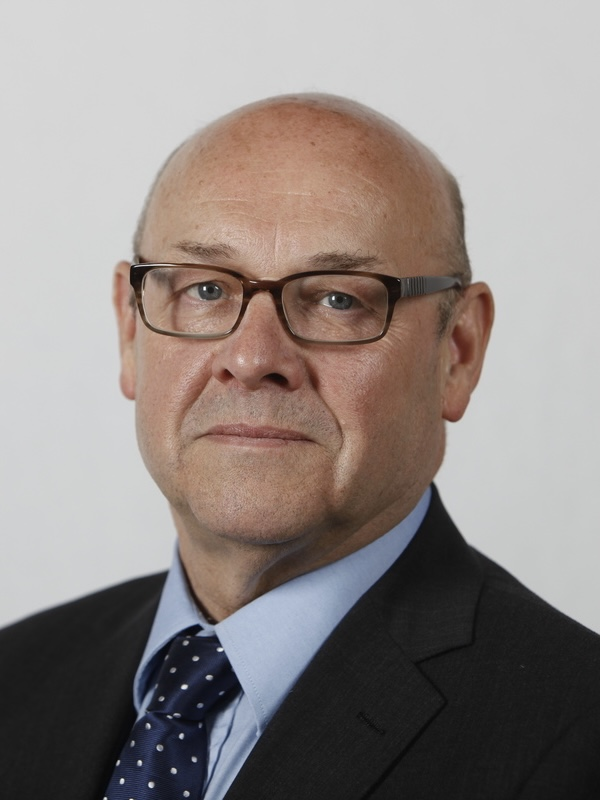

Member of the Scottish Parliament for Glasgow Cathcart
- In office 5 May 2011 – 9 April 2026
- Preceded by: Charlie Gordon
- Succeeded by: Constituency abolished

Personal details
- Born: 17 March 1953 (age 73) Glasgow, Scotland
- Party: Scottish National Party
- Website: Official biography at The Scottish Parliament's website

James Dornan (born 17 March 1953) is a Scottish National Party (SNP) politician who served as Member of the Scottish Parliament (MSP) for Glasgow Cathcart from 2011 to 2026.

== Early life ==
James Dornan was raised in the Oatlands neighbourhood of southern Glasgow.

In 1968 at the age of fifteen, Dornan was involved in a fighting incident with three other boys. One was severely injured, which led to Dornan briefly being charged with attempted murder. Dornan's charge was later reduced to common assault and he received a £15 fine and two years' probation. Dornan did not speak publicly about the incident for fifty-seven years until he was encouraged to come forward in 2025 by the social impact of the TV series Adolescence. Dornan said; "When you're a young man, you do things without thinking of the repercussions and then the repercussions just expand, and everyone is caught up in it." Dornan said he still felt responsible for the incident.

Dornan joined the Scottish National Party in 1996 and previously worked for Stewart Maxwell (MSP).

== Political career ==
He was elected in the 2011 Parliamentary elections, having previously contested the Ayr Constituency in the 2003 Scottish Parliament elections and the Glasgow South-West Constituency in the 2005 UK general election before his election in 2011. He was also selected to be the SNP candidate in the 2009 Glasgow North East by-election, but decided to step aside after it was reported that he may have breached charity law by acting as an "unpaid" partner-director of Culture and Sport Glasgow while he was covered by a protected trust deed – an arrangement which avoids a court-ordered bankruptcy.

He represented the Langside ward on Glasgow City Council from 3 May 2007 until 3 May 2012 and was the SNP group leader on the council until June 2011, when he was succeeded by Councillor Allison Hunter.

In 2012, Dornan was appointed as a SNP Depute Whip.

On 25 February 2020, Dornan announced he would not be standing at the 2021 Scottish Parliament election. However, in July 2020, he reversed his decision and announced that he would put himself forward again for election. Later in July 2020, the SNP National Executive Committee voted have an all-woman shortlist for the Glasgow Cathcart Scottish Parliamentary constituency, ending his bid of standing for the seat again. However, after the decision, Dornan announced that he would challenge the decision. The SNP National Secretary then reversed the all-woman shortlist and Dornan was permitted to stand. Dornan was selected to stand for the SNP in the Glasgow Cathcart Scottish Parliamentary constituency and held the seat with 57% of the vote.

On 10 August 2023, he announced he would stand down at the 2026 Scottish Parliament election.

== Political positions ==
Dornan believes in Scottish independence and often appeared on Russian network RT to champion the cause.

== Controversies ==
=== Homophobic abuse of Ross Thomson ===
In May 2019, Dornan was accused of homophobia after using the word 'fag' to describe a gay Conservative MP, Ross Thomson. The Scottish Conservatives complained that "Dornan has form when it comes to making crass and offensive remarks" and he apologised for his use of language.

=== False accusations of sectarianism against Lothian Buses ===
In June 2021 Dornan accused Lothian Buses of sectarianism after they cancelled scheduled services on St Patrick's Day. In fact, the bus company's services had been suspended because of anti-social behaviour. Conservative MSP Sue Webber described the remarks as "completely false and poisonous" and urged him to apologise. After pressure from SNP councillors in Edinburgh, Dornan apologised privately to the bus company for his mistake.

=== Abuse of Jacob Rees-Mogg ===
In July 2021 Dornan was reported to the Ethical Standards Commissioner after commenting on a post by Conservative cabinet minister, Jacob Rees-Mogg. Rees-Mogg, a practising Catholic, had tweeted about his visit to the Border Force National Command Centre and the British Government's Nationality and Borders Bill. In response Dornan tweeted:

Hope you remember this the next time you go to confession. You and your cronies are already responsible for the deaths of thousands and you’re now happy to see the most desperate people in the world suffer and drown. If your god exists you will undoubtedly rot in hell.

The SNP later apologised to Rees-Mogg, who said it was "most gracious", adding:

But I think this SNP MSP is entitled to discuss the likely prospects of my immortal soul. It’s quite interesting that you're getting the discussion of hell in public life. I think that is theologically interesting concept and I'm glad he takes such an orthodox, Catholic view of the reality of that and that is encouraging.

=== Abuse of BBC journalist ===
In February 2022 BBC journalist Sarah Smith said she was relieved to have escaped the "bile, hatred and misogyny" she had endured covering Scottish politics, having moved to Washington to serve as the BBC's North America Editor. She recounted one instance in which someone shouted at her from their car, "What f***ing lies you're going to be telling on TV tonight, you f***ing lying bitch?" Dornan tweeted "America would be the go to place to escape all her imaginary woes then." The comment was widely condemned by his political opponents and Dornan later tweeted an apology, "for my earlier comments that made it seem as though I believed the abuse Sarah Smith has suffered was imaginary". Conservative MSP Russell Findlay, a former crime reporter who had acid thrown at his face by a gangster, accused Dornan of "gaslighting" Smith and warned, "Cowardly attacks on journalists by the lunatic brigade in Scotland have become increasingly toxic since 2014. There's a risk that personal abuse escalates and that someone will get hurt."

=== Criticism of Operation Branchform ===
Dornan has made a series of comments criticising Operation Branchform, the Police Scotland investigation into alleged fundraising fraud in the SNP. Following the arrest of Nicola Sturgeon's husband Peter Murrell in 2023 and a police search of Sturgeon and Murrel's private home, Dornan accused the police and media of having "some kind of collusion about making sure the media are in attendance when the slightest thing happens". He described the search of the Sturgeon-Murrell home as "like Fred West's house". Police Scotland denied any suggestion that the media was informed of the search ahead of time.

In 2024, after Chief Constable of Police Scotland Jo Farrell confirmed that Operation Branchform was still ongoing and was unable to offer an end date to the investigation, Dornan shared the post on Twitter and wrote: "I have May 2026 in the draw." As the next Holyrood elections were due to be held on 7 May 2026, Dornan's comments were interpreted by many as implying that the police investigation was politically-motivated. Dornan further denounced the investigation as a "farce" in conversation with other Twitter users: "The minute we're seen to even attempt to interfere in police business we would, rightly, be slaughtered. The whole thing is a farce imo [in my opinion] and there are questions for the police to answer but we need to keep our distance... I don't think it's affecting party members much, they see it for what I see it, but it does allow others to use it as a weapon whilst pretending they care about truth and honesty."

=== Support of Kneecap ===
In May 2025, Dornan offered his support to the controversial Irish rap group Kneecap after it was removed from the TRNSMT musical festival in Glasgow. Kneecap, whose members had previously advocated for the murder of Conservative MPs, was removed from the festival's line-up after a member of the group was charged with a terror offence for allegedly displaying a flag in support of proscribed organisation Hezbollah. Police Scotland warned that allowing the group to continue to perform at the festival would require "a significant policing operation". Dornan said; "I'm truly concerned by the police statement that Kneecap should not play at TRNSMT because they can’t guarantee their safety. Who exactly is threatening them? Israel? Supporters of genocide? Anti Irish protesters? Who exactly? This is an extremely worrying decision." A Police Scotland spokesman said; "Any decision on the line up at TRNSMT is for the organisers and there was no prior consultation with Police Scotland before acts were booked. Officers have highlighted the potential reaction of such a large audience to this band would require a significant policing operation in order to support the delivery of a safe event."
