= 2003 Glasgow City Council election =

2003 Scottish local government election

- 1 May 2003

All 80 seats to Glasgow City Council 41 seats needed for a majority
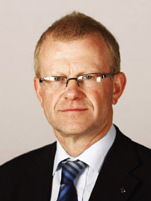
	First party	Second party	Third party
Leader	Charlie Gordon	John Mason	Christopher Mason
Party	Labour	SNP	Liberal Democrats
Leader's seat	Knightswood Park	Garrowhill	Jordanhill
Last election	74 seats, 49.6%	2 seats, 29.7%	1 seat, 5.6%
Seats won	71	4	3
Seat change	▼4	▲2	▲2
Popular vote	87,311	37,570	13.886
Percentage	47.7%	20.5%	7.6%
Swing	▼1.9%	▼9.2%	▲2.0%
	Fourth party	Fifth party
Leader	Keith Baldassara	Alan J Rodger
Party	Scottish Socialist	Conservative
Leader's seat	Pollok	Maxwell Park
Last election	1 seat, 7.3%	1 seat, 7.4%
Seats won	1	1
Seat change	0	0
Popular vote	28,485	13,755
Percentage	15.5%	7.5%
Swing	▲8.2%	▲0.1%
- Colours indicate winners in each ward Labour Liberal Democrat SNP Independent Conservative SSP
Council Leader before election
Charlie Gordon
Labour
Council Leader after election
Charlie Gordon
Scottish Labour Party

Elections to Glasgow City Council were held on 1 May 2003, the same day as the other Scottish local government elections and the Scottish Parliament general election.

== Election results ==
2003 Glasgow City Council election result
Party	Seats	Gains	Losses	Net gain/loss	Seats %	Votes %	Votes	+/−
Labour	71				89.9	47.7	87,311	-1.9
SNP	4				5.1	20.5	37,570	-9.2
Liberal Democrats	3				3.8	7.6	13,886	+2.0
Scottish Socialist	1				1.3	15.5	28,485	+8.2
Conservative	1				1.3	7.5	13,755	+0.1
Independent	0				0.0	1.2	2,201	New

== Results by Ward (A-Z) ==
An asterisk (*) indicates an incumbent candidate.

Two asterisks (**) indicates an incumbent candidate standing for re-election in a different ward.

Anderston
Party	Candidate	Votes	%	±%
Labour	Alexander Mosson*	948	52.3	+1.3
Scottish Socialist	Henry Brown	310	17.1	+9.8
SNP	Margaret Brown	281	15.5	−9.7
Liberal Democrats	James Thom	190	10.5	+0.1
Conservative	Alexander Kelly	83	4.6	−1.6
Majority		638	35.2	+9.3
Turnout		1812	28.2	−9.5
Labour hold		Swing		

Anniesland
Party	Candidate	Votes	%	±%
Labour	Jonathan Findlay	1,251	43.2	−3.4
SNP	Robert Scott	555	19.2	−8.6
Liberal Democrats	Robert Brown	401	13.8	+4.1
Conservative	Gary Cornes	364	12.6	+0.9
Scottish Socialist	Joseph Maguire	327	11.3	+7.1
Majority		696	24.0	+5.3
Turnout		2898	45.4	−8.3
Labour hold		Swing		

Ashfield
Party	Candidate	Votes	%	±%
Labour	Ellen Hurcombe*	1,213	58.2	+2.7
SNP	Crawford Steele	366	17.6	−20.7
Scottish Socialist	Charles McCormick	301	14.4	+8.2
Independent	Brian Brown	123	5.9	N/A
Liberal Democrats	Anne Good	82	3.9	N/A
Majority		847	40.6	+23.5
Turnout		2085	33.7	−8.3
Labour hold		Swing		

Baillieston
Party	Candidate	Votes	%	±%
Labour	Robert MacBean*	1,423	54.9	+2.5
SNP	Victoria Matfield	625	24.1	−11.4
Scottish Socialist	James McVicar	544	21.0	+8.9
Majority		798	30.8	+13.9
Turnout		2592	42.0	−8.0
Labour hold		Swing		

Barlanark
Party	Candidate	Votes	%	±%
Labour	James Coleman*	937	62.3	+2.0
SNP	Robert Mitchell	288	19.2	−9.8
Scottish Socialist	Francis McQuaid	278	18.5	+7.8
Majority		649	43.1	+11.7
Turnout		1503	26.6	−10.8
Labour hold		Swing		

Battlefield
Party	Candidate	Votes	%	±%
Labour	Margaret McCafferty*	916	33.7	−13.3
SNP	Andrew Bennet	605	22.3	−9.1
Scottish Socialist	Gary Kelly	500	18.4	+8.5
Liberal Democrats	Angela Nixon	353	13.0	N/A
Conservative	Kenneth Ross	345	12.7	+1.0
Majority		311	11.4	−4.1
Turnout		2721	42.0	−6.8
Labour hold		Swing		

Blairdardie
Party	Candidate	Votes	%	±%
Labour	Steven Purcell*	1,782	62.7	+3.3
SNP	Calum Smith	433	15.2	−10.1
Scottish Socialist	Michael Dyer	285	10.0	+5.2
Conservative	Alfred Smith	214	7.5	−1.7
Liberal Democrats	Christopher McGinty	129	4.5	N/A
Majority		1349	47.5	+13.4
Turnout		2843	45.5	−12.4
Labour hold		Swing		

Braidfauld
Party	Candidate	Votes	%	±%
Labour	Susan Baird*	1,115	65.4	+3.8
SNP	Paul Martin	340	19.9	−8.5
Scottish Socialist	Paul Gormley	251	14.7	+4.7
Majority		775	45.5	+12.3
Turnout		1706	28.2	−8.7
Labour hold		Swing		

Bridgeton/Dalmarnock
Party	Candidate	Votes	%	±%
Labour	George Redmond*	1,057	73.5	+6.4
SNP	Arthur Shearer	239	16.6	−7.3
Scottish Socialist	Michael Paley	142	9.9	+5.4
Majority		818	56.9	+13.7
Turnout		1438	23.2	−11.4
Labour hold		Swing		

Calton
Party	Candidate	Votes	%	±%
Labour	David Stevenson*	1,013	59.3	+6.5
SNP	Rudi Birkner	408	23.9	−7.9
Scottish Socialist	Jan-Marie Markwick	286	16.8	+8.7
Majority		605	35.4	+14.5
Turnout		1707	28.9	−5.8
Labour hold		Swing		

Cardonald
Party	Candidate	Votes	%	±%
Labour	Margaret Sinclair	1,146	37.3	−8.1
Scottish Socialist	Gail Sheridan	825	26.9	+15.3
SNP	John McFarlane	613	20.0	−8.0
Conservative	Archie McIntyre	245	8.0	+−0.0
Liberal Democrats	Isabella Nelson	242	7.9	+0.8
Majority		321	10.4	−6.9
Turnout		3071	52.3	−10.5
Labour hold		Swing		

Carmunnock
Party	Candidate	Votes	%	±%
Labour	Alan Stewart*	1,566	54.0	+6.6
SNP	Andrew Kidd	528	18.2	−11.8
Conservative	George Carr	477	16.4	−1.0
Scottish Socialist	Christine Biggar	331	11.4	+6.2
Majority		1038	35.8	+18.4
Turnout		2902	48.3	−6.4
Labour hold		Swing		

Carntyne
Party	Candidate	Votes	%	±%
Labour	Patricia Chalmers*	1,274	58.7	+1.5
SNP	David Iredale	391	18.0	−14.4
Scottish Socialist	Hilary Johnston	286	13.2	N/A
Conservative	Dorothy Luckhurst	218	10.1	−0.3
Majority		883	40.7	+16.0
Turnout		2169	33.5	−8.0
Labour hold		Swing		

Carnwadric
Party	Candidate	Votes	%	±%
Labour	Josephine Dodds*	1,185	49.0	−6.6
Scottish Socialist	Gordon Wishart	557	23.0	+11.1
SNP	Brian Greene	453	18.7	−13.7
Conservative	Patricia McIntyre	225	9.3	N/A
Majority		628	26.0	+2.8
Turnout		2420	38.4	−8.8
Labour hold		Swing		

Castlemilk
Party	Candidate	Votes	%	±%
Labour	John McKenzie*	1,434	63.4	+0.9
SNP	Anne McLaughlin	376	16.6	−8.3
Scottish Socialist	John McArthur	289	12.8	+6.5
Conservative	Marion Kilpatrick	163	7.2	+0.8
Majority		1058	46.8	+9.2
Turnout		2262	40.2	−8.3
Labour hold		Swing		

Cathcart
Party	Candidate	Votes	%	±%
Labour	Malcolm McLean*	1,126	34.0	−0.8
Conservative	John Crawford	822	24.8	+3.4
SNP	David Ritchie	520	15.7	−5.3
Scottish Socialist	Ian Gidley	495	15.0	N/A
Liberal Democrats	Ian Gilliland	347	10.5	−12.3
Majority		304	9.2	−2.8
Turnout		3310	51.8	−7.7
Labour hold		Swing		

Cowlairs
Party	Candidate	Votes	%	±%
Labour	Allan Stewart*	925	61.0	+5.2
SNP	John McLaughlin	375	24.7	−6.3
Scottish Socialist	Norman Bean	217	14.3	+7.6
Majority		550	36.3	+11.6
Turnout		1517	24.6	−10.5
Labour hold		Swing		

Crookston
Party	Candidate	Votes	%	±%
Labour	William O'Rourke*	1,291	49.4	−4.8
Scottish Socialist	George McNeillage	752	28.8	+6.4
SNP	Gavin Greene	337	12.9	−10.5
Conservative	Christopher Bradshaw	141	5.4	N/A
Liberal Democrats	Penelope Vere	91	3.6	N/A
Majority		539	20.6	−10.2
Turnout		2612	40.7	−9.9
Labour hold		Swing		

Darnley
Party	Candidate	Votes	%	±%
Labour	Michael Kernaghan*	1,094	50.6	+2.6
SNP	Neil McDonagh	525	24.3	−12.7
Scottish Socialist	Margaret McCann	347	16.1	+9.4
Conservative	Mohammad Anjum	194	9.0	+0.7
Majority		569	26.3	+15.3
Turnout		2160	35.5	−7.3
Labour hold		Swing		

Dennistoun
Party	Candidate	Votes	%	±%
Labour	Francis Doherty	1,139	54.2	+5.0
SNP	David Johnston	517	24.6	−9.6
Scottish Socialist	Javed Anwar	447	21.3	+12.2
Majority		622	29.6	+14.5
Turnout		2103	33.1	−12.3
Labour hold		Swing		

Drumoyne
Party	Candidate	Votes	%	±%
Labour	Stephen Dornan*	1,436	58.7	+0.3
SNP	Jeanett Hutcheson	537	21.9	−8.8
Scottish Socialist	Fiona Graham	340	13.9	+7.0
Conservative	Sheila Henderson	135	5.5	+1.5
Majority		899	36.8	+9.2
Turnout		2448	40.2	−9.7
Labour hold		Swing		

Drumry
Party	Candidate	Votes	%	±%
Labour	Marjorie O'Neill*	783	55.0	−4.7
Scottish Socialist	Norman MacLeod	226	15.9	+4.3
SNP	Sarah Nicholson	214	15.0	−8.6
Independent	Robert Howie	124	8.7	N/A
Liberal Democrats	Marjory Watt	40	2.8	N/A
Conservative	Marion Cornes	36	2.5	−2.5
Majority		557	39.1	+3.0
Turnout		1423	25.7	−10.8
Labour hold		Swing		

Easterhouse
Party	Candidate	Votes	%	±%
Labour	Ronald Quinn*	854	59.6	+4.2
SNP	James Williamson	303	21.1	−4.6
Scottish Socialist	Christine McVicar	277	19.3	+0.4
Majority		551	38.5	+8.8
Turnout		1434	26.0	−9.5
Labour hold		Swing		

Firhill
Party	Candidate	Votes	%	±%
Labour	Haleema Malik	799	39.1	+1.3
SNP	Jim Hepburn	480	23.5	−8.4
Liberal Democrats	John Stuart	347	17.0	+2.2
Scottish Socialist	Paul Stewart	290	14.2	+6.5
Conservative	Alix Campbell	127	6.2	−1.5
Majority		319	15.6	+9.6
Turnout		2043	30.7	−10.4
Labour hold		Swing		

Garrowhill
Party	Candidate	Votes	%	±%
SNP	John Mason*	1,331	42.5	−2.0
Labour	Douglas Hay	1140	36.4	−3.9
Scottish Socialist	Omar Ibrahim	227	7.2	+4.7
Conservative	Paul Spencer	220	7.0	−1.8
Liberal Democrats	David Jackson	214	6.8	+2.8
Majority		191	6.1	+1.9
Turnout		3132	49.0	−10.2
SNP hold		Swing		

Gartcraig
Party	Candidate	Votes	%	±%
Labour	Gerald Leonard*	1,419	63.4	+3.9
SNP	Joerg Macthearlaich-Wiench	360	16.1	−13.9
Scottish Socialist	Gerard Cairns	275	12.3	N/A
Conservative	Randle Wilson	185	8.3	−2.2
Majority		1059	47.3	+17.8
Turnout		2239	39.9	−11.6
Labour hold		Swing		

Garthamlock
Party	Candidate	Votes	%	±%
Labour	Catherine McMaster*	1,083	62.4	+6.3
SNP	Hugh Harkins	463	26.7	−3.5
Scottish Socialist	George Savage	190	10.9	−2.7
Majority		620	35.7	+9.8
Turnout		1736	30.9	−10.5
Labour hold		Swing		

Glenwood
Party	Candidate	Votes	%	±%
Labour	Christine Devine*	946	61.0	+1.7
Scottish Socialist	Francis Young	278	17.9	+6.2
SNP	Margaret Greene	226	14.6	−14.5
Conservative	Alastair Mackenzie	102	6.6	N/A
Majority		668	43.1	+12.9
Turnout		1552	26.5	−8.4
Labour hold		Swing		

Govan
Party	Candidate	Votes	%	±%
Labour	John Flanagan*	1,260	54.5	+5.1
SNP	William Ward	432	18.7	−15.9
Scottish Socialist	Carolina Perez	388	16.8	+7.1
Conservative	Harriet Murdoch	145	6.3	+1.0
Liberal Democrats	Kieran McQuaid	88	3.8	N/A
Majority		828	35.8	+21.1
Turnout		2313	35.0	−9.9
Labour hold		Swing		

== By-elections since 3 May 2007 ==
=== 2006 by-election ===
- Milton ward: SNP gain from Labour (councillor William McAllister elected).
