= Pat Lally (politician) =

Scottish politician (1926–2018)

Patrick James Lally (February 1926 – 8 June 2018) was a Scottish politician who was Leader of Glasgow City Council and Lord Provost of Glasgow.

== Early years ==
Pat Lally was born and brought up in the Gorbals, a poor district of Glasgow. He left school at 13, and was conscripted to the RAF after the War. He joined the Labour Party in 1950 and was elected as a Glasgow Corporation councillor in 1966.

== City of Glasgow Corporation/City of Glasgow District Council/Glasgow City Council (1966–1999) ==
Lally was involved in local government politics from 1966 to 1999. Although he was suspended from Labour's candidates list in 1977 in a housing allocation row, he returned to the City Chambers in 1980. He was council leader of Glasgow City District Council in the early 1990s and became Lord Provost of the new Glasgow City Council in 1996 following local government reorganisation in Scotland, serving until 1999. During this time he did much to promote Glasgow on the national and international stage. He was credited as the driving force behind civic successes such as the 1988 Glasgow Garden Festival, Glasgow becoming European City of Culture in 1990, and European City of Architecture in 1999. He also played an important role in the creation of the Glasgow Royal Concert Hall, which is sometimes dubbed 'Lally's Palais'.

In 1997 he and Alex Mosson were suspended by the Labour party in a "votes for trips" scandal. Both took the party to the Court of Session and had the suspension revoked. Lally retired from local government in 1999, with one of his last public duties as Lord Provost being the opening of the Buchanan Galleries shopping mall which had been an integral part of the Concert Hall scheme he had presided over in the late 1980s.

Pat Lally is nicknamed 'Lazarus', as a result of his numerous political comebacks.

== Retirement ==
He quit the Labour Party in 2003, but later that year stood at the age of 77 against Mike Watson in Glasgow Cathcart to be an MSP as a health campaign candidate, and stood again to be an MSP in the October 2005 by-election, against ex-council leader Charlie Gordon, as an independent for the same constituency.

Lally stood as a candidate for the Scottish Senior Citizens Unity Party in the 2007 Scottish Parliament election on the Glasgow list. His wife, Peggy, died on polling day, 3 May. Pat died on 8 June 2018, aged 92.

== Autobiography ==
Pat Lally with Neil Baxter: Lazarus Only Done it Once: The Story of My Lives, London, HarperCollins, 2000

Political offices
Unknown	Leader, Glasgow Council; 1986–1992	Succeeded by Jean McFadden
Preceded by Jean McFadden	Leader, Glasgow Council; 1994–1996	Succeeded by Jean McFadden
Preceded by Tommy Dingwall	Lord Provost of Glasgow; 1996–1999	Succeeded by Alex Mosson
