= Chloe Stewart =

Chloe Stewart may refer to:

- Chloe Stewart, original name for Miley Stewart, fictional character
- Chloe Stewart, candidate for Glasgow Cathcart (Scottish Parliament constituency)
