= Alex Mosson =

Alexander Francis Mosson (born 27 August 1940) is a Scottish Labour Party politician and a former Lord Provost of Glasgow. He has also represented Anderston as a councillor and served as an official of the Transport and General Workers' Union.

== Political career ==
Mosson served prison sentences in the 1960s for housebreaking, shoplifting and assault, which he attributed to being an alcoholic at the time; an affliction he later overcame. He was first elected as a Glasgow councillor for Anderston in 1984. He was elected Lord Provost in 1999, replacing Pat Lally. He was succeeded in 2003 by Liz Cameron.

Mosson was associated with many notable events during his time as Lord Provost. These included: the UEFA Champions League Final between Real Madrid and Bayer Leverkusen at Hampden Park in 2002, the twinning of the city with Havana and the promotion of the £500,000,000 Glasgow Harbour Development.

As Lord Lieutenant of the City of Glasgow, the Lord Provost accompanied the Queen at the opening of the Glasgow Science Centre and the Lighthouse. He represented the city at the funerals of The Queen Mother and Cardinal Thomas Winning.

In November 2013, Mosson announced that he had decided to vote "Yes" in the 2014 Scottish independence referendum, insisting the referendum campaign is "not a time for party politics".

Political offices
Preceded by Pat Lally	Lord Provost of Glasgow; 1999–2003	Succeeded by Liz Cameron
