= Tommy Dingwall =

Scottish politician (1930–2019)

Francis Thomas Dingwall (1930 – 30 December 2019) was a Scottish politician who served as Lord Provost of Glasgow from 1995 to 1996.

== Early life and career ==
Francis Thomas Dingwall was born in Glasgow in 1930.

His working life was spent at Albion Motor Works in Scotstoun where he was shop steward. It later became part of British Leyland.

In February 1995 he defeated Bailie Alex Mosson in election of a new Labour leader in Glasgow, and succeeded James Shields in the role of Lord Provost. His deputy in the period was Councillor Jimmy Mutter.

His period in office did not extend the normal two years but ended on 1 April 1996 due to redrawing of parliamentary boundaries on that date. He was succeeded as Lord Provost in 1996 by Pat Lally.

In 1998 Dingwall was one of the primary witnesses in the investigation of misconduct on the part of Pat Lally.

== Personal life and death ==
Dingwall was married to Winifred. They had two children, Andrew (Drew) and Alison.

Tommy Dingwall died on 30 December 2019, at the age of 89.

== Artistic recognition ==
Dingwall was portrayed in office by Brian McLaughlin.
