= Constitutional Research Council =

The Constitutional Research Council (CRC) is a Unionist funding organisation, chaired by Scottish Conservative Richard Cook. It helped to fund the DUP's Leave campaign in Northern Ireland, and in mainland Britain, during the Brexit referendum in 2016. The CRC made a record-breaking donation to the DUP's leave campaign of £435,000, which was mainly used to fund advertising on the UK mainland.

The CRC has also funded the European Research Group and its chairman, the Brexit minister Steve Baker.

The CRC has no website, publishes no accounts and does not reveal the names of its donors. The only office-holder to be made public is the chairman Richard Cook, a former vice-chairman of the Scottish Conservative and Unionist Party, parliamentary candidate in Glasgow Cathcart in 2003 and at the 2005 by-election, and a supporter of The Freedom Association. Cook has had business connections with Prince Nawwaf bin Abdulaziz Al Saud, the former Saudi minister for finance, government spokesman, diplomat and head of intelligence, and the Danish arms dealer Peter Haestrup who has been linked to a gun running case in West Bengal described by Indian authorities as “the biggest crime in the country's history".

According to Cook, the CRC are prepared to help fund the anti-independence campaign during any proposed second Scottish independence referendum.

== See also ==
- Democratic Unionist Party (DUP)
- Conservative–DUP agreement
- Political funding in the United Kingdom
