= Liz Cameron =

British politician. Former Lord Provost of Glasgow

Elizabeth Cameron

Councillor, Glasgow City Council
- In office 3 May 2007 – 3 May 2017
- Preceded by: New ward
- Constituency: Garscadden/Scotstounhill
- In office 6 April 1995 – 3 May 2007
- Preceded by: New ward
- Succeeded by: Multi-member ward
- Constituency: Knightswood South

Lord Provost of Glasgow
- In office 15 May 2003 – 17 May 2007
- Preceded by: Alex Mosson
- Succeeded by: Bob Winter

Personal details
- Born: Partick, Glasgow
- Party: Scottish Labour Party
- Education: University of Glasgow
- Profession: Lecturer

Liz Cameron is a former Lord Provost of Glasgow.

Born in Partick, Glasgow, she graduated from the University of Glasgow and became a college lecturer, teaching at Bell College of Technology in Hamilton. First elected as a Labour member of the Glasgow District Council in 1992, she was elected to the new Glasgow City Council to represent the Knightswood South ward in 1995.

After having served as convener of the council's Art and Culture Committee from 1998 to 2003, she was unanimously elected by the city council to replace Alex Mosson as Lord Provost in May 2003, a post which she held for four years. After her term as Lord Provost, she sat as a councillor for a further 10 years, before retiring from the council at the 2017 elections.

Government offices
Preceded by Alex Mosson	Lord Provost of Glasgow; 2003–2007	Succeeded by Bob Winter
