= 2005 Glasgow Cathcart by-election =

Scottish Parliament by-election

The 2005 Glasgow Cathcart by-election to the Scottish Parliament was held on 29 September 2005. It was caused by the resignation from the Scottish Parliament of Mike Watson, who won the seat at both the 1999 and 2003 elections.

On 15 November 2004, Watson had been charged with two counts of fire-raising while attending a private reception at Edinburgh's Prestonfield House Hotel three days previously. After initially registering not guilty pleas to both charges on 23 August 2005, on 1 September he changed his plea on the first count to guilty, and had a not guilty plea accepted on the second charge. Sentencing has been deferred till 22 September. On the same day Watson admitted his guilt, he resigned from the Scottish Parliament necessitating the by-election.

The short time span between Watson's resignation and the by-election has been the cause of some controversy. George Reid, the Parliament's Presiding Officer set the date citing that it was in the best interests of the public to have it on this date, the date already set for the Livingston by-election caused by the death of Robin Cook as having alternative dates would have led to months of electioneering, which he felt was against the public interest. The Scottish National Party (SNP) leader, Alex Salmond felt that the Labour Party had brought undue pressure to bear on the Presiding Officer though and angrily charged that the date was set merely to suit Labour's purposes as they were worried about a strong SNP challenge (the SNP had come second in the constituency in recent elections).

Charan Gill, a well known Glasgow entrepreneur had a high-profile attempt at becoming Labour's candidate for the by-election, and was reputedly supported by First Minister, Jack McConnell. However he only joined the Labour Party days before the deadline for application and Labour's Scottish Executive Committee ruled that he was ineligible under the terms of the party constitution. Former Glasgow City Council Leader, Charlie Gordon was chosen as their candidate on 9 September. Others in the frame for Labour were former teacher and current Councillor Irene Graham; voluntary sector worker Archie Graham, who is also the husband of Glasgow Pollok MSP Johann Lamont; and Manjinder Singh Shergill, a business analyst with Scottish Power.

Maire Whitehead, a previous candidate in Cathcart and a former Primary School Headteacher was chosen by the SNP as their candidate on the same day as Gordon was selected by Labour. She defeated Bill Kidd, twice a candidate elsewhere in Glasgow and the SNP Trade Union Group organiser and Tommy Tonner, a Glasgow-based consultant.

The Scottish Socialist Party chose Ronnie Stevenson; the Liberal Democrats, Arthur Sanderson; and former Lord Provost of Glasgow Pat Lally, who stood as an independent in the seat in 2003, fought it once again. Richard Cook, who also stood in the seat in 2003, was the Conservative candidate whilst the Greens picked Chloe Stewart, a 31-year-old NHS employee in Glasgow, and the UKIP chose Bryan McCormack. Chris Creighton put his name forward as an independent candidate.

== Result ==
By-election 2005: Glasgow Cathcart
Party	Candidate	Votes	%	±%
Labour	Charlie Gordon	5,811	37.7	−1.5
SNP	Maire Whitehead	3,406	22.1	+5.8
Conservative	Richard Cook	2,306	15.0	+2.1
Liberal Democrats	Arthur Sanderson	1,557	10.1	+2.3
Independent	Pat Lally	856	5.6	−5.2
Scottish Socialist	Ronnie Stevenson	819	5.3	−7.3
Green	Chloe Stewart	548	3.6	New
Independent	Chris Creighton	59	0.4	New
UKIP	Bryan McCormack	54	0.4	New
Majority		2,405	15.6	−7.3
Turnout		15,416	32.0	−13.0
Labour hold		Swing	-3.7	

== Previous election result ==
2003 Scottish Parliament election: Glasgow Cathcart
Party	Candidate	Votes	%	±%
Labour	Mike Watson	8,742	39.19	−8.9
SNP	David Ritchie	3,630	16.27	−11.9
Conservative	Richard Cook	2,888	12.95	+0.7
Scottish Socialist	Malcolm Wilson	2,819	12.64	New
Local Health Concern	Pat Lally	2,419	10.84	New
Liberal Democrats	Tom Henery	1,741	7.8	−0.3
Parent Excluded	Robert Wilson	68	0.3	New
Majority		5,112	22.92	+3.0
Turnout		22,307	45.0	−7.5
Labour hold		Swing	+1.5	

== See also ==
- Elections in Scotland
- List of by-elections to the Scottish Parliament
