= Peter Murrell =

Former Chief Executive Officer of the Scottish National Party

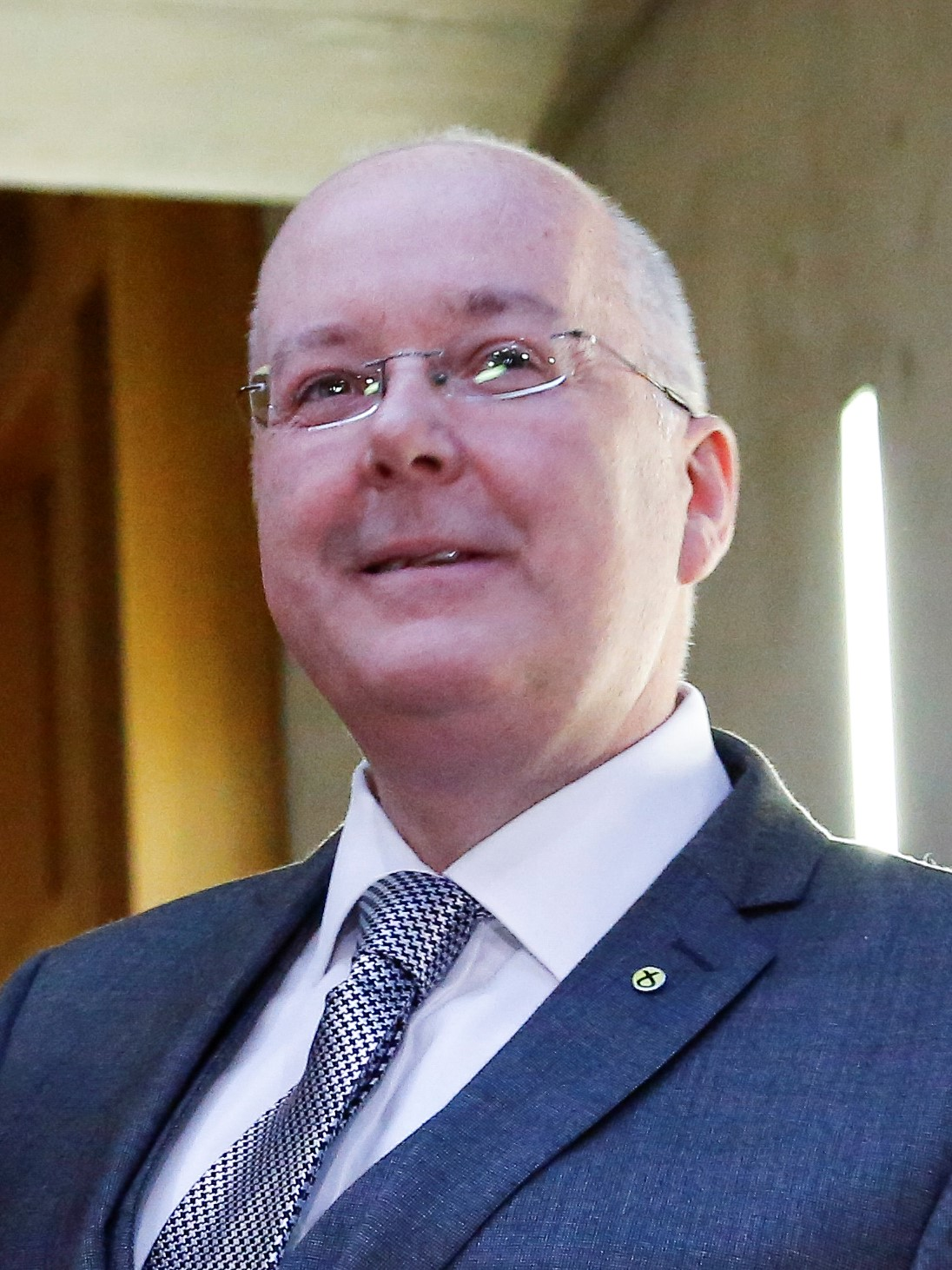
- Murrell in 2014

Chief Executive of the Scottish National Party
- In office 2001 – 18 March 2023
- Leader: John Swinney; Alex Salmond; Nicola Sturgeon
- Preceded by: Michael Russell
- Succeeded by: Michael Russell (acting)

Personal details
- Born: Peter Tierney Murrell; 8 December 1964 (age 61) Edinburgh, Scotland
- Party: Scottish National Party (until 2024)
- Spouse: Nicola Sturgeon (m. 2010; sep. 2025)
- Criminal information
- Status: Imprisoned
- Conviction: Embezzlement
- Penalty: 5 years and 3 months in prison

Details
- Date apprehended: 5 April 2023

Peter Tierney Murrell (/ˈmʌrəl/; born 8 December 1964) is a Scottish former political worker who served as Chief Executive of the Scottish National Party (SNP) from 2001 to 2023. He was married to former party leader and First Minister of Scotland, Nicola Sturgeon from 2010 until their separation in January 2025. From 2010 to 2022, Murrell abused his position to embezzle over £400,000 from the SNP's funds, for which he was arrested in 2025 and imprisoned in 2026 for five years and three months.

A key figure in the SNP for over twenty years, Murrell was regarded as central to the SNP's victory in the 2007 Scottish Parliament election. He came under greater scrutiny after 2015 when his wife Nicola Sturgeon became SNP leader, and his role in both the Alex Salmond sexual harassment scandal and controversial party financing led several senior party figures to call for his resignation. After being accused of giving misleading party membership figures during the 2023 Scottish National Party leadership election, Murrell resigned as chief executive in March of that year.

Murrell subsequently resigned his membership of the party after being arrested as part of Operation Branchform, a major police investigation into the party's finances. He was charged with embezzlement in 2024 and subsequently convicted in 2026.

== Early life and career ==
Peter Tierney Murrell was born on 8 December 1964 in Edinburgh, Scotland. He studied at Craigmount High School. Before entering politics, he was a public relations officer for the Church of Scotland for four years.

In 1989, Murrell was elected Membership Convener by the SNP Peterhead branch. In the May 1992 local elections for Banff and Buchan District Council, Murrell was election agent for candidates in both the Longside / Rattray, and Buchanhaven / Catto wards. In June 1993 Murrell was re-appointed secretary of the Banff and Buchan branch of Citizens Advice. By May 1994, Murrell was a research assistant to party leader Alex Salmond. In February 1995, Murrell was working as a Parliamentary Assistant to Dr Allan Macartney MEP based in Aberdeen. The Evening Express stated that he had been "previously responsible for MP Alex Salmond's Banff Buchan office". In December 1996 Murrell's reported role was "constituency researcher". During his time working for the SNP, Murrell acted as its fishing spokesperson.

By February 1999, he was working as a staff member in the new office of MEP Ian Hudghton in Aberdeen along with Dr Eilidh Whiteford. He was described as "a former assistant to both SNP leader Alex Salmond and the late Allan Macartney". In March 1999 Murrell was quoted in The Press and Journal as "SNP Fisheries Spokesman" who supported controls on the number of grey seals.

== Personal life ==
While running Alex Salmond's Banff and Buchan constituency office, Murrell helped to organise SNP youth weekends. He first met 18-year-old Nicola Sturgeon at one of these events in 1988. Sturgeon and Murrell began a relationship in 2003 and were married in July 2010 at Òran Mór in Glasgow. On 13 January 2025, Sturgeon announced in an Instagram post that she and Murrell had separated and were to divorce.

== Chief Executive of SNP (2001–2023) ==
=== Early years ===
Murrell replaced Michael Russell as chief executive of the Scottish National Party (SNP) in 2001, under the leadership of John Swinney. He had previously worked in the Banff and Buchan constituency office of Alex Salmond, the former party leader.

The party's success in the 2007 elections was credited to organisation by Murrell.

=== Sturgeon leadership ===
Murrell's wife became party leader and First Minister in 2015, bringing his role as chief executive under greater scrutiny. Sturgeon insisted that there was no conflict of interest in herself and her husband both occupying senior party roles, telling The Herald, "I've been deputy leader for years while Peter's been chief executive for 10 years. That's not been an issue that's given rise to any concern internally. In the constitution of the SNP, the oversight of the administrative side of the party lies with the business convener, not with the leader. So I'm comfortable there are no issues that arise."

Following the 2017 United Kingdom general election, where the SNP unexpectedly lost 21 seats, questions were raised within the party over the concentration of power among a "coterie" of top advisers that included Murrell. In January 2019 Kenny MacAskill, former SNP Justice Secretary, suggested that Murrell should resign, saying that a married couple running senior positions in the same organisation would not be tolerated in the media, business, or public sectors.

Following his testimony to the Committee on the Scottish Government Handling of Harassment Complaints in December 2020, Murrell was reported to the Lord Advocate by committee member Murdo Fraser, who alleged Murrell had made a "false statement" under oath while giving evidence. Murrell said he "absolutely refuted" the allegation.

In 2021, Murrell faced questions from party members over the alleged disappearance of £600,000 in donations to the party. The Scotsman reported in June 2021 that Police Scotland had been asked to investigate Murrell regarding a donation to SNP from lottery winners Colin and Christine Weir, which they subsequently asked to be returned to them. Murrell also faced questions from Labour and Conservatives over a £107,620 interest-free loan made to the SNP on 20 June 2021, that was not declared to the Electoral Commission for more than a year after the July 2021 deadline. The SNP stated that it did not declare the loan as it "did not think" the matter was reportable. The loan was to assist with cashflow problems at the party. These concerns escalated into a major police investigation into fraud, codenamed Operation Branchform, in which Murrell was ultimately arrested and charged.

When his wife, Nicola Sturgeon, announced her resignation as first minister on 15 February 2023, Joanna Cherry, an SNP MP, called for Murrell to step down as CEO of the party.

=== Membership numbers and resignation ===
During the 2023 leadership election, the SNP was pressed to reveal the size of its membership. The party’s national executive committee published the figure of 72,186 as of 15 February 2023, down from 104,000 members in 2021. There had been earlier reports that the party's membership had dropped by around 30,000. Murray Foote, the SNP's media chief, had described these reports as "inaccurate" and "drivel". In response to the confirmation of the numbers, he said he had been acting in "good faith" with earlier "inaccurate drivel" comments, but resigned his position "in good faith".

This then led to the SNP's national executive committee giving Murrell an ultimatum as he was blamed for Foote having been misinformed. Murrell resigned as SNP Chief Executive "with immediate effect" on 18 March 2023 ahead of a vote of no-confidence. In a statement, Murrell said: "Responsibility for the SNP's responses to media queries about our membership number lies with me as chief executive. While there was no intent to mislead, I accept that this has been the outcome. I have therefore decided to confirm my intention to step down as chief executive with immediate effect." He was succeeded as acting SNP chief executive by Michael Russell.

== Criminal investigation into SNP finances ==
=== Embezzlement ===
Between 2010 and 2022, Murrell used his position as SNP chief executive to embezzle hundreds of thousands of pounds from party funds. This included spending £124,550 on a luxury Niesmann + Bischoff motorhome, paid for in 2020 entirely with party funds. Murrell also created false documents to disguise the payment as a legitimate party expense. The motorhome was seized by police in 2023 as part of the Operation Branchform investigation. His first major purchase, a £33,000 Volkswagen Golf, was made in early 2016 using £16,489 of SNP money. He also used £57,500 of party cash to buy a Jaguar I-Pace car in 2019, and sold it for £47,378.76 two years later. Murrell also used SNP funds for extensive purchases of luxury items, including two Bremont watches for a total of £9,350, a £4,225 Starwalker World Time fountain pen, a £3,500 Hamilton & Inches silver wine coaster, and a £150 Folio Society edition of Hannah Arendt's The Origins of Totalitarianism.

=== Operation Branchform ===
In 2021, Police Scotland launched an investigation, codenamed Operation Branchform, into possible fundraising fraud in the Scottish National Party after £660,000 raised to campaign for a second independence referendum could not be accounted for. Between 2018 and 2022, Murrell made several loans to the party, including one of over £100,000 in 2021, that were not properly reported to the Electoral Commission. The stated reason for the £100,000 loan was to assist with the party's cash-flow after the Scottish Parliament election in May 2021, although by April 2023 the majority of the loan had not been repaid, with £60,000 still outstanding. Early in 2023, there were calls for Murrell to stand down because of the investigation into the loan he had made to the party.

On 5 April 2023, Murrell was arrested by police in connection with Operation Branchform. Police Scotland said they were searching a number of addresses, and police were seen at the SNP headquarters in Edinburgh and at the home of Murrell and Sturgeon in Glasgow. He was later released without charge, pending further investigation. As part of the investigation, the motorhome Murrell had illicitly purchased was seized from his mother's home near Dunfermline. Murrell later resigned his membership of the SNP.

=== Arrest and prosecution ===
On 18 April 2024, Murrell was re-arrested in connection with the investigation. Later that day, Murrell was formally charged with embezzlement of funds from the SNP. Murrell appeared in court for the first time on 20 March 2025 charged with embezzlement. He did not enter a plea. He was released on bail pending his trial. Murrell faced eight charges of embezzling a total of £459,000 from 2010 to 2023, including using party funds to illicitly buy a £124,550 campervan and other vehicles for his personal use, as well as separately buying luxury goods, cosmetics and jewellery.

In July 2025 it was reported that the Scottish Legal Aid Board (SLAB) had approved an application by Murrell's lawyers for solemn legal aid. SLAB's decision prompted speculation as to Murrell's financial situation, and whether legal aid would be terminated if the SNP repaid the £60,000 still outstanding of his 2021 loan to the party. Former SNP MP and King's Counsel Joanna Cherry criticised the decision to award Murrell legal aid, saying that she had represented people of lesser means who did not receive or received little legal aid. She questioned why details of the allegations against Murrell had not been published, fourteen weeks after his initial charge: "I'm interested in these details as the funds in question were raised from ordinary decent people who deserve to know what is alleged to have happened to their donations." Prosecution expenses for the case were reported to have more than doubled from £206,000 in February to £460,000 in July 2025.

On 25 May 2026, Murrell appeared at Edinburgh High Court, where he pleaded guilty to embezzlement. The prosecution reduced the total sum involved to £400,310.65, and the period of offending was shortened by three months. He was remanded in custody and, on 23 June, was sentenced to five years and three months imprisonment.
