= Charlie Gordon =

Scottish Labour Party politician

Member of the Scottish Parliament for Glasgow Cathcart
- In office 29 September 2005 – 22 March 2011
- Preceded by: Mike Watson
- Succeeded by: James Dornan
- Majority: 2,189 (10.1%)

Leader of Glasgow City Council
- In office 1999–2005
- Preceded by: Frank McAveety
- Succeeded by: Steven Purcell

Personal details
- Born: Charles Gordon; 28 October 1951 (age 74) Glasgow, Scotland, UK
- Party: Labour (from 1980s)
- Other political affiliations: IMG (until 1974); SWRP (1974–76); SLP (1976–c. 81)
- Spouse: Emma Gordon

Charles Gordon (born 28 October 1951, Glasgow) is a former Scottish Labour Party politician. He was the Member of the Scottish Parliament (MSP) for Glasgow Cathcart from 2005 to 2011.

== Political career ==
Born in Glasgow, Gordon was educated at St Mungo's Academy in the East End of the city. He entered politics as a member of the Trotskyist International Marxist Group (IMG), but left that organisation in 1974 to join the Scottish Workers' Republican Party (SWRP), a small far-left grouping that advocated the establishment of a Scottish socialist republic. Gordon contributed to the party's journal, Scottish Worker, and was influential in its decision to seek affiliation with the Fourth International, which led to a split within its ranks.

In 1976, the leaders of the SWRP joined Jim Sillars's fledgling Scottish Labour Party (SLP) en masse, ostensibly with the intention of recruiting followers and kicking out IMG 'entrists' within the new party. Although the ex-SWRP contingent were distrusted by Sillars for their alleged Trotskyist sympathies, they soon assumed positions of responsibility. Gordon himself became chair of the party's Glasgow West branch, and stood as the SLP candidate in Knightswood ward at the 1977 Glasgow District Council election, where he came second from bottom with 222 votes.

After the SLP was disbanded in 1981, Gordon – like many of the party's activists – chose to join the Labour Party. He was elected to represent the Drumry/Summerhill division on Strathclyde Regional Council in 1987 and remained a councillor until 1996, when the council was abolished. He was President of the P.O.L.I.S. Network (Promoting Operational Links for Integrated Services) of European Cities and Regions applying information technology to transport, from 1992 to 1995.

In 1995, he was elected to the new Glasgow City Council where he was Roads Convenor. He was Chair of the new Strathclyde Passenger Transport Authority from 1996 to 1999 and was elected Deputy Leader of Glasgow City Council in 1997. In 1999, he became Leader of Glasgow City Council, an office which he held until 2005. As Leader of Glasgow City Council he announced a project to regenerate the Clyde waterfront.

In 2005, following the resignation of Mike Watson as the MSP for Glasgow Cathcart, Gordon was selected as the candidate and on 29 September 2005 won the by-election by 2,405 votes from the Scottish National Party (SNP) candidate Maire Whitehead. In the 2011 Scottish Parliament election, he lost his seat by 1,592 votes to SNP candidate James Dornan.

Gordon is also a trade unionist, starting off in the Woodworkers' Union before becoming a branch and district official in the National Union of Railwaymen (later the National Union of Rail, Maritime and Transport Workers or RMT). He is a former President of Glasgow Trades Council and is currently a member of the GMB union.

== Family ==
Gordon has two adult sons from his first marriage and a son, Calum, with his second wife, Emma.

Political offices
Preceded by Frank McAveety	Leader of Glasgow City Council; 1999–2005	Succeeded by Steven Purcell
Scottish Parliament
Preceded by Mike Watson	Member of the Scottish Parliament for Glasgow Cathcart; 2005–2011	Succeeded by James Dornan
