= Joanna Cherry =

Scottish lawyer and former politician

Joanna Cherry KC
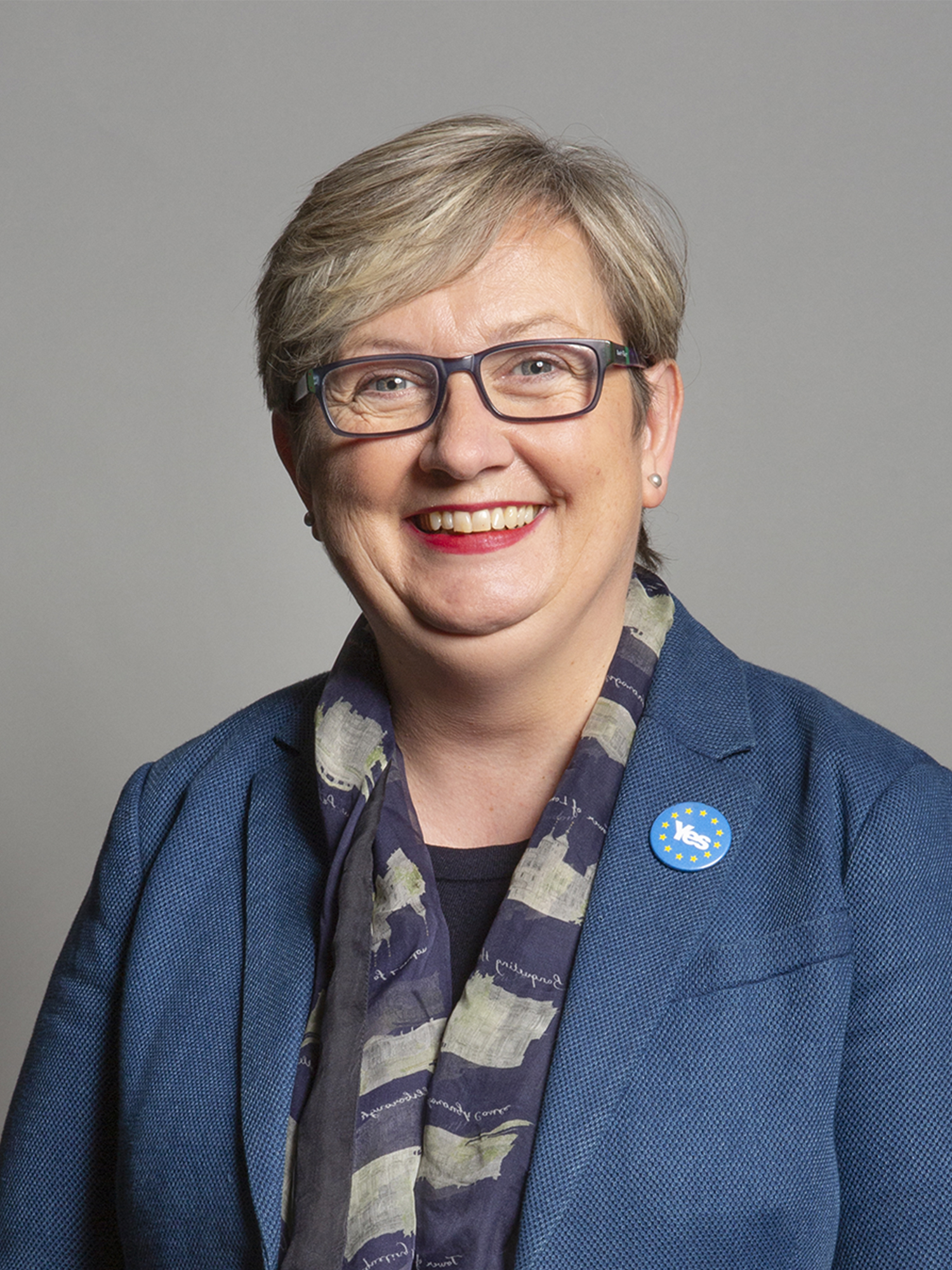
- Official portrait, 2019

SNP Spokesperson for Home Affairs in the House of Commons
- In office 20 May 2015 – 1 February 2021
- Leader: Angus Robertson; Ian Blackford
- Preceded by: Office established
- Succeeded by: Stuart McDonald

SNP Spokesperson for Justice in the House of Commons
- In office 20 May 2015 – 1 February 2021
- Leader: Angus Robertson; Ian Blackford
- Preceded by: Office established
- Succeeded by: Anne McLaughlin

Chair of the Joint Committee on Human Rights
- In office 10 January 2024 – 30 May 2024
- Preceded by: Harriet Harman
- Succeeded by: David Alton
- In office 21 July 2022 – 26 June 2023
- Preceded by: Harriet Harman

Member of Parliament for Edinburgh South West
- In office 7 May 2015 – 30 May 2024
- Preceded by: Alistair Darling
- Succeeded by: Scott Arthur

Personal details
- Born: Joanna Catherine Cherry; 18 March 1966 (age 60) Edinburgh, Scotland
- Party: Independent (2025–present)
- Other political affiliations: Scottish National Party (2008–2025); Labour (1980s)
- Education: University of Edinburgh

Joanna Catherine Cherry (born 18 March 1966) is a Scottish lawyer and former politician who was the Member of Parliament (MP) for Edinburgh South West from 2015 until 2024. As a member of the Scottish National Party (SNP), she was the party's Home Affairs and Justice Spokesperson in the House of Commons from 2015 to 2021. She left the SNP in late 2025 after years as an outspoken critic of the party's leadership and direction.

== Early life and career ==
Joanna Cherry was born on 18 March 1966 in Edinburgh to Mary Margaret (née Haslette) and Thomas Alastair Cherry. She was educated at Holy Cross primary school, then at St Margaret's Convent School, before studying at the University of Edinburgh. Cherry was brought up in a family that took a close interest in Scottish and Irish history and politics.

Following her graduation, Cherry worked as a research assistant with the Scottish Law Commission (1990) before practising as a solicitor with the Edinburgh legal firm Brodies WS until 1995. She also worked as a part-time tutor in constitutional law, family law and civil court practice at the University of Edinburgh from 1990 to 1996. In 1990, she was a member of the editorial board of the political magazine Radical Scotland.

Cherry was admitted as an advocate in 1995, with a particular interest in employment and industrial relations, health and safety, mental health, personal injury and professional negligence.

She served as a Standing Junior Counsel to the Scottish Government from 2003 to 2008, and as an Advocate Depute and Senior Advocate Depute from 2008 until 2011. She was appointed a Queen's Counsel in 2009 (becoming a King's Counsel upon the death of Elizabeth II) and was an advocate with the Arnot Manderson stable within the Faculty of Advocates until her election to parliament.

Cherry set up the "Lawyers for Yes" group, which campaigned for a pro-independence "Yes" vote in the 2014 Scottish independence referendum.

== Political career ==
=== 2015–17 Parliament ===
At the 2015 general election, Cherry was elected to Parliament as MP for Edinburgh South West with 43% of the vote and a majority of 8,135. Following her election, Cherry was appointed as the SNP spokesperson for Justice and Home Affairs at Westminster.

In May 2017, Cherry apologised for telling journalists that a nurse, who had told a TV debate audience she had been unable to survive on her salary and had to use food banks, was believed to be the wife of a Conservative councillor. These false claims were retweeted by other SNP politicians, with the nurse experiencing online and offline harassment.

=== 2017–19 Parliament ===
Cherry was re-elected as MP for Edinburgh South West at the snap 2017 general election with a decreased vote share of 35.6% and a decreased majority of 1,097. Following the election, she came second to Ian Blackford by a few votes to succeed Angus Robertson as SNP Westminster group leader.

In October 2017, she was an observer at the 2017 Catalan independence referendum.

In May 2019, executives from Facebook and Twitter appeared before the Parliamentary Joint Committee on Human Rights, of which Cherry was a member, and faced accusations over the way they handled abuse and harassment of parliamentarians on social media. Cherry cited several abusive tweets that were not removed swiftly by Twitter. Cherry received a death threat sent via social media, and was given police protection whilst attending her constituency surgery.

In May 2019 it was reported that Cherry had had her parliamentary credit card repeatedly suspended for failing to repay money on time.

On 11 May 2019 it was reported that Cherry was being investigated by the House of Commons over bullying complaints from four former employees. Cherry rejected the allegations, and alleged that they were part of a politically-motivated smear campaign from her opponents in the SNP. One former staff member took the complaint forward, alleging that Cherry condoned bullying by her office manager and partook in bullying behaviour herself. Cherry was exonerated by the Parliamentary Commissioner for Standards, and given leave to issue a statement to that effect.

In September 2019, Cherry was the leading litigant in the Scottish court case challenging the five-week prorogation of Parliament by Prime Minister Boris Johnson. Her case Cherry v Advocate General for Scotland, together with a case brought in England and Wales by Gina Miller, was ultimately successful in the Supreme Court, resulting in the quashing of the prorogation on 24 September 2019.

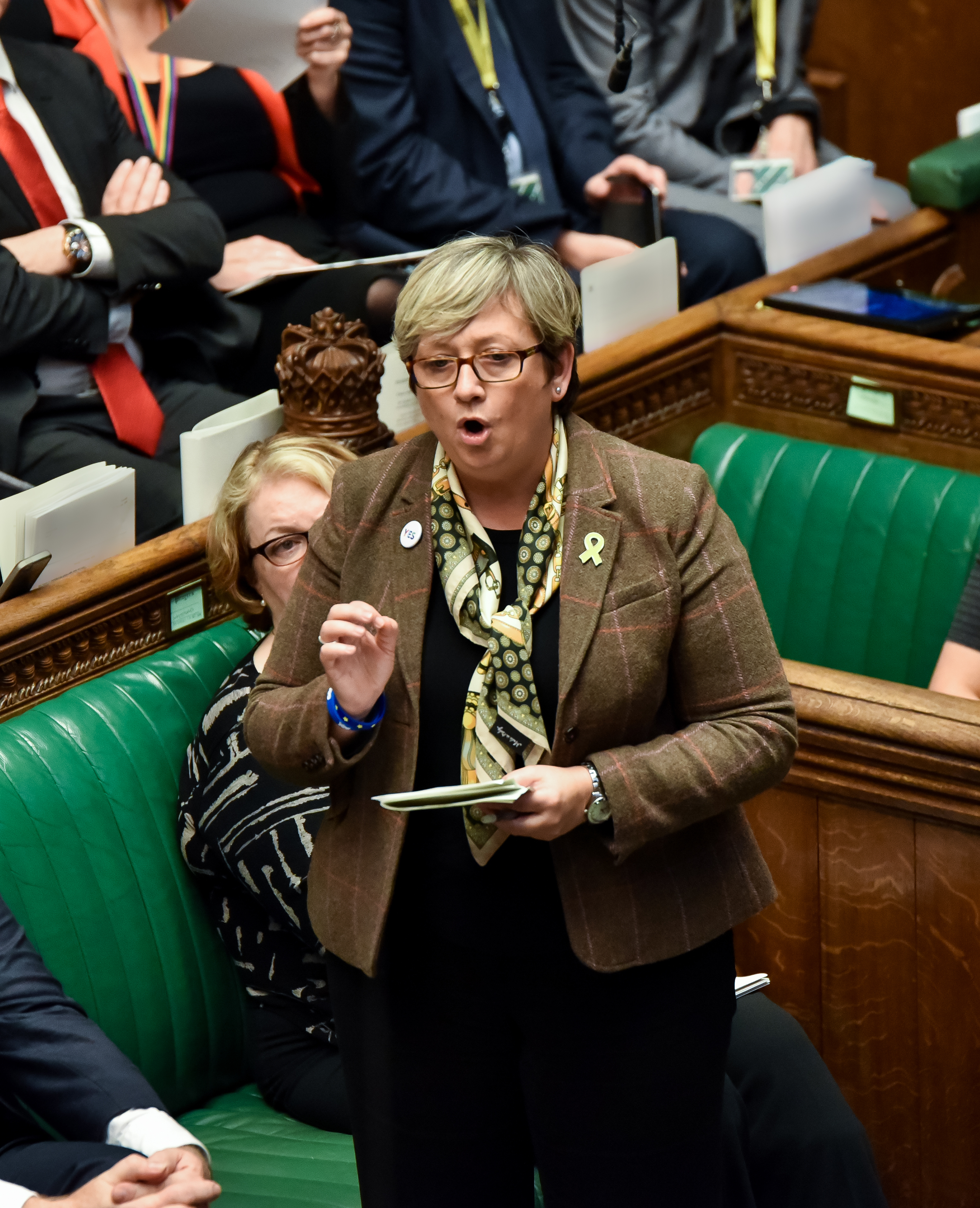
Cherry debating the renegotiated Brexit withdrawal agreement in the House of Commons in October 2019.

=== 2019–24 Parliament ===
==== 2019–21 SNP frontbench ====
At the 2019 general election, Cherry was again re-elected, with an increased vote share of 47.6% and an increased majority of 11,982.

In February 2020, Cherry announced that she was seeking nomination from the SNP Edinburgh Central constituency branch to run as the candidate for Edinburgh Central in the Scottish Parliament and would stand down as an MP in the House of Commons if elected. Angus Robertson also announced his intention to seek nomination for the Edinburgh Central constituency. In July 2020, Cherry announced she would not stand in the Scottish Parliament election, as she was not willing to resign as an MP first, which was required by new SNP rules. She stated that the party's conditions for standing as an MSP were unreasonable and made a fair contest involving her impossible.

In January 2021, she supported an amendment to the (devolved) Hate Crime and Public Order (Scotland) Act 2021 that would have exempted "criticism of matters relating to transgender identity" from violating provisions relating to protected characteristics in the bill. Later that month, she was criticised by SNP colleague Kirsty Blackman after expressing support for Sarah Phillimore, who had been banned from Twitter for allegedly making transphobic and antisemitic statements.

On 1 February 2021, Cherry was sacked from the SNP's front bench by the party leadership. The party's Westminster leader Ian Blackford said: "Team working and cooperation are key to ensure results and this reshuffle will give us a strong team to take us forward", and an SNP spokesman said that she was removed because of unacceptable behaviour.

On 21 February 2021, Cherry was criticised by the Scottish branch of PEN International for threatening defamation action against a man who criticised her on Twitter. After Cherry disputed she had taken legal action, letters from her solicitors on her behalf were published. Jolyon Maugham, with whom she had worked on the legal challenge over Boris Johnson's prorogation of Parliament, criticised her for using legal threats to prevent criticism of her.

On 26 March 2021, Cherry announced that she was stepping back from her public duties for health reasons. On 10 May 2021, following the 2021 Scottish Parliament election, she began a gradual return to her work. On 31 May 2021, she resigned from the SNP national executive committee.

==== 2021–24: Backbench campaigning ====
In June 2021, she signalled her support for For Women Scotland campaigner Marion Millar, who was charged under the Malicious Communications Act 1988, with a hate-crime aggravation, for allegedly transphobic and homophobic social media posts. Later that month, Cherry announced that she was returning to the bar to defend Millar in court. The case was subsequently dropped by prosecutors.

In July 2022, Cherry was elected as the chair of the Parliamentary Joint Committee on Human Rights, having previously served as the deputy chair. She was covering for Harriet Harman, who temporarily stepped down to chair the Privileges Committee during its investigation into Boris Johnson, and returned to the deputy role after the investigation concluded.

In October 2022, with fellow "gender critical" parliamentarians Rosie Duffield and Anne Jenkin, Baroness Jenkin of Kennington, Cherry set up a cross-party "biology policy unit", "to help ensure policies across the public sector that are based on gender identity theory are documented and scrutinised".

During the 2023 SNP leadership contest, Cherry was the only SNP parliamentarian to endorse Ash Regan, and introduced her at her campaign launch. On 13 February, Cherry called for SNP chief executive Peter Murrell—husband of outgoing party leader Nicola Sturgeon—to step down during the contest. He stepped down on 17 March over a dispute around publication of membership numbers.

In May 2023, The Stand Comedy Club cancelled a proposed event by Cherry, who compared the cancellation to actions by the Stasi. The Stand reversed the cancellation when Cherry threatened to make a legal claim against them for discrimination in respect of her "gender-critical" beliefs. Following her Stand appearance that August, Cherry said that she felt "palpable hostility" from staff working the event, saying "Stand staff saw fit to continue the unlawful harassment of me on account of my sexuality and beliefs". The manager of the event said: "[As] one of only four people she dealt with on the day (only two of them staff of the Stand) I am very surprised at this. It was not raised at the event and cannot imagine what she is talking about."

In July 2023 a 23-year-old woman was tried, accused of sending a threatening electronic message to Cherry. Cherry appeared in court over a tweet that she described as "frightening threats". Her chief of staff, Fraser Thomson, said: "I took it to be a very serious attempt on Joanna Cherry's life". The woman was cleared of threatening her: the judge found reasonable doubt that the tweet "STG I am gonna pop Joanna Cherry", in reply to a newspaper article on her, was grossly offensive, or of an indecent, obscene or menacing character.

==== Relationship with Alex Salmond ====
Cherry has long admired the former SNP leader and first minister Alex Salmond, describing him after her election alongside him as "the person I most admire in my political life by a mile" and has been referred to as a Salmondite. During the accusations and charges of sexual harassment against Salmond, Cherry was described as one of his allies in the party and a critic of then-leader Nicola Sturgeon.

Before his trial, Cherry told Holyrood that "Alex is my friend, and I was brought up to stand by my friends. It's the kind of family I come from. Alex is clear that he's innocent and I respect that". In March 2020, after Salmond was acquitted in court, she called for a public inquiry into the handling of the accusations against him. Later that year she called for him to be reinstated to the SNP, from which he had resigned. In February 2021, she called for the government to release documents which Salmond claimed proved that Sturgeon had been part of a conspiracy against him. In March 2021, when Salmond formed the Alba Party, Cherry denied speculation she would be defecting to join him.

Following Salmond's death in October 2024, Cherry said that inappropriate sexual behaviour Salmond had admitted to was not criminal, and reiterated that he was acquitted of the criminal charges. In 2025, she said she believed there had been a conspiracy to pervert the course of justice in relation to him, saying she would publish further information in memoirs she was then writing.

==== Relationship with Nicola Sturgeon ====
Cherry had a fractious relationship with Nicola Sturgeon, Salmond's successor, who led the party for most of Cherry's time in parliament. Cherry described their relationship as becoming "sworn enemies" following an expletive-laden phone-call in 2019 in which Cherry said she have used threats to blackmail Sturgeon to prevent any potential disciplinary action being taken against Cherry over alleged bullying in her office. In the following years, Cherry began speaking out against transgender policies and was increasingly in conflict with the party on this, as she became involved in gender critical campaigning.

Cherry was as one of the most outspoken critics in the SNP of Sturgeon, who she believed had done wrong by her predecessor, Salmond. She saw Ian Blackford, who defeated Cherry in the vote to be the SNP's Westminster leader in 2017, and who ultimately removed her from the frontbench team, as an ally of Sturgeon. Cherry has been an outspoken critic of the party's strategy for achieving independence.

When Sturgeon stepped down, Cherry supported those standing against Humza Yousaf, who succeeded Sturgeon, saying that the SNP leadership wanted him to be first minister. When John Swinney, who she had known since their teens, replaced Yousaf as leader in 2024, he called her to attempt to offer an olive branch. Although not hostile to him as she was Sturgeon, when revealing she had left the party, weeks ahead of the 2026 election, she called him a coward, and said she thought the SNP would be better for time in opposition,

Cherry wrote in her memoir "how the spirit of the Yes campaign was crushed and replaced with an authoritarian leadership which encouraged a cult-like adoration", and said Sturgeon's premiership had damaged Scottish society. Cherry was also suspicious of the timing of the first covid lockdown in March 2020, which coincided with and overshadowed Alex Salmond's acquittal. Sturgeon's spokesperson subsequently described Cherry as a “deeply bitter individual who has an obsession with Nicola”, who she “owe[d] her election victories”.

In May 2026, Cherry called for an independent inquiry into how Sturgeon's former husband Peter Murrell was able to commit embezzlement of the SNP's finances, for which she criticised Sturgeon for showing a "remarkable lack of curiosity".

=== After Parliament ===
In the 2024 general election, Cherry lost her seat to the Labour candidate, Scott Arthur, in a swing that was disproportionately large; this outlying result was attributed to her "thoroughly marmite" nature. Mark McGeoghegan in The Herald wrote "If the SNP-to-Labour swing in her constituency had matched the national average, she would have held her seat. Such an excessive swing was not down to a national leader who had resigned more than two years prior."

After she lost her seat, Cherry criticised Sturgeon and said that under her leadership the SNP's reputation for competence and integrity had been damaged. Sturgeon responded that it would be the "easy solution" for people to "take refuge in somehow it’s all my fault". A week after the election Cherry said she would not stand for the Scottish Parliament in the 2026 election unless the party addressed her complaints.

In March 2025, she said that she had made threats of legal action against the SNP should they discipline her, and that this was the only reason she had been able to remain a member.

Cherry left the SNP in late 2025. She said that she had "become absolutely disgusted" with the party while writing her memoir Keeping the Dream Alive, which was published by Icon Books on 23 April 2026. During the marketing push for her book, she said she thought the SNP would be best off losing the next month's Scottish parliament election and consequently spending time out of government.

== Political positions ==
=== Before devolution ===
Cherry grew up in a family that took a close interest in Scottish and Irish history and politics. Her father had been a Labour Party supporter, but was a member of the SNP by the 1970s. After the devolution referendum and General Election in 1979, Joanna Cherry was one of the founding members of the Edinburgh Branch of the Young Scottish Nationalists, but in 1983, following the SNP's proscription of the left-wing 79 Group, she joined the Labour Party. From the late 1980s she was active in the Campaign for a Scottish Assembly, participating in the cross-party movements Scotland United and Democracy for Scotland, and serving on the editorial board of the political magazine Radical Scotland.

=== Scottish independence ===
Cherry supports both Scottish independence and a potential second Scottish independence referendum. She has been described as a more hardline supporter of independence, advocating a less cautious approach towards holding a second referendum than Nicola Sturgeon, including the holding a referendum even if the Scottish government could not come to an agreement with the British government over such a referendum. She has stated that she believes emulating the Irish First Dáil could be a path forward for the Scottish independence movement, stating that "One hundred years ago, Irish independence came about not as a result of a referendum but as a result of a treaty negotiated between Irish parliamentarians and the British Government after nationalist MPs had won the majority of Irish seats in the 1918 general election and withdrawn to form a provisional government in Dublin". She has additionally denied that she advocates for illegally holding a referendum.

=== Other political parties ===
In 2015 Cherry said that as a teenager, she wanted to be a Labour MP. She was very involved with Labour Students while at university, a contemporary of Douglas Alexander. She remained in the Labour Party after graduation, before becoming disillusioned in their lack of action on home rule and insufficient opposition to the Poll tax. She started voting for the SNP "in the mid 90s before joining the party in 2008".

After not being included in Ian Blackford's SNP front bench in 2021, she spoke of approaches for her to defect, saying "I've had approaches from people in the Labour Party and people in the Alba Party". She added: "If I lived in England, I would definitely be a member of the Labour Party. I have a great affection for the Labour Party".

In 2021, Cherry said that she had voted to support the Bute House Agreement, a power-sharing agreement between the SNP and the Scottish Greens. She subsequently criticised the deal, and in 2023 and 2024, she said that she had voted against it in 2021. She then corrected this, stating that she had supported the vote.

=== Transgender rights ===
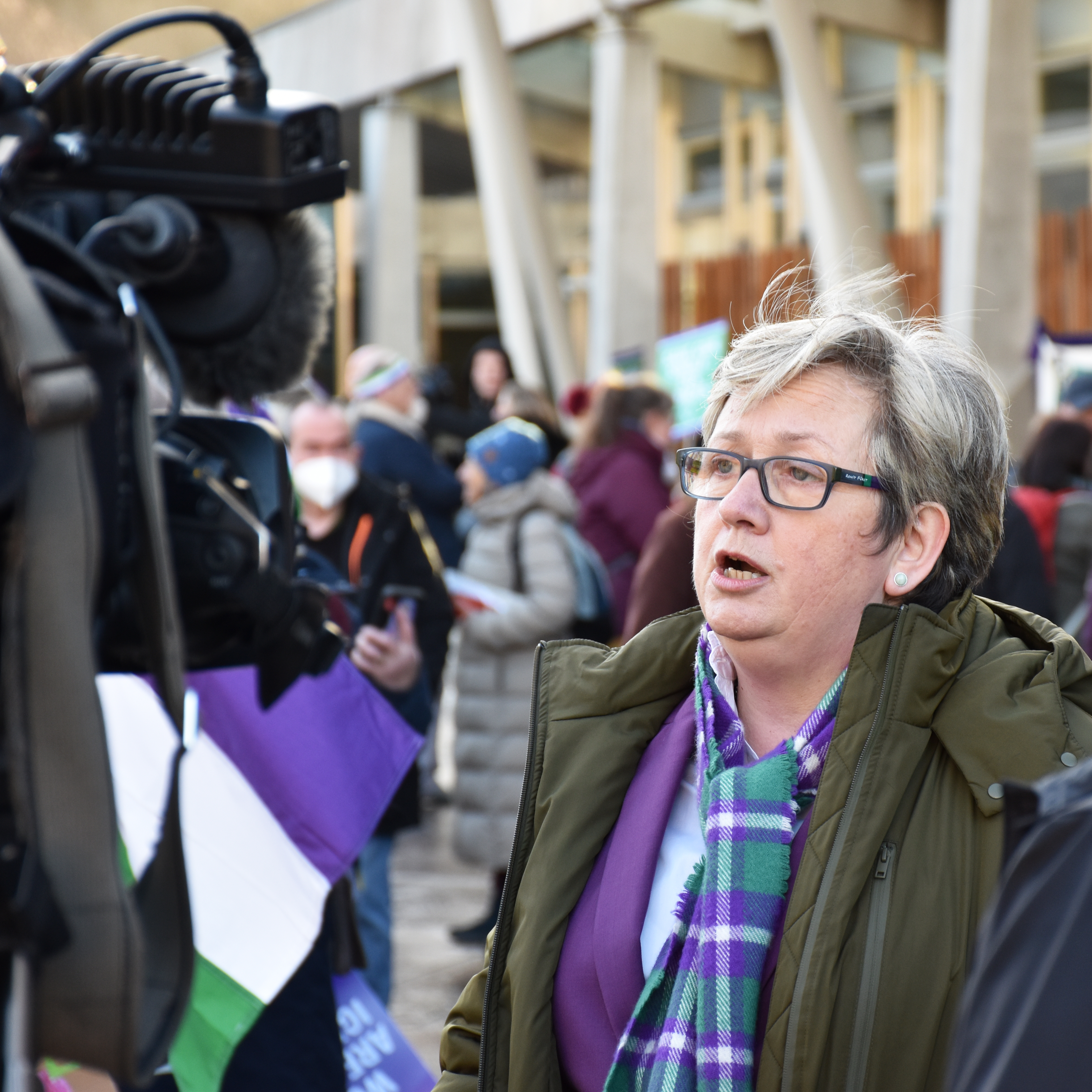
Cherry at a demonstration against the Gender Recognition Reform Bill on 21 December 2022.

Cherry has described trans young people as "children with psychological problems", saying they should be treated accordingly and called for Scotland's only gender identity clinic to be closed. Cherry has denied accusations of transphobia, stating that she approaches the issue "as a feminist" and that there was a "big dose of misogyny" in debates over Gender Recognition Act reform. She said that the statement "women don't have penises" is an "undeniable biological fact". She is a member of the Advisory Group of Sex Matters, the British gender-critical advocacy group.

Cherry opposed reforms of the Gender Recognition Act in Scotland to allow transgender people to obtain a Gender Recognition Certificate on the basis of a statutory declaration, rather than requiring medical reports and evidence of having lived in the acquired gender for at least 2 years. She has stated that she has faced abuse over her position and that sections of the SNP with opposing views have "engaged in performative histrionics redolent of the Salem witch trials".

Writing in The National in June 2021, Cherry stated that some veteran members of the LGBT+ community no longer felt welcome at Pride events due to their views on transgender rights, claimed that LGBT+ rights charity Stonewall's workplace inclusion schemes misrepresent the law, and stated her belief that "many same-sex attracted women and those who hold gender-critical beliefs have found themselves in a relationship of coercive control with employers, service providers and membership organisations". She has faced criticism from LGBT charities over her views and statements thereof.

In November 2021, Cherry tweeted that a ban on conversion therapy should not criminalise therapists working with patients with gender dysphoria. The SNP's LGBTQ+ wing, Out for Independence, and SNP Students accused her of "justifying conversion therapy" and called for the party to remove the whip from Cherry.

=== Afghanistan ===
In October 2021, Cherry criticised the Biden administration's actions during the withdrawal of troops from Afghanistan and the Fall of Kabul, and urged Prime Minister Boris Johnson to help the refugees fleeing the Taliban.

=== European Union ===
Cherry supported Remain during the 2016 United Kingdom European Union membership referendum and has supported an independent Scotland joining the European Union. In March 2019, she announced she would be proposing a motion to force the government to revoke Article 50 if the UK was due to leave in a No Deal Brexit on 10 April that year.

In July 2020, she called for the SNP to stop fighting against Brexit, stating that "we lost the battle and Brexit is now an irreversible reality."

== Personal life ==
Cherry lists her personal interests as travel, reading and swimming. She is a lesbian.

== Works ==
- Keeping the Dream Alive (Icon Books, 2026) ISBN 978-1-83-773346-0

Parliament of the United Kingdom
Preceded by Alistair Darling	Member of Parliament for Edinburgh South West; 2015–2024	Succeeded by Scott Arthur
