= Glasgow Cathcart (Scottish Parliament constituency) =

Region or constituency of the Scottish Parliament

- Former burgh constituency for the Scottish Parliament

- Glasgow Cathcart shown within the Glasgow electoral region and the region shown within Scotland
- Population: 74,809 (2019)

Former constituency
- Created: 1999
- Abolished: 2026
- Council area: Glasgow City
- Replaced by: Glasgow Cathcart and Pollok, Glasgow Southside

Glasgow Cathcart (Gaelic: Glaschu Cathcart) was a constituency of the Scottish Parliament (Holyrood), being one of eight constituencies within the Glasgow City council area. It elected one Member of the Scottish Parliament (MSP) by the plurality (first past the post) method of election. It was also one of nine constituencies in the Glasgow electoral region, which elected seven additional members, in addition to nine constituency MSPs, to produce a form of proportional representation for the region as a whole.

As a result of the second periodic review of Scottish Parliament boundaries in 2025, the constituency was abolished ahead of the 2026 Scottish Parliament election. Most of Glasgow Cathcart became part of the new seat of Glasgow Cathcart and Pollok, with a portion also being transferred to Glasgow Southside.

The seat was held by James Dornan of the Scottish National Party from the 2011 Scottish Parliament election until its abolition.

== Electoral region ==
During the period Glasgow Cathcart existed, the other eight constituencies of the Glasgow region were: Glasgow Anniesland, Glasgow Kelvin, Glasgow Maryhill and Springburn, Glasgow Pollok, Glasgow Provan, Glasgow Shettleston, Glasgow Southside, and Rutherglen.

During this period the region covered the Glasgow City council area and a north-western portion of the South Lanarkshire council area.

== Constituency boundaries ==
Map of boundaries from 2011

The Glasgow Cathcart constituency was created at the same time as the Scottish Parliament, for the 1999 Scottish Parliament election, with the name and boundaries of an existing Glasgow Cathcart constituency of the UK Parliament. For the 2005 United Kingdom general election, Scottish constituencies for the House of Commons were amended, whilst the boundaries were retained for the Scottish Parliament. There is now no longer any link between the two sets of boundaries.

=== Boundary review ===
Following the First Periodic review into Scottish Parliament boundaries, a newly redrawn Cathcart was in place for the 2011 Scottish Parliament election. The electoral wards used in this creation are:

- Linn, Newlands/Auldburn, Langside

== Member of the Scottish Parliament ==
Election	Member	Party
1999	Mike Watson	Labour
2005	Charlie Gordon	Labour
2011	James Dornan	SNP

== Election results ==
=== 2020s ===
2021 Scottish Parliament election: Glasgow Cathcart
Party	Candidate	Constituency			Regional		
Party	Candidate	Votes	%	±%	Votes	%	±%
SNP	James Dornan (Note: Incumbent member for this constituency)	21,728	57.0	▲4.1	15,658	40.8	▼2.3
Labour Co-op	Craig Carson (Note: Carson stood on a joint ticket on behalf of Scottish Labour and the Scottish Co-operative Party. The regional list vote is for Scottish Labour only.)	11,332	29.7	▲7.5	8,926	23.3	▲3.0
Green					6,109	15.9	▲4.4
Conservative	Euan Blockley	4,041	10.6	▼4.1	4,815	12.5	▼2.5
Liberal Democrats	Joe McCauley	1,051	2.8	▼2.8	791	2.1	▼0.6
Alba					676	1.8	New
Independent Green Voice					314	0.8	New
All for Unity					264	0.7	New
Scottish Family					194	0.5	New
TUSC					111	0.3	New
Women's Equality					82	0.2	▼0.6
Abolish the Scottish Parliament					73	0.2	New
Communist					67	0.2	New
Reform					65	0.2	New
Independent	Craig Ross				65	0.2	New
Scottish Libertarian					57	0.1	New
UKIP					38	0.1	▼1.6
Reclaim					18	0.05	New
Independent	Daniel Donaldson				17	0.04	New
SDP					14	0.04	New
Renew					13	0.03	New
Freedom Alliance (UK)					4	0.01	New
Majority		10,396	27.3	▼3.4			
Valid votes		38,152			38,371		
Invalid votes		335			97		
Turnout		38,487	62.7	▲12.1	38,468	62.7	▲12.1
SNP hold		Swing					

=== 2010s ===
2016 Scottish Parliament election: Glasgow Cathcart
Party	Candidate	Constituency			Regional		
Party	Candidate	Votes	%	±%	Votes	%	±%
SNP	James Dornan (Note: Incumbent member for this constituency)	16,200	52.9	▲7.4	13,240	43.1	▲2.5
Labour	Soryia Siddique	6,810	22.2	▼17.2	6,229	20.3	▼10.5
Conservative	Kyle Thornton	4,514	14.7	▲5.5	4,598	15.0	▲6.7
Green					3,535	11.5	▲4.4
Liberal Democrats	Margot Clark	1,703	5.6	▲1.3	832	2.7	0.0
TUSC	Brian Smith	909	3.0	New			
UKIP					536	1.7	▲1.2
Independent	Chris Creighton	501	1.6	New			
Solidarity					399	1.3	New
RISE					385	1.3	New
BUP					263	0.9	New
Animal Welfare					254	0.8	New
Women's Equality					235	0.8	New
Scottish Christian					200	0.7	0.0
Independent	Andrew McCullagh				33	0.1	New
Majority		9,390	30.7	▲24.6			
Valid votes		30,637			30,739		
Invalid votes		179			68		
Turnout		30,816	50.6	▲5.5	30,807	50.6	▲5.5
SNP hold		Swing		▲12.3			
Notes

2011 Scottish Parliament election: Glasgow Cathcart
Party	Candidate	Constituency			Regional		
Party	Candidate	Votes	%	±%	Votes	%	±%
SNP	James Dornan	11,918	45.5	N/A	10,674	40.6	N/A
Labour	Charlie Gordon (Note: Incumbent member for this constituency)	10,326	39.4	N/A	8,090	30.8	N/A
Conservative	Richard Sullivan	2,410	9.2	N/A	2,196	8.3	N/A
Green					1,863	7.1	N/A
Respect					1,039	4.0	N/A
Liberal Democrats	Eileen Baxendale	1,118	4.3	N/A	701	2.7	N/A
All-Scotland Pensioners Party					625	2.4	N/A
Independent	John McKee	450	1.7	N/A			
Socialist Labour					226	0.9	N/A
Scottish Christian					193	0.7	N/A
Scottish Unionist					159	0.6	N/A
BNP					145	0.6	N/A
UKIP					140	0.5	N/A
Scottish Socialist					101	0.4	N/A
Pirate					87	0.3	N/A
Independent	Caroline Johnstone				38	0.1	N/A
Scottish Homeland Party					23	0.1	N/A
Majority		1,592	6.1	N/A			
Valid votes		26,222			26,300		
Invalid votes		166			96		
Turnout		26,388	45.1	N/A	26,396	45.1	N/A
SNP win (new boundaries)							

=== 2000s ===
2007 Scottish Parliament election: Glasgow Cathcart
Party	Candidate	Votes	%	±%
Labour	Charlie Gordon	8,476	39.1	−0.1
SNP	James Dornan	6,287	29.0	+12.7
Independent	David Smith	2,911	13.4	New
Conservative	Davena Rankin	2,832	10.2	−2.7
Liberal Democrats	Shabnum Mustapha	1,659	7.7	−0.1
Majority		2,189	10.1	−12.8
Turnout		21,657	45.3	+0.3
Labour hold		Swing		

2005 Scottish Parliament by-election: Glasgow Cathcart
Party	Candidate	Votes	%	±%
Labour	Charlie Gordon	5,811	37.7	−1.5
SNP	Mairie Whitehead	3,406	22.1	+5.8
Conservative	Richard Cook	2,306	15.0	+2.1
Liberal Democrats	Arthur Sanderson	1,557	10.1	+2.3
Independent	Pat Lally	856	5.6	−5.2
Scottish Socialist	Ronnie Stevenson	819	5.3	−7.3
Green	Chloe Stewart	548	3.6	New
Independent	Chris Creighton	59	0.4	New
UKIP	Bryan McCormack	54	0.4	New
Majority		2,405	15.6	−7.3
Turnout		15,416	32.0	−13.0
Labour hold		Swing		

2003 Scottish Parliament election: Glasgow Cathcart
Party	Candidate	Votes	%	±%
Labour	Mike Watson	8,742	39.2	−8.9
SNP	David Ritchie	3,630	16.3	−11.8
Conservative	Richard Cook	2,888	12.9	+0.6
Scottish Socialist	Malcolm Wilson	2,819	12.6	New
Local Health Concern	Pat Lally	2,419	10.8	New
Liberal Democrats	Tom Henery	1,741	7.8	−0.3
Parent Excluded	Robert Wilson	68	0.3	New
Majority		5,112	22.9	+2.9
Turnout		22,307	45.0	−7.5
Labour hold		Swing	+1.5	

=== 1990s ===
1999 Scottish Parliament election: Glasgow Cathcart
Party	Candidate	Votes	%
Labour	Mike Watson	12,966	48.1
SNP	Marie Whitehead	7,592	28.1
Conservative	Mary Leishman	3,311	12.3
Liberal Democrats	Callan Dick	2,187	8.1
Socialist Workers	Roddy Slorach	920	3.4
Majority		5,374	20.0
Turnout		26,976	52.5
Labour win (new seat)			

== See also ==
- Glasgow Cathcart (UK Parliament constituency)
- Politics of Glasgow
