= Bremont =

British watchmaker

Bremont Watch Company Limited
- Formerly: Tavannes Limited (April–June 2005)
- Type: Private
- Industry: Watchmakers
- Founded: 2002
- Founder: Nick English; Giles English
- Headquarters: Henley-on-Thames, England, UK
- Key people: Davide Cerrato (CEO)
- Products: Watches
- Website: bremont.com

Bremont Watch Company Limited is a luxury aviation-themed British watchmaker based in England. Annual production is approximately 10,000 pieces for an approximate annual revenue of £40 million. All of their watches are either COSC or ISO chronometer rated and built in the United Kingdom.

== History ==
Bremont was founded by brothers Nick and Giles English. The brothers had gained mechanical experience from their father Dr. Euan English, an ex-RAF pilot who had a PhD in Aeronautical Engineering. This evolved from clock assembly, and aeroplane and yacht construction. On 4 March 1995 Euan English was killed and Nick was badly injured when their World War II-vintage Harvard aircraft crashed during a training flight for an air show. The crash spurred the brothers to purchase North Weald Flying Services and after working there together they decided to create their own watch company.

Previous logo

In 2021, the company opened the Bremont Manufacturing & Technology Centre, known as "The Wing" outside Henley-on-Thames, a 35,000-square-foot manufacturing facility where it machines components and assembles timepieces. At full capacity, the company expects The Wing can manufacture up to 50,000 watches annually, which would be five times their current output. The company estimates The Wing and the machinery cost more than £25 million ($34 million).

In 2023, American billionaire Bill Ackman and Hellcat Acquisitions invested £48.4 million into the brand, becoming majority owners. Initially, Nick and Giles English remained board members as founders and non-executive directors, however, in April 2025, Bremont announced that the brothers were no longer board members but would remain brand ambassadors.

== Awards ==
Since its founding, Bremont have received awards in various fields: Watch Pro ‘Watch Company Of The Year’ 2019; HSBC Global Connections, overall winner, 2013; UK Retail Jewellery Awards, Luxury Watch Brand Of The Year and Store Design Of The Year 2013; Watch Pro ‘Luxury Watch Of The Year’ 2012; Luxury Briefing Awards, ‘Breakthrough Brand’, 2012; UK Jewellery Awards, ‘Watch Brand of the Year Award’, 2011; Walpole British Luxury ‘Best Emerging British Luxury Brand’ 2008.

== Military ==
Bremont has created a number of special-edition watches for serving or former members of the armed forces, based on its commercial models. Purchases of these watches are restricted to people who have flown in the subject aircraft, served in the military units commemorated or, in one case, served on board a particular warship.

Bremont have been a long-time supporter of the armed services through its work with Help for Heroes, The Royal British Legion and official supporter of the UK Team for the Invictus Games. This relationship culminated in the launch of a completely new HMAF range of watches following an agreement which sees Bremont given the license to use signs, symbols, and Heraldic Badges from all three branches of Britain’s Armed Forces.
