= Glasgow (Scottish Parliament electoral region) =

- electoral region for the Scottish Parliament
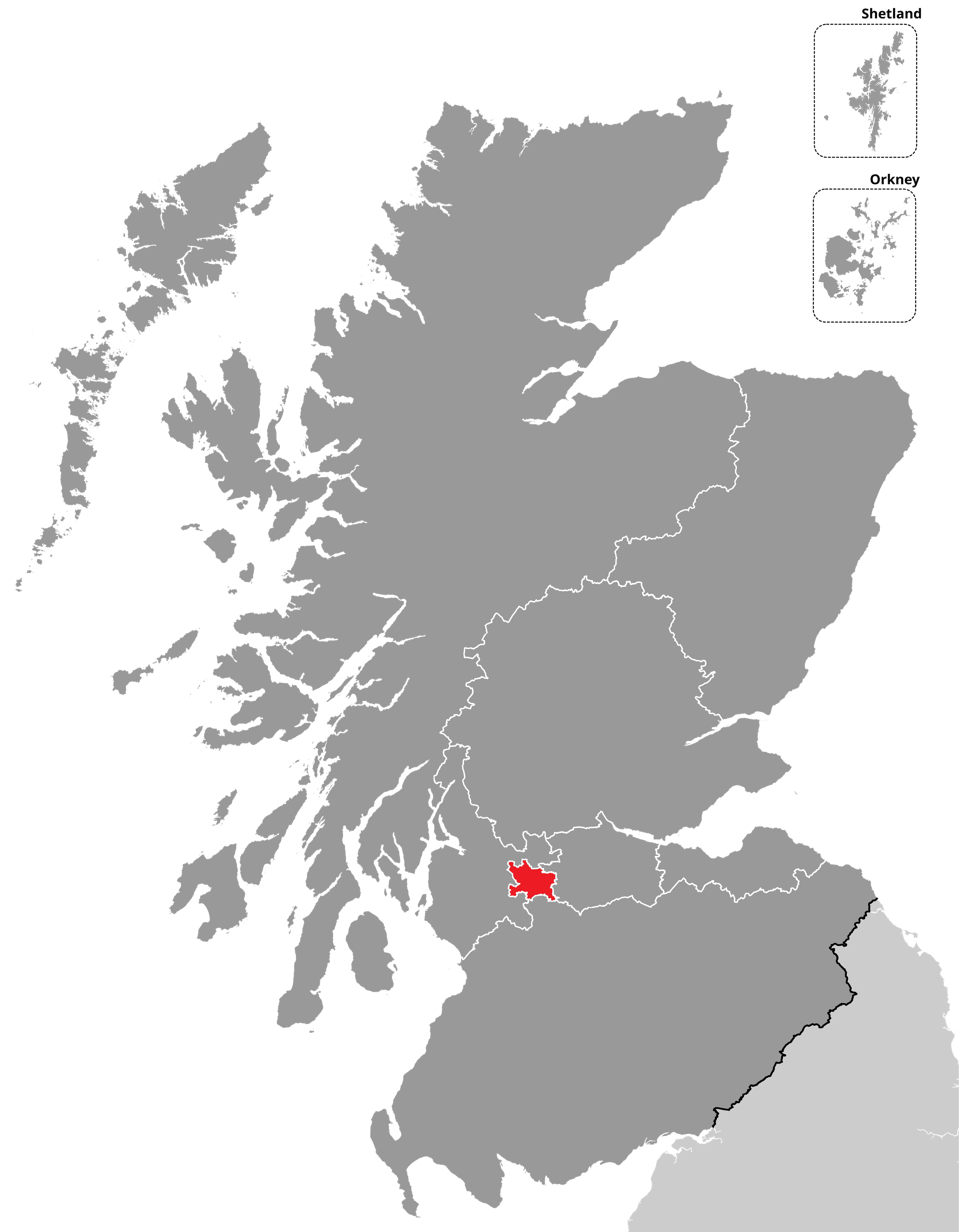
- Glasgow electoral region shown within Scotland
- Electorate: 500,456 (2022)

Current electoral region
- Created: 1999
- MSPs: Scottish National Party 7 Scottish Green 3 Labour 3 Reform 2
- Council areas: Glasgow City (part); South Lanarkshire (part)
- Constituencies: Glasgow Anniesland; Glasgow Baillieston and Shettleston; Glasgow Cathcart and Pollok; Glasgow Central; Glasgow Easterhouse and Springburn; Glasgow Kelvin and Maryhill; Glasgow Southside; Rutherglen and Cambuslang

Glasgow is one of the eight electoral regions of the Scottish Parliament. Under the additional-member electoral system used for elections to the Scottish Parliament, eight of the parliament's 73 first past the post constituencies are sub-divisions of the region, which also elects seven of the 56 additional-member Members of the Scottish Parliament (MSPs). The region thus elects a total of 15 MSPs. Prior to the Second periodic review of Scottish Parliament boundaries in 2025 the region consisted of nine constituencies, and thus elected 16 MSPs in total.

== Constituencies and council areas ==
=== 2026–present ===
As a result of the second periodic review of Scottish Parliament boundaries, the boundaries for the region and its constituencies were redrawn for the 2026 Scottish Parliament election. It now consists of the eight constituencies shown below.

Region	Constituencies from 2026
	1. Glasgow Anniesland; 2. Glasgow Baillieston and Shettleston; 3. Glasgow Cathcart and Pollok; 4. Glasgow Central; 5. Glasgow Easterhouse and Springburn; 6. Glasgow Kelvin and Maryhill; 7. Glasgow Southside; 8. Rutherglen and Cambuslang.

Seven of these constituencies are entirely within the Glasgow City council area, whilst the Rutherglen constituency comprises the extreme north-western part of the South Lanarkshire council area which is part of the Greater Glasgow urban area. The South Lanarkshire area is otherwise divided between the Central Scotland and South of Scotland regions. The Glasgow region covers most of the Glasgow City council area, however the Renfrewshire North and Cardonald constituency, which covers parts of Glasgow and Renfrewshire, forms part of the West Scotland electoral region.

=== 2011–2026 ===
Map of boundaries from 2011

As a result of the First Periodic Review of Scottish Parliament Boundaries the boundaries of the region and constituencies were redrawn for the 2011 Scottish Parliament election.

Region	Constituencies
	1. Glasgow Anniesland; 2. Glasgow Cathcart; 3. Glasgow Kelvin; 4. Glasgow Maryhill and Springburn; 5. Glasgow Pollok; 6. Glasgow Provan; 7. Glasgow Shettleston; 8. Glasgow Southside; 9. Rutherglen

Eight of the constituencies were entirely within the Glasgow City council area. The Rutherglen constituency comprises the extreme north-western part of the South Lanarkshire council area which is part of the Greater Glasgow urban area. The South Lanarkshire area was otherwise divided between the Central Scotland and South of Scotland regions.

=== 1999–2011 ===
In terms of first past the post constituencies the region included:

Region	Constituencies	Constituencies
		1. Glasgow Anniesland; 2. Glasgow Baillieston; 3. Glasgow Cathcart; 4. Glasgow Govan; 5. Glasgow Kelvin; 6. Glasgow Maryhill; 7. Glasgow Pollok; 8. Glasgow Rutherglen; 9. Glasgow Shettleston; 10. Glasgow Springburn

The constituencies were created with the names and boundaries of Westminster constituencies, as existing in 1999. Scottish Westminster constituencies were mostly replaced with new constituencies in 2005. Holyrood constituencies were unaltered.

== Members of the Scottish Parliament ==
=== Constituency MSPs ===
Term	Election	Glasgow Anniesland	Glasgow Cathcart	Glasgow Govan	Glasgow Kelvin	Glasgow Rutherglen	Glasgow Shettleston	Glasgow Maryhill	Glasgow Baillieston	Glasgow Springburn	Glasgow Pollok
1st	1999	Donald Dewar (Labour)	Mike Watson (Labour)	Gordon Jackson (Labour)	Pauline McNeill (Labour)	Janis Hughes (Labour)	Frank McAveety (Labour)	Patricia Ferguson (Labour)	Margaret Curran (Labour)	Paul Martin (Labour)	Johann Lamont (Labour)
1st	2000 by	Bill Butler (Labour)	Mike Watson (Labour)	Gordon Jackson (Labour)	Pauline McNeill (Labour)	Janis Hughes (Labour)	Frank McAveety (Labour)	Patricia Ferguson (Labour)	Margaret Curran (Labour)	Paul Martin (Labour)	Johann Lamont (Labour)
2nd	2003	Bill Butler (Labour)	Mike Watson (Labour)	Gordon Jackson (Labour)	Pauline McNeill (Labour)	Janis Hughes (Labour)	Frank McAveety (Labour)	Patricia Ferguson (Labour)	Margaret Curran (Labour)	Paul Martin (Labour)	Johann Lamont (Labour)
2nd	2005 by	Bill Butler (Labour)	Charlie Gordon (Labour)	Gordon Jackson (Labour)	Pauline McNeill (Labour)	Janis Hughes (Labour)	Frank McAveety (Labour)	Patricia Ferguson (Labour)	Margaret Curran (Labour)	Paul Martin (Labour)	Johann Lamont (Labour)
3rd	2007	Bill Butler (Labour)	Charlie Gordon (Labour)	Nicola Sturgeon (SNP)	Pauline McNeill (Labour)	James Kelly (Labour)	Frank McAveety (Labour)	Patricia Ferguson (Labour)	Margaret Curran (Labour)	Paul Martin (Labour)	Johann Lamont (Labour)
Term	Election	Glasgow Anniesland	Glasgow Cathcart	Glasgow Southside	Glasgow Kelvin	Rutherglen	Glasgow Shettleston	Glasgow Maryhill and Springburn	Glasgow Provan	Glasgow Pollok	9 MSPs from 2011 to 2026
4th	2011	Bill Kidd (SNP)	James Dornan (SNP)	Nicola Sturgeon (SNP)	Sandra White (SNP)	Johann Lamont (Labour)	James Kelly (Labour)	John Mason (SNP)	Patricia Ferguson (Labour)	Paul Martin (Labour)	9 MSPs from 2011 to 2026
5th	2016	Bill Kidd (SNP)	James Dornan (SNP)	Nicola Sturgeon (SNP)	Sandra White (SNP)	Humza Yousaf (SNP)	Clare Haughey (SNP)	John Mason (SNP)	Bob Doris (SNP)	Ivan McKee (SNP)	9 MSPs from 2011 to 2026
6th	2021	Bill Kidd (SNP)	James Dornan (SNP)	Nicola Sturgeon (SNP)	Kaukab Stewart (SNP)	Humza Yousaf (SNP)	Clare Haughey (SNP)	John Mason (SNP)	Bob Doris (SNP)	Ivan McKee (SNP)	9 MSPs from 2011 to 2026
Term	Election	Glasgow Anniesland	Glasgow Cathcart and Pollok	Glasgow Southside	Glasgow Kelvin and Maryhill	Rutherglen and Cambuslang	Glasgow Baillieston and Shettleston	Glasgow Easterhouse and Springburn	Glasgow Central	8 MSPs from 2026	
7th	2026	Colm Merrick (SNP)	Zen Ghani (SNP)	Holly Bruce (Green)	Bob Doris (SNP)	Clare Haughey (SNP)	David Linden (SNP)	Ivan McKee (SNP)	Alison Thewliss (SNP)	8 MSPs from 2026	

=== Regional list MSPs ===
N.B. This table is for presentation purposes only

Term	Election	MSP	MSP	MSP	MSP	MSP	MSP	MSP
1st	1999	Kenneth Gibson (SNP)	Nicola Sturgeon (SNP)	Sandra White (SNP)	Dorothy-Grace Elder (SNP) (later Independent)	Tommy Sheridan (Socialist) (later Solidarity)	Robert Brown (Lib Dem)	Bill Aitken (Conservative)
1st	2002	Kenneth Gibson (SNP)	Nicola Sturgeon (SNP)	Sandra White (SNP)	Dorothy-Grace Elder (SNP) (later Independent)	Tommy Sheridan (Socialist) (later Solidarity)	Robert Brown (Lib Dem)	Bill Aitken (Conservative)
2nd	2003	Patrick Harvie (Green)	Nicola Sturgeon (SNP)	Sandra White (SNP)	Rosie Kane (Socialist)	Tommy Sheridan (Socialist) (later Solidarity)	Robert Brown (Lib Dem)	Bill Aitken (Conservative)
2nd	2006	Patrick Harvie (Green)	Nicola Sturgeon (SNP)	Sandra White (SNP)	Rosie Kane (Socialist)	Tommy Sheridan (Socialist) (later Solidarity)	Robert Brown (Lib Dem)	Bill Aitken (Conservative)
3rd	2007	Patrick Harvie (Green)	Bob Doris (SNP)	Sandra White (SNP)	Bashir Ahmad (SNP)	Bill Kidd (SNP)	Robert Brown (Lib Dem)	Bill Aitken (Conservative)
3rd	2009	Patrick Harvie (Green)	Bob Doris (SNP)	Sandra White (SNP)	Anne McLaughlin (SNP)	Bill Kidd (SNP)	Robert Brown (Lib Dem)	Bill Aitken (Conservative)
4th	2011	Patrick Harvie (Green)	Bob Doris (SNP)	Humza Yousaf (SNP)	Drew Smith (Labour)	Hanzala Malik (Labour)	Anne McTaggart (Labour)	Ruth Davidson (Conservative)
5th	2016	Patrick Harvie (Green)	James Kelly (Labour)	Johann Lamont (Labour)	Pauline McNeill (Labour)	Anas Sarwar (Labour)	Adam Tomkins (Conservative)	Annie Wells (Conservative)
6th	2021	Patrick Harvie (Green)	Pam Duncan-Glancy (Labour)	Paul Sweeney (Labour)	Pauline McNeill (Labour)	Anas Sarwar (Labour)	Sandesh Gulhane (Conservative)	Annie Wells (Conservative)
7th	2026	Patrick Harvie (Green)	Iris Duane (Green)	Paul Sweeney (Labour)	Pauline McNeill (Labour)	Anas Sarwar (Labour)	Thomas Kerr (Reform)	Kim Schmulian (Reform)
7th	July 2026	Patrick Harvie (Green)	Iris Duane (Green)	Paul Sweeney (Labour)	Pauline McNeill (Labour)	Monica Lennon (Labour)	Thomas Kerr (Reform)	Kim Schmulian (Reform)

== Election results ==
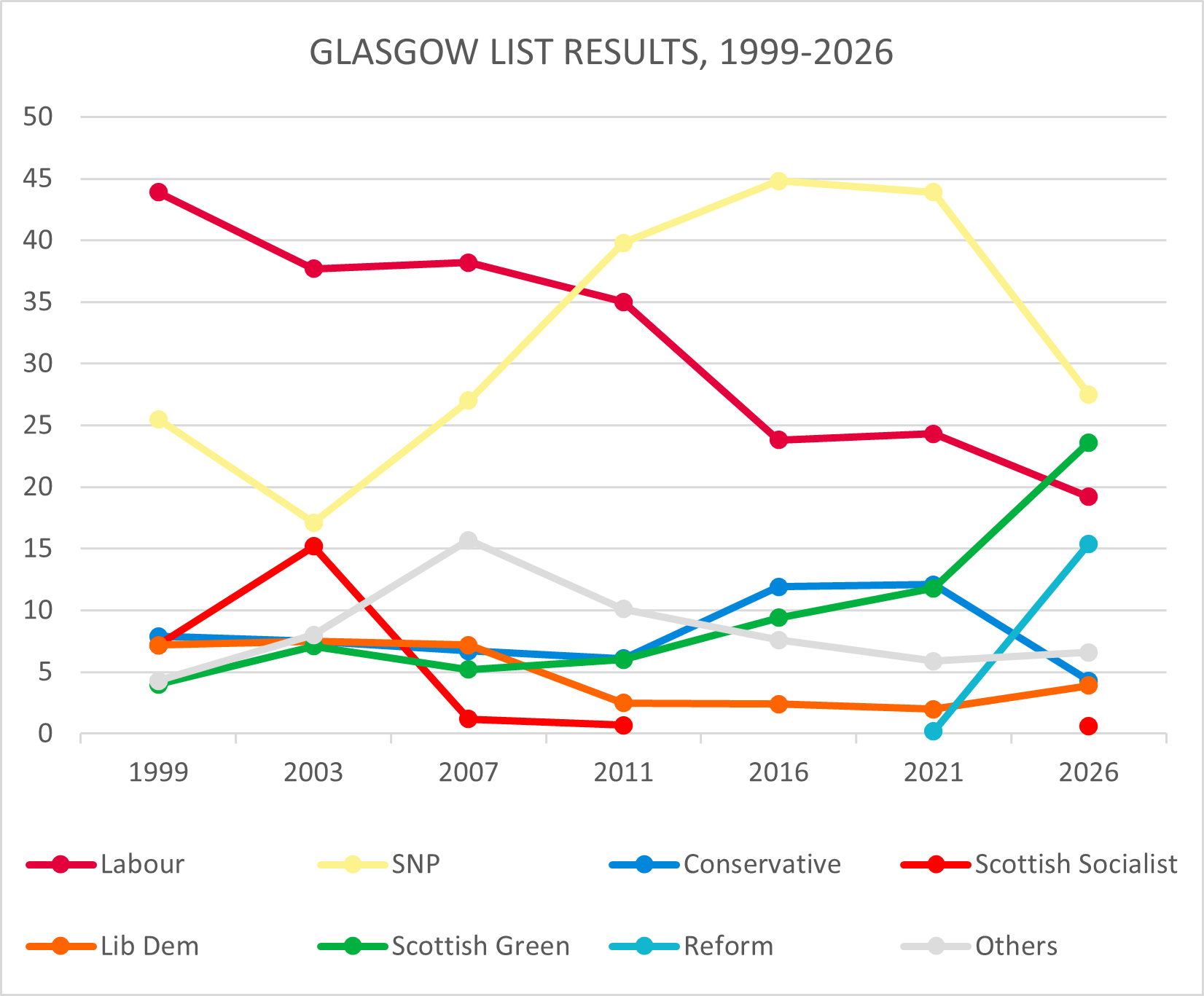
Election results since 1999 (parties who never got >5% counted as others)

=== 2026 Scottish Parliament election ===
==== Constituency results ====
2026 Scottish Parliament election: Glasgow
Constituency	Elected member	Result
Glasgow Anniesland	Colm Merrick	SNP hold
Glasgow Baillieston and Shettleston	David Linden	SNP hold
Glasgow Cathcart and Pollok	Zen Ghani	SNP hold
Glasgow Central	Alison Thewliss	SNP hold
Glasgow Easterhouse and Springburn	Ivan McKee	SNP hold
Glasgow Kelvin and Maryhill	Bob Doris	SNP hold
Glasgow Southside	Holly Bruce	Green gain from SNP
Rutherglen and Cambuslang	Clare Haughey	SNP hold

==== Additional Member results ====
2026 Scottish Parliament election: Glasgow
List	Candidates	Votes	Of total (%)	± from prev.
SNP	Alison Thewliss, Ivan McKee, Kaukab Stewart, David Linden, Graham Campbell, Colm Merrick, Declan Blench, Zen Ghani, Annette Christie, Abdul Bostani, Adekemi Giwa, Qasim Hanif	68,669	27.5	▼16.1
Green	Patrick Harvie, Holly Bruce, Iris Duane, Rana Noor Mohamed, Kit Renard, Isable Ruffell	58,881	23.6	▲11.5
Labour	Anas Sarwar, Pauline McNeill, Paul Sweeney, Monica Lennon, James Adams, Vonnie Sandlan, Eunis Jassemi	47,795	19.2	▼5.2
Reform	Thomas Kerr, Kim Schmulian, Audrey Dempsey, Allan Lyons, Paul Bennie, Aimee Alexander, Sean O'Hagan, Gordon Millar	38,341	15.4	▲15.2
Conservative	Annie Wells, Sandesh Gulhane, Ross Hutton, Kyle Park, John Murray, Josephine MacLeod, Daniel Bowman	10,621	4.3	▼7.8
Liberal Democrats	Daniel O'Malley, Paul Kennedy, James Spiers, Rachel Park, Peter McLaughlin, Amy Carman, Verity Woolley	9,826	3.9	▲1.9
AtLS	Tommy Sheridan, Dhruva Kumar, Gail Sheridan, Hilda McMahon	3,128	1.3	▲1.3
Independent Green Voice	Alistair McConnachie	2,931	1.2	▲1.2
Independent	Craig Houston	1,979	0.8	▲0.8
Scottish Family	Andrew John Brady, John Paul McArthur, Michael James O'Hara, Agnes Gallagher	1,758	0.7	▲0.7
Scottish Socialist	Liam McLaughlan, Olivia Murphy, Bill Bonnar	1,538	0.6	▲0.6
ISP	Paul Steele	1,130	0.5	▲0.5
Workers Party	Yvonne Ridley, George Galloway, Catherine McKernan, Laura Jones	924	0.4	▲0.4
Scottish Christian	John Cormack	765	0.3	▲0.3
Scottish Common	Kamran Butt, Adnan Zafar Rafiq, Thomas Adkins, Kenneth Ifeanyi Nwosu	645	0.3	▲0.3
Independent	Elspeth Kerr	327	0.1	▲0.1
UKIP	Donald MacKay, Ian Garbutt, Lynda Davis, Laurence Keeley	205	0.1	▲0.1

=== 2021 Scottish Parliament election ===
The candidates for the region in the 2021 Scottish Parliament election are as follows:

==== Constituency results ====
2021 Scottish Parliament election: Glasgow
Constituency	Elected member	Result
Glasgow Anniesland	Bill Kidd	SNP hold
Glasgow Cathcart	James Dornan	SNP hold
Glasgow Kelvin	Kaukab Stewart	SNP hold
Glasgow Maryhill and Springburn	Bob Doris	SNP hold
Glasgow Pollok	Humza Yousaf	SNP hold
Glasgow Provan	Ivan McKee	SNP hold
Glasgow Shettleston	John Mason	SNP hold
Glasgow Southside	Nicola Sturgeon	SNP hold
Rutherglen	Clare Haughey	SNP hold

2021 Scottish Parliament election: Glasgow
List	Candidates	Votes	Of total (%)	± from prev.
SNP	Roza Salih, Nicola Sturgeon, Clare Haughey, Ivan McKee, Bill Kidd, Alex Kerr, Suzanne McLaughlin, Kaukab Stewart, Katy Loudon, Christina Cannon, Abdul Bostani	133,917	43.9	▼0.9
Labour	Pauline McNeill, Anas Sarwar, Paul Sweeney, Pam Duncan-Glancy, James Kelly, Eva Murray, Craig Carson, Hollie Cameron, Willie Docherty	74,088	24.3	▲0.5
Conservative	Annie Wells, Sandesh Gulhane, Ade Aibinu, Thomas Kerr, Kyle Thornton, Lynne Nailon, Alix Mathieson	37,027	12.1	▲0.2
Green	Patrick Harvie, Kim Long, Nadia Kanyange, Jon Molyneux, Dan Hutchison, Elaine Gallacher, Emma Cockburn, Anthony Carroll, Blair Anderson, Holly Bruce, Ellie Gomersall, Calum Mcintosh	36,114	11.8	▲2.4
Liberal Democrats	Carole Ford, Andrew Chamberlain, James Speirs, Nicholas Moohan, Sheila Thomson, Mark Simons, Joe McCauley, David McKenzie, Matthew Clark	6,079	2.0	▼0.4
Alba	Michelle Ferns, Ailsa Gray, Shahid Farooq, Lynn McMahon	5,408	1.8	▲1.8
All for Unity	Jean Anne Mitchell, Ricky Morton, Christian McNeill, Khaleel Mohammed, Niall Fraser, Chris Creighton, Ian Mulholland	2,562	0.8	▲0.8
Independent Green Voice	Alistair McConnachie	2,210	0.7	▲0.7
Scottish Family	William Neeson, Joshua Hall, John Laird, David Tortolano, Margaret Paterson	1,728	0.6	▲0.6
Women's Equality	Ruth Wilkinson, Suzanne Martin, Esthi Thurston, Anna Nordahl	772	0.3	▼0.5
Freedom Alliance	Carol Dobson, Mary Steven, Diane Hodge, David Mills, Roderick Nicoll, Stephen Lonsdale	759	0.2	▲0.2
Abolish the Scottish Parliament	James Dunsmore, Robert Pressley	702	0.2	▲0.2
Scottish Libertarian	Alan Findlay, Cameron Milne	680	0.2	▲0.2
TUSC	Brian Smith, Sinead Daly, Oisin Duncan, Maddie Jamieson	645	0.2	▲0.2
Communist	Johnnie Hunter	544	0.2	▲0.2
Reform	Andy MacMillan, Jamie-Lee McMillan, Christina MacMillan, Kirsty MacMillan, Ellen MacMillan	543	0.2	▲0.2
UKIP	Daryl Gardner, Chris Ho, Amanda Ranaghan, David Hanna	447	0.1	▼1.9
Independent	Craig Ross	269	0.1	▲0.1
SDP	Anthony McGinley, Robin John Dudfield, Robert Malyn, Richard Cameron	178	0.1	▲0.1
Reclaim	Leo Kearse	174	0.1	▲0.1
Renew	Ben Meechan, Andrea Kozlowski	100	0.1	▲0.1
Independent	Daniel Donaldson	98	0.0	N/A

=== 2016 Scottish Parliament election ===
In the 2016 Scottish Parliament election the region elected MSPs as follows:

- 9 Scottish National Party MSPs (constituency members)
- 4 Labour MSPs (additional members)
- 2 Conservative MSP (additional members)
- 1 Green MSP (additional member)

==== Constituency results ====
2016 Scottish Parliament election: Glasgow
Constituency	Elected member	Result
Glasgow Anniesland	Bill Kidd	SNP hold
Glasgow Cathcart	James Dornan	SNP hold
Glasgow Kelvin	Sandra White	SNP hold
Glasgow Maryhill and Springburn	Bob Doris	SNP gain from Labour
Glasgow Pollok	Humza Yousaf	SNP gain from Labour
Glasgow Provan	Ivan McKee	SNP gain from Labour
Glasgow Shettleston	John Mason	SNP hold
Glasgow Southside	Nicola Sturgeon	SNP hold
Rutherglen	Clare Haughey	SNP gain from Labour

==== Additional member results ====
2016 Scottish Parliament election: Glasgow
List	Candidates	Votes	Of total (%)	± from prev.
SNP	Nicola Sturgeon, Humza Yousaf, Bob Doris, Bill Kidd, Rhiannon Spear, Ivan McKee, Suzanne McLaughlin, Clare Haughey, Caroline Welsh, Charandeep Singh, Maggie Lennon	111,101	44.8	▲4.9
Labour	Anas Sarwar, Johann Lamont, James Kelly, Pauline McNeill, Bill Butler, Patricia Ferguson, James Adams, Soryia Siddique, Paul Martin, Samantha Ritchie, Hanzala Malik, Anne McTaggart	59,151	23.8	▼11.1
Conservative	Adam Tomkins, Annie Wells, Sheila Mechan, Kyle Thornton, John Anderson, Graham Hutchison, Thomas Jordan Kerr, Taylor Muir, Thomas Haddow	29,533	11.9	▲5.8
Green	Patrick Harvie, Zara Kitson, Sean Templeton, Martha Wardrop, Patrick Pearse McAleer, Anni Pues, Lee Wallace, Kim Long, Anna Crow	23,398	9.4	▲3.5
Liberal Democrats	Robert Brown, Isabel Nelson, Carole Ford, James Harrison, Margot Clark, James Douglas Speirs, Tom Coleman	5,850	2.4	▼0.2
UKIP	Janice Elizabeth McKay, Jamie Robertson, John Ferguson	4,889	2.0	▲1.4
Solidarity	Tommy Sheridan, Lynn Marie Sheridan, Liza Farrell, Irene Lang, Elizabeth Waddell	3,593	1.4	▲1.4
RISE	Cat Boyd, Pinar Aksu, Bryan Simpson, Suki Sangha, James Aloysius McEnaney, Deborah Anne Waters, Andrew Rossetter	2,454	1.0	▲1.0
BUP	Steven Gordon, John Mortimer	2,453	1.0	▲1.0
Women's Equality	Anne Beetham, Susan Marion Mackay, Ruth Victoria Wilkinson, Calum Mark Shepherd, Penelope Haddrill, Carol Young	2,091	0.8	▲0.8
Animal Welfare	Barry Ellis Quinn, Andrew McLean White Orr	1,819	0.7	▲0.7
Scottish Christian	Murdo Mcleod, Christine Cormack	1,506	0.6	▼0.1
Independent	Andrew Louis Philip Stephen McCullagh	271	0.1	N/A

=== 2011 Scottish Parliament election ===
In the 2011 Scottish Parliament election the region elected MSPs as follows:

- 7 Scottish National Party MSPs (five constituency members and two additional members)
- 7 Labour MSPs (four constituency members and three additional members)
- 1 Conservative MSP (additional member)
- 1 Green MSP (additional member)

==== Constituency results ====
2011 Scottish Parliament election: Glasgow
Constituency	Elected member	Result
Glasgow Anniesland	Bill Kidd	SNP gain from Labour
Glasgow Cathcart	James Dornan	SNP gain from Labour
Glasgow Kelvin	Sandra White	SNP gain from Labour
Glasgow Maryhill and Springburn	Patricia Ferguson	Labour hold
Glasgow Pollok	Johann Lamont	Labour hold
Glasgow Provan	Paul Martin	Labour hold
Glasgow Shettleston	John Mason	SNP gain from Labour
Glasgow Southside	Nicola Sturgeon	SNP hold
Rutherglen	James Kelly	Labour hold

==== Additional member results ====
2011 Scottish Parliament election: Glasgow
Party	Elected candidates	Seats	+/−	Votes	%	+/−%
SNP	Humza Yousaf; Bob Doris	2	-2	83,109	39.8	+12.8
Labour	Hanzala Malik; Drew Smith; Anne McTaggart	3	+3	73,031	35.0	-3.3
Conservative	Ruth Davidson	1	±0	12,749	6.1	-0.6
Green	Patrick Harvie	1	±0	12,454	6.0	+0.8
Respect		0	±0	6,972	3.3	±0
Liberal Democrats		0	-1	5,312	2.5	-4.6
Scottish Senior Citizens		0	±0	3,750	1.8	±0
BNP		0	±0	2,424	1.2	-0.7
Socialist Labour		0	±0	2,276	1.1	-0.2
Scottish Christian		0	±0	1,501	0.7	-0.7
Scottish Unionist		0	±0	1,447	0.7	-0.1
Scottish Socialist		0	±0	1,362	0.7	-0.6
Pirate		0	±0	581	0.3	N/A
Independent		0	±0	338	0.2	N/A
Scottish Homeland Party		0	±0	283	0.1	N/A

=== 2007 Scottish Parliament election ===
In the 2007 Scottish Parliament election the region elected MSPs as follows:

- 9 Labour MSPs (all constituency members)
- 5 Scottish National Party MSPs (1 constituency member, 4 additional members)
- 1 Conservative MSP (additional member)
- 1 Liberal Democrat MSP (additional member)
- 1 Scottish Green Party MSP (additional member)

==== Constituency results ====
2007 Scottish Parliament election: Glasgow
Constituency	Elected member	Result
Glasgow Anniesland	Bill Butler	Labour hold
Glasgow Baillieston	Margaret Curran	Labour hold
Glasgow Cathcart	Charles Gordon	Labour hold
Glasgow Govan	Nicola Sturgeon	SNP gain from Labour
Glasgow Kelvin	Pauline McNeill	Labour hold
Glasgow Maryhill	Patricia Ferguson	Labour hold
Glasgow Pollok	Johann Lamont	Labour hold
Glasgow Rutherglen	James Kelly	Labour hold
Glasgow Shettleston	Frank McAveety	Labour hold
Glasgow Springburn	Paul Martin	Labour hold

==== Additional member results ====
2007 Scottish Parliament election: Glasgow
Party	Elected candidates	Seats	+/−	Votes	%	+/−%
Labour		0	0	78,838	38.2	+0.4
SNP	Bashir Ahmad; Sandra White; Bob Doris; Bill Kidd	4	+2	55,832	27.0	+9.9
Liberal Democrats	Robert Brown	1	±0	14,767	7.2	-0.1
Conservative	Bill Aitken	1	±0	13,751	6.7	-0.8
Green	Patrick Harvie	1	±0	10,759	5.2	-1.9
Solidarity		0	-1	8,544	4.1	N/A
BNP		0	0	3,865	1.9	+0.7
Scottish Senior Citizens		0	0	3,703	1.8	-0.5
Scottish Christian		0	0	2,991	1.4	N/A
Socialist Labour		0	0	2,680	1.3	-0.2
CPA		0	0	2,626	1.3	N/A
Scottish Socialist		0	-1	2,579	1.2	-14.0
Scottish Unionist		0	0	1,612	0.8	-0.4
Publican Party		0	0	952	0.5	N/A
Muhammad Shoaib		0	0	582	0.3	N/A
Independent Green Voice		0	0	496	0.2	N/A
UKIP		0	0	405	0.2	-0.1
Scottish Voice		0	0	389	0.2	N/A
Asif Nadir		0	0	317	0.2	N/A
Scotland Against Crooked Lawyers		0	0	293	0.1	N/A
James Cruickshank		0	0	286	0.1	N/A
Communist		0	0	260	0.1	-0.1
Nine Per Cent Growth Party		0	0	80	0.0	N/A
Rejected ballots	9,000	(4.17%)	N/A	N/A	N/A	N/A
Turnout	206,607	43.3%	+1.8%	N/A	N/A	N/A

Changes:

- Anne McLaughlin replaced Bashir Ahmad. Ahmad died in February 2009 and McLaughlin was next on the Scottish National Party's list.

=== 2003 Scottish Parliament election ===
In the 2003 Scottish Parliament election the region elected MSPs as follows:

- 10 Labour MSPs (all constituency members)
- 2 Scottish National Party MSPs (both additional members)
- 2 Scottish Socialist Party MSPs (both additional members)
- 1 Conservative MSP (additional member)
- 1 Liberal Democrat MSP (additional member)
- 1 Scottish Green Party MSP (additional member)

==== Constituency results ====
2003 Scottish Parliament election: Glasgow
Constituency	Elected member	Result
Glasgow Anniesland	Bill Butler	Labour hold
Glasgow Baillieston	Margaret Curran	Labour hold
Glasgow Cathcart	Mike Watson	Labour hold
Glasgow Govan	Gordon Jackson	Labour hold
Glasgow Kelvin	Pauline McNeill	Labour hold
Glasgow Maryhill	Patricia Ferguson	Labour hold
Glasgow Pollok	Johann Lamont	Labour hold
Glasgow Rutherglen	Janis Hughes	Labour hold
Glasgow Shettleston	Frank McAveety	Labour hold
Glasgow Springburn	Paul Martin	Labour hold

Changes:

- On 1 September 2005, Mike Watson resigned after pleading guilty to fire-raising. At the subsequent Glasgow Cathcart by-election held 29 September 2005, Charlie Gordon held the seat for Labour.

==== Additional member results ====
2003 Scottish Parliament election: Glasgow
Party	Elected candidates	Seats	+/−	Votes	%	+/−%
Labour		0	0	77,540	37.7	-6.2
SNP	Nicola Sturgeon; Sandra White	2	−2	34,894	17.1	-8.4
Scottish Socialist	Tommy Sheridan; Rosie Kane	2	+1	31,216	15.2	+8.0
Conservative	Bill Aitken	1	±0	15,299	7.5	-0.4
Liberal Democrats	Robert Brown	1	±0	14,839	7.5	-0.4
Green	Patrick Harvie	1	+1	14,570	7.1	+3.1
Scottish Senior Citizens		0	0	4,750	2.3	N/A
Socialist Labour		0	0	3,091	1.5	-0.2
ProLife Alliance		0	0	2,477	1.2	N/A
Scottish Unionist		0	0	2,349	1.1	+0.2
BNP		0	0	2,344	1.1	N/A
Scottish People's		0	0	612	0.3	N/A
UKIP		0	0	552	0.3	N/A
Communist		0	0	345	0.2	–

Changes:

- Tommy Sheridan resigned from the Scottish Socialist Party in September 2006 and sat as a member of Solidarity.

=== 1999 Scottish Parliament election ===
In the 1999 Scottish Parliament election the region elected MSPs as follows:

- 10 Labour MSPs (all constituency members)
- 4 Scottish National Party MSPs (all additional members)
- 1 Conservative MSP (additional member)
- 1 Liberal Democrat MSP (additional member)
- 1 Scottish Socialist Party MSP (additional member)

==== Constituency results ====
1999 Scottish Parliament election: Glasgow
Constituency	Elected member	Result
Glasgow Anniesland	Donald Dewar	Scottish Labour Party win (new seat)
Glasgow Baillieston	Margaret Curran	Scottish Labour Party win (new seat)
Glasgow Cathcart	Mike Watson	Scottish Labour Party win (new seat)
Glasgow Govan	Gordon Jackson	Scottish Labour Party win (new seat)
Glasgow Kelvin	Pauline McNeill	Scottish Labour Party win (new seat)
Glasgow Maryhill	Patricia Ferguson	Scottish Labour Party win (new seat)
Glasgow Pollok	Johann Lamont	Scottish Labour Party win (new seat)
Glasgow Rutherglen	Janis Hughes	Scottish Labour Party win (new seat)
Glasgow Shettleston	Frank McAveety	Scottish Labour Party win (new seat)
Glasgow Springburn	Paul Martin	Scottish Labour Party win (new seat)

Changes:

- On 11 October 2000, Donald Dewar died. At the subsequent Glasgow Anniesland by-election on 23 November 2000, Bill Butler held the seat for Labour.

==== Additional member results ====
1999 Scottish Parliament election: Glasgow
Party	Elected candidates	Seats	+/−	Votes	%	+/−%
Labour		0	N/A	112,588	43.9	N/A
SNP	Nicola Sturgeon; Dorothy-Grace Elder; Kenneth Gibson; Sandra White	4	N/A	65,360	25.5	N/A
Conservative	Bill Aitken	1	N/A	20,239	7.9	N/A
Scottish Socialist	Tommy Sheridan	1	N/A	18,581	7.2	N/A
Liberal Democrats	Robert Brown	1	N/A	18,473	7.2	N/A
Green		0	N/A	10,159	4.0	N/A
Socialist Labour		0	N/A	4,391	1.7	N/A
ProLife Alliance		0	N/A	2,357	0.9	N/A
Scottish Unionist		0	N/A	2,283	0.9	N/A
Communist		0	N/A	521	0.2	N/A
Humanist		0	N/A	447	0.2	N/A
Natural Law		0	N/A	419	0.2	N/A
Socialist (GB)		0	N/A	309	0.1	N/A
People's Choice		0	N/A	221	0.1	N/A

== See also ==
- Glasgow
  - Politics of Glasgow
- South Lanarkshire
- Renfrewshire

== Sources ==
- Glasgow City Council
