= All Saints Roman Catholic Secondary School =

All Saint's Secondary School

Location
- 299 Ryehill Road, Barmulloch; Glasgow; Scotland; 55.8861°N 4.2023°W

Information
- Type: Comprehensive, secondary
- Motto: Learning, Motivation, Success
- Religious affiliation: Roman Catholic
- Established: 1972
- Local authority: Glasgow City
- Headteacher: Brian McDermott
- Gender: mixed
- Age: 11 to 18
- Enrolment: 1,150
- Colours: Purple & Silver
- Website: http://www.allsaints-sec.glasgow.sch.uk

All Saints Roman Catholic Secondary School is a comprehensive, co-educational, Roman Catholic state school situated in Barmulloch the north-east of Glasgow, Scotland. Established in 1972, the school was rebuilt into a newer, more modern version in 2002, with better facilities but fewer classrooms. The headteacher is Brian McDermott.

== Notable former pupils ==
- Frank McAveety (born 1962) – Labour politician
- Paul Martin MSP (born 1967) – former Member of the Scottish Parliament for Glasgow Springburn constituency from 1999 to 2011 and Glasgow Provan from 2011 to 2016
- Allan Campbell (born 1998) – footballer who has played for the Scotland national football team
- Mouhamed Niang (born 1999) – professional footballer
