= Anne McLaughlin =

Scottish politician

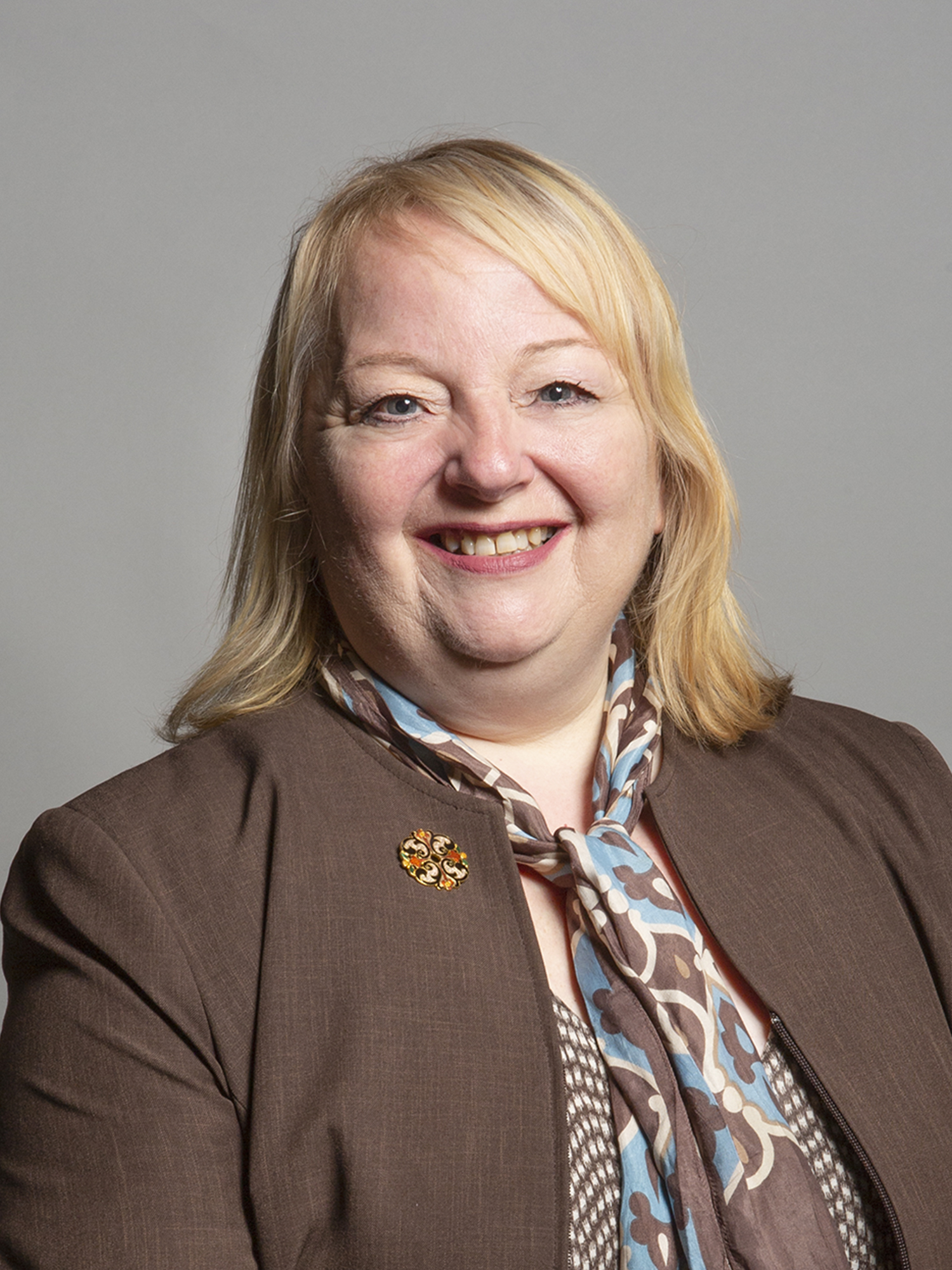
- Official portrait, 2019

SNP Spokesperson for International Development in the House of Commons
- In office 4 September 2023 – 5 July 2024
- Leader: Stephen Flynn
- Preceded by: Anum Qaisar
- Succeeded by: Office not in use

SNP Spokesperson for Justice and Immigration in the House of Commons
- In office 1 February 2021 – 10 December 2022
- Leader: Ian Blackford
- Preceded by: Joanna Cherry (Justice); Stuart McDonald (Immigration)
- Succeeded by: Stuart McDonald

Member of Parliament for Glasgow North East
- In office 12 December 2019 – 30 May 2024
- Preceded by: Paul Sweeney
- Succeeded by: Maureen Burke
- In office 7 May 2015 – 3 May 2017
- Preceded by: Willie Bain
- Succeeded by: Paul Sweeney

Member of the Scottish Parliament for Glasgow (1 of 7 Regional MSPs)
- In office 12 February 2009 – 22 March 2011
- Preceded by: Bashir Ahmad
- Succeeded by: Hanzala Malik

Personal details
- Born: 8 March 1966 (age 60) Greenock, Scotland
- Party: Scottish National Party
- Domestic partner: Graham Campbell

Anne McLaughlin (born 8 March 1966) is a Scottish National Party (SNP) politician who was the Member of Parliament (MP) for Glasgow North East from 2019 to 2024, and previously from 2015 to 2017. She was the SNP Spokesperson for International Development from 2023 to 2024.

== Early life and education ==
Anne McLaughlin was born on 8 March 1966 in Greenock. She attended Port Glasgow High School until 1984, then attended the Royal Scottish Academy of Music and Drama and the University of Glasgow. She joined the SNP after the 1988 Govan by-election.

== Political career ==
At the 2003 Scottish Parliament election, McLaughlin stood as the SNP candidate in Glasgow Rutherglen, coming third with 14.9% of the vote behind the incumbent Labour MSP Janis Hughes and the Liberal Democrat candidate Robert Brown.

McLaughlin stood in Glasgow Springburn at the 2007 Scottish Parliament election, coming second with 28% of the vote behind the incumbent Labour MSP Paul Martin.

McLaughlin became a regional member of the Scottish Parliament for Glasgow on 6 February 2009, following the death of Bashir Ahmad, as the next person on the SNP's regional list. Before this she was employed as a researcher for the MSP Bob Doris. She has championed the cause of English language skills in Glasgow school-children. She was a member of the Public Audit and Public Petitions parliamentary committees (2009–2011).

She stood in Glasgow Provan at the 2011 Scottish Parliament election, coming second with 34.7% of the vote behind the Labour candidate Paul Martin.

== Parliamentary career ==
McLaughlin stood in Glasgow Rutherglen at the 2001 general election, coming second with 14.1% of the vote behind the incumbent Labour MP Tommy McAvoy.

In June 2011 she was selected as the SNP candidate at the 2011 Inverclyde by-election. At the election, McLaughlin came second with 33% of the vote behind the Labour candidate Iain McKenzie.

At the 2015 general election, McLaughlin was elected to Parliament as MP for Glasgow North East with 58.1% of the vote and a majority of 9,222.

At the snap 2017 general election, McLaughlin was defeated, coming second with 42.2% of the vote behind the Labour candidate Paul Sweeney.

McLaughlin regained her seat of Glasgow North East at the 2019 general election, winning with 46.9% of the vote and a majority of 2,548.

In June 2024, McLaughlin was reselected as the SNP candidate for Glasgow North East at the 2024 general election. However, she was not re-elected, and lost to the Labour Party candidate Maureen Burke.

== Post-parliamentary career ==
Following her defeat at the 2024 UK General Election, McLaughlin unsuccessfully attempted to be an SNP candidate for the 2026 Scottish Parliamentary elections. She now works as a freelance consultant.

== Personal life ==
McLaughlin lives in Dennistoun. She has been in a long-term relationship with Glasgow City Council Councillor Graham Campbell.

Parliament of the United Kingdom
Preceded by Willie Bain	Member of Parliament for Glasgow North East; 2015–2017	Succeeded by Paul Sweeney
Preceded by Paul Sweeney	Member of Parliament for Glasgow North East; 2019–2024	Succeeded by Maureen Burke
