= Glasgow Springburn =

Glasgow Springburn may refer to:

- Glasgow Springburn (UK Parliament constituency)
- Glasgow Springburn (Scottish Parliament constituency)
- Glasgow Maryhill and Springburn (Scottish Parliament constituency)
