= Glasgow Provan =

Glasgow Provan may refer to:

- Glasgow Provan (Scottish Parliament constituency)
- Glasgow Provan (UK Parliament constituency)
