= Glasgow Easterhouse and Springburn =

Constituency of the Scottish Parliament

- Burgh constituency for the Scottish Parliament
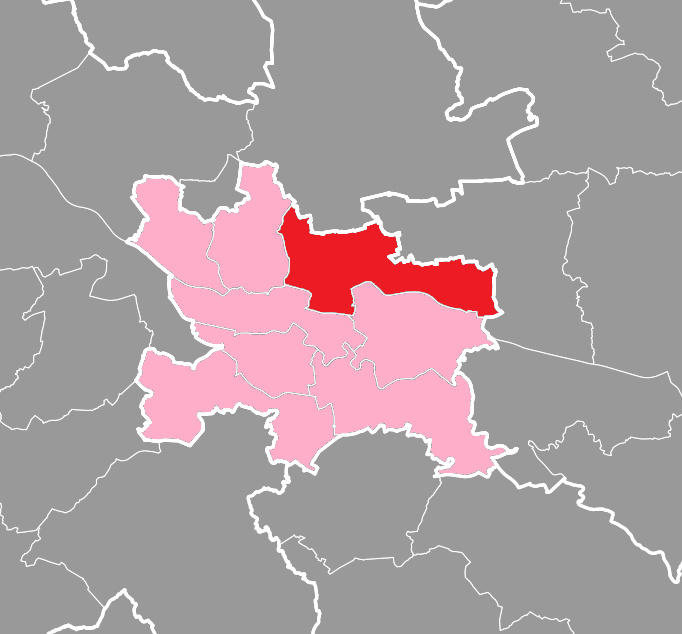

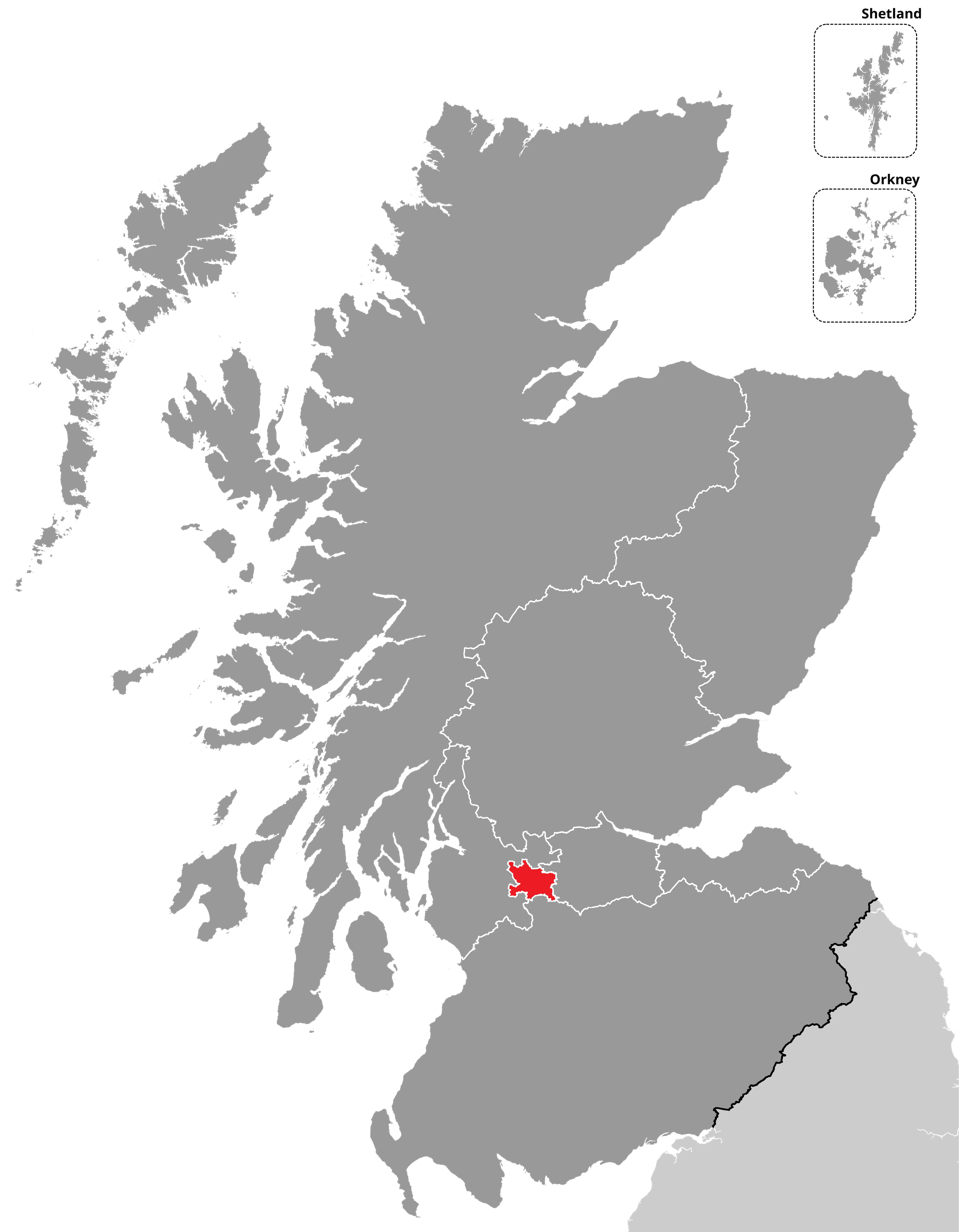
- Glasgow Easterhouse and Springburn shown within the Glasgow electoral region and the region shown within Scotland
- Electoral region: Glasgow
- Electorate: 60,358 (2026)
- Major settlements: Glasgow

Current constituency
- Created: 2026
- Seats: 1
- Party: Scottish National Party
- MSP: Ivan McKee
- Council area: City of Glasgow
- Created from: GlasgowMaryhill and Springburn, Glasgow Provan

Glasgow Easterhouse and Springburn is a burgh constituency of the Scottish Parliament covering part of the City of Glasgow. It elects one Member of the Scottish Parliament (MSP) by the first past the post method of election. Under the additional-member electoral system used for elections to the Scottish Parliament, it is also one of eight constituencies in the Glasgow electoral region, which elects seven additional members, in addition to eight constituency MSPs, to produce a form of proportional representation for the region as a whole. The seat was created at the second periodic review of Scottish Parliament boundaries in 2025, and was first contested at the 2026 Scottish Parliament election. It covers areas that were formerly within the constituencies of Glasgow Maryhill and Springburn and Glasgow Provan, which were abolished as a result of this review.

The constituency has been represented by Ivan McKee of the Scottish National Party since the 2026 election. McKee had served as the member for Glasgow Provan prior to this election.

== Electoral region ==
The other seven constituencies of the Glasgow region are Glasgow Anniesland, Glasgow Baillieston and Shettleston, Glasgow Cathcart and Pollok, Glasgow Central, Glasgow Kelvin and Maryhill, Glasgow Southside, and Rutherglen and Cambuslang. The region covers most of the Glasgow City council area, and a north-western portion of the South Lanarkshire council area.

== Constituency boundaries ==
Glasgow Easterhouse and Springburn is one of the eight constituencies covering the Glasgow City council area: Glasgow Anniesland, Glasgow Baillieston and Shettleston, Glasgow Cathcart and Pollok, Glasgow Central, Glasgow Easterhouse and Springburn, Glasgow Kelvin and Maryhill, Glasgow Southside, and Renfrewshire North and Cardonald (the latter also covering part of the Renfrewshire council area). The following electoral wards were used to define Glasgow Easterhouse and Springburn:

- Canal (Shared with Glasgow Kelvin and Maryhill)
- Springburn/Robroyston (entire ward)
- North East (entire ward)
- Dennistoun (entire ward)

== Member of the Scottish Parliament ==
Election	Member	Party
2026	Ivan McKee	SNP

== Election results ==
=== 2020s ===
2026 Scottish Parliament election: Glasgow Easterhouse and Springburn (Note: Note that changes in vote share are shown with respect to the notional result of the 2021 election, calculated to account for boundary changes)
Party	Candidate	Constituency			Regional		
Party	Candidate	Votes	%	±%	Votes	%	±%
SNP	Ivan McKee (Note: Incumbent member on the party list, or for another constituency)	11,926	46.2	▼11.2	7,606	29.4	▼18.9
Green					5,223	20.2	▲10.8
Reform	Audrey Dempsey	5,309	20.6	New	5,016	19.4	▲19.2
Labour Co-op	Paul Sweeney (Note: Sweeney is standing on a joint ticket on behalf of Scottish Labour and the Scottish Co-operative Party.)	6,772	26.2	▼1.5	4,957	19.1	▼7.5
Conservative	Josephine Macleod	706	2.7	▼5.1	762	2.9	▼5.7
Liberal Democrats	Nicholas Moohan	788	3.1	▲1.4	614	2.4	▲1.2
AtLS					386	1.5	
Independent Green Voice					346	1.3	
Independent	Craig Houston				255	1.0	
Scottish Family					155	0.6	
ISP					138	0.5	
Scottish Socialist					137	0.5	
Scottish Christian					88	0.3	
Scottish Common Party	Kenneth Nwosu	301	1.2	New	77	0.3	
Workers Party					71	0.3	
Independent	Elspeth Kerr				40	0.2	
UKIP					29	0.1	
Majority		6,617	20.0				
Valid votes		25,802			25,900		
Invalid votes		164			97		
Turnout		25,802	43.0		25,997	43.1	
SNP win (new seat)							

== See also ==
- List of Scottish Parliament constituencies and electoral regions (2026–)
- Politics of Glasgow
- Glasgow Springburn (Scottish Parliament constituency)
