= Iris Duane =

Scottish politician

Iris Duane MSP
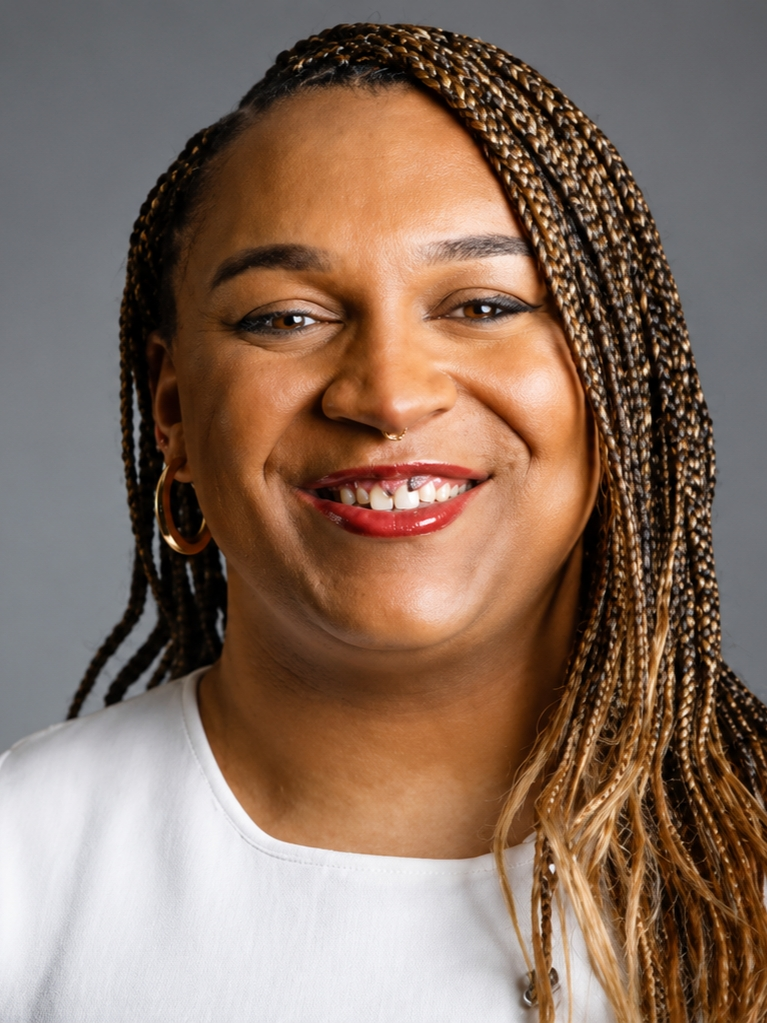
- Official portrait, 2026

Member of the Scottish Parliament for Glasgow (1 of 7 Regional MSPs)
- Incumbent
- Assumed office 7 May 2026

Personal details
- Born: 2002 or 2003 (age 23–24) Bradford, England
- Party: Scottish Greens
- Education: University of Glasgow

Iris Duane (born 2002 or 2003) is a Scottish Greens politician who has been a Member of the Scottish Parliament (MSP) for the Glasgow region since 2026.

== Early life ==
Duane grew up in Bradford, England, the child of a single Black mother. Her politics were shaped by her working class background; Duane's mother worked multiple jobs while attending sixth form college.

== Political career ==
Duane joined the Scottish Green Party shortly after moving to Glasgow North to read politics and social policy at the University of Glasgow. She became the university's first openly transgender sabbatical officer after pledging to lobby for drug testing kits for students and obstruct investments in the arms trade, and also served as Vice-President of the Queen Margaret Union during the 2023–24 academic year and as Vice-President of Student Support for the Glasgow University Students' Representative Council in 2024. In 2023, Duane was included in Young Women Scotland's "30 Under 30" list. She stood for the Green Party in the Glasgow North constituency in the 2024 general election, placing third.

In 2026, while still studying at the University of Glasgow, Duane stood in the 2026 Scottish Parliament election for the Glasgow Kelvin and Maryhill seat. The party credited her with tackling her country's poor housing affordability and with advocating for nationalising public transport. She finished second behind Bob Doris but was elected as a member of the Scottish Parliament for the Glasgow region. Duane and fellow Green MSP Q Manivannan are the first openly transgender people elected to the Scottish Parliament, and the Green Party criticised the abuse the pair received following their election. That June, Duane then attended a Glasgow Stand Up to Racism demonstration against the far-right riots that had recently taken place in the area.
