= Rutherglen (Scottish Parliament constituency) =

Scottish Parliament constituency

- Former burgh constituency for the Scottish Parliament

- Rutherglen shown within the Glasgow electoral region and the region shown within Scotland
- Population: 77,568 (2019)

Former constituency
- Created: 2011
- Abolished: 2026
- Council area: South Lanarkshire
- Created from: Glasgow Rutherglen
- Replaced by: Rutherglen and Cambuslang

Rutherglen was a constituency of the Scottish Parliament covering part of the council area of South Lanarkshire. Under the additional-member system used for elections to the Scottish Parliament, the seat elected one Member of the Scottish Parliament (MSP) by the plurality (first past the post) method of election, and was also one of nine constituencies in the Glasgow electoral region, which elected seven additional members, in addition to the nine constituency MSPs, to produce a form of proportional representation for the region as a whole. Originally called Glasgow Rutherglen, the boundaries were altered and the new constituency renamed simply Rutherglen ahead of the 2011 Scottish Parliament election.

As a result of the second periodic review of Scottish Parliament boundaries in 2025, Rutherglen was replaced by a new Rutherglen and Cambuslang constituency ahead of the 2026 Scottish Parliament election. The new constituency covers the entire area of the former Rutherglen constituency, along with a very small portion of Uddingston and Bellshill.

The seat was held by Clare Haughey of the Scottish National Party from the 2016 Scottish Parliament election until its abolition.

== Electoral region ==
During the period the Rutherglen constituency was in existence, the other eight constituencies of the Glasgow region were: Glasgow Anniesland, Glasgow Cathcart, Glasgow Kelvin, Glasgow Maryhill and Springburn, Glasgow Pollok, Glasgow Provan, Glasgow Shettleston and Glasgow Southside.

In this period the region covered the Glasgow City council area and a north-western portion of the South Lanarkshire council area.

== Constituency boundaries and council areas ==
Map of boundaries 2011-2026

The boundaries of the seat were altered by the first periodic review of Scottish Parliament boundaries; the first election under these new boundaries was the 2011 Scottish Parliament election. The following electoral wards of South Lanarkshire Council were used to define Rutherglen at this review:

- In full: Rutherglen South; Rutherglen Central and North; Cambuslang West; Cambuslang East
- In part: Blantyre (shared with Uddingston and Bellshill)

=== Constituency profile ===
The BBC provided the following profile of the Rutherglen constituency as part of its coverage of the 2016 election:

Rutherglen was once a burgh - the oldest in Scotland - until local government reorganisation in 1975, and lies to the south east of Glasgow city centre. The name Rutherglen is said to come from Gaelic for "reddish glen" after the red clay found here. At its northern border it blends into Glasgow's suburbs, though the town has always striven to maintain a distinct identity from Glasgow, which it predates by 500 years. The seat includes not only Rutherglen itself but also the town of Cambuslang, Burnside and the housing scheme at Fernhill, as well as Blantyre, all of which lie within the local government control of South Lanarkshire. Steel and pottery have been major industries in the past, but both have been in decline. Janis Hughes won the seat for the Labour Party in the 1999 and 2003 elections. James Kelly then held the seat in 2007 and 2011.

— BBC News

== Member of the Scottish Parliament ==
Election	Member	Party
2011	James Kelly	Labour
2016	Clare Haughey	SNP

== Election results ==
=== 2020s ===
2021 Scottish Parliament election: Rutherglen
Party	Candidate	Constituency			Regional		
Party	Candidate	Votes	%	±%	Votes	%	±%
SNP	Clare Haughey (Note: Incumbent member for this constituency)	20,249	50.5	▲4.3	16,970	42.3	▼0.8
Labour Co-op	James Kelly (Note: Kelly stood on a joint ticket on behalf of Scottish Labour and the Scottish Co-operative Party. The regional list vote was for Scottish Labour only.) (Note: Incumbent member on the party list, or for another constituency)	15,083	37.6	▲2.8	11,005	27.4	▼1.0
Conservative	Lynne Nailon	3,663	9.1	▼2.2	5,903	14.7	▲1.8
Green					2,883	7.2	▲2.5
Liberal Democrats	Sheila Thomson	1,112	2.8	▼4.9	1,011	2.5	▼1.6
Alba					710	1.8	New
All for Unity					356	0.9	New
Independent Green Voice					273	0.7	New
Scottish Libertarian					222	0.6	New
Scottish Family					204	0.5	New
Reform					104	0.3	New
Abolish the Scottish Parliament					95	0.2	New
Freedom Alliance (UK)					88	0.2	New
Women's Equality					74	0.2	▼0.4
Communist					61	0.2	New
TUSC					59	0.1	New
UKIP					52	0.1	▼2.1
Independent	Craig Ross				35	0.1	New
SDP					17	0.0	New
Reclaim					14	0.0	New
Independent	Daniel Donaldson				10	0.0	New
Renew					8	0.0	New
Majority		5,166	12.9	▲1.5			
Valid votes		40,107			40,154		
Invalid votes		162			82		
Turnout		40,269	63.5	▲9.0	40,236	63.3	▲8.8
SNP hold		Swing		▲3.6			

=== 2010s ===
2016 Scottish Parliament election: Rutherglen
Party	Candidate	Constituency			Regional		
Party	Candidate	Votes	%	±%	Votes	%	±%
SNP	Clare Haughey	15,222	46.2	▲6.7	14,256	43.1	▲4.1
Labour Co-op	James Kelly (Note: Kelly stood on a joint ticket on behalf of Scottish Labour and the Scottish Co-operative Party. The regional list vote was for Scottish Labour only.) (Note: Incumbent member for this constituency)	11,479	34.8	▼11.3	9,372	28.4	▼10.0
Conservative	Taylor Muir	3,718	11.3	▲3.6	4,269	12.9	▲6.2
Green					1,555	4.7	▲2.1
Liberal Democrats	Robert Brown	2,533	7.7	▲3.3	1,351	4.1	▲1.1
UKIP					719	2.2	▲1.7
Solidarity					405	1.2	New
BUP					336	1.0	New
Animal Welfare					213	0.6	New
RISE					202	0.6	New
Women's Equality					188	0.6	New
Scottish Christian					161	0.5	▼0.3
Independent	Andrew McCullagh				29	0.1	New
Majority		3,743	11.4	N/A			
Valid votes		32,952			33,056		
Invalid votes		135			56		
Turnout		33,087	54.5	▲7.4	33,112	54.5	▲7.4
SNP gain from Labour Co-op		Swing		▲9.0			
Notes

2011 Scottish Parliament election: Rutherglen
Party	Candidate	Constituency			Regional		
Party	Candidate	Votes	%	±%	Votes	%	±%
Labour Co-op	James Kelly (Note: Kelly stood on a joint ticket on behalf of Scottish Labour and the Scottish Co-operative Party. The regional list vote is for Scottish Labour only.) (Note: Incumbent member for the Glasgow Rutherglen constituency)	12,489	46.1	N/A	10,411	38.4	N/A
SNP	James McGuigan	10,710	39.5	N/A	10,587	39.0	N/A
Conservative	Martyn McIntyre	2,096	7.7	N/A	1,807	6.7	N/A
Liberal Democrats	Lisa Strachan	1,174	4.4	N/A	815	3.0	N/A
Green					710	2.6	N/A
Respect					637	2.3	N/A
All-Scotland Pensioners Party					513	1.9	N/A
BNP					363	1.3	N/A
Scottish Unionist					294	1.1	N/A
Socialist Labour					274	1.0	N/A
Scottish Christian					206	0.8	N/A
Scottish Socialist					143	0.5	N/A
UKIP					142	0.5	N/A
Independent	Caroline Johnstone	633	2.3	N/A	127	0.5	N/A
Pirate					54	0.2	N/A
Scottish Homeland Party					30	0.1	N/A
Majority		1,779	6.6	N/A			
Valid votes		27,102			27,113		
Invalid votes		94			82		
Turnout		27,196	47.1	N/A	27,195	47.1	N/A
Labour Co-op win (new seat)							
Notes

- Previous elections: See Glasgow Rutherglen.
