= Zen Ghani =

Scottish politician

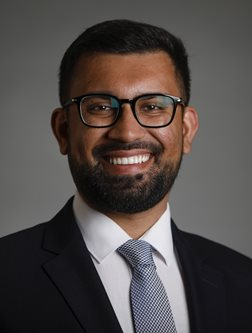
- Official portrait, 2026

Member of the Scottish Parliament for Glasgow Cathcart and Pollok
- Incumbent
- Assumed office 7 May 2026
- Preceded by: constituency established
- Majority: 5,163 (20.0%)

Personal details
- Born: 2001 (age 24–25)
- Party: Scottish National Party

Zen Ghani (born 2001) is a Scottish politician who has served as Member of the Scottish Parliament (MSP) for Glasgow Cathcart and Pollok since 2026.

== Biography ==
Ghani grew up in kinship care in the Southside of Glasgow and has spoken publicly about using free school meals at Shawlands Academy as a child. Ghani studied at the University of Glasgow, graduating in 2023 with a MA (Hons) in Politics and History.

In the 2022 Glasgow City Council election, Ghani was elected to represent Pollokshields ward on Glasgow City Council, becoming the youngest councillor in the city and the only SNP gain in the city. His term began on 5 May 2022 and is scheduled to run until 6 May 2027. In 2025, he was given the Al Ihsan Award for Public Service at the Scottish Muslim Awards.

At the 2026 Scottish Parliament election, Ghani was elected as the Scottish National Party MSP for the Glasgow Cathcart and Pollok constituency, defeating Scottish Labour leader Anas Sarwar. Ghani received 14,270 votes to Sarwar's 9,107, giving him a majority of 5,163. He had also stood on the Glasgow regional list, where he was placed eighth.
