= Glasgow Cathcart and Pollok =

Constituency of the Scottish Parliament

- Burgh constituency for the Scottish Parliament
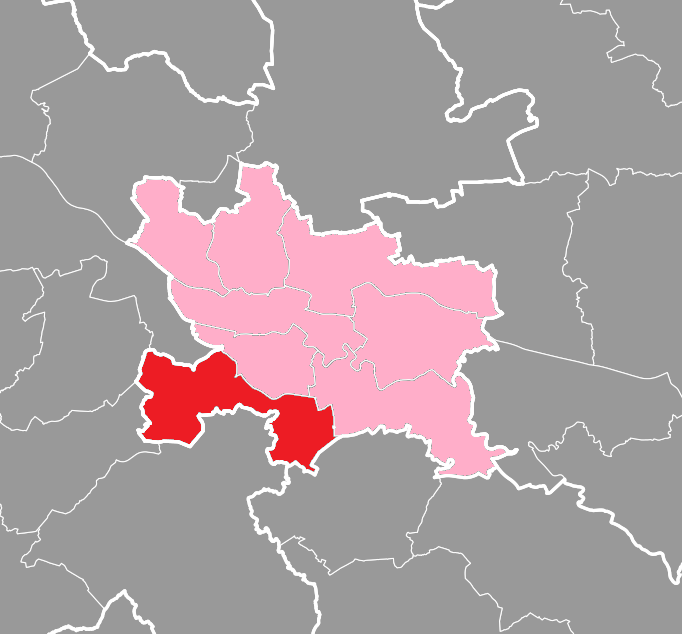

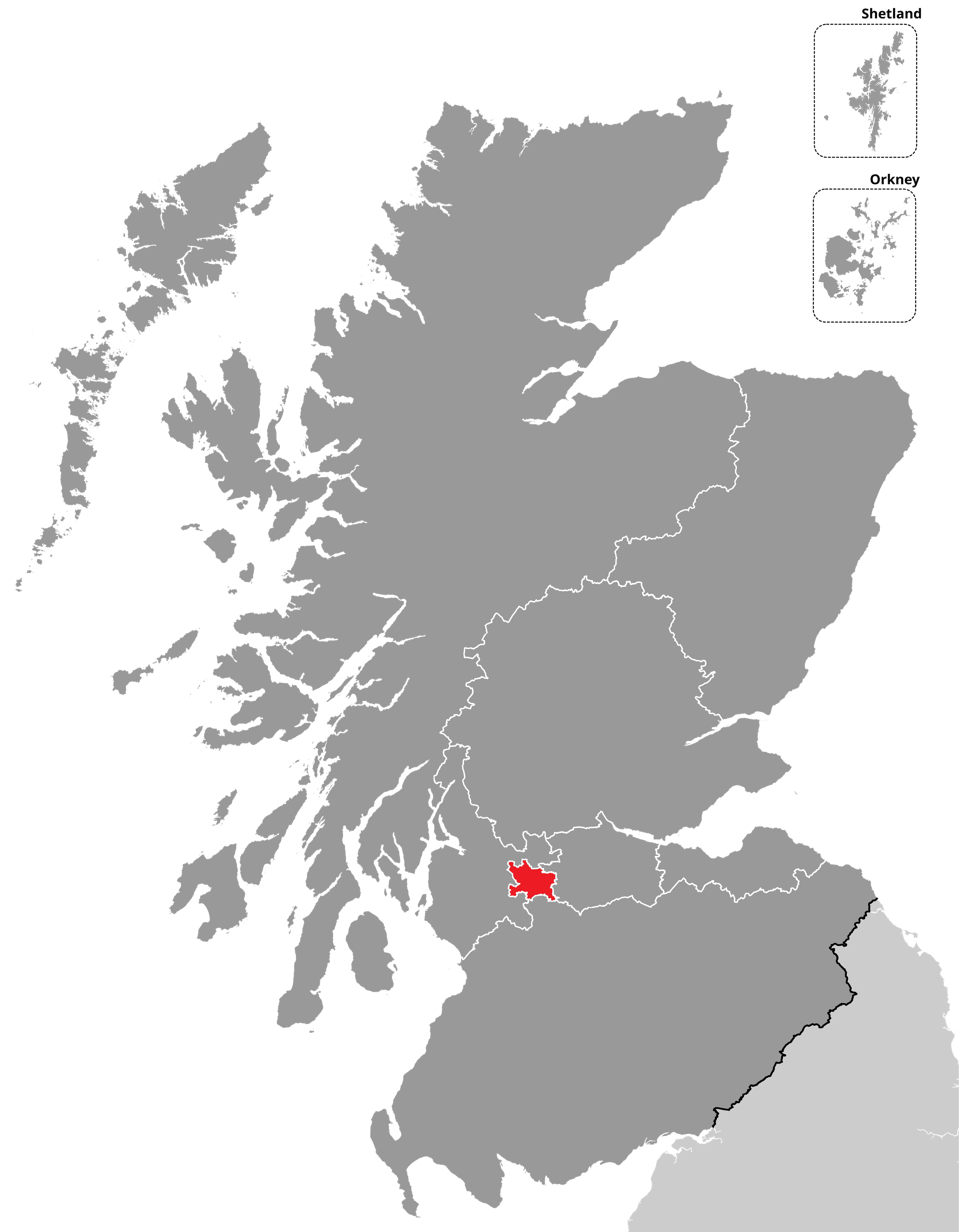
- Glasgow Cathcart and Pollok shown within the Glasgow electoral region and the region shown within Scotland
- Electoral region: Glasgow
- Electorate: 66,271 (2026)
- Major settlements: Glasgow

Current constituency
- Created: 2026
- Seats: 1
- Party: Scottish National Party
- MSP: Zen Ghani
- Council area: City of Glasgow
- Created from: Glasgow Cathcart and Glasgow Pollok

Glasgow Cathcart and Pollok is a burgh constituency of the Scottish Parliament covering part of the council area of Glasgow. It elects one Member of the Scottish Parliament (MSP) by the first past the post method of election. Under the additional-member electoral system used for elections to the Scottish Parliament, it is also one of eight constituencies in the Glasgow electoral region, which elects seven additional members, in addition to eight constituency MSPs, to produce a form of proportional representation for the region as a whole. The seat was created at the second periodic review of Scottish Parliament boundaries in 2025, and was first contested at the 2026 Scottish Parliament election. It covers areas that were formerly within the constituencies of Glasgow Cathcart and Glasgow Pollok, which were abolished as a result of this review.

The constituency has been represented by Zen Ghani of the Scottish National Party since the 2026 election.

== Electoral region ==
The other seven constituencies of the Glasgow region are Glasgow Anniesland, Glasgow Baillieston and Shettleston, Glasgow Central, Glasgow Easterhouse and Springburn, Glasgow Kelvin and Maryhill, Glasgow Southside, and Rutherglen and Cambuslang. The region covers most of the Glasgow City council area, and a north-western portion of the South Lanarkshire council area.

== Constituency boundaries ==
Glasgow Cathcart and Pollok is one of the eight constituencies covering the Glasgow City council area: Glasgow Anniesland, Glasgow Baillieston and Shettleston, Glasgow Cathcart and Pollok, Glasgow Central, Glasgow Easterhouse and Springburn, Glasgow Kelvin and Maryhill, Glasgow Southside, and Renfrewshire North and Cardonald (the latter also covering part of the Renfrewshire council area). The following electoral wards were used to defined Glasgow Cathcart and Pollok:

- Linn (entire ward)
- Newlands/Auldburn (entire ward)
- Greater Pollok (entire ward)

== Member of the Scottish Parliament ==
Election	Member	Party
2026	Zen Ghani	SNP

== Election results ==
=== 2020s ===
2026 Scottish Parliament election: Glasgow Cathcart and Pollok (Note: Note that changes in vote share are shown with respect to the notional result of the 2021 election, calculated to account for boundary changes)
Party	Candidate	Constituency			Regional		
Party	Candidate	Votes	%	±%	Votes	%	±%
SNP	Zen Ghani	14,270	44.3	▼10.2	9,119	28.1	▼17.4
Labour	Anas Sarwar (Note: Sarwar is standing on a joint ticket on behalf of Scottish Labour and the Scottish Co-operative Party.) (Note: Incumbent member on the party list, or for another constituency)	9,107	28.3	▼4.1	7,208	22.2	▼4.7
Green					5,696	18.2	▲11.8
Reform	Kim Schmulian (Note: Elected on the party list)	5,320	16.5	New	5,292	16.3	▲16.1
Conservative	Kyle Park	1,325	4.1	▼4.3	1,535	4.7	▼8.6
Liberal Democrats	Peter McLaughlin	1,407	4.4	▲2.1	1,171	3.6	▲1.5
AtLS					483	1.5	
Independent Green Voice					417	1.3	
Independent	Craig Houston				287	0.9	
Scottish Family					254	0.8	
Workers Party	Yvonne Ridley	586	1.8	New	232	0.7	
ISP					192	0.6	
Scottish Socialist					136	0.4	
Scottish Christian					102	0.3	
Scottish Common Party	Adnan Rafiq	163	0.5	New	82	0.3	
Independent	Elspeth Kerr				40	0.1	
UKIP					34	0.1	
Majority		5,163	16.0	N/A			
Valid votes		32,178			32,280		
Invalid votes		210			116		
Turnout		32,388	48.9	N/A	32,396	48.9	
SNP win (new seat)							

== See also ==
- List of Scottish Parliament constituencies and electoral regions (2026–)
- Politics of Glasgow
- Glasgow Cathcart (Scottish Parliament constituency)
- Glasgow Pollok (Scottish Parliament constituency)
