= Rutherglen and Cambuslang =

Constituency of the Scottish Parliament

- Burgh constituency for the Scottish Parliament
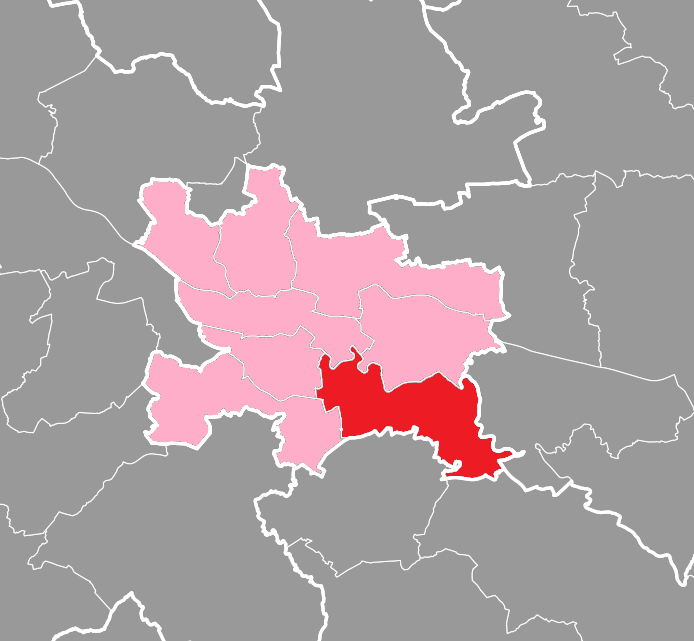

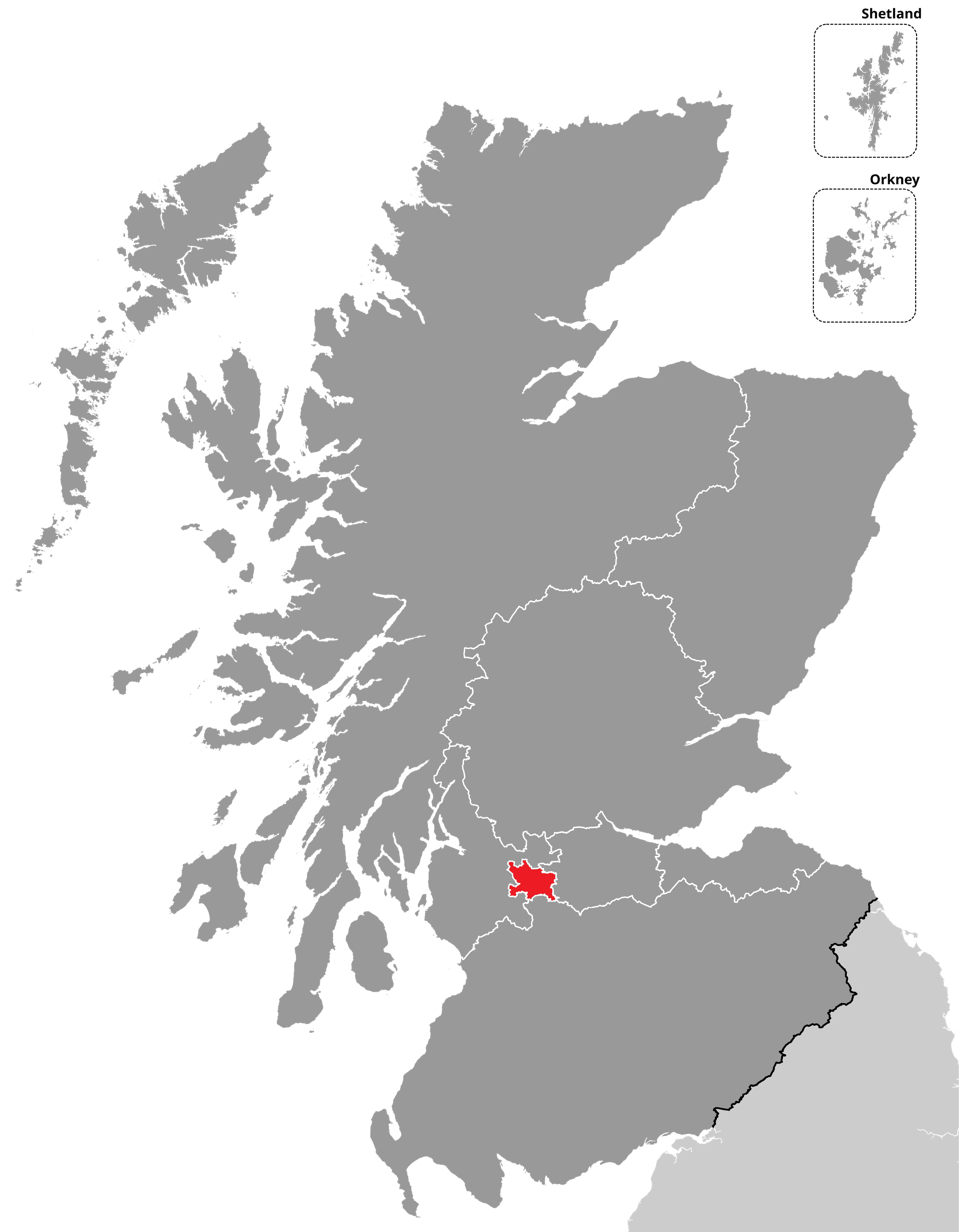
- Rutherglen and Cambuslang shown within the Glasgow electoral region and the region shown within Scotland
- Electoral region: Glasgow
- Electorate: 64,901 (2026)
- Major settlements: Rutherglen, Cambuslang, Blantyre

Current constituency
- Created: 2026
- Seats: 1
- Party: Scottish National Party
- MSP: Clare Haughey
- Council area: South Lanarkshire
- Created from: Rutherglen, Uddingston and Bellshill

Rutherglen and Cambuslang is a constituency of the Scottish Parliament covering part of the council area of South Lanarkshire. It elects one Member of the Scottish Parliament (MSP) by the first past the post method of election. Under the additional-member electoral system used for elections to the Scottish Parliament, it is also one of eight constituencies in the Glasgow electoral region, which elects seven additional members, in addition to eight constituency MSPs, to produce a form of proportional representation for the region as a whole.

The seat was created at the second periodic review of Scottish Parliament boundaries in 2025, and covers the area of the former Rutherglen constituency, along with a very small portion of the Uddingston and Bellshill constituency. It was first contested at the 2026 Scottish Parliament election, when it was won by Clare Haughey of the Scottish National Party: Haughey was the incumbent member for the former seat of Rutherglen prior to this election.

== Electoral region ==
The other seven constituencies of the Glasgow region are Glasgow Anniesland, Glasgow Baillieston and Shettleston, Glasgow Cathcart and Pollok, Glasgow Central, Glasgow Easterhouse and Springburn, Glasgow Kelvin and Maryhill, and Glasgow Southside. The region covers most of the Glasgow City council area, and a north-western portion of the South Lanarkshire council area.

== Boundaries ==
As the name suggests, Rutherglen and Cambuslang covers the adjoining towns of Rutherglen and Cambuslang as well as the separate and smaller town of Blantyre, all of which are situated within the South Lanarkshire local authority area. Its boundaries are similar to those of the 2011–2026 Rutherglen constituency, with the name change recommended by Boundaries Scotland to differentiate it from the Rutherglen constituency of the UK Parliament which had been re-introduced in 2024 (and covers a similar but wider area, also including Bothwell and Uddingston). Rutherglen and Cambuslang is one of the five constituencies covering South Lanarkshire, alongside Clydesdale, East Kilbride, Hamilton, Larkhall and Stonehouse, and Uddingston and Bellshill - the latter also incorporating part of North Lanarkshire.

The following electoral wards of South Lanarkshire Council were used to define Rutherglen and Cambuslang:

- Rutherglen South (entire ward)
- Rutherglen Central and North (entire ward)
- Cambuslang West (entire ward)
- Cambuslang East (entire ward)
- Blantyre (entire ward)
- Hamilton North and East (Shared with Uddingston and Bellshill)

== Member of the Scottish Parliament ==
Election	Member	Party
2026	Clare Haughey	SNP

== Election results ==
=== 2020s ===
2026 Scottish Parliament election: Rutherglen and Cambuslang (Note: Note that changes in vote share are shown with respect to the notional result of the 2021 election, calculated to account for boundary changes)
Party	Candidate	Constituency			Regional		
Party	Candidate	Votes	%	±%	Votes	%	±%
SNP	Clare Haughey (Note: Incumbent member on the party list, or for another constituency)	14,969	44.2	▼6.3	10,138	29.8	
Labour	Monica Lennon (Note: Lennon stood on a joint ticket on behalf of Scottish Labour and the Scottish Co-operative Party)	9,125	26.9	▼10.7	7,411	21.8	
Reform	Allan Lyons	6,168	18.2	New	6,437	18.9	
Green					4,604	13.5	
Liberal Democrats	Patrick Logue	1,833	5.4	▲2.6	1,798	5.3	
Conservative	Annie Wells	1,321	3.9	▼5.2	1,682	4.9	
TUSC	Chris Sermanni	467	1.4	New			
AtLS					382	1.1	
Independent Green Voice					379	1.1	
Scottish Family					260	0.8	
Scottish Socialist					227	0.7	
Independent	Craig Houston				200	0.6	
ISP					177	0.5	
Scottish Christian					111	0.3	
Workers Party					90	0.3	
Independent	Elspeth Kerr				42	0.1	
Scottish Common Party					25	0.1	
UKIP					24	0.1	
Majority		5,844	17.2				
Valid votes		33,883			33,987		
Invalid votes		167			113		
Turnout		34,050	52.5		34,100	52.5	
SNP win (new seat)							

== See also ==
- List of Scottish Parliament constituencies and electoral regions (2026–)
