= Bashir Ahmad (Scottish politician) =

Scottish National Party politician (1940–2009)

Member of the Scottish Parliament for Glasgow (1 of 7 Regional MSPs)
- In office 3 May 2007 – 6 February 2009
- Succeeded by: Anne McLaughlin

Personal details
- Born: 12 February 1940 Amritsar, British India
- Died: 6 February 2009 (aged 68) Glasgow, Scotland
- Party: Scottish National Party
- Spouse: Naseem Ahmad
- Children: 7

Bashir Ahmad (12 February 1940 – 6 February 2009) was an entrepreneur and a Scottish National Party politician. He was first elected as a Member of the Scottish Parliament (MSP) for the Glasgow region at the 2007 election, and was the first MSP to be elected from a South Asian and Muslim background.

== Early life ==
Ahmad was born in Amritsar, British India on 12 February 1940. In 1951, at the age of 11, his family emigrated to Scotland from Pakistan. He served five terms as President of the Pakistan Welfare Association.

== Political career ==
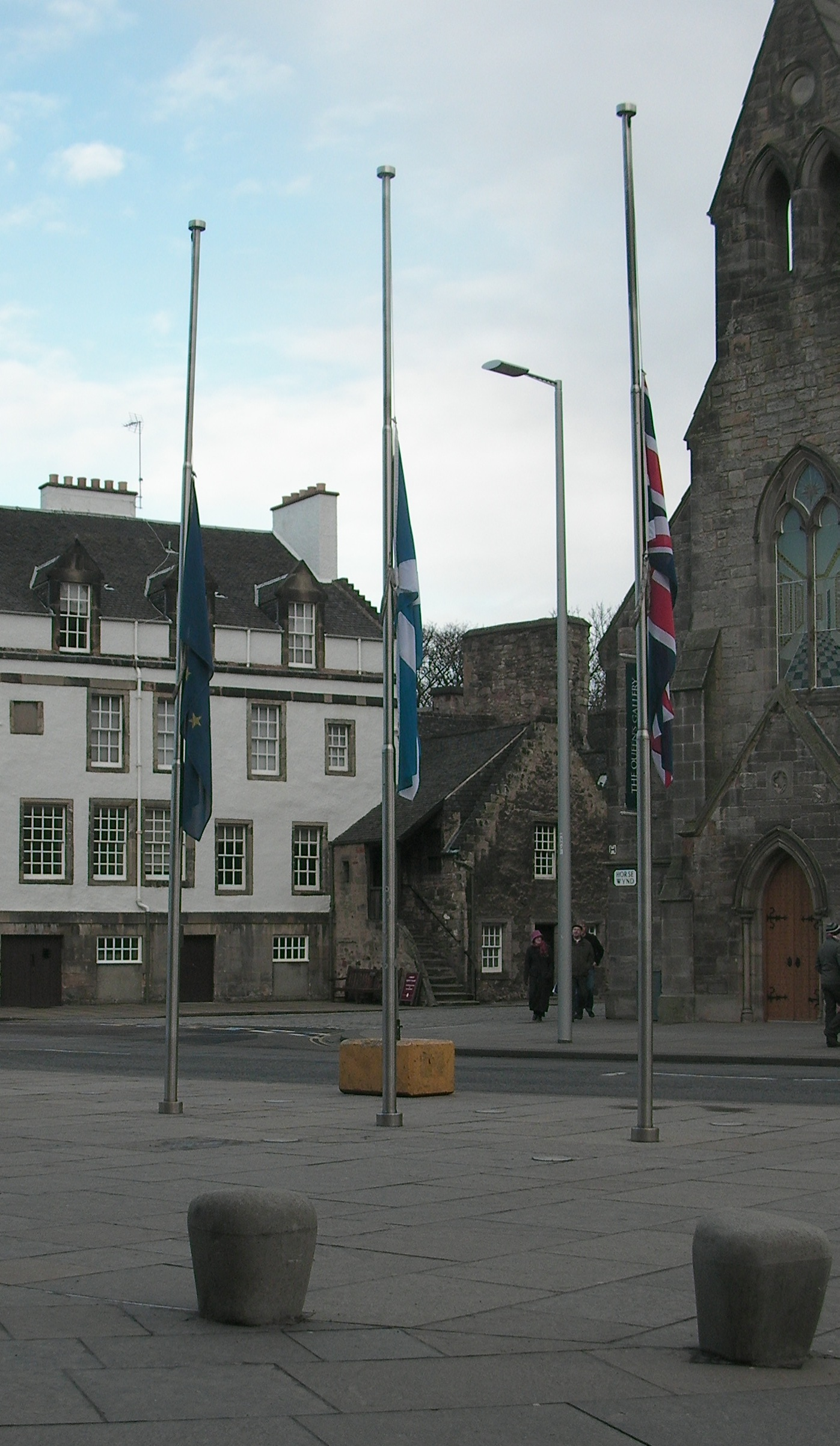
Flags outside the Scottish Parliament flying at half-mast following the death of Bashir Ahmad MSP

Ahmad joined the Scottish National Party in 1992. In 1995, he founded Asian Scots for Independence to attract more Asian-Scots to the party. When Bashir launched Scots Asians for Independence at the SNP conference in 1995, he gave a speech saying "it isn't important where you come from, what matters is where we are going together as a nation".

He retired from business in 2003 to devote himself to politics. In 2003, he defeated the Labour candidate to become the Councillor for the Pollokshields East ward.

Upon his selection as second on the SNP's Glasgow list, Ahmad said: "The lack of any Asian or ethnic minority voice in the Scottish Parliament has been felt deeply in my community. But SNP members have righted that wrong. By doing so, they have proved that the SNP aspires to lead a Scottish Parliament that will represent all of Scotland – a truly national parliament. I firmly believe the SNP can now earn the trust of the Asian community throughout Scotland and that this will be a bond that endures for generations."

At the 2007 Scottish Parliament election, Ahmad was elected to the Scottish Parliament on the Glasgow regional list. He thus became the first non-white and first Muslim MSP. On the opening day of the 3rd Scottish Parliament, he wore traditional Pakistani clothing and took his oath of office in both the Urdu and English languages.

Ahmad led the bill on making forced marriage a criminal offence in Scotland and participated in a humanitarian campaign for Scottish hospitals to treat the most serious casualties of Israel's attacks on the Gaza Strip, particularly women and children with life-threatening burns or other wounds. He was a member of the Scottish Parliament's Public Petitions Committee, which decides which action should be taken on petitions submitted by individuals, groups or organisations.

== Death ==
Ahmad died of a heart attack on 6 February 2009 at the age of 68. His funeral was held at the Glasgow Central Mosque and he was buried in Cathcart Cemetery.

== Family life ==
Bashir is survived by his wife Naseem, their five daughters, two sons and 11 grandchildren.
