= Glasgow Kelvin and Maryhill =

Constituency of the Scottish Parliament

- Burgh constituency for the Scottish Parliament
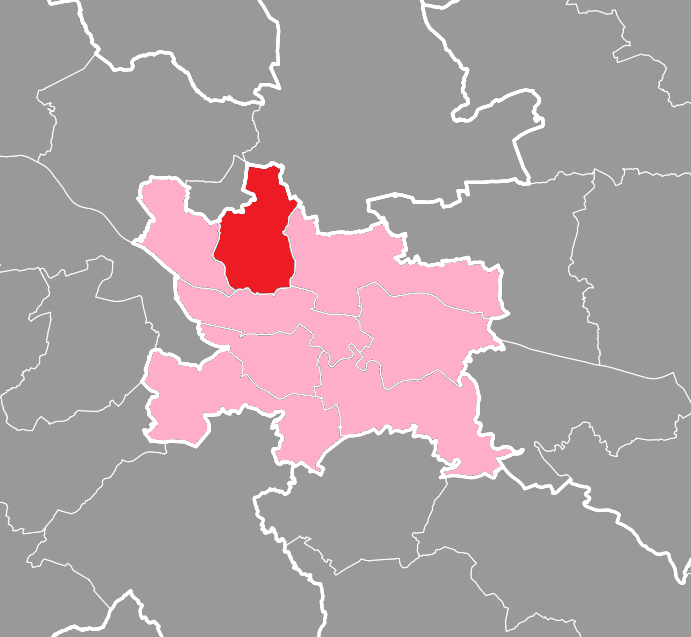

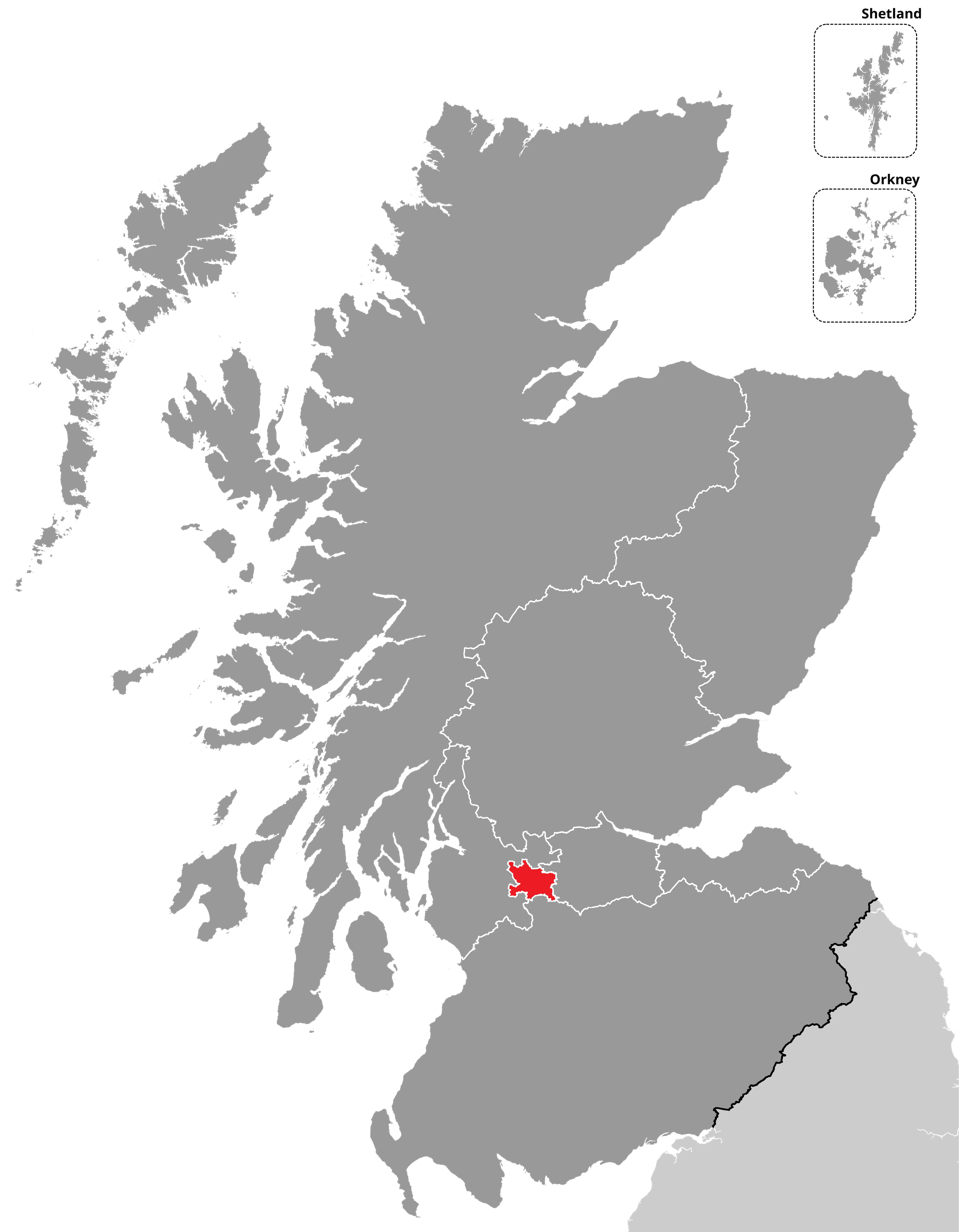
- Glasgow Kelvin and Maryhill shown within the Glasgow electoral region and the region shown within Scotland
- Electoral region: Glasgow
- Electorate: 62,327 (2026)
- Major settlements: Glasgow

Current constituency
- Created: 2026
- Seats: 1
- Party: Scottish National Party
- MSP: Bob Doris
- Council area: City of Glasgow
- Created from: Glasgow Kelvin and Glasgow Maryhill and Springburn

Glasgow Kelvin and Maryhill is a burgh constituency of the Scottish Parliament covering part of the City of Glasgow. It elects one Member of the Scottish Parliament (MSP) by the first past the post method of election. Under the additional-member electoral system used for elections to the Scottish Parliament, it is also one of eight constituencies in the Glasgow electoral region, which elects seven additional members, in addition to eight constituency MSPs, to produce a form of proportional representation for the region as a whole.

The seat was created at the second periodic review of Scottish Parliament boundaries in 2025, and was first contested at the 2026 Scottish Parliament election. It covers areas that were formerly within the constituencies of Glasgow Kelvin and Glasgow Maryhill and Springburn, which were abolished as a result of this review.

When first contested the seat was won by Bob Doris of the Scottish National Party (SNP). Prior to this election Doris had been the incumbent member for Glasgow Maryhill and Springburn.

== Electoral region ==
The other seven constituencies of the Glasgow region are Glasgow Anniesland, Glasgow Baillieston and Shettleston, Glasgow Cathcart and Pollok, Glasgow Central, Glasgow Easterhouse and Springburn, Glasgow Southside, and Rutherglen and Cambuslang. The region covers most of the Glasgow City council area, and a north-western portion of the South Lanarkshire council area.

== Constituency boundaries ==
Glasgow Kelvin and Maryhill is one of the eight constituencies covering the Glasgow City council area: Glasgow Anniesland, Glasgow Baillieston and Shettleston, Glasgow Cathcart and Pollok, Glasgow Central, Glasgow Easterhouse and Springburn, Glasgow Kelvin and Maryhill, Glasgow Southside, and Renfrewshire North and Cardonald (the latter also covering part of the Renfrewshire council area). The following electoral wards were used to define Glasgow Kelvin and Maryhill:

- Hillhead (entire ward)
- Maryhill (entire ward)
- Canal (Shared with Glasgow Easterhouse and Springburn)
- Partick East/Kelvindale (entire ward)

== Member of the Scottish Parliament ==
Election	Member	Party
2026	Bob Doris	SNP

== Election results ==
=== 2020s ===
2026 Scottish Parliament election: Glasgow Kelvin and Maryhill (Note: Note that changes in vote share are shown with respect to the notional result of the 2021 election, calculated to account for boundary changes)
Party	Candidate	Constituency			Regional		
Party	Candidate	Votes	%	±%	Votes	%	±%
SNP	Bob Doris (Note: Incumbent member on the party list, or for another constituency)	11,174	32.8	▼12.5	8,712	25.6	▼14.5
Green	Iris Duane (Note: Elected on the party list)	9,003	26.4	▲11.4	10,502	30.8	▲12.7
Labour	James Adams	7,531	22.1	▼5.7	6,198	18.2	▼2.6
Reform	Aimee Alexander	3,592	10.5	New	3,713	10.9	▲10.7
Liberal Democrats	Daniel Khan-O'Malley	1,324	3.9	▲1.2	1,745	5.1	▲2.2
Conservative	Daniel Bowman	1,309	3.8	▼5.4	1,623	4.8	▼7.4
AtLS					312	0.9	
Independent Green Voice					268	0.8	
Scottish Family					220	0.6	
Scottish Socialist					215	0.6	
Independent	Craig Houston				160	0.5	
Workers Party					121	0.4	
ISP					114	0.3	
Scottish Christian					93	0.3	
Scottish Common Party	Thomas Adkins	130	0.4	New	51	0.1	
Independent	Elspeth Kerr				32	0.1	
UKIP					17	0.0	
Majority		2,171	6.4				
Valid votes		34,063			34,096		
Invalid votes		156			116		
Turnout		34,219	54.9		34,212	54.9	
SNP win (new seat)							
Notes

2021 notional result (Note: Estimate of the 2019 general election result as if the revised boundaries recommended under the 2025 boundary review were in place)
Party	Vote	%
SNP	16,074	46.6
Labour	9,003	26.1
Scottish Greens	5,139	14.9
Conservative	3,173	9.2
Liberal Democrats	1,103	3.2
Majority	7,071	20.5
Turnout	34,493	53.2
Electorate	64,836	

== See also ==
- List of Scottish Parliament constituencies and electoral regions (2026–)
- Politics of Glasgow
- Glasgow Kelvin (Scottish Parliament constituency)
- Glasgow Maryhill (Scottish Parliament constituency)
