= James Kelly (Scottish politician) =

Scottish politician (born 1963)

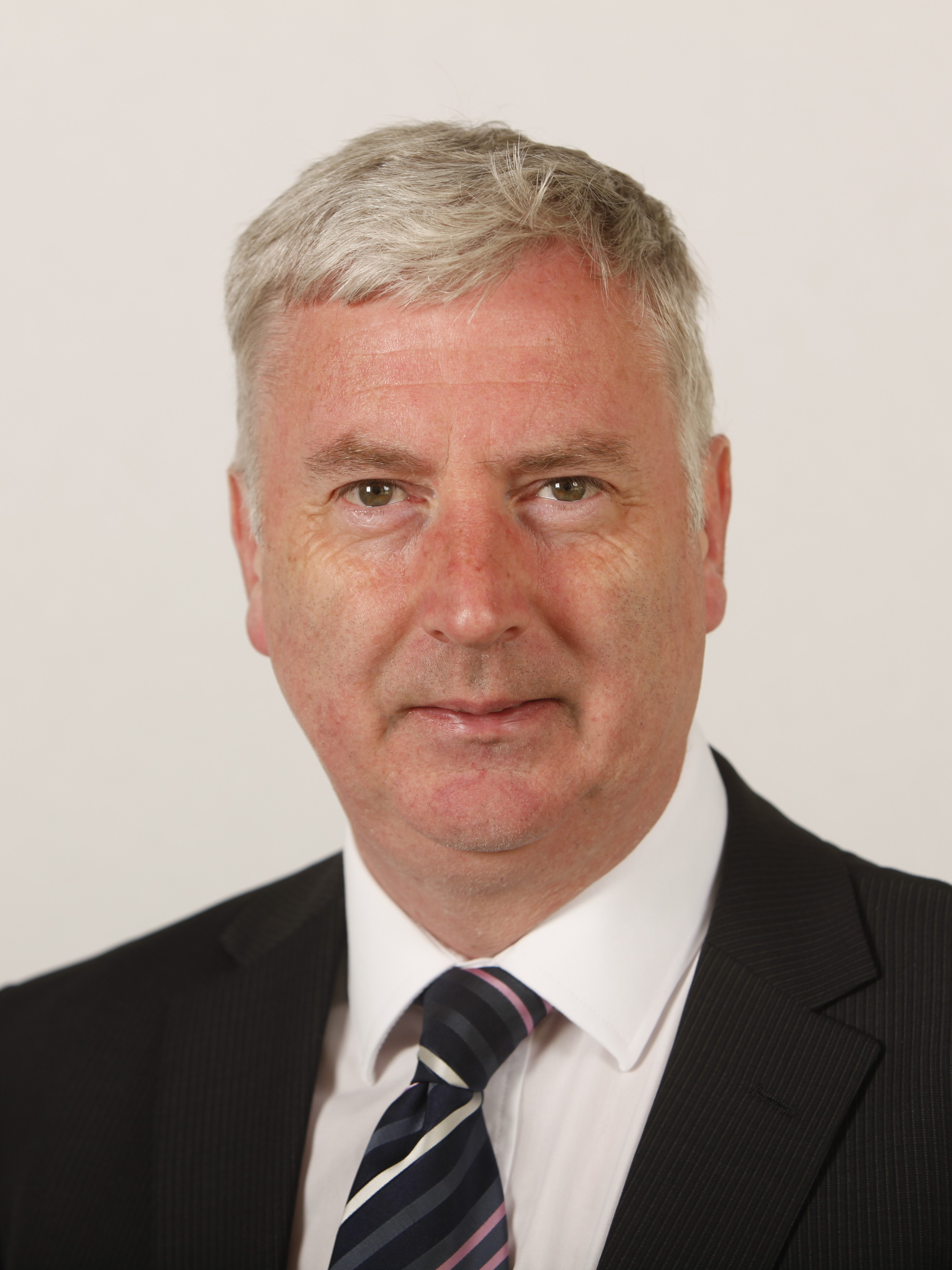
- Official portrait, 2016

General Secretary of the Scottish Labour Party
- In office 5 September 2021 – 3 April 2023
- Leader: Anas Sarwar
- Preceded by: Drew Smith (acting)
- Succeeded by: John Paul McHugh
Parliamentary offices
Member of the Scottish Parliament for Glasgow (1 of 7 Regional MSPs)
In office 5 May 2016 – 5 May 2021
Member of the Scottish Parliament for Rutherglen Glasgow Rutherglen (2007–2011)
In office 3 May 2007 – 24 March 2016
Preceded by	Janis Hughes
Succeeded by	Clare Haughey

Scottish Labour portfolios
- 2012–2013: Chief Whip of the Scottish Labour Party
- 2013–2014: Shadow Cabinet Secretary for Infrastructure, Investment and Cities
- 2014–2017: Shadow Minister for Parliamentary Business
- 2017–2019: Shadow Cabinet Secretary for Finance (Note: Finance and the Constitution (2017–18))
- 2019–2020: Shadow Cabinet Secretary for Justice
- Mar–May 2021: Shadow Minister for Parliamentary Business

Personal details
- Born: James Anthony Kelly; 23 October 1963 (age 63)
- Party: Scottish Labour and Co-operative
- Spouse: Alexa Kelly
- Children: 2
- Occupation: Computer analyst
- Website: https://www.jameskelly.scot/

James Anthony Kelly (born 23 October 1963) is a Scottish politician who served as General Secretary of the Scottish Labour Party between 2021 and 2023. He was a Member of the Scottish Parliament (MSP) for the Glasgow region between 2016 and 2021, having previously been MSP for Rutherglen (formerly Glasgow Rutherglen) from 2007 to 2016.

Kelly has held a number of Scottish Labour frontbench posts including Finance Spokesperson and Justice Spokesperson under Richard Leonard from 2017 to 2020. He served as the Scottish Labour Party's Parliamentary Business Manager at Holyrood as well as Spokesperson for Community Safety and Drugs Policy.

== Early life and career ==
Kelly grew up in the Halfway area of Cambuslang, and was educated at the co-educational, Roman Catholic Trinity High School, Rutherglen. He studied at Glasgow College of Technology and went on to work in computing and finance. A chartered accountant, he worked as a business analyst in East Kilbride. He served as the election agent for the former Rutherglen and Hamilton West MP Tommy McAvoy at the 1997, 2001 and 2005 general elections. He was also chair of the Rutherglen and Hamilton West Constituency Labour Party.

== Political career ==
Kelly was elected as MSP for Rutherglen in 2007 Scottish Parliament election. Upon entering the Scottish Parliament, he served on the Finance Committee and as a Labour Whip. From 2008 to 2011, he was a member of the Justice Committee and Shadow Minister for Community Safety.

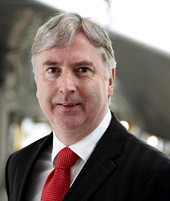
Kelly in 2011

Kelly was re-elected at the 2011 Scottish Parliament election. Following the election of Johann Lamont as Leader of the Scottish Labour Party in the 2011 leadership election, he was appointed Chief Whip in Holyrood. He was subsequently made Shadow Cabinet Secretary for Infrastructure, Investment and Cities in a reshuffle in June 2013.

After the election of Jim Murphy as Leader of the Scottish Labour Party, Kelly was appointed to succeed Paul Martin as Labour's Parliamentary Business Manager.

Under Kezia Dugdale's leadership, he remained parliamentary business manager. In December 2014, he was named as the party's election coordinator for the 2016 Scottish Parliament election.

In December 2015, Kelly was ejected from the parliamentary debating chamber by presiding officer Tricia Marwick when he refused to sit down after attempting to make a point of order during a trade union bill debate.

Kelly sought selection for the Glasgow regional list prior to the 2016 Scottish Parliament election. While Kelly lost his Holyrood constituency seat to the SNP's Clare Haughey in 2016, he was elected as a list MSP for the Glasgow region. Haughey's majority of 3,743 made it a target seat for Labour in the future. The equivalent Westminster seat Rutherglen and Hamilton West was won back by Labour's Gerard Killen in the 2017 UK general election, despite being one of the biggest swings towards the SNP two years prior. He was the party's campaign manager for the 2017 general election.

When Kezia Dugdale resigned as Scottish Labour leader, Kelly's name was touted as a potential successor. In December 2017, Richard Leonard appointed Kelly as his Shadow Cabinet Secretary for Finance and the Constitution. In October 2018, following a reshuffle of the Scottish Labour frontbench in Holyrood, Kelly continued to hold the finance portfolio while Neil Findlay took forward the constitutional brief.

He was reselected in September 2019 as the Scottish Labour and Co-operative candidate for Rutherglen constituency at the 2021 Scottish Parliament election.

He served as the Convener of the Cross-Party Group in the Scottish Parliament on Co-operatives and was the deputy Convener of the Cross-Party Group on Sport.

=== Repeal of the Offensive Behaviour at Football Act ===
Following his re-election to the Scottish Parliament in May 2016, Kelly took forward his pledge to lead a member's bill to repeal the Offensive Behaviour at Football 2012 Act. He described the 2012 legislation as having "completely failed to tackle sectarianism" and as "illiberal" which "unfairly targets football fans", "condemned by legal experts, human rights organisations and equality groups".

On 25 January 2018, MSPs voted by 65 to 61 in favour of the general principles of Kelly's Bill in the first stage of Holyrood's legislative process. It marked the first binding defeat in Parliament for the SNP Minority Government. On 15 March, the vote to repeal the Act was passed with 62 in favour and 60 against.

On 31 March 2019, violent incidents occurred during and after the Old Firm (Celtic vs Rangers) derby. A day later, Scottish Police Federation vice-chairman David Hamilton appeared on the BBC Radio Scotland John Beattie Programme and stated:

Personally I believe the repeal of the Offensive Behaviour at Football Act has had an impact, because I think that some people feel wrongly legitimised to behave in a way that they wouldn’t otherwise behave.

=== Justice Spokesperson ===
In September 2019, Kelly was appointed as Shadow Cabinet Secretary for Justice. He resigned from this role in September 2020 while calling for Richard Leonard's resignation as Scottish Labour leader. In his resignation letter, seen by the Daily Record, James Kelly told Richard Leonard: “I have no confidence in your ability to shape the party's message, strategy and organisation. I know that this is a view shared by other parliamentarians, party members and indeed many members of the public.”

=== Return to frontbench ===
Kelly nominated Anas Sarwar in the 2021 Scottish Labour leadership election. Following Sarwar's election as Leader of the Scottish Labour Party, he was re-appointed as Parliamentary Business Manager as well as spokesperson for Community Safety and Drugs Policy ahead of the 2021 Scottish Parliament election. In the election he lost out to Clare Haughey in the constituency, and though four Labour candidates were elected on the regional vote, Kelly had been fifth on the party list so was not returned as an MSP.

== Personal life ==
Kelly currently lives in Cambuslang with his wife, Alexa, and their two daughters. He has spoken about his interests in sport, namely football, tennis and running.
