= Glasgow Maryhill and Springburn =

Constituency of the Scottish Parliament

- Former burgh constituency for the Scottish Parliament

- Glasgow Maryhill and Springburn shown within the Glasgow electoral region and the region shown within Scotland
- Population: 74,527 (2019)

Former constituency
- Created: 2011
- Abolished: 2026
- Council area: Glasgow City
- Created from: Glasgow Maryhill and Glasgow Springburn
- Replaced by: Glasgow Easterhouse and Springburn and Glasgow Kelvin and Maryhill

Glasgow Maryhill and Springburn (Gaelic: Glaschu Cnoc Màiri agus Allt an Fhuarain) was a constituency of the Scottish Parliament, being one of eight constituencies within the Glasgow City council area. Under the additional-member system used for elections to the Scottish Parliament, the seat elected one Member of the Scottish Parliament (MSP) by the plurality (first past the post) method of election, and was also one of nine constituencies in the Glasgow electoral region, which elected seven additional members, in addition to the nine constituency MSPs, to produce a form of proportional representation for the region as a whole.

The constituency was created in 2011 from a merger of parts of the Glasgow Maryhill, Glasgow Springburn and a small part of the Glasgow Anniesland constituencies. The parts of Glasgow Anniesland were Kelvindale and Kelvinside, that had previously been in Glasgow Hillhead before 1997. It was abolished as a result of the second periodic review of Scottish Parliament boundaries in 2025. From the 2026 Scottish Parliament election, the area previously covered by Glasgow Maryhill and Springburn became part of the new seats of Glasgow Easterhouse and Springburn and Glasgow Kelvin and Maryhill.

The seat had been held by Bob Doris of the Scottish National Party from the 2016 Scottish Parliament election until its abolition.

== Electoral region ==
During the period Glasgow Maryhill and Springburn was in existence, the other eight constituencies of the Glasgow region were: Glasgow Anniesland, Glasgow Cathcart, Glasgow Kelvin, Glasgow Pollok, Glasgow Provan, Glasgow Shettleston, Glasgow Southside and Rutherglen.

In this period the region covered all of the Glasgow City council area, and a north-western portion of the South Lanarkshire council area.

== Constituency boundaries ==
Map of boundaries from 2011

Following their First Periodic review into constituencies to the Scottish Parliament in time for the 2011 election, the Boundary Commission for Scotland recommended the effective merger of the Glasgow Springburn and Glasgow Maryhill constituencies. The electoral wards used in the creation of Glasgow Maryhill and Springburn were:

- In full: Maryhill/Kelvin, Springburn
- In part: Canal (shared with Glasgow Kelvin), Dennistoun

== Member of the Scottish Parliament ==
| Election | Member | Party |
|---|---|---|
| 2011 | Patricia Ferguson | Labour |
| 2016 | Bob Doris | SNP |

== Election results ==
=== 2020s ===
2021 Scottish Parliament election: Glasgow Maryhill and Springburn
| Party | Candidate | Constituency | | | Regional | | |
| Party | Candidate | Votes | % | ±% | Votes | % | ±% |
|---|---|---|---|---|---|---|---|
| SNP | Bob Doris (Note: Incumbent member for this constituency) | 16,428 | 59.0 | ▲3.5 | 13,158 | 47.1 | ▼0.5 |
| Labour | Keiran O'Neill | 8,504 | 30.5 | ▼1.3 | 6,722 | 24.1 | ▼1.4 |
| Conservative | Alix Mathieson | 2,241 | 8.0 | ▼1.8 | 2,984 | 10.7 | ▲1.0 |
| Green | | | | | 2,847 | 10.2 | ▲2.2 |
| Alba | | | | | 529 | 1.9 | New |
| Liberal Democrats | Andrew Chamberlain | 688 | 2.5 | ▼0.4 | 503 | 1.8 | 0.0 |
| Independent Green Voice | | | | | 244 | 0.87 | New |
| All for Unity | | | | | 229 | 0.8 | New |
| Scottish Family | | | | | 206 | 0.74 | New |
| Abolish the Scottish Parliament | | | | | 66 | 0.24 | New |
| Freedom Alliance (UK) | | | | | 63 | 0.23 | New |
| TUSC | | | | | 60 | 0.21 | New |
| Women's Equality | | | | | 60 | 0.21 | ▼0.6 |
| Reform | | | | | 45 | 0.16 | New |
| Scottish Libertarian | | | | | 45 | 0.16 | New |
| Communist | | | | | 44 | 0.16 | New |
| Independent | Craig Ross | | | | 36 | 0.13 | New |
| UKIP | | | | | 32 | 0.11 | ▼1.8 |
| SDP | | | | | 19 | 0.07 | New |
| Reclaim | | | | | 15 | 0.05 | New |
| Renew | | | | | 13 | 0.05 | New |
| Independent | Daniel Donaldson | | | | 13 | 0.05 | New |
| Majority | | 7,924 | 28.5 | ▲4.8 | | | |
| Valid votes | | 27,861 | | | 27,933 | | |
| Invalid votes | | 178 | | | 103 | | |
| Turnout | | 28,039 | 51.9 | ▲7.6 | 28,036 | 51.9 | ▲7.5 |
| SNP hold | | Swing | | | | | |

=== 2010s ===
2016 Scottish Parliament election: Glasgow Maryhill and Springburn
| Party | Candidate | Constituency | | | Regional | | |
| Party | Candidate | Votes | % | ±% | Votes | % | ±% |
|---|---|---|---|---|---|---|---|
| SNP | Bob Doris (Note: Incumbent member on the party list, or for another constituency) | 13,109 | 55.5 | ▲13.7 | 11,296 | 47.6 | ▲8.9 |
| Labour | Patricia Ferguson (Note: Incumbent member for this constituency) | 7,507 | 31.8 | ▼16.3 | 6,055 | 25.5 | ▼12.3 |
| Conservative | John Anderson | 2,305 | 9.8 | ▲3.8 | 2,305 | 9.7 | ▲4.6 |
| Green | | | | | 1,903 | 8.0 | ▲3.0 |
| Liberal Democrats | James Harrison | 691 | 2.9 | ▼1.2 | 438 | 1.8 | ▼0.8 |
| UKIP | | | | | 452 | 1.9 | ▲1.4 |
| Solidarity | | | | | 283 | 1.2 | New |
| BUP | | | | | 265 | 1.1 | New |
| RISE | | | | | 199 | 0.8 | New |
| Women's Equality | | | | | 198 | 0.8 | New |
| Animal Welfare | | | | | 182 | 0.8 | New |
| Scottish Christian | | | | | 150 | 0.6 | 0.0 |
| Independent | Andrew McCullagh | | | | 25 | 0.1 | New |
| Majority | | 5,602 | 23.7 | N/A | | | |
| Valid votes | | 23,612 | | | 23,751 | | |
| Invalid votes | | 137 | | | 51 | | |
| Turnout | | 23,749 | 44.3 | ▲7.8 | 23,802 | 44.4 | ▲7.9 |
| SNP gain from Labour | | Swing | | ▲15.0 | | | |
Notes

2011 Scottish Parliament election: Glasgow Maryhill and Springburn
| Party | Candidate | Constituency | | | Regional | | |
| Party | Candidate | Votes | % | ±% | Votes | % | ±% |
|---|---|---|---|---|---|---|---|
| Labour | Patricia Ferguson (Note: Incumbent member for the Glasgow Maryhill constituency) | 9,884 | 48.1 | N/A | 7,765 | 37.8 | N/A |
| SNP | Bob Doris (Note: Incumbent member on the party list, or for another constituency) | 8,592 | 41.8 | N/A | 7,949 | 38.7 | N/A |
| Conservative | Stephanie Murray | 1,222 | 6.0 | N/A | 1,041 | 5.1 | N/A |
| Green | | | | | 1,035 | 5.0 | N/A |
| Liberal Democrats | Sophie Bridger | 833 | 4.1 | N/A | 537 | 2.6 | N/A |
| Respect | | | | | 537 | 2.6 | N/A |
| All-Scotland Pensioners Party | | | | | 448 | 2.2 | N/A |
| Socialist Labour | | | | | 320 | 1.6 | N/A |
| BNP | | | | | 268 | 1.3 | N/A |
| Scottish Socialist | | | | | 161 | 0.8 | N/A |
| Scottish Christian | | | | | 136 | 0.7 | N/A |
| Scottish Unionist | | | | | 147 | 0.7 | N/A |
| UKIP | | | | | 97 | 0.5 | N/A |
| Pirate | | | | | 49 | 0.2 | N/A |
| Scottish Homeland Party | | | | | 38 | 0.2 | N/A |
| Independent | Caroline Johnstone | | | | 27 | 0.1 | N/A |
| Majority | | 1,292 | 6.3 | N/A | | | |
| Valid votes | | 20,531 | | | 20,555 | | |
| Invalid votes | | 142 | | | 99 | | |
| Turnout | | 20,673 | 36.5 | N/A | 20,654 | 36.5 | N/A |
| Labour win (new seat) | | | | | | | |

== See also ==
- Politics of Glasgow
