= Clare Haughey =

Scottish politician (born 1967)

Clare Haughey MSP
- Official portrait, 2026

Minister for Children and Young People
- In office 20 May 2021 – 29 March 2023
- First Minister: Nicola Sturgeon
- Preceded by: Maree Todd
- Succeeded by: Natalie Don

Minister for Mental Health
- In office 27 June 2018 – 20 May 2021
- First Minister: Nicola Sturgeon
- Preceded by: Maureen Watt
- Succeeded by: Kevin Stewart

Member of the Scottish Parliament for Rutherglen and Cambuslang Rutherglen (2016–2026)
- Incumbent
- Assumed office 5 May 2016
- Preceded by: James Kelly
- Majority: 5,844 (17.2%)

Convener of the Finance and Public Administration Committee
- Incumbent
- Assumed office 10 June 2026

Personal details
- Born: Clare Joan Donnelly; April 1967 (age 59) Glasgow, Scotland
- Party: Scottish National Party
- Website: clarehaughey.scot

Clare Joan Haughey (née Donnelly, born April 1967) is a Scottish politician who served as Minister for Children and Young People from 2021 to 2023, having previously served as Minister for Mental Health from 2018 to 2021. A member of the Scottish National Party (SNP), she has served as a Member of the Scottish Parliament (MSP) for Rutherglen and Cambuslang since the 2026 Scottish Parliament election, having previously represented Rutherglen from 2016 until its abolition in 2026. Haughey is currently the convener of the Finance and Public Administration Committee.

== Nursing career ==
Haughey trained as a mental health nurse and worked as a clinical nurse manager. Her family were based in Australia for some years.

== Political career ==
In September 2015, the SNP branch selected her as the candidate for the Rutherglen constituency, ahead of the 2016 Scottish Parliament election. The constituency had been held by Labour since the establishment of the Scottish Parliament in 1999 until the election in May 2016, when Haughey defeated the incumbent James Kelly.

On 27 June 2018, Haughey was appointed as the Scottish Government's Minister for Mental Health.

She retained the Rutherglen seat in the 2021 Scottish Parliament election, with an increased majority and just over 50% of the vote share.

On 19 May 2021, Haughey was appointed to the new government as Minister for Children and Young People.

On 29 March 2023, Haughey was appointed as the Convenor of the Health, Social Care and Sport Committee.

Political offices
| Preceded by Maree Todd | Minister for Children and Young People; 2021–present | Incumbent |
| Preceded by Maureen Watt | Minister for Mental Health; 2018–2021 | Succeeded by Kevin Stewart as Minister for mental wellbeing and social care |
Scottish Parliament
| Preceded by James Kelly | Member of the Scottish Parliament for Rutherglen; 2016–2026 | Succeeded by Constituency abolished |
| Preceded by Constituency established | Member of the Scottish Parliament for Rutherglen and Cambuslang; 2026–present | Incumbent |
