= Ivan McKee =

Scottish politician (born 1963)

Ivan McKee MSP
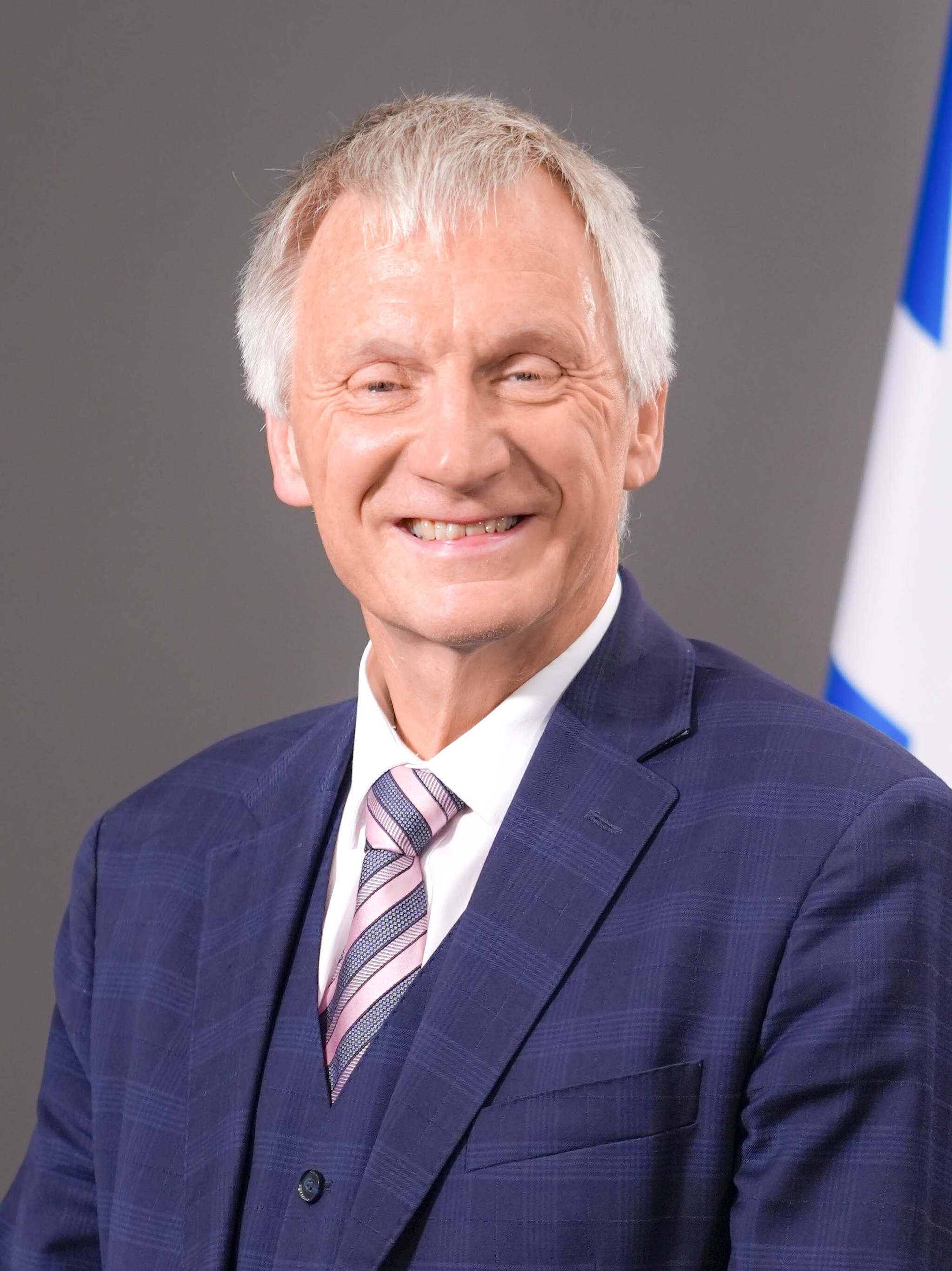
- Official portrait, 2026

Cabinet Secretary for Public Service Reform
- Incumbent
- Assumed office 21 May 2026
- First Minister: John Swinney
- Preceded by: Office established

Minister for Public Finance
- In office 9 May 2024 – 20 May 2026
- First Minister: John Swinney
- Preceded by: Tom Arthur
- Succeeded by: Hannah Mary Goodlad

Minister for Business, Trade, Tourism and Enterprise
- In office 20 May 2021 – 29 March 2023
- First Minister: Nicola Sturgeon
- Preceded by: Jamie Hepburn
- Succeeded by: Richard Lochhead

Member of the Scottish Parliament for Glasgow Easterhouse and Springburn Glasgow Provan (2016–2026)
- Incumbent
- Assumed office 5 May 2016
- Preceded by: Paul Martin
- Majority: 6,617 (20.0%)

Personal details
- Born: September 1963 (age 62) Helensburgh, Dunbartonshire, Scotland
- Party: Scottish National Party
- Education: University of Strathclyde; Newcastle University
- Website: www.ivanmckee.scot

Ivan Paul McKee (born September 1963) is a Scottish politician who has served as Cabinet Secretary for Public Service Reform since 2026. He previously served as Minister for Public Finance from 2024 to 2026 and Minister for Business, Trade, Tourism and Enterprise from 2021 to 2023. A member of the Scottish National Party (SNP), he has been the Member of the Scottish Parliament (MSP) for Glasgow Easterhouse and Springburn, previously Glasgow Provan, since 2016.

== Early life and education ==
Brought up in Glasgow, McKee obtained a BSc.BEng in Manufacturing Sciences and Engineering from the University of Strathclyde and an MBA from Newcastle University.

== Industrial and business career ==
In 1986 he began a two-year period of voluntary service in Bangladesh with VSO. Following this, McKee worked for a variety of manufacturing companies. In 2005 he set up his own international manufacturing consultancy business and from 2009 to 2015 invested in, and successfully turned around, a number of manufacturing businesses including the purchase of distressed assets from Dunfermline-based Simclar whilst in Administration.

McKee has significant international experience having managed businesses in Scotland, England, Poland, Finland, Croatia and Bosnia.

== Political activity ==
McKee joined the Labour Party in 1980, leaving in the late 1990s. He returned to political activism during the Scottish Independence Referendum as a Director of Business for Scotland, making the business and economic case for a Yes vote. After joining the SNP in November 2014, McKee was selected to contest the Glasgow Provan seat for the Party at the 2016 Scottish Parliament election. He was Parliamentary Liaison Officer to the Cabinet Secretary for Economy, Jobs and Fair Work 2016–18. He backed Kate Forbes in the SNP leadership race in February 2023.

In May 2024, First Minister John Swinney appointed McKee as Minister for Public Finance, as part of his inaugural government. He was promoted to Cabinet Secretary for Public Service Reform in 2026.

== Other ==
McKee is a former Trustee of the charity CEI which supports educational and health projects in rural Bangladesh. He was formerly a member of the Board of Common Weal. In 1996 McKee took part in an aid convey to Bosnia with charity Edinburgh Direct Aid.

== Personal life ==
McKee is married and lives in Glasgow with his wife Ewa, whom he met in Poland. He has four children, all from previous relationships.

He is an atheist.
