= Glasgow Provan (Scottish Parliament constituency) =

Region or constituency of the Scottish Parliament

- Former burgh constituency for the Scottish Parliament

- Glasgow Provan shown within the Glasgow electoral region and the region shown within Scotland
- Population: 76,859 (2019)

Former constituency
- Created: 2011
- Abolished: 2026
- Council area: Glasgow City
- Replaced by: Glasgow Baillieston and Shettleston, Glasgow Easterhouse and Springburn

Glasgow Provan (Gaelic: Glaschu Provan) was a constituency of the Scottish Parliament, being one of eight constituencies within the Glasgow City council area. Under the additional-member system used for elections to the Scottish Parliament, the seat elected one Member of the Scottish Parliament (MSP) by the plurality (first past the post) method of election, and was also one of nine constituencies in the Glasgow electoral region, which elected seven additional members, in addition to the nine constituency MSPs, to produce a form of proportional representation for the region as a whole.

The constituency was created ahead of the 2011 Scottish Parliament election, and covered much of the area of the Glasgow Baillieston constituency, which was abolished.

The seat was held by Ivan McKee of the Scottish National Party from the 2016 Scottish Parliament election until its abolition in 2026.

As a result of the second periodic review of Scottish Parliament boundaries in 2025, the constituency was abolished ahead of the 2026 Scottish Parliament election. The area covered by Glasgow Provan has been divided between the two new seats of Glasgow Baillieston and Shettleston and Glasgow Easterhouse and Springburn.

== Electoral region ==
During the period Glasgow Provan was in existence, the other eight constituencies of the Glasgow region were: Glasgow Anniesland, Glasgow Cathcart, Glasgow Kelvin, Glasgow Maryhill and Springburn, Glasgow Pollok, Glasgow Shettleston, Glasgow Southside and Rutherglen.

In this period the region covered all of the Glasgow City council area, and a north-western portion of the South Lanarkshire council area.

== Constituency boundaries ==
Map of boundaries from 2011

When formed for the 2011 election, the following electoral wards were used to define the Glasgow Provan constituency:

- In full: East Centre, North East
- In part: Baillieston (shared with Glasgow Shettleston)

== Member of the Scottish Parliament ==
Election	Member	Party
2011	Paul Martin	Labour
2016	Ivan McKee	SNP

== Election results ==
=== 2020s ===
2021 Scottish Parliament election: Glasgow Provan
Party	Candidate	Constituency			Regional		
Party	Candidate	Votes	%	±%	Votes	%	±%
SNP	Ivan McKee (Note: Incumbent member for this constituency)	15,913	52.9	▼1.7	14,967	49.5	▲0.4
Labour	Martin McElroy	8,683	28.9	▼5.8	7,437	24.6	▼2.4
Conservative	Annie Wells (Note: Incumbent member on the party list, or for another constituency)	2,687	8.9	▲0.3	3,243	10.7	▲2.5
Green	Kim Long	2,366	7.9	New	2,521	8.3	▲1.6
Alba					547	1.8	New
Liberal Democrats	Nicholas Moohan	421	1.4	▼0.8	359	1.2	▲0.2
All for Unity					238	0.8	New
Independent Green Voice					181	0.6	New
Scottish Family					160	0.5	New
Freedom Alliance (UK)					85	0.3	New
TUSC					78	0.3	New
Abolish the Scottish Parliament					74	0.2	New
Women's Equality					72	0.2	▼0.4
UKIP					55	0.2	▼2.2
Reform					54	0.2	New
Scottish Libertarian					46	0.2	New
Communist					43	0.1	New
Reclaim					24	0.1	New
SDP					21	0.1	New
Renew					9	0.0	New
Independent	Daniel Donaldson				4	0.0	New
Independent	Craig Ross				1	0.0	New
Majority		7,230	24.0	▲4.1			
Valid votes		30,070			30,219		
Invalid votes		150			92		
Turnout		30,220	52.6	▲9.5	30,311	52.8	▲9.6
SNP hold		Swing					

=== 2010s ===
2016 Scottish Parliament election: Glasgow Provan
Party	Candidate	Constituency			Regional		
Party	Candidate	Votes	%	±%	Votes	%	±%
SNP	Ivan McKee	13,140	54.6	▲13.1	11,890	49.1	▲10.2
Labour	Paul Martin (Note: Incumbent member for this constituency)	8,357	34.7	▼17.6	6,534	27.0	▼15.4
Conservative	Annie Wells (Note: Elected on the party list)	2,062	8.6	▲4.5	1,975	8.2	▲4.9
Green					1,624	6.7	▲3.3
Liberal Democrats	Thomas Coleman	518	2.2	0.0	253	1.0	▼0.2
UKIP					574	2.4	▲1.7
Solidarity					358	1.5	New
BUP					301	1.2	New
RISE					205	0.8	New
Animal Welfare					188	0.8	New
Women's Equality					148	0.6	New
Scottish Christian					113	0.5	0.0
Independent	Andrew McCullagh				47	0.2	New
Majority		4,783	19.9	N/A			
Valid votes		24,077			24,210		
Invalid votes		171			61		
Turnout		24,248	43.1	▲8.1	24,271	43.2	▲8.2
SNP gain from Labour		Swing	▲15.4				
Notes

Scottish Parliament Election 2011: Glasgow Provan
Party	Candidate	Constituency			Regional		
Party	Candidate	Votes	%	±%	Votes	%	±%
Labour	Paul Martin (Note: Incumbent member for the Glasgow Springburn constituency)	10,037	52.3	N/A	8,130	42.4	N/A
SNP	Anne McLaughlin (Note: Incumbent member on the party list, or for another constituency)	7,958	41.5	N/A	7,456	38.9	N/A
Green					658	3.4	N/A
Conservative	Majid Hussain	777	4.1	N/A	626	3.3	N/A
Respect					466	2.4	N/A
All-Scotland Pensioners Party					384	2.0	N/A
BNP					318	1.7	N/A
Socialist Labour					316	1.6	N/A
Liberal Democrats	Michael O'Donnell	413	2.2	N/A	230	1.2	N/A
Scottish Unionist					201	1.0	N/A
UKIP					134	0.7	N/A
Scottish Christian					103	0.5	N/A
Scottish Socialist					100	0.5	N/A
Scottish Homeland Party					61	0.3	N/A
Pirate					1	0.0	N/A
Independent	Caroline Johnstone				1	0.0	N/A
Majority		2,079	10.8	N/A			
Valid votes		19,185			19,185		
Invalid votes		134			120		
Turnout		19,319	35.0	N/A	19,305	35.0	N/A
Labour win (new boundaries)							

== See also ==
- Politics of Glasgow
