= Bob Doris =

Scottish National Party politician

Bob Doris MSP
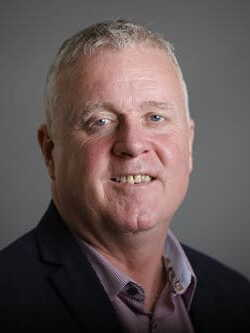
- Official portrait, 2026

Member of the Scottish Parliament for Glasgow Kelvin and Maryhill Glasgow Maryhill and Springburn (2016–2026)
- Incumbent
- Assumed office 5 May 2016
- Preceded by: Patricia Ferguson
- Majority: 2,171 (6.4%)

Convener of the Public Service Reform Committee
- Incumbent
- Assumed office 10 June 2026

Member of the Scottish Parliament for Glasgow (1 of 7 Regional MSPs)
- In office 3 May 2007 – 24 March 2016

Personal details
- Born: Robert Joseph Doris; 11 May 1973 (age 53) Vale of Leven, Dunbartonshire, Scotland
- Party: Scottish National Party
- Spouse: Janet Doris
- Children: 2

Robert Joseph "Bob" Doris (born 11 May 1973) is a Scottish National Party (SNP) politician. He has served as the Member of the Scottish Parliament (MSP) for Glasgow Maryhill and Springburn since the 2016 Scottish Parliament election, having previously served as an MSP for Glasgow from 2007 to 2016.

== Early life ==
Doris was born in the Vale of Leven, Dunbartonshire, and educated at the University of Glasgow earning an MA in Social Sciences from Glasgow University and a PGCE in History and Modern Studies from St Andrew's Teaching College. Before being elected, Doris was a Modern Studies teacher for 10 years.

Prior to the election Doris had acted as campaign manager to Bill Wilson when Wilson challenged John Swinney for the SNP leadership in 2003. Doris convened the SNP Maryhill Constituency Branch and Glasgow Regional Association SNP (GRA) for a number of years.

== Career ==
At the 2007 election Doris contested the Glasgow Maryhill Scottish Parliament constituency, finishing second to Patricia Ferguson, who held a majority 2,300. He was subsequently elected as an MSP for the Glasgow region.

Since his election, Doris campaigned successfully on a number of issues including free school meals, kinship care payments and Town Centre Regeneration Fund money for Glasgow. He was a leading campaigner against Glasgow City Council's closure of 20 primary and nursery schools, and supported the parental occupation of Wyndford Primary School and St Gregory's Primary School, both in Maryhill. Doris convenes the Scottish Parliament's cross party group on Racial Equality in Scotland and the cross-party group on Rare, Genetic And Undiagnosed Conditions.

In 2011, Doris was the SNP candidate for the redrawn seat of Glasgow Maryhill and Springburn. He was also placed 3rd on the SNP regional list for Glasgow behind Nicola Sturgeon and Humza Yousaf. He was unsuccessful in gaining Glasgow Maryhill and Springburn, losing to Labour's Patricia Ferguson, but was returned as one of two Glasgow list SNP MSPs alongside Yousaf.

=== 2016 – 2026 ===
In the 2016 election, he defeated Ferguson and was elected as the constituency member for Glasgow Maryhill and Springburn. He was convener of the Local Government and Communities Committee from 5 May 2016 to 6 September 2021 and of the Social Security Committee from 13 September 2018 to 4 May 2021.

In 2021, Doris was returned as the MSP for Glasgow Maryhill and Springburn with a majority of 7,924 (representing a 59% share of the vote).

He was the deputy convenor of the Social Justice and Social Security Committee, and a member of the Net Zero, Energy and Transport Committee during the 6th Scottish Parliament.

Doris has been campaigning on the misuse of off-road vehicles, such as quad bikes. In 2024 he led a debate in the Scottish Parliament, and has called for the crackdown in the dangerous use of such vehicles. His work in this area also includes a working group, which saw an awareness campaign during the summer of 2025.

In the same year, he is also campaigning for the decarbonisation of the Maryhill Line.

=== 2026 Scottish Parliament election ===
Following boundary changes, Doris was elected as the MSP for the new Glasgow Kelvin and Maryhill constituency in the 2026 Scottish Parliament election.

In June 2026, members of the Scottish Parliament voted for Doris to be the convener of the Public Service Reform committee.

== Personal life ==
Doris is married with two young children. He has stated he is a fan of Bruce Springsteen.

== See also ==
- First Salmond government

Scottish Parliament
Preceded by Patricia Ferguson	Member of the Scottish Parliament for Glasgow Maryhill and Springburn; 2016–present	Incumbent
