= Paul Martin (Scottish politician) =

Scottish Labour politician (born 1967)

The Honourable Paul Martin
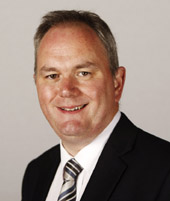
- Official portrait, 2011

Parliamentary Business Manager of the Scottish Labour Party
- In office 28 October 2009 – 16 December 2014
- Leader: Iain Gray; Johann Lamont
- Preceded by: Cathy Jamieson
- Succeeded by: James Kelly

Member of the Scottish Parliament for Glasgow Provan Glasgow Springburn (1999–2011)
- In office 6 May 1999 – 24 March 2016
- Preceded by: Constituency established
- Succeeded by: Ivan McKee

Personal details
- Born: 17 March 1967 (age 59) Glasgow, Scotland
- Party: Labour
- Spouse: Marie McGarvie
- Children: 2 daughters, Abigail Martin, Rachael Martin
- Parent: Michael Martin
- Education: Barmulloch College

Paul Martin (born 17 March 1967) is a Scottish politician who served as Member of the Scottish Parliament (MSP) for the Glasgow Provan constituency from 2011 to 2016. A member of the Scottish Labour Party, he previously represented Glasgow Springburn from 1999 to 2011.

== Early life and education ==
Paul Martin was born in 1967 in Glasgow, the son of Michael Martin (1945–2018), a sheet metal worker, and Mary Martin (née McLay), an assembly worker. His parents had married the previous year. Michael was a member of the Labour Party and would go on to become a Member of Parliament (MP), Speaker of the House of Commons and life peer. Paul was educated at All Saints Roman Catholic Secondary School and Barmulloch College in Glasgow.

== Political career ==
At the age of 26, Martin became a Glasgow District Councillor for the Royston ward following a council by-election in December 1993. He was first elected to the Scottish Parliament in May 1999 as MSP for Glasgow Springburn. He served as parliamentary aide to the Lord Advocate from 2001 to 2007 and to the Shadow Cabinet Secretary for Justice from 2007 to 2009. Following the 2007 Scottish Parliament election, he was appointed as Scottish Labour's spokesperson for community safety, and as parliamentary business manager on 28 October 2009.

In 2016, Martin sought re-election to a fifth term in the Scottish Parliament but lost his seat to the Scottish National Party's Ivan McKee by 4,783 votes. After losing his seat, he took up the role of CEO and collector at the Merchants House of Glasgow and in October 2022 became CEO of Millbank Housing Association

== Personal life ==
Martin is married to Marie (née McGarvie) and has two daughters, one named Abbie.

Scottish Parliament
New constituency	Member of the Scottish Parliament for Glasgow Springburn; 1999–2011	Constituency abolished
New constituency	Member of the Scottish Parliament for Glasgow Provan; 2011–2016	Succeeded by Ivan McKee
