= Glasgow Springburn (Scottish Parliament constituency) =

Region or constituency of the Scottish Parliament

- Former burgh constituency for the Scottish Parliament

- Glasgow Springburn shown within the Glasgow electoral region and the region shown within Scotland

Former constituency
- Created: 1999
- Abolished: 2011
- Council area: Glasgow City
- Replaced by: Glasgow Maryhill and Springburn

Glasgow Springburn was a constituency of the Scottish Parliament (Holyrood). It elected one Member of the Scottish Parliament (MSP) by the plurality (first past the post) method of election. From the 2011 election, the constituency was abolished and subsumed into a larger Glasgow Maryhill and Springburn seat.

== Electoral region ==
The region covered the Glasgow City council area and a north-western portion of the South Lanarkshire council area.

== Constituency boundaries ==
Map of boundaries from 2005-2011

The Glasgow Springburn constituency was created at the same time as the Scottish Parliament, in 1999, with the name and boundaries of an existing Westminster constituency. In 2005, however, Scottish Westminster (House of Commons) constituencies were mostly replaced with new constituencies.

The Holyrood constituency was entirely within the Glasgow City council area, on its northern boundary. It was west of the Baillieston constituency, north of Shettleston, northeast of Kelvin and east of Maryhill, which were also entirely within the city area.

=== Boundary review ===
Following their First Periodic review into constituencies to the Scottish Parliament in time for the 2011 election, the Boundary Commission for Scotland recommended the effective merger of the Glasgow Springburn and Glasgow Maryhill constituencies. The new creation is a constituency known as Glasgow Maryhill and Springburn.

== Member of the Scottish Parliament ==
Election	Member	Party
1999	Paul Martin	Labour
2011	Constituency abolished; see Glasgow Maryhill and Springburn	

== Election results ==
2007 Scottish Parliament election: Glasgow Springburn
Party	Candidate	Votes	%	±%
Labour	Paul Martin	10,024	56.9	−2.1
SNP	Anne McLaughlin	4,929	28.0	+12.1
Liberal Democrats	Katy McCloskey	1,108	6.3	+2.2
Conservative	Gordon Wilson	1,067	6.1	−0.5
Scottish Christian	David Johnston	484	2.8	New
Majority		5,095	28.9	−14.2
Turnout		17,612	37.5	0.0
Labour hold		Swing	-7.1	

2003 Scottish Parliament election: Glasgow Springburn
Party	Candidate	Votes	%	±%
Labour	Paul Martin	10,963	59.0	+0.4
SNP	Frank Rankin	2,956	15.9	−10.3
Scottish Socialist	Margaret Bean	2,653	14.3	+9.6
Conservative	Alan Rodger	1,233	6.6	+1.3
Liberal Democrats	Charles Dundas	768	4.1	−1.2
Majority		8,007	43.1	+10.7
Turnout		18,573	37.5	−6.0
Labour hold		Swing		

1999 Scottish Parliament election: Glasgow Springburn
Party	Candidate	Votes	%	±%
Labour	Paul Martin	14,268	58.6	N/A
SNP	John Brady	6,375	26.2	N/A
Conservative	Murray Roxburgh	1,293	5.3	N/A
Liberal Democrats	Matthew Dunnigan	1,288	5.3	N/A
Scottish Socialist	James Friel	1,141	4.7	N/A
Majority		7,893	32.4	N/A
Turnout		26,080	43.5	N/A
Labour win (new seat)				

== See also ==
- Politics of Glasgow
