= Blairdardie =

Area of Glasgow, Scotland

Coordinates: 55.902306°N 4.357607°W

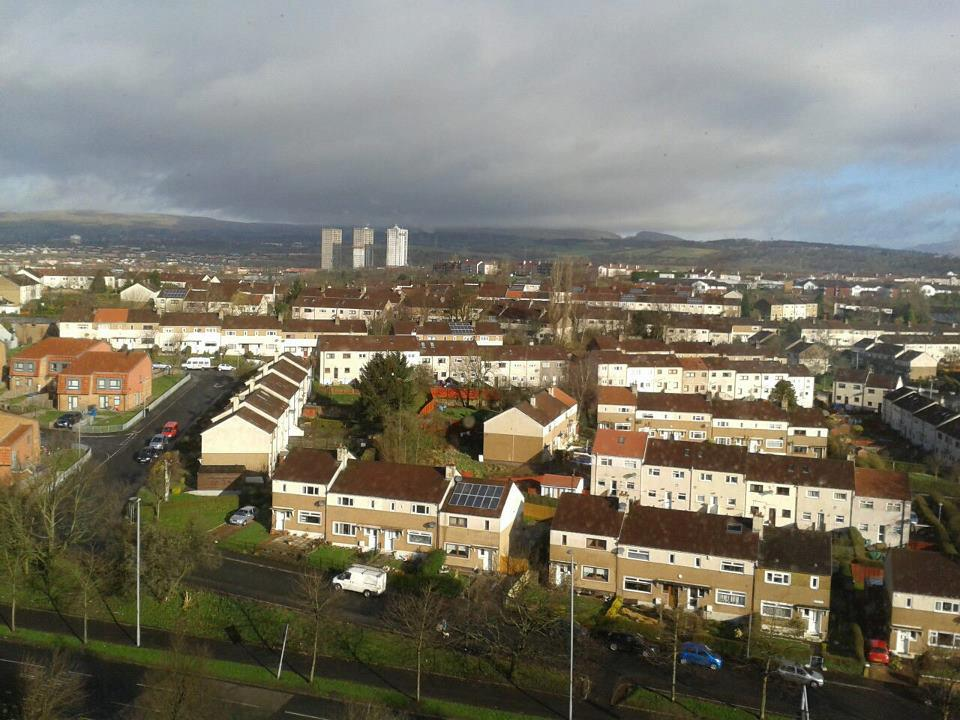
- Looking north over North Blairdardie from high flats

- Location within Glasgow
- OS grid reference: NS527702
- Council area: Glasgow City Council
- Lieutenancy area: Glasgow
- Country: Scotland
- Sovereign state: United Kingdom
- Post town: GLASGOW
- Postcode district: G15 6
- Dialling code: 0141
- Police: Scotland
- Fire: Scottish
- Ambulance: Scottish
- UK Parliament: Glasgow North West
- Scottish Parliament: Glasgow Anniesland

Blairdardie is a neighbourhood in the Scottish city of Glasgow. It is situated north of the River Clyde in the north-west of the city and is surrounded by other residential areas: High Knightswood, Knightswood, Old Drumchapel, Drumchapel and Garscadden. It was built between the 1950s and early 1960s.

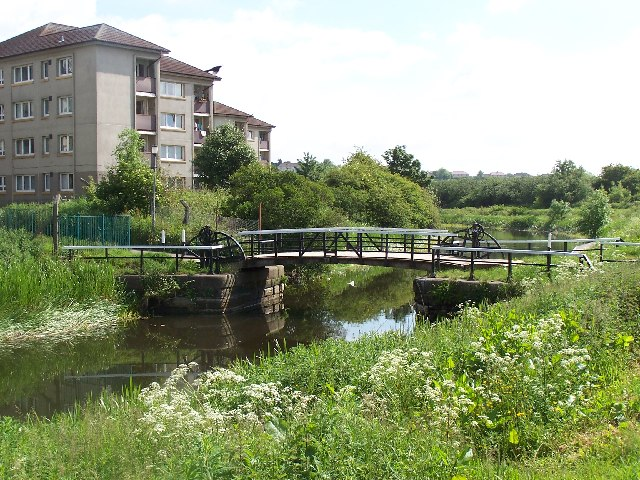
Blairdardie bascule bridge over the Forth and Clyde canal

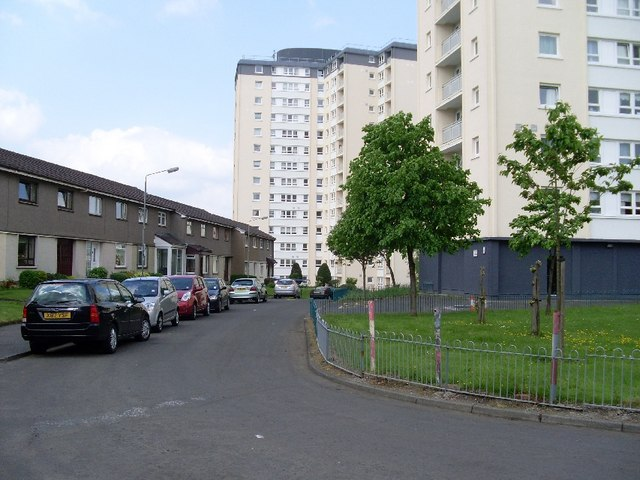
Keal Crescent, Blairdardie - geograph.org.uk - 827560

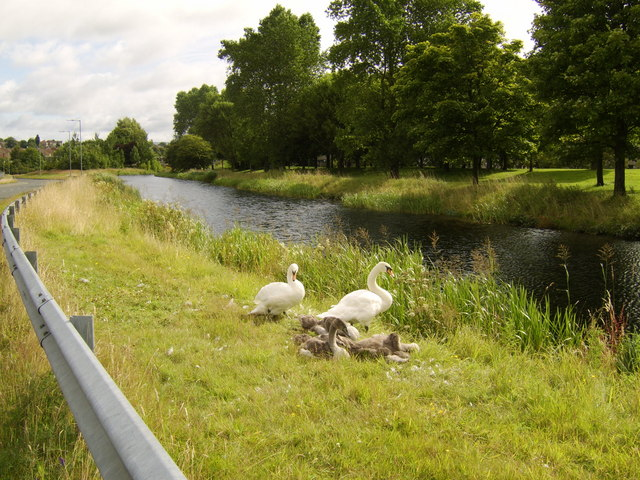
Swans and cygnets on canal bank - geograph.org.uk - 515071

== Description ==
The main thoroughfare, Great Western Road (A82) runs right through the middle creating a 'South Blairdardie' (Keal Avenue, Keal Crescent, Keal Drive) which extends to the Forth and Clyde Canal and a 'North Blairdardie' which extends to Drumchapel Road in the north.

North Blairdardie consists of mostly terraced houses, which were council built and are now a mixture of owner-occupied and rented. Blairdardie Pavilion hosts football pitches, a skateboarding club and various youth and children's clubs. There are two primary schools, Blairdardie Primary (rebuilt in 2019, linked to Knightswood Secondary School) and St Ninian's Primary, linked to St Thomas Aquinas Secondary School. The area is served by Drumchapel railway station, and there is a retail park and a small industrial estate to the west.

South Blairdardie, geographically small but containing housing of higher density than the north part, is made up of mostly council-built low-rise flats of up to five storeys. There are, four landmark multi-storey flats situated along Great Western Road; these towers underwent extensive renovation in 2007. There are further areas of open ground for recreation near to this area at Petersen Park and Knightswood Park.

== See also ==
- Glasgow tower blocks
