= 2007 Glasgow City Council election =

2007 Scottish local government election

← 2003	3 May 2007	2012 →

All 79 seats to Glasgow City Council 40 seats needed for a majority
	First party	Second party	Third party
Party	Labour	SNP	Liberal Democrats
Last election	71 seats, 47.7%	3 seats, 20.5%	3 seats, 7.6%
Seats won	45	22	5
Seat change	▼26	▲19	▲2
Popular vote	81,393	46,185	14,864
Percentage	43.3%	24.6%	7.9%
Swing	▼4.4%	▲4.1%	▲0.3%
	Fourth party	Fifth party	Sixth party
Party	Scottish Green	Conservative	Solidarity
Last election	New party	1 seat, 7.5%	New party
Seats won	5	1	1
Seat change	▲5	0	▲1
Popular vote	12,183	14,412	8,837
Percentage	6.5%	7.7%	4.7
Swing	New	▲0.2%	New
- The 21 multi-member wards

Council Leader before election
Steven Purcell
Labour
Elected Council Leader
Steven Purcell
Labour

Elections to Glasgow City Council were held on 3 May 2007, the same day as the other Scottish local government elections and the Scottish Parliament general election. The election was the first one using 21 new wards created as a result of the Local Governance (Scotland) Act 2004, each ward elected three or four councillors using the single transferable vote system form of proportional representation. The new wards replaced 79 single-member wards which used the plurality (first past the post) system of election. It also saw the election of Glasgow's first councillors for the Scottish Greens and for Solidarity.

== Election result ==

2007 Glasgow City Council election result
Party	Seats	Gains	Losses	Net gain/loss	Seats %	Votes %	Votes	+/−
Labour	45	0	26	–26	56.95	43.31	81,393	
SNP	22	19	0	+19	27.85	24.58	46,185	
Liberal Democrats	5	2	0	+2	6.33	7.91	14,864	
Scottish Green	5	5	0	+5	6.33	6.48	12,183	
Conservative	1	0	0	±0	1.27	7.67	14,412	
Solidarity	1	1	0	+1	1.27	4.71	8,837	
Scottish Socialist	0	0	1	-1	0.00	2.46	4,631	
Scottish Unionist	0	0	0	0	0.00	1.07	2,020	
BNP	0	0	0	0	0.00	0.45	840	
CPA	0	0	0	0	0.00	0.14	270	
Scottish Christian	0	0	0	0	0.00	0.07	137	
Nine Per Cent Growth	0	0	0	0	0.00	0.03	51	
Independent	0	0	0	0	0.00	1.11	2,093	

- Total votes cast: 187,916

== Ward results ==
=== Ward 1: Linn (4 seats) ===
2007 Council election: Linn (4 members)
Party	Candidate	FPv%	Count							
Party	Candidate	FPv%	1	2	3	4	5	6	7	8
SNP	David Ritchie	21.35	2,043							
Labour	Sadie Docherty	18.63	1,782	1,789	1,798	1,807	1,826	1,849	1,896	1,947
Liberal Democrats	Margot Clark	13.42	1,284	1,302	1,311	1,318	1,350	1,458	1,532	1,866
Labour	John McKenzie (Note: Outgoing councillor for Castlemilk single-member ward.)	14.44	1,381	1,389	1,395	1,417	1,433	1,459	1,514	1,530
Labour	Allan Stewart	9.98	955	961	970	980	990	1,001	1,078	1,105
Conservative	Esme H Clark	9.39	898	905	906	961	991	1,005	1,015	
Solidarity	Frank Young	4.13	395	409	469	478	498			
Scottish Green	Chloe Helen Stewart	3.09	296	310	328	338	359			
Independent	Chris Lang	2.29	219	224	229	239				
Scottish Unionist	Harry McArthur	1.72	165	166	170					
Scottish Socialist	Gordon Thomson	1.56	149	156						
Electorate: 21,624 Valid: 9,567 Spoilt: 217 Quota: 1,914 Turnout: 45.25%

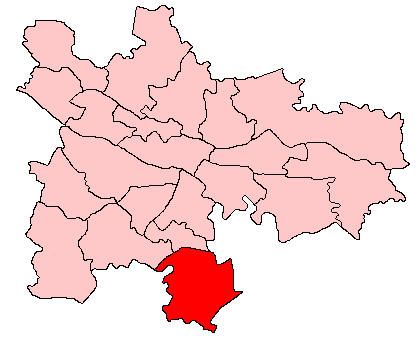
Linn within Glasgow

=== Ward 2: Newlands/Auldburn (3 seats) ===
2007 Council election: Newlands/Auldburn (3 members)
Party	Candidate	FPv%	Count						
Party	Candidate	FPv%	1	2	3	4	5	6	7
SNP	Colin Deans††	24.28	2,101	2,133	2,178				
Labour	Stephen Curran (Note: Outgoing councillor for Pollokshaws single-member ward.)	21.45	1,856	1,873	1,894	1,895	1,939	1,980	2,156
Labour	Jim McNally (Note: Outgoing councillor for Newlands single-member ward.)	17.04	1,475	1,487	1,493	1,494	1,557	1,660	1,800
Conservative	Robert McElroy	15.51	1,342	1,345	1,390	1,391	1,407	1,522	1,625
Scottish Green	Kay Allan	6.69	579	602	619	621	716	894	
Liberal Democrats	Robert W Stewart	6.48	561	570	577	578	617		
Solidarity	Gordon Morgan	4.13	357	388	403	404			
BNP	Charlie Baillie	2.44	211	217					
Scottish Socialist	Eamonn Coyle	1.99	172						
Electorate: 17,582 Valid: 8,654 Spoilt: 170 Quota: 2,164 Turnout: 50.19%

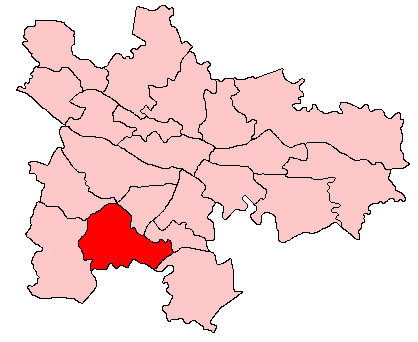
Newlands/Auldburn within Glasgow

=== Ward 3: Greater Pollok (4 seats) ===
2007 Council election: Greater Pollok (4 members)
Party	Candidate	FPv%	Count						
Party	Candidate	FPv%	1	2	3	4	5	6	7
SNP	Patricia Duffy	25.03	2,173						
Labour	Alex Glass (Note: Outgoing councillor for Nitshill single-member ward.)	18.86	1,637	1,680	1,701	1,801			
Labour	Tommy Morrison†††††††††	13.59	1,180	1,201	1,219	1,258	1,290	1,389	1,527
Labour	William O'Rourke (Note: Outgoing councillor for Crookston single-member ward.)††††	14.93	1,296	1,313	1,327	1,355	1,368	1,410	1,494
Solidarity	Alice Sheridan	7.26	630	693	725	771	773	812	1,022
Scottish Socialist	Keith Baldassara (Note: Outgoing councillor for Pollok single-member ward.)	6.81	591	637	661	693	695	739	
Conservative	Rory O'Brien	6.32	549	572	592	674	675		
Liberal Democrats	Fleming Carswell	4.53	393	431	502				
Scottish Green	Caroline Scott	2.68	233	275					
Electorate: 22,106 Valid: 8,682 Spoilt: 244 Quota: 1,737 Turnout: 40.38%

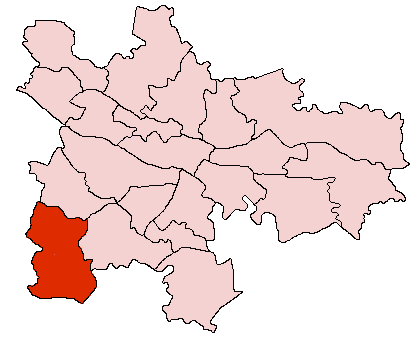
Greater Pollok within Glasgow

=== Ward 4: Craigton (4 seats) ===
2007 Council election: Craigton (4 members)
Party	Candidate	FPv%	Count							
Party	Candidate	FPv%	1	2	3	4	5	6	7	8
SNP	Iris Gibson	24.69	2,729							
Labour	Alistair Watson (Note: Outgoing councillor for North Cardonald single-member ward.)	18.68	2,065	2,096	2,103	2,132	2,161	2,226		
Labour	John Matthew Kerr	17.37	1,920	1,972	1,992	2,007	2,035	2,123	2,127	2,177
Solidarity	Ruth Black†	11.04	1,220	1,315	1,324	1,382	1,462	1,557	1,559	1,641
Labour	Gordon McDiamid	12.02	1,328	1,350	1,357	1,371	1,387	1,430	1,435	1,493
Conservative	Scott Alexander Petty	5.15	569	594	698	702	727	797	798	
Liberal Democrats	Scott R Goghill	4.13	457	500	508	525	631			
Scottish Green	Gordon Masterton	2.85	315	366	390	414				
Scottish Socialist	Wullie McGartland	2.03	224	247	256					
Scottish Unionist	Mark Dingwall	2.04	225	234						
Electorate: 22,772 Valid: 11,052 Spoilt: 243 Quota: 2,211 Turnout: 49.62%

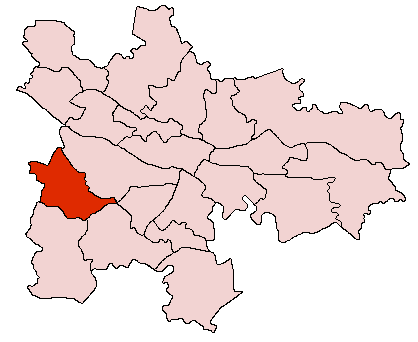
Craigton within Glasgow

=== Ward 5: Govan (4 seats) ===
2007 Council election: Govan (4 members)
Party	Candidate	FPv%	Count							
Party	Candidate	FPv%	1	2	3	4	5	6	7	8
SNP	Allison Hunter	28.18	2,694							
Labour	John Flanagan (Note: Outgoing councillor for Govan single-member ward.)	17.33	1,657	1,705	1,711	1,718	1,747	1,781	1,845	1,881
Labour	Stephen Dornan (Note: Outgoing councillor for Drumoyne single-member ward.)††††††	16.63	1,590	1,651	1,657	1,666	1,696	1,743	1,812	1,852
Labour	Shaukat Butt (Note: Outgoing councillor for Kingston single-member ward.)††††††††††	14.34	1,371	1,412	1,415	1,417	1,449	1,503	1,550	1,594
Scottish Green	Will Jess	3.94	377	473	506	517	555	711	842	977
Conservative	Patricia McIntyre	4.71	450	480	481	531	607	675	690	
Solidarity	Irene Lang	4.16	398	505	548	557	580	600		
Liberal Democrats	Michael Cobley	4.12	394	449	455	468	485			
Independent	George McNee	3.94	377	399	401	408				
Scottish Unionist	Alan Hughes	1.44	138	146	147					
Scottish Socialist	Carolina Perez	1.19	114	138						
Electorate: 23,113 Valid: 9,560 Spoilt: 255 Quota: 1,913 Turnout: 42.47%

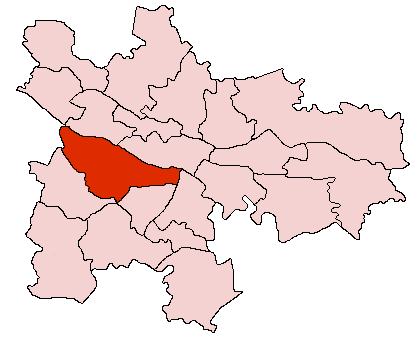
Govan within Glasgow

=== Ward 6: Pollokshields (3 seats) ===
2007 Council election: Pollokshields (3 members)
Party	Candidate	FPv%	Count							
Party	Candidate	FPv%	1	2	3	4	5	6	7	8
Labour	Irfan Rabbani†††††	26.92	2,575							
SNP	Khalil-ur Rahman Malik	21.50	2,057	2,082	2,123	2,256	2,309	2,624		
Conservative	David Meikle	15.00	1,435	1,445	1,452	1,460	1,593	1,610	1,632	1,839
Scottish Green	Ian Ruffell	10.90	1,043	1,060	1,096	1,206	1,280	1,321	1,374	1,835
Liberal Democrats	Isobel Nelson	9.02	863	883	893	918	1,001	1,030	1,070	
Independent	Muhammad Shoaib	6.19	592	605	611	633	656			
Independent	Karin Currie	4.58	438	441	453	472				
Solidarity	Fatima Uygun	3.97	380	388	418					
Scottish Socialist	Ali Ashraf	1.92	184	188						
Electorate: 17,029 Valid: 9,567 Spoilt: 149 Quota: 2,392 Turnout: 57.07%

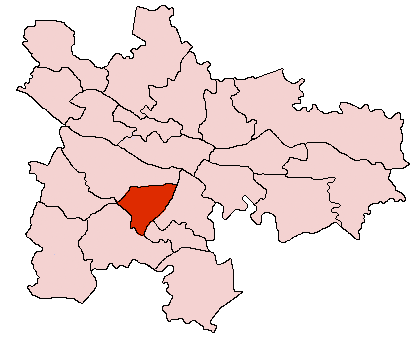
Pollokshields within Glasgow

=== Ward 7: Langside (3 seats) ===
2007 Council election: Langside
Party	Candidate	FPv%	Count						
Party	Candidate	FPv%	1	2	3	4	5	6	7
SNP	James Dornan	27.02	2,522						
Labour	Archie Graham (Note: Outgoing councillor for Langside single-member ward.)	23.81	2,222	2,241	2,255	2,330	2,917		
Liberal Democrats	Paul Coleshill	12.93	1,207	1,243	1,264	1,338	1,405	1,547	1,961
Scottish Green	Neil Sloan McDonald	9.55	891	924	974	1,154	1,214	1,310	1,463
Conservative	Russell Munn	10.64	993	1,003	1,008	1,024	1,052	1,088	
Labour	Margaret McCafferty (Note: Outgoing councillor for Battlefield single-member ward.)	9.14	853	859	868	902			
Solidarity	Martin Frain	5.00	467	492	541				
Scottish Socialist	James Nesbitt	1.92	179	187					
Electorate: 18,296 Valid: 9,334 Spoilt: 149 Quota: 2,334 Turnout: 51.84%

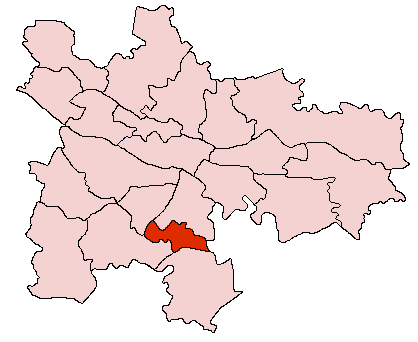
Langside within Glasgow

=== Ward 8: Southside Central (4 seats) ===
2007 Council election: Southside Central
Party	Candidate	FPv%	Count						
Party	Candidate	FPv%	1	2	3	4	5	6	7
SNP	Jahangir Hanif	27.37	2,392						
Labour	Anne Marie Millar (Note: Outgoing councillor for Govanhill single-member ward.)†††††††	21.39	1,869						
Labour	James Scanlon (Note: Outgoing councillor for Toryglen single-member ward.)	15.70	1,372	1,392	1,429	1,448	1,473	1,537	1,915
Scottish Green	Danny Alderslowe	9.29	812	895	900	967	1,072	1,284	1,326
Liberal Democrats	Katy McCloskey	6.10	533	590	596	705	761	831	865
Labour	Hanif Raja	6.34	554	613	651	668	690	748	
Solidarity	Jill McGowan	5.22	456	522	526	537	644		
Scottish Socialist	Rosie Kane	3.74	327	453	456	473			
Conservative	John B Marshall	4.84	423	441	443				
Electorate: 22,863 Valid: 8,738 Spoilt: 235 Quota: 1,748 Turnout: 39.25%

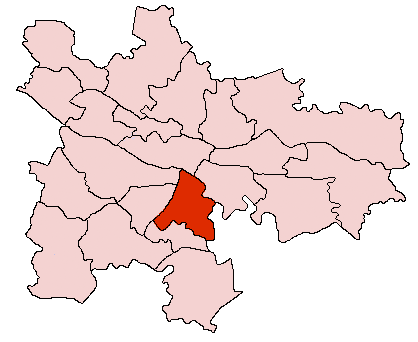
Southside Central within Glasgow

=== Ward 9: Calton (3 seats) ===
2007 Council election: Calton
Party	Candidate	FPv%	Count						
Party	Candidate	FPv%	1	2	3	4	5	6	7
Labour	George Redmond (Note: Outgoing councillor for Bridgeton/Dalmarnock single-member ward.)	38.12	1,982						
SNP	Alison Thewliss	21.98	1,143	1,175	1,196	1,221	1,231	1,282	1,360
Labour	Ruth Simpson (Note: Outgoing councillor for Hyndland single-member ward.)	12.08	628	1,035	1,050	1,072	1,086	1,115	1,189
Solidarity	Fiacra Fullerton	5.81	302	325	349	373	382	420	446
Conservative	Scott Gillespie	4.71	245	250	257	260	348	371	409
Liberal Democrats	Paul Graham	4.44	231	245	252	257	265	329	
Scottish Green	Alasdair Duke-Wardrop	4.21	219	224	235	251	264		
Scottish Unionist	Danny Houston	3.75	195	217	220	225			
Scottish Socialist	Kenny Murray	2.42	126	134	140				
Independent	Gary Barton	2.46	128	130					
Electorate: 15,123 Valid: 5,199 Spoilt: 217 Quota: 1,300 Turnout: 35.83%

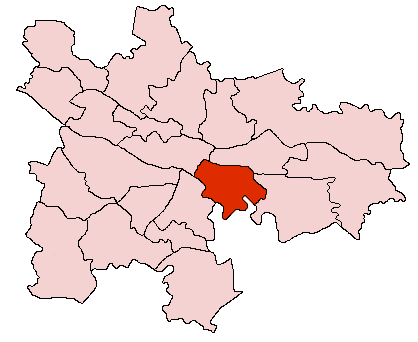
Calton within Glasgow

=== Ward 10: Anderston/City (4 seats) ===
2007 Council election: Anderston/City
Party	Candidate	FPv%	Count					
Party	Candidate	FPv%	1	2	3	4	5	6
SNP	Craig MacKay	23.65	1,632					
Labour	Philip Braat	18.71	1,291	1,306	1,318	1,328	1,366	1,421
Labour	Gordon Matheson (Note: Outgoing councillor for Merchant City single-member ward.)	17.06	1,177	1,194	1,200	1,220	1,259	1,291
Scottish Green	Nina Baker	12.75	880	927	974	1,033	1,163	1,247
Liberal Democrats	Ann Laird	11.68	806	836	866	890	929	1,050
Conservative	Erin Boyle	7.04	486	495	511	515	524	
Solidarity	Akhtar Khan	4.13	285	317	319	367		
Scottish Socialist	Peter Murray	2.87	198	215	228			
Independent	Dave Holladay	2.10	145	150				
Electorate: 20,431 Valid: 6,900 Spoilt: 130 Quota: 1,381 Turnout: 34.41%

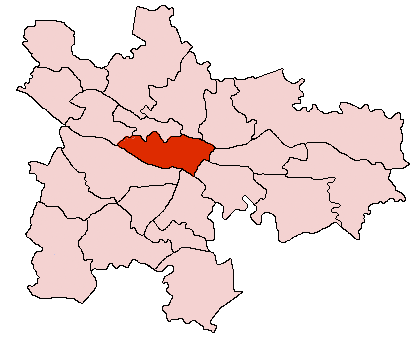
Anderston/City within Glasgow

=== Ward 11: Hillhead (4 seats) ===
2007 Council election: Hillhead
Party	Candidate	FPv%	Count							
Party	Candidate	FPv%	1	2	3	4	5	6	7	8
SNP	George A Roberts	21.14	1,899							
Scottish Green	Martha Ferguson Wardrop	18.64	1,675	1,705	1,709	1,778	1,924			
Liberal Democrats	Kenneth Elder	13.18	1,184	1,193	1,196	1,214	1,245	1,276	1,562	1,926
Labour	Hanzala Malik (Note: Outgoing councillor for Woodlands single-member ward.)	13.27	1,192	1,196	1,197	1,203	1,267	1,277	1,379	1,433
Labour	Martin Rhodes	12.02	1,080	1,085	1,088	1,092	1,114	1,125	1,160	1,288
Conservative	John Anderson	10.15	912	918	930	932	941	945	974	
Liberal Democrats	Abdul A Khan	5.15	463	469	477	490	526	554		
Solidarity	Akhter Khan	3.83	344	354	362	411				
Scottish Socialist	Anthea Irwin	2.05	184	187	194					
Independent	Neil Craig	0.57	51	51						
Electorate: 20,826 Valid: 8,984 Spoilt: 144 Quota: 1,797 Turnout: 43.84%

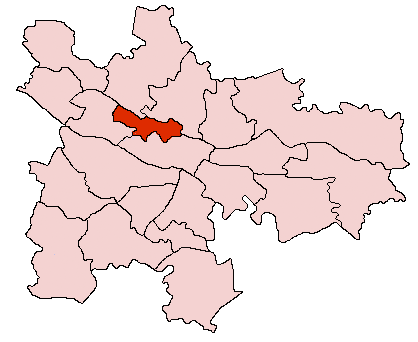
Hillhead within Glasgow

=== Ward 12: Partick West (4 seats) ===
2007 Council election: Partick West
Party	Candidate	FPv%	Count						
Party	Candidate	FPv%	1	2	3	4	5	6	7
SNP	Kenny McLean	22.06	2,811						
Liberal Democrats	Christopher Mason (Note: Outgoing councillor for Jordanhill single-member ward.)	17.73	2,259	2,300	2,325	2,354	2,411	2,910	
Labour	Aileen Colleran (Note: Outgoing councillor for Partick single-member ward.)	16.47	2,099	2,115	2,128	2,150	2,199	2,275	2,316
Scottish Green	Stuart Clay	12.51	1,594	1,652	1,744	1,789	1,963	2,175	2,304
Labour	Irene Graham (Note: Outgoing councillor for Victoria Park single-member ward.)	13.33	1,699	1,716	1,732	1,741	1,785	1,866	1,920
Conservative	Richard Alan Sullivan	11.02	1,404	1,419	1,419	1,529			
Solidarity	Jimmy Ross	2.93	373	402	465	472			
Scottish Unionist	George Aytoun Atkinson	2.08	265	268	271				
Scottish Socialist	Andrew Gray	1.88	240	253					
Electorate: 23,574 Valid: 12,744 Spoilt: 197 Quota: 2,549 Turnout: 54.90%

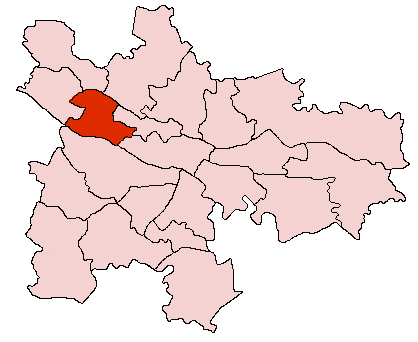
Partick West within Glasgow

=== Ward 13: Garscadden/Scotstounhill (4 seats) ===
2007 Council election: Garscadden/Scotstounhill
Party	Candidate	FPv%	Count							
Party	Candidate	FPv%	1	2	3	4	5	6	7	8
Labour	Liz Cameron (Note: Outgoing councillor for Knightswood South single-member ward.)	27.01	2,744							
SNP	Graeme Hendry	22.96	2,333							
Labour	Paul Rooney	18.65	1,895	2,007	2,026	2,037				
Labour	Jean McFadden (Note: Outgoing councillor for Scotstoun single-member ward.)	10.97	1,115	1,450	1,478	1,500	1,503	1,523	1,576	1,681
Scottish Green	Sue England	3.96	402	426	464	500	500	517	640	820
Conservative	Matthew T Smith	5.26	534	544	557	558	558	652	659	746
Liberal Democrats	James Paris	4.75	483	508	544	563	563	576	614	
Solidarity	Charlotte Ahmed	3.13	318	338	375	414	414	421		
Scottish Unionist	Robert Findlay	1.88	191	201	205	214	214			
Scottish Socialist	Peter Lavelle	1.43	145	156	177					
Electorate: 20,869 Valid: 10,160 Spoilt: 215 Quota: 2,033 Turnout: 49.71%

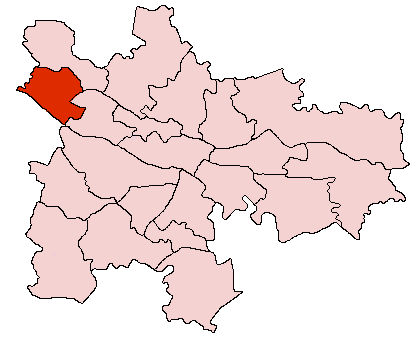
Garscadden/Scotstounhill within Glasgow

=== Ward 14: Drumchapel/Anniesland (4 seats) ===
2007 Council election:Drumchapel/Anniesland
Party	Candidate	FPv%	Count						
Party	Candidate	FPv%	1	2	3	4	5	6	7
Labour	Paul Carey (Note: Outgoing councillor for Summerhill single-member ward.)	26.31	2,284						
SNP	Bill Kidd	21.53	1,869						
Labour	Steven Purcell (Note: Outgoing councillor for Blairdardie single-member ward.)	21.38	1,856						
Labour	Jonathan Findlay (Note: Outgoing councillor for Anniesland single-member ward.)	12.70	1,102	1,374	1,385	1,445	1,455	1,476	1,524
Conservative	Susan McCourt	4.75	412	419	425	428	517	520	535
Liberal Democrats	Alan Lee	4.02	349	364	379	385	400	415	454
Scottish Green	Eileen Margaret Cartner Duke	3.00	260	283	300	305	319	361	428
Solidarity	Esther Nixon	2.57	223	243	259	263	267	321	
Scottish Socialist	Mike Dyer	1.71	148	175	186	191	197		
Scottish Unionist	Bobby Howie	2.04	177	184	188	190			
Electorate: 20,398 Valid: 8,680 Spoilt: 214 Quota: 1,737 Turnout: 43.60%

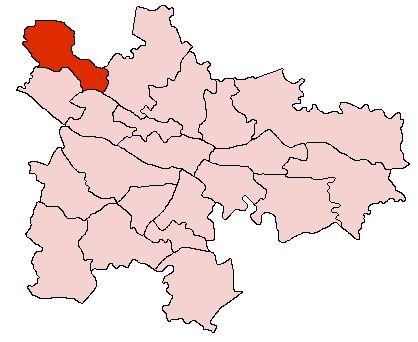
Drumchapel/Anniesland within Glasgow

=== Ward 15: Maryhill/Kelvin (4 seats) ===
2007 Council election: Maryhill/Kelvin
Party	Candidate	FPv%	Count					
Party	Candidate	FPv%	1	2	3	4	5	6
SNP	Alex Dingwall†††	25.87	2,561					
Labour	Bob Winter (Note: Outgoing councillor for Summerston single-member ward.)	19.67	1,948	1,989				
Liberal Democrats	Mary Paris (Note: Outgoing councillor for Kelvindale single-member ward.)	16.18	1,602	1,692	1,693	1,728	1,808	2,212
Labour	Mohammed Razaq (Note: Outgoing councillor for Maryhill single-member ward.)	15.61	1,546	1,591	1,596	1,631	1,710	1,855
Conservative	Brian Clifford Pope	9.52	943	978	978	985	994	1,058
Scottish Green	Daryl L Tayar	7.12	705	781	782	863	981	
Solidarity	Paul Wilcox	3.44	341	402	473			
Scottish Socialist	John Lawson	2.58	255	319	320			
Electorate: 21,630 Valid: 9,901 Spoilt: 177 Quota: 1,981 Turnout: 46.59%

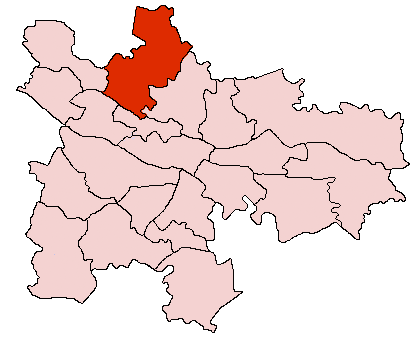
Maryhill/Kelvin within Glasgow

=== Ward 16: Canal (4 seats) ===
2007 Council election: Canal
Party	Candidate	FPv%	Count								
Party	Candidate	FPv%	1	2	3	4	5	6	7	8	9
SNP	Billy McAllister (Note: Outgoing councillor for Milton single-member ward.)	29.15	2,514								
Labour	Ellen Hurcombe (Note: Outgoing councillor for Ashfield single-member ward.)†††††††††††	22.74	1,961								
Labour	Jim MacKechnie (Note: Outgoing councillor for North Kelvin single-member ward.)	12.23	1,055	1,118	1,247	1,263	1,274	1,288	1,333	1,393	1,692
Scottish Green	Kieran Wild	8.15	703	793	797	809	819	887	929	1,115	1,157
Liberal Democrats	Norman Fraser	6.81	587	651	658	673	693	711	814	861	905
Labour	Haleema Malik (Note: Outgoing councillor for Firhill single-member ward.)	6.71	579	608	631	637	644	653	673	729	
Solidarity	Angela McCormick	4.93	425	544	553	567	584	648	660		
Conservative	David E Ledgerwood	3.92	338	358	361	368	451	453			
Scottish Socialist	Kirsteen Redpath	2.03	175	222	224	231	235				
Scottish Unionist	Brian Brown	2.24	193	214	217	225					
Independent	James Cruickshank	1.09	94	119	120						
Electorate: 22,344 Valid: 8,624 Spoilt: 264 Quota: 1,725 Turnout: 39.78%

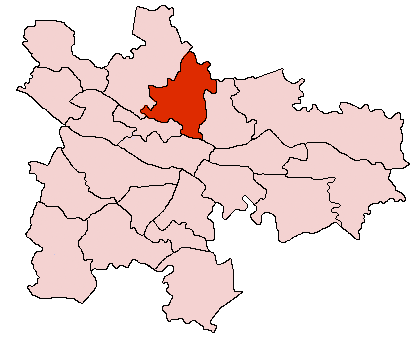
Canal within Glasgow

=== Ward 17: Springburn (3 seats) ===
2007 Council election: Springburn
Party	Candidate	FPv%	Count	
Party	Candidate	FPv%	1	2
Labour	Allan Stewart (Note: Outgoing councillor for Cowlairs single-member ward.)	32.38	1,752	
SNP	Phil Greene	24.03	1,300	1,437
Labour	James Todd (Note: Outgoing councillor for Springburn single-member ward.)	21.98	1,189	1,327
Solidarity	Graham Campbell	6.27	339	351
Conservative	Graeme Dickson	3.20	173	176
Liberal Democrats	John H Stuart	3.11	168	176
Scottish Green	Patrick McAleer	2.48	134	140
Scottish Socialist	Margaret Bean	2.50	135	139
BNP	Kenny Smith	2.50	135	137
Scottish Unionist	Robert G. C. Sawers	1.57	85	86
Electorate: 15,496 Valid: 5,410 Spoilt: 235 Quota: 1,353 Turnout: 43.60%

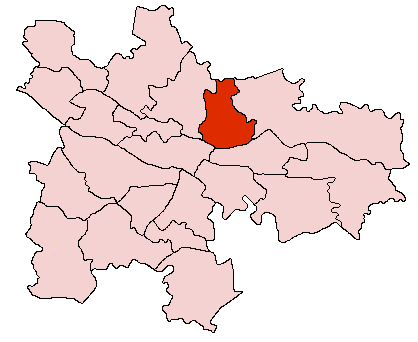
Springburn within Glasgow

=== Ward 18: East Centre (4 seats) ===
2007 Council election: East Centre
Party	Candidate	FPv%	Count										
Party	Candidate	FPv%	1	2	3	4	5	6	7	8	9	10	11
SNP	Jennifer Dunn	21.69	1,969										
Labour	Patricia Chalmers (Note: Outgoing councillor for Carntyne single-member ward.)	19.74	1,792	1,801	1,811	1,821							
Labour	Frank Docherty	14.07	1,277	1,288	1,294	1,300	1,303	1,316	1,377	1,411	1,486	1,526	1,627
Labour	Elaine McDougall (Note: Outgoing councillor for Milnbank single-member ward.)	11.45	1,039	1,046	1,049	1,057	1,058	1,067	1,101	1,134	1,191	1,243	1,314
Scottish Green	Elaine Cooper	5.19	471	490	495	501	501	521	533	585	740	829	1,038
Solidarity	Jim Adams	6.12	556	575	583	587	587	607	626	722	771	797	
Conservative	Randle Wilson	4.22	383	387	400	460	460	539	561	566	626		
Liberal Democrats	Stuart Grieve	5.07	460	474	480	491	492	495	511	531			
Scottish Socialist	Daniel O'Donnell	3.56	323	334	336	341	341	351	372				
CPA	John Kerr	2.97	270	273	316	319	319	328					
BNP	William McLachlan	2.49	226	229	231	256	256						
Scottish Unionist	Drew Dickie	1.93	175	176	178								
Scottish Christian	David Johnston	1.51	137	140									
Electorate: 21,119 Valid: 9,078 Spoilt: 290 Quota: 1,816 Turnout: 44.36%

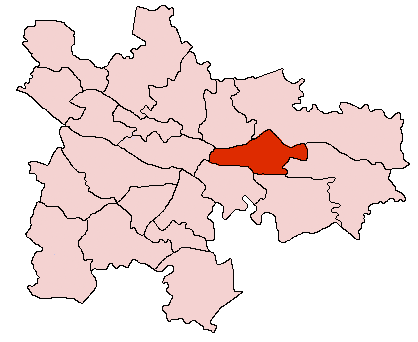
East Centre within Glasgow

=== Ward 19: Shettleston (4 seats) ===
2007 Council election: Shettleston
Party	Candidate	FPv%	%	Seat	Count
SNP	John F. McLaughlin	1,896	21.5		
Labour	Tom McKeown (Note: Outgoing councillor for Tollcross Park single-member ward.)	1,861	21.1		
Labour	George Ryan (Note: Outgoing councillor for Shettleston single-member ward.)	1,386	15.7		
Labour	Euan McLeod (Note: Outgoing councillor for Mount Vernon single-member ward.)	1,369	15.6		
Conservative	Alex White	565	6.4		
Solidarity	Wheatley Harris	458	5.2		
Liberal Democrats	David Jackson	420	4.8		
BNP	Walter Hamilton	268	3.0		
Scottish Green	Catherine Maguire	227	2.6		
Scottish Unionist	Gordon Kirker	190	2.2		
Scottish Socialist	Mick Eyre	163	1.9		

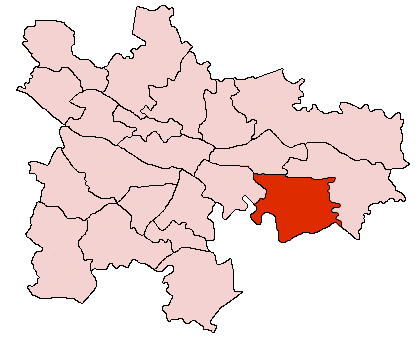
Shettleston within Glasgow

=== Ward 20: Baillieston (4 seats) ===
2007 Council election: Baillieston
Party	Candidate	FPv%	%	Seat	Count
SNP	John Mason (Note: Outgoing councillor for Garrowhill single-member ward.)	3,199	30.8		
Labour	Jim Coleman (Note: Outgoing councillor for Barlanark single-member ward.)	2,689	25.9		
Labour	Douglas Hay	1,342	12.9		
Labour	Robert MacBean (Note: Outgoing councillor for Baillieston single-member ward.)	739	7.1		
Conservative	George Clark	678	6.5		
Solidarity	Michael Kayes	466	4.5		
Liberal Democrats	Marjory Watt	392	3.8		
SNP	David McDonald	250	2.4		
Scottish Socialist	Jim McVicar	224	2.2		
Scottish Unionist	Ian Dickie	216	2.1		
Scottish Green	Raymond Morrison	181	1.7		

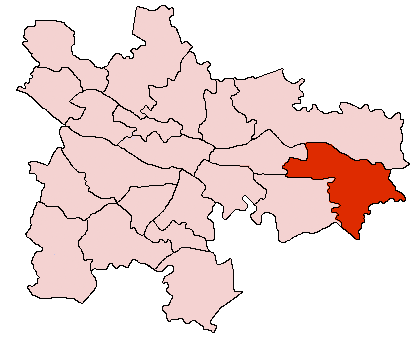
Baillieston within Glasgow

=== Ward 21: North East (4 seats) ===
2007 Council election: North East
Party	Candidate	FPv%	%	Seat	Count
Labour	Gilbert Davidson	2,272	27.1		
SNP	Grant R Thoms	2,098	25.1		
Labour	Gerald Leonard (Note: Outgoing councillor for Gartcraig single-member ward.)	1,475	17.6		
Labour	Catherine McMaster (Note: Outgoing councillor for Garthamlock single-member ward.)	1,040	12.4		
Conservative	John France	485	5.8		
Solidarity	Joanne Reilly	350	4.2		
Liberal Democrats	John C MacPherson	228	2.7		
Scottish Green	Stewart MacDonald	186	2.2		
Scottish Socialist	Andy McPake	129	1.5		
Independent	George Savage	100	1.2		

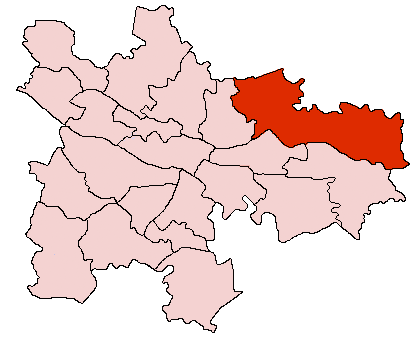
North East within Glasgow

== Changes since 2007 ==
- †On 20 December 2007, Craigton Cllr Ruth Black left Solidarity and joined the Labour Party. On 9 February 2012 she resigned from the party and became an Independent.
- ††On 12 December 2008, Newlands/Auldburn Cllr Colin Deans left the Scottish National Party and joined the Labour Party. On 7 January 2009 he announced he would sit as an Independent and not join the Labour Party.
- †††On 9 February 2010, Maryhill/Kelvin Cllr Alex Dingwall left the Scottish National Party and joined the Liberal Democrats.
- ††††In March 2011, Greater Pollok Cllr William O'Rourke was suspended from the Labour Party. He was expelled on 6 February 2012 and is now an Independent.
- †††††On 30 January 2012 Pollokshields Cllr Irfan Rabbani resigned from the Labour Party and joined the Scottish National Party.
- ††††††On 2 February 2012 Govan Cllr Stephen Dornan resigned from the Labour Party and is now an Independent.
- †††††††On 8 February 2012 Southside Central Cllr Anne Marie Millar resigned from the Labour Party and is now an Independent.
- ††††††††On 8 February 2012 Ballieston Cllr Andy Muir resigned from the Labour Party and is now an Independent.
- †††††††††On 9 February 2012 Greater Pollok Cllr Tommy Morrison resigned from the Labour Party and is now an Independent.
- ††††††††††On 14 March 2012 Govan Cllr Shaukat Butt resigned from the Labour Party and is now an Independent.
- †††††††††††On 27 March 2012 Canal Cllr Ellen Hurcombe resigned from the Labour Party and is now an Independent.

== By-elections since 3 May 2007 ==
- On 18 September 2008, a by-election was held following the election of John Mason as an MP for Glasgow East on 25 July 2008. The by-election was won by the SNP's David Turner.

Baillieston by-election (18 September 2008) - 1 seat
Party	Candidate	FPv%	Count								
Party	Candidate	FPv%	1	2	3	4	5	6	7	8	9
SNP	David Turner	44.6	2,318	2,320	2,330	2,344	2,355	2,381	2,415	2,511	3,131
Labour	Andy Muir	41.7	2,167	2,168	2,171	2,186	2,189	2,208	2,264	2,313	
Conservative	John Anderson	5.0	259	272	273	274	304	310	340		
Liberal Democrats	David Jackson	3.1	159	162	171	176	176	180			
Solidarity	Tricia McLeish	1.4	74	76	80	96	105				
BNP	Charles Baillie	1.4	73	79	81	81					
Scottish Socialist	Daniel O'Donnell	1.1	58	58	61						
Scottish Green	Moira Crawford	0.9	45	46							
Scottish Unionist	Ian Dickie	0.8	43								
Electorate: 23,202 Valid: 5,196 Spoilt: 65 Quota: 2,599 Turnout: 5,261 (22.7%)

- On 6 November 2008, a by-election was held following the death of Labour Cllr David Hay on 27 September 2008. The by-election was won by Labour's Andy Muir.††††††††

Baillieston by-election (6 November 2008) - 1 seat
Party	Candidate	FPv%	Count						
Party	Candidate	FPv%	1	2	3	4	5	6	7
Labour	Andy Muir	46.8	2,257	2,260	2,263	2,286	2,335	2,383	3,124
SNP	David Cassidy	42.1	2,027	2,037	2,046	2,074	2,116	2,193	
Conservative	John Anderson	4.7	226	231	245	249	269		
Liberal Democrats	David Jackson	2.9	142	146	146	154			
Scottish Socialist	Daniel O'Donnell	1.8	88	93	97				
BNP	Charles Baillie	1.0	46	46					
Scottish Green	Moira Crawford	0.7	32						
Electorate: 23,131 Valid: 4,818 Spoilt: 58 Quota: 2,410 Turnout: 4,876 (21.0%)

- On 4 June 2009, a by-election was held following the resignation of SNP MSP Bill Kidd as a Councillor. The by-election was won by Labour's Anne McTaggart.

Drumchapel/Anniesland by-election (4 June 2009) - 1 seat
Party	Candidate	FPv%	Count				
Party	Candidate	FPv%	1	2	3	4	5
Labour	Anne McTaggart	48.4	2,584	2,593	2,613	2,651	2,689
SNP	Martin J Docherty	28.3	1,509	1,530	1,573	1,651	1,698
Liberal Democrats	Nathalie McKee	6.5	349	362	373	443	532
Conservative	Richard Alan Sullivan	5.9	316	327	359	366	
Scottish Green	Eileen Duke	5.1	270	284	295		
BNP	John Robertson	3.3	177	186			
Independent	James Trolland	2.4	129				
Electorate: 20,141 Valid: 5,334 Spoilt: 84 Quota: 2,667 Turnout: 5,418 (26.9%)

- On 6 May 2010, a by-election was held following the resignation of Labour Councillor Stephen Purcell. The by-election was won by Labour's Christopher Hughes.

Drumchapel/Anniesland by-election (6 May 2010) - 1 seat
Party	Candidate	FPv%	Count
Party	Candidate	FPv%	1
Labour	Christopher Hughes	56.3	5,710
SNP	Frank Rankin	21.7	2,197
Liberal Democrats	Paul McGarry	11.3	1,143
Conservative	Richard Alan Sullivan	7.0	710
Scottish Green	Larry Butler	3.7	375
Electorate: 19,951 Valid: 10,030 Spoilt: 239 Quota: 5,016 Turnout: 10,269 (51.47%)

- On 17 November 2011, a by-election was held following the death of SNP Councillor George Roberts. The seat was held by the SNP's Ken Andrew.

Hillhead by-election (17 November 2011) - 1 seat
Party	Candidate	FPv%	Count						
Party	Candidate	FPv%	1	2	3	4	5	6	7
SNP	Ken Andrew	32.75	1,026	1,027	1,030	1,079	1,174	1,386	1,851
Labour	Martin McElroy	30.17	945	946	950	992	1,057	1,276	
Scottish Green	Stuart Leckie	13.88	435	436	441	556	639		
Conservative	Maya Forrest	11.87	372	374	384	441			
Liberal Democrats	Ewan Hoyle	9.80	307	310	311				
UKIP	Neil Craig	1.14	36	37					
Britannica Party	Charles Baillie	0.35	11						
Electorate: 23,243 Valid: 3,132 Spoilt: 40 Quota: 1,567 Turnout: 3,172 (13.65%)
