= Anne McTaggart =

Scottish SNP politician

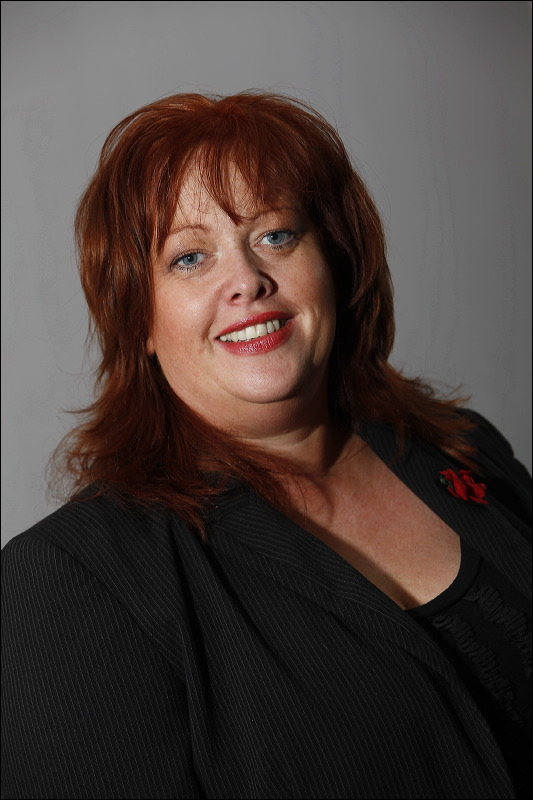

Member of the Scottish Parliament for Glasgow
- In office 5 May 2011 – 24 March 2016

Personal details
- Born: 30 January 1970 (age 56) Coatbridge, Scotland
- Party: Scottish National Party (2019–present)
- Other political affiliations: Scottish Labour (Pre-2019)
- Education: University of Strathclyde
- Committees: Local Government and Regeneration, Public Petitions
- Website: www.annemctaggart.co.uk

Anne Margaret McTaggart (born 30 January 1970) is a Scottish National Party (SNP) politician, and a Glasgow city councillor. She was previously a Scottish Labour Member of the Scottish Parliament (MSP) for the Glasgow region from 2011 to 2016.

== Background ==
Anne McTaggart was a Community Development worker and chair of the local school Blairdardie Primary's parents council, before being elected to Glasgow City Council in a by-election in 2009.

== Political career ==
McTaggart was a member of the Glasgow Labour Women's Forum and the Co-operative Party.

=== Councillor ===
She was elected as a Councillor in the Drumchapel/Anniesland ward of Glasgow City Council at a by-election (on 4 June 2009). The seat was previously held by SNP MSP Bill Kidd, who resigned in April 2009 to focus on his parliamentary activities by ending his dual mandate as councillor and MSP.

She sat on five Committees, including the Personnel Appeals Committee, and was a member of the Education Children and Families Policy Development Committee and the West Local Community Planning Partnership. In addition she was a Councillor member of Glasgow Regeneration Agency 2011 Ltd.

A year after becoming an MSP, she did not seek re-election to Glasgow City Council in the 2012 local election, thus ending her dual mandate.

=== Scottish Parliament ===
McTaggart was elected as a list MSP for the Glasgow region in the 2011 Scottish Parliament election. The result was something of a surprise, as Labour lost five local constituency seats to the SNP and had three members selected from their additional list (from none in 2007), the last of whom was McTaggart.

She was Scottish Labour's Shadow Minister for Democracy, a member of the European and External Relations Committee and a Substitute member of the Equal Opportunities Committee.

McTaggart received cross-party support to become Convener of the Cross Party Group on Poland, and Deputy Convenor of the following Scottish Parliament CPGs: Credit Unions, Social Enterprise and Tibet.

In November 2012, the BBC reported that McTaggart used her Parliamentary expenses to purchase books including Public Speaking and Presentation for Dummies, The Scottish Parliament: An Introduction and several books on Labour politician Barbara Castle. The books were purchased for her mentoring scheme to encourage access to politics for women.

In the 2016 Scottish Parliament election, McTaggart did not stand for a constituency and was selected in twelfth position on the Labour additional member list for Glasgow, effectively ending her tenure before the vote took place (a large number of the candidates listed above her would have to win their constituency seat, in addition to several more as well as her being added from the region, almost an impossibility under the proportional system).

=== Return to council ===
After losing her Holyrood seat, in the 2017 Glasgow City Council election she was returned as a Councillor, again in the Drumchapel/Anniesland ward.

In November 2019, she announced that she joined the Scottish National Party and said that the Scottish Labour was not doing a good job in Glasgow.
