= Glasgow Maryhill =

Glasgow Maryhill may refer to:

- Maryhill, Glasgow, Scotland
- Glasgow Maryhill (UK Parliament constituency)
- Glasgow Maryhill (Scottish Parliament constituency)
