= Glasgow Maryhill (Scottish Parliament constituency) =

Scottish Parliament constituency

- Former burgh constituency for the Scottish Parliament

- Glasgow Maryhill shown within the Glasgow electoral region and the region shown within Scotland

Former constituency
- Created: 1999
- Abolished: 2011
- Council area: Glasgow City

Glasgow Maryhill was a constituency of the Scottish Parliament (Holyrood). It elected one Member of the Scottish Parliament (MSP) by the plurality (first past the post) method of election. However, it was also one of ten constituencies in the Glasgow electoral region, which elects seven additional members, in addition to ten constituency MSPs, to produce a form of proportional representation for the region as a whole.

For the Scottish Parliament election, 2011 Maryhill was expanded into a newly created Maryhill and Springburn seat.

== Electoral region ==
The other nine constituencies of the Glasgow region at the time were: Glasgow Anniesland, Glasgow Baillieston, Glasgow Cathcart, Glasgow Govan, Glasgow Kelvin, Glasgow Pollok, Glasgow Rutherglen, Glasgow Shettleston and Glasgow Springburn.

The region covered the Glasgow City council area and a north-western portion of the South Lanarkshire council area.

== Constituency boundaries ==
Map of boundaries from 2005-2011

The Glasgow Maryhill constituency was created at the same time as the Scottish Parliament, in 1999, with the name and boundaries of an existing Westminster constituency. In 2005, however, Scottish Westminster (House of Commons) constituencies were mostly replaced with new constituencies.

The Holyrood constituency was entirely within the Glasgow City council area, on its northern boundary. It was west of the Springburn constituency, north of Kelvin and east of Anniesland, which were also entirely within the city area.

=== Boundary review ===
Following their First Periodic review into constituencies to the Scottish Parliament in time for the 2011 election, the Boundary Commission for Scotland has recommended the effective merger of the Glasgow Springburn and Glasgow Maryhill constituencies. The new creation is a constituency known as Glasgow Maryhill and Springburn.

== Member of the Scottish Parliament ==
Election	Member	Party
1999	Patricia Ferguson	Labour

== Election results ==
2007 Scottish Parliament election: Glasgow Maryhill
Party	Candidate	Votes	%	±%
Labour	Patricia Ferguson	7,955	48.0	−1.3
SNP	Bob Doris	5,645	34.1	+14.2
Liberal Democrats	Kenneth Elder	1,936	11.7	+1.9
Conservative	Heather MacLeod	1,028	6.2	+1.3
Majority		2,310	13.9	−15.5
Turnout		16,564	36.0	−1.1
Labour hold		Swing		

2003 Scottish Parliament election: Glasgow Maryhill
Party	Candidate	Votes	%	±%
Labour	Patricia Ferguson	8,997	49.32	−0.46
SNP	Bill Wilson	3,629	19.89	−11.09
Scottish Socialist	Donnie Nicolson	2,945	16.14	+9.89
Liberal Democrats	Arthur Sanderson	1,789	9.78	+1.88
Conservative	Robert Erskine	887	4.86	−0.33
Majority		5,368	29.42	+10.62
Turnout		18,243	37.14	−3.61
Labour hold		Swing		

1999 Scottish Parliament election: Glasgow Maryhill
Party	Candidate	Votes	%	±%
Labour	Patricia Ferguson	11,455	49.78	N/A
SNP	Bill Wilson	7,129	30.98	N/A
Liberal Democrats	Clare Hamblen	1,793	7.79	N/A
Scottish Socialist	Gordon Scott	1,439	6.25	N/A
Conservative	Michael Fry	1,194	5.19	N/A
Majority		4,326	18.80	N/A
Turnout		26,080		N/A
Labour win (new seat)				

== See also ==
- Politics of Glasgow
