= St Thomas Aquinas Secondary School, Glasgow =

Saint Thomas Aquinas R.C. Secondary School
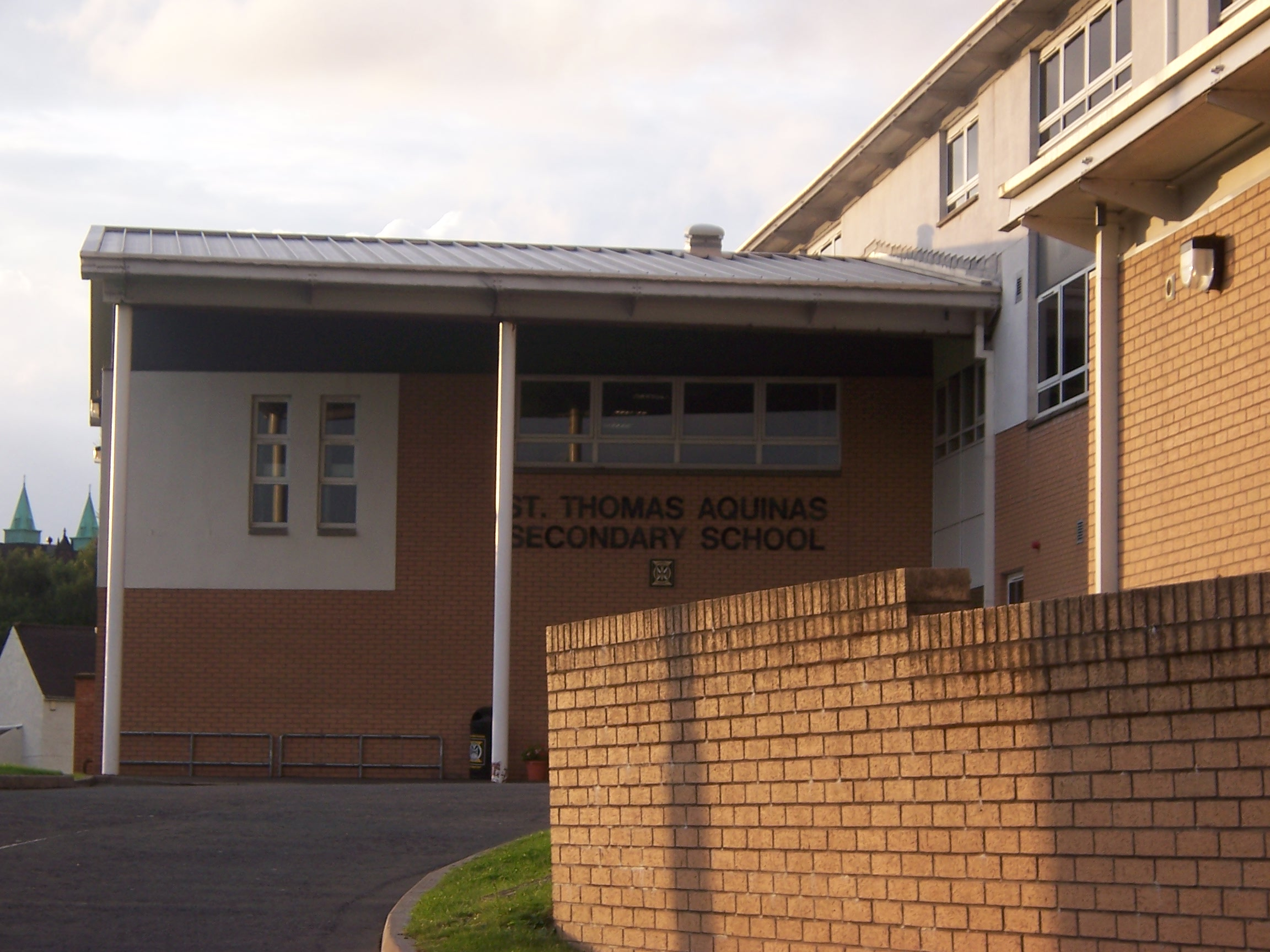
- Main entrance

Location
- 112 Mitre Road; Glasgow, G14 9PP; Scotland; 55.8809°N 4.3352°W

Information
- Type: State comprehensive
- Motto: Summa Aquinas
- Religious affiliation: Roman Catholic
- Established: 1958
- Authority: Glasgow City Council
- Head teacher: Claire McInally
- Chaplain: Steven McInally
- Teaching staff: 43
- Gender: Mixed
- Age: 11 to 18
- Enrollment: c. 1187 pupils
- Website: School website

St Thomas Aquinas Secondary School is a Catholic secondary school in Jordanhill, Glasgow. The current head teacher is Claire McInally, who took over at the beginning of the 2019-2020 session. The previous head teacher was Andrew McSorley who headed the school for 13 years from 2006 to 2019.

== Re-building ==
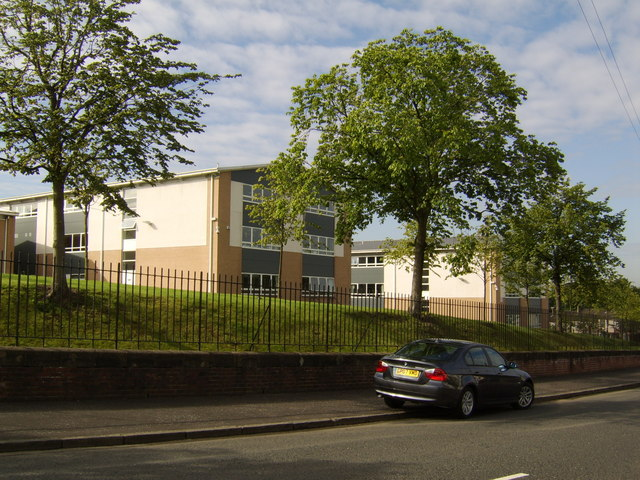
The current school, constructed in 2003

The original school was built in the 1950s, and at the end of the 2001/2002 school year the original building was demolished to make way for a new one. During the rebuilding works staff and pupils were temporarily based at Woodside School, close to the city's Anderston area. The new facility consists of the Abbey Building and the Mitre Building, and was built as part of Glasgow's PPP school building programme. The new building was completed in 2003 and the school was officially opened on 3 December 2004 by the then Education convener of Glasgow City Council, Steven Purcell, a former pupil. The new school is one of the largest Roman Catholic schools in the city and has a capacity of over a thousand pupils.

=== The expressive arts ===
In 2007 the school produced a version of Romeo and Juliet which received national media attention as it brought to life issues relating to sectarianism.

In 2008 ten St Thomas' pupils were chosen to represent Scotland at the World Schools' Orienteering Championships.

== Notable former pupils ==
- Graeme Pearson (born 1950), police officer and politician, Member of the Scottish Parliament (MSP) for the South Scotland region (2011–2016)
- Tosh McKinlay (born 1964), footballer, Dundee F.C., Heart of Midlothian F.C., Celtic F.C. and Kilmarnock F.C. He also played for Stoke City F.C. and Grasshopper Club Zürich. He won 22 caps for Scotland national football team
- Carol Monaghan (born 1972), Scottish National Party (SNP) politician, Member of Parliament (MP) for Glasgow North West (2015- )
- James McAvoy (born 1979), Actor
- Joseph Andrew Mclean (born 1979), Filmmaker
- Joy McAvoy (born 1982), Actress
- Hudson Mohawke (born 1986), Producer and DJ
- Steven Purcell, Scottish Labour Party politician, councillor for the Drumchapel/Anniesland ward of Glasgow City Council, Leader of the council (2005–2010)
