= Jill McGowan =

Jill McGowan may refer to:

- Jill McGowan, fictional character in Village of the Damned (1995 film)
- Jill McGowan, see Glasgow City Council election, 2007
