= Patricia Ferguson =

British politician (born 1958)

Patricia Ferguson MP
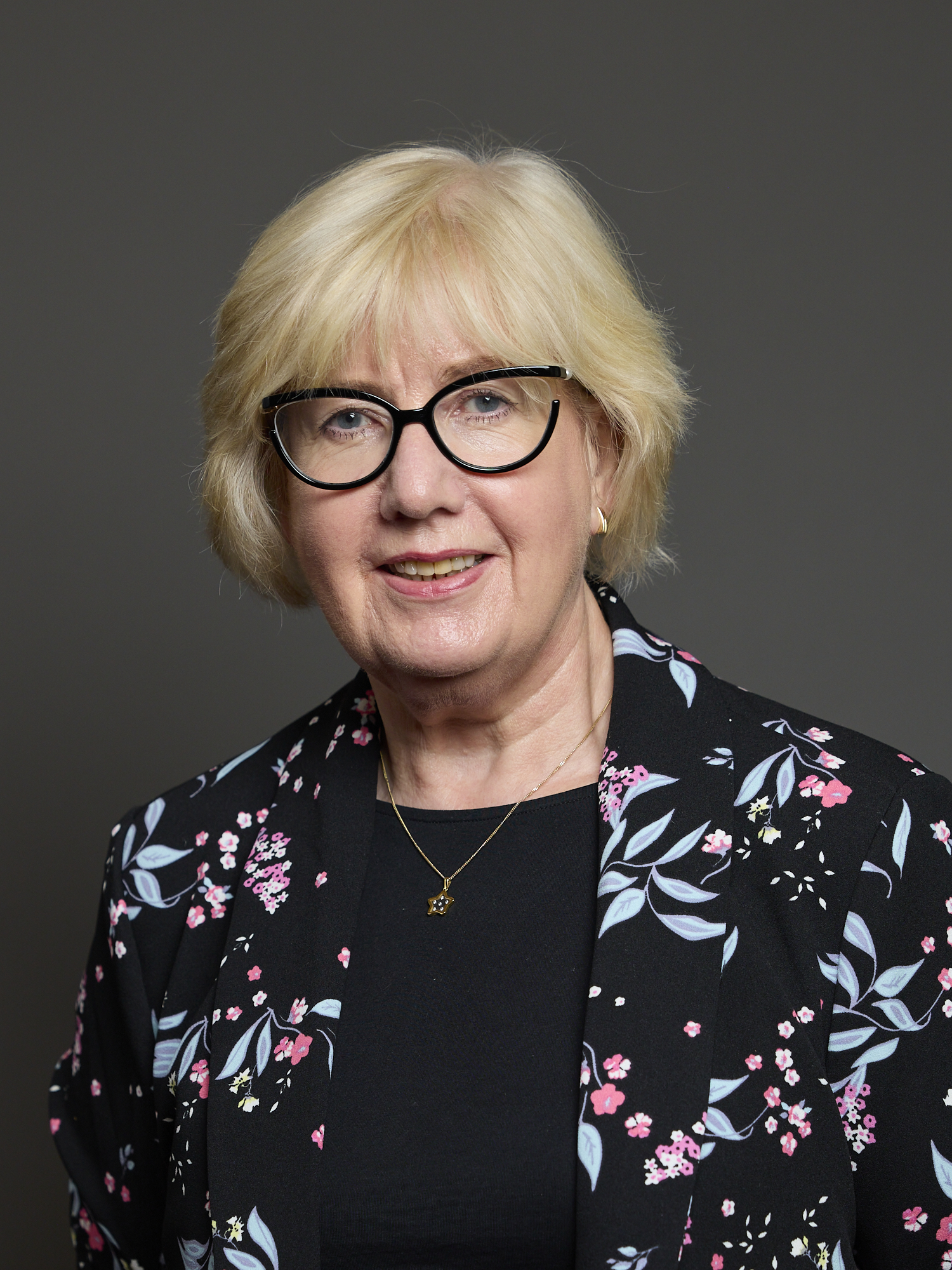
- Official portrait, 2024

Chair of the Scottish Affairs Select Committee
- Incumbent
- Assumed office 12 September 2024
- Preceded by: Pete Wishart

Minister for Tourism, Culture and Sport
- In office 4 October 2004 – 17 May 2007
- First Minister: Jack McConnell
- Preceded by: Frank McAveety
- Succeeded by: Linda Fabiani

Minister for Parliamentary Business
- In office 27 November 2001 – 4 October 2004
- First Minister: Jack McConnell
- Preceded by: Tom McCabe
- Succeeded by: Margaret Curran

Deputy Presiding Officer of the Scottish Parliament
- In office 12 May 1999 – 27 November 2001 Serving with George Reid
- Presiding Officer: David Steel
- Preceded by: Office established
- Succeeded by: Murray Tosh

Member of Parliament for Glasgow West
- Incumbent
- Assumed office 4 July 2024
- Preceded by: Constituency created
- Majority: 6,446 (16.2%)

Member of Glasgow City Council for Drumchapel/Anniesland
- In office 5 May 2022 – 2 September 2024
- Preceded by: Elspeth Kerr
- Succeeded by: Davena Rankin

Member of the Scottish Parliament for Glasgow Maryhill and Springburn Glasgow Maryhill (1999–2011)
- In office 6 May 1999 – 24 March 2016
- Preceded by: Office established
- Succeeded by: Bob Doris

Personal details
- Born: Patricia Josephine Ferguson; 24 September 1958 (age 68) Glasgow, Scotland
- Party: Labour
- Spouse: Bill Butler
- Education: Glasgow College of Technology (HNC)

Patricia Josephine Ferguson (born 24 September 1958) is a Scottish politician who has served as Member of Parliament (MP) for Glasgow West since 2024. Ferguson previously served as a Member of the Scottish Parliament (MSP) for Glasgow Maryhill and Springburn, previously Glasgow Maryhill, from 1999 to 2016. A member of the Labour Party, she was in the Scottish Cabinet under First Minister Jack McConnell from 2001 to 2007.

Ferguson was also a Glasgow City Council Councillor, until her resignation on 2 September 2024. She currently chairs the Scottish Affairs Select Committee in the House of Commons.

== Early life and career ==
Ferguson was educated at Garnethill Convent Secondary School in Glasgow between 1970 and 1976, and at Glasgow College of Technology, where she obtained an HNC in Public Administration in 1978. She spent part of her childhood living in the city's Red Road Flats.

Prior to entering the Scottish Parliament, she worked as a administrator in NHS Scotland between 1978 and 1990, with the Scottish Trades Union Congress between 1990 and 1994, and with the Scottish Labour Party between 1994 and 1999.

== Scottish Parliamentary career (1999–2016) ==
She was first elected as an MSP in 1999 for the newly created Glasgow Maryhill constituency, a seat she held until 2011 when Glasgow Maryhill was merged with other constituencies to form the Glasgow Maryhill and Springburn constituency. She won the 2011 Glasgow Maryhill and Springburn election but lost her seat in 2016 to Scottish National Party (SNP) member Bob Doris.

After being elected as MSP for Glasgow Maryhill in May 1999, she was Deputy Presiding Officer of the Scottish Parliament from 1999 until 2001 and as a member of several of the Parliament's Standards and Procedures Committees.

She was first appointed to the Scottish Executive Cabinet in November 2001 as Minister for Parliament when Jack McConnell became First Minister. She became Minister for Tourism, Culture and Sport in October 2004.

In 2006, her name was included on a variant of a Nigerian scam email after a high-profile trip to Malawi as part of her Scottish Executive brief.

== Local government (2022–2024) ==
In the 2022 Glasgow City Council election, Ferguson was one of four members (including Labour colleague Paul Carey) elected to represent the Drumchapel/Anniesland ward.

== UK Parliamentary career (2024–present) ==
Ferguson was elected to the United Kingdom Parliament at the 2024 general election, defeating SNP incumbent Carol Monaghan of predecessor seat Glasgow North West. Before that, she was first runner-up to Monaghan in Glasgow North West in 2019.

On 12 September 2024, she was elected chair of the Scottish Affairs Select Committee.

== Personal life ==
She is married to former Labour MSP and councillor colleague Bill Butler.

Parliament of the United Kingdom
New constituency	Member of Parliament for Glasgow West; 2024–present	Incumbent
Scottish Parliament
New constituency	Member of the Scottish Parliament for Glasgow Maryhill and Springburn; 2011–2016	Succeeded by Bob Doris
New constituency	Member of the Scottish Parliament for Glasgow Maryhill; 1999–2011	Constituency abolished
Political offices
Preceded by Frank McAveety	Minister for Tourism, Culture and Sport; 2004–2007	Office abolished
Preceded by Tom McCabe	Minister for Parliamentary Business; 2001–2004	Succeeded by Margaret Curran
Preceded by Peter Peacock	Minister for Gaelic; 2006–2007	Succeeded by Linda Fabiani
