= Drumchapel/Anniesland (ward) =

Electoral ward in Glasgow, Scotland

Drumchapel/Anniesland: Scottish Gaelic: Druim a' Chapaill/Fearann Anna
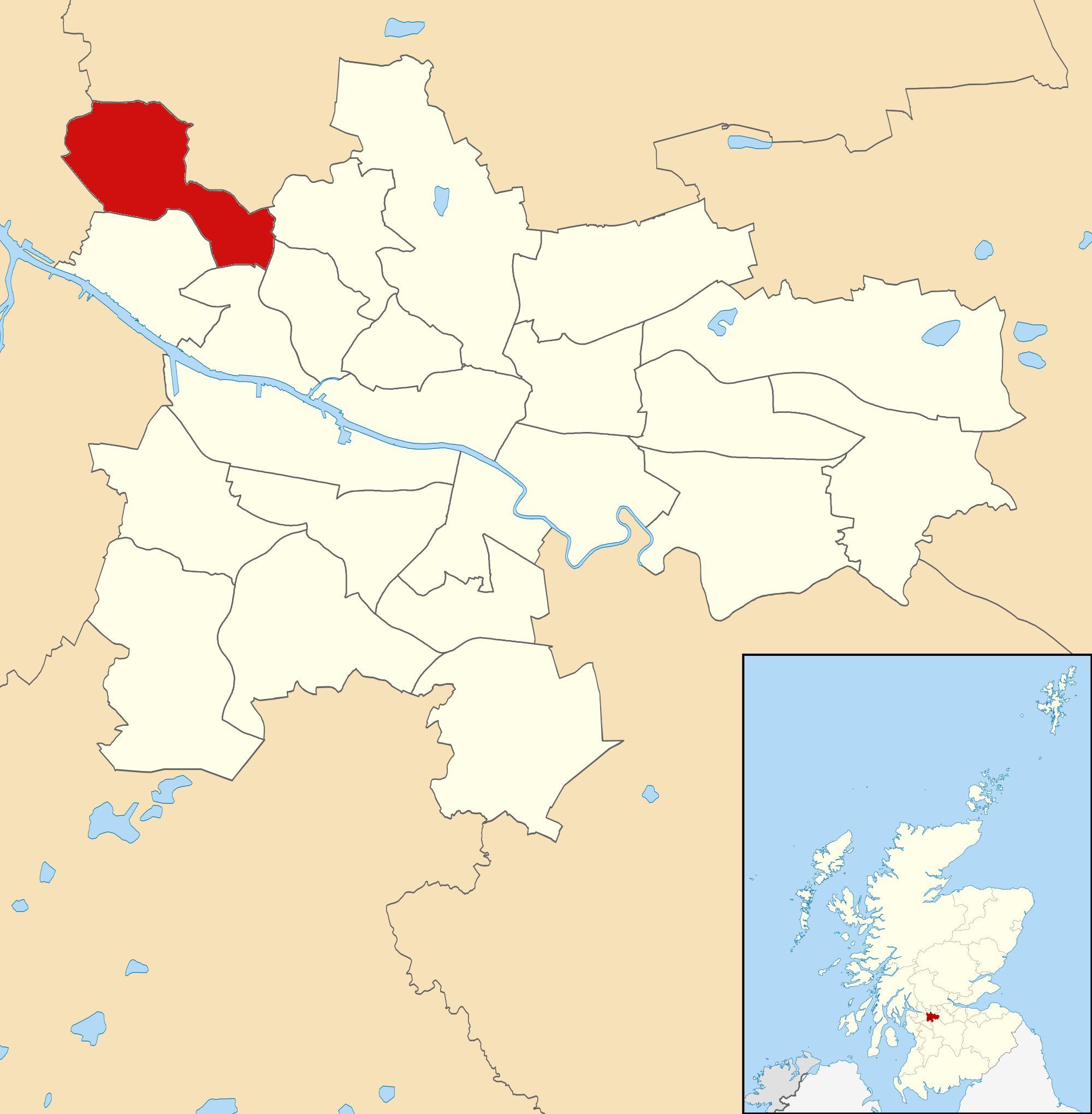
- Drumchapel/Anniesland Ward (2017) within Glasgow

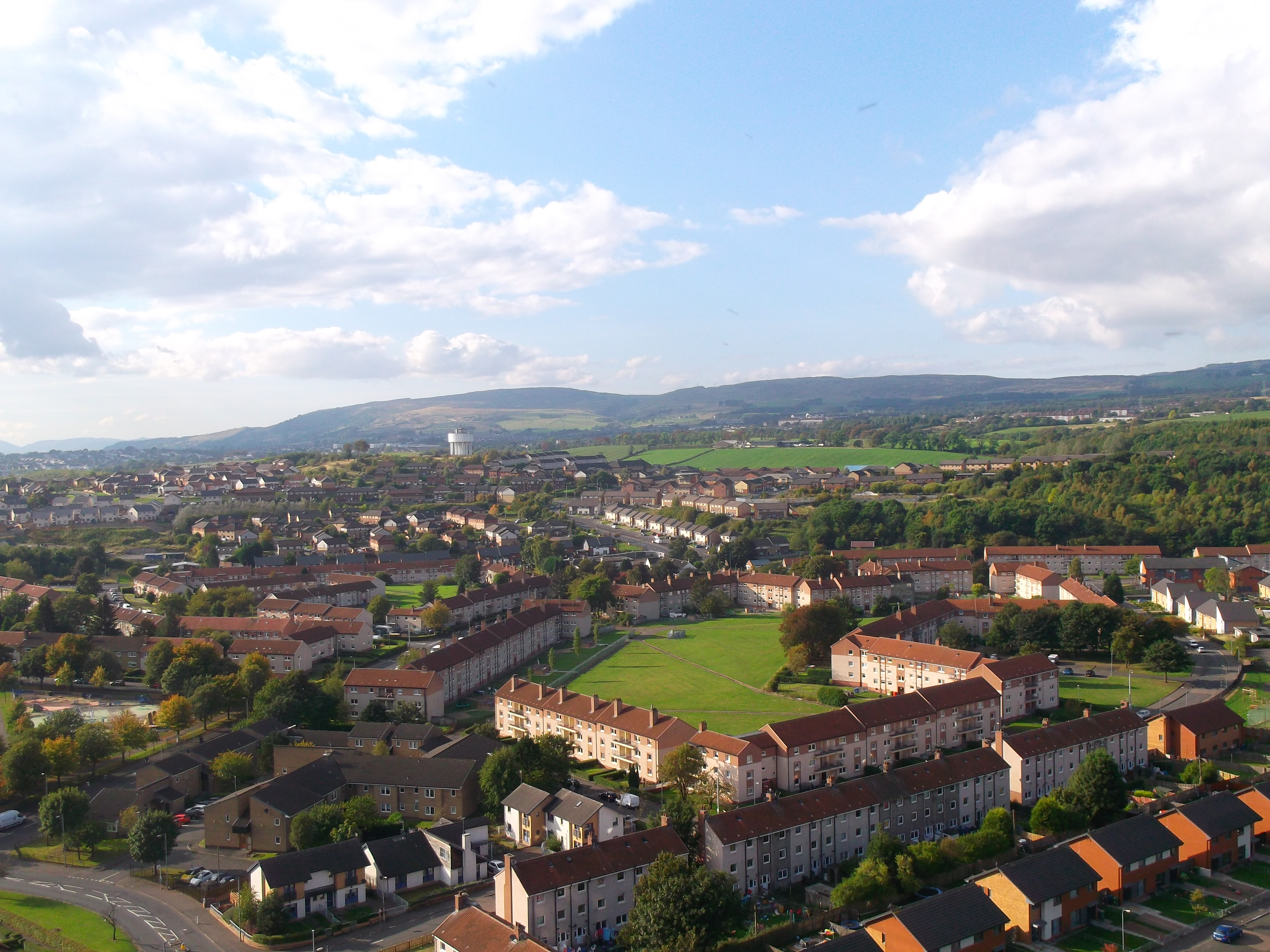
- View looking north-west over Drumchapel from Linkwood towers (2014)
- Area: 7.30 km^{2} (2.82 sq mi)
- Population: 29,432 (2015)
  - Density: 4,031.8/km^{2} (10,442/sq mi)
- Council area: Glasgow City Council
- Lieutenancy area: Glasgow
- Country: Scotland
- Sovereign state: United Kingdom
- Post town: GLASGOW
- Postcode district: G13, G15
- Dialling code: 0141
- Police: Scotland
- Fire: Scottish
- Ambulance: Scottish

Drumchapel/Anniesland (Ward 14) is one of the 23 wards of Glasgow City Council. Since its creation in 2007 it has retained the same boundaries and returned four council members, using the single transferable vote system.

== Boundaries ==
Located in the far north-west of Glasgow, the ward's western boundary is with West Dunbartonshire and its northern boundary with East Dunbartonshire. Despite its name, it contains only part of the Anniesland neighbourhood (the streets to the north of Anniesland Road, and to the north of Great Western Road, east of Anniesland Cross). It contains all of Drumchapel, Netherton, Temple, Old Drumchapel, Blairdardie and High Knightswood, and part of Knightswood (streets to the east of Great Western Road and Knightswood Road).

The ethnic makeup of the Drumchapel/Anniesland ward using the 2011 census population statistics was:

- 94.3% White Scottish / British / Irish / Other
- 3.3% Asian
- 1.8% Black (mainly African)
- 0.6% Mixed / Other Ethnic Group

== Councillors ==
Election	Councillors			
2007	Paul Carey (Labour)	Bill Kidd (SNP)	Steven Purcell (Labour)	Jonathan Findlay (Labour)
2009 by	Paul Carey (Labour)	Anne McTaggart (Labour)	Steven Purcell (Labour)	Jonathan Findlay (Labour)
2010 by	Paul Carey (Labour)	Anne McTaggart (Labour)	Christopher Hughes (Labour)	Jonathan Findlay (Labour)
2012	Paul Carey (Labour)	Judith Fisher (Labour)	Malcolm Balfour (SNP)	Jonathan Findlay (Labour)
2017	Paul Carey (Labour)	Anne McTaggart (Labour/SNP)	Malcolm Balfour (SNP)	Elspeth Kerr (SNP)
2019	Paul Carey (Labour)	Anne McTaggart (Labour/SNP)	Malcolm Balfour (SNP)	Elspeth Kerr (SNP)
2022	Paul Carey (Labour)	Anne McTaggart (Labour/SNP)	Fyeza Ikhlaq (SNP)	Patricia Ferguson (Labour)
2024	Paul Carey (Labour)	Anne McTaggart (Labour/SNP)	Fyeza Ikhlaq (SNP)	Davena Rankin (Labour)

== Election results ==
=== 2024 By-election ===
Drumchapel/Anniesland by-election (21 November 2024) − 1 seat
Party	Candidate	FPv%	Count						
Party	Candidate	FPv%	1	2	3	4	5	6	7
Labour	Davena Rankin	34.3	1,084	1,108	1,143	1,193	1,263	1,385	1,857
SNP	Adekemi Giwa	26.3	830	841	847	971	1,083	1,134	
Reform UK	Allan Douglas Lyons	12.8	405	412	461	473	524		
Independent	Elsbeth Kerr	9.4	297	310	331	372			
Green	Christopher Lavelle	8.3	263	270	275				
Conservative	Steven Morrison	5.8	184	196					
Liberal Democrats	Michael Edward Shields	2.9	93						
Electorate: 20,895 Valid: 3,156 Spoilt: 42 Quota: 1,579 Turnout: 15.3%

=== 2022 Election ===
2022 Glasgow City Council election

Drumchapel/Anniesland − 4 seats
Party	Candidate	FPv%	Count						
Party	Candidate	FPv%	1	2	3	4	5	6	7
Labour	Paul Carey (incumbent)	27.8	2,011						
SNP	Anne McTaggart (incumbent)	20.0	1,446						
SNP	Fyeza Ikhlaq	13.1	945	959	969	971	1,278	1,366	1,626
Labour	Patricia Ferguson	10.3	747	1,191	1,209	1,240	1,252	1,368	1,495
Conservative	Pauline Sutherland	9.5	689	701	701	724	727	771	792
Green	Duncan Webford	6.1	438	444	475	498	523	610	
Independent	Elspeth Kerr (incumbent)	5.2	376	409	434	454	464		
SNP	Cylina Porch	4.8	350	358	369	373			
Liberal Democrats	Richard Frank Stalley	1.6	118	122	127				
Scottish Socialist	Joe Meehan	1.5	106	112					
Electorate: 21,148 Valid: 7,226 Spoilt: 222 Quota: 1,446 Turnout: 35.2%

=== 2017 Election ===
2017 Glasgow City Council election

Drumchapel/Anniesland – 4 seats
Party	Candidate	FPv%	Count									
Party	Candidate	FPv%	1	2	3	4	5	6	7	8	9	10
Labour	Paul Carey (incumbent)	24.83%	1,871									
SNP	Malcolm Balfour (incumbent)	24.45%	1,842									
SNP	Elspeth Kerr ††††††	10.98%	827	849	1,073	1,086	1,095	1,101	1,213	1,963		
Labour	Anne McTaggart††††	12.49%	941	1,177	1,189	1,194	1,213	1,288	1,308	1,327	1,456	1,876
Conservative	Patrick Logue	11.59%	873	895	898	903	904	945	962	966	981	
SNP	Malcolm Mitchell	8.99%	678	682	733	738	747	749	829			
Green	Louisa McGuigan	4.27%	322	331	348	353	369	379				
UKIP	Bryan Free	1.25%	94	101	105	106	106					
Scottish Socialist	Joe Meehan	0.68%	51	56	58	63						
Solidarity	Gary Kelly	0.46%	35	42	48							
Electorate: 21,507 Valid: 7,534 Spoilt: 308 Quota: 1,507 Turnout: 36.5%

=== 2012 Election ===
2012 Glasgow City Council election

Drumchapel/Anniesland – 4 seats
Party	Candidate	FPv%	Count									
Party	Candidate	FPv%	1	2	3	4	5	6	7	8	9	10
Labour	Paul Carey (incumbent)	30.65%	2,075									
Labour	Jon Findlay (incumbent)	17.70%	1,198	1,552								
SNP	Malcolm Balfour	19.82%	1,342	1,388								
Labour	Judith Fisher	13.01%	881	1,079	1,235	1,236	1,241	1,243	1,247	1,274	1,328	1,378
SNP	John Docherty	9.44%	639	665	676	705	709	713	717	747	807	854
Conservative	Martyn McIntyre	3.62%	245	248	251	252	253	255	260	292	315	
Green	Alastair Whitelaw	2.63%	178	183	187	188	196	199	216	251		
Liberal Democrats	Paul McGarry	1.96%	133	139	142	143	143	146	150			
Independent	James Trolland	0.50%	34	34	35	35	39	45				
Glasgow First	Gerrard O'Neill McCue	0.30%	20	26	28	28	30					
TUSC	Eric Stevenson	0.37%	25	26	27	27						
Electorate: 21,288 Valid: 6,770 Spoilt: 180 Quota: 1,355 Turnout: 32.65%

=== 2010 by-election ===
On 6 May 2010, a by-election was held following the resignation of Labour councillor Stephen Purcell. The by-election was won by Labour's Christopher Hughes.

Drumchapel/Anniesland by-election (6 May 2010) - 1 seat
Party	Candidate	FPv%	Count
Party	Candidate	FPv%	1
Labour	Christopher Hughes	56.3	5,710
SNP	Frank Rankin	21.7	2,197
Liberal Democrats	Paul McGarry	11.3	1,143
Conservative	Richard Alan Sullivan	7.0	710
Green	Larry Butler	3.7	375
Electorate: 19,951 Valid: 10,030 Spoilt: 239 Quota: 5,016 Turnout: 10,269 (51.47%)

=== 2009 by-election ===
On 4 June 2009, a by-election was held following the resignation of SNP MSP Bill Kidd as councillor. The by-election was won by Labour's Anne McTaggart.

Drumchapel/Anniesland by-election (4 June 2009) - 1 seat
Party	Candidate	FPv%	Count				
Party	Candidate	FPv%	1	2	3	4	5
Labour	Anne McTaggart	48.4	2,584	2,593	2,613	2,651	2,689
SNP	Martin J Docherty	28.3	1,509	1,530	1,573	1,651	1,698
Liberal Democrats	Nathalie McKee	6.5	349	362	373	443	532
Conservative	Richard Alan Sullivan	5.9	316	327	359	366	
Green	Eileen Duke	5.1	270	284	295		
BNP	John Robertson	3.3	177	186			
Independent	James Trolland	2.4	129				
Electorate: 20,141 Valid: 5,334 Spoilt: 84 Quota: 2,667 Turnout: 5,418 (26.9%)

=== 2007 Election ===
2007 Glasgow City Council election

2007 Council election:Drumchapel/Anniesland
Party	Candidate	FPv%	Count						
Party	Candidate	FPv%	1	2	3	4	5	6	7
Labour	Paul Carey (Note: Outgoing councillor for Summerhill single-member ward.)	26.31	2,284						
SNP	Bill Kidd	21.53	1,869						
Labour	Steven Purcell (Note: Outgoing councillor for Blairdardie single-member ward.)	21.38	1,856						
Labour	Jonathan Findlay (Note: Outgoing councillor for Anniesland single-member ward.)	12.70	1,102	1,374	1,385	1,445	1,455	1,476	1,524
Conservative	Susan McCourt	4.75	412	419	425	428	517	520	535
Liberal Democrats	Alan Lee	4.02	349	364	379	385	400	415	454
Green	Eileen Margaret Cartner Duke	3.00	260	283	300	305	319	361	428
Solidarity	Esther Nixon	2.57	223	243	259	263	267	321	
Scottish Socialist	Mike Dyer	1.71	148	175	186	191	197		
Scottish Unionist	Bobby Howie	2.04	177	184	188	190			
Electorate: 20,398 Valid: 8,680 Spoilt: 214 Quota: 1,737 Turnout: 43.60%

== See also ==
- Wards of Glasgow
