= Joseph Andrew Mclean =

Scottish filmmaker

Joseph Andrew McLean
- Born: 30 November 1979 (age 46); Glasgow, Scotland
- Education: St. Thomas Aquinas Secondary School, Glasgow
- Alma mater: University of Glasgow and University of California
- Occupation: Producer
- Years active: 2011–present
- Website: https://www.josephandrewmclean.com and https://www.partickularfilms.com

Joseph Andrew McLean (born 30 November 1979) is a Scottish film and TV producer. He has produced over 60 episodes of the TV drama River City for BBC Studios He has also produced commercials, documentaries, music videos and short films in the UK and USA.

He founded the Glasgow-based production company Partickular Films and is also the founder of Partick Film Festival.

== Early life and education ==
McLean was born in Glasgow, Scotland, the son of Anne (née Wason), and Alistair McLean. He has three older siblings Alyson, James and Lynn.

He attended St. Peter's Primary in Partick and St. Thomas Aquinas Secondary School in Jordanhill.

Born on St. Andrew's Day, he is named after Scotland's Patron Saint.

He had a love of film from a young age and was an avid cinema goer, frequenting the local Grosvenor Cinema in Ashton Lane and the Salon Cinema in Hillhead.

In 2013 he graduated from the University of Glasgow with a Master of Arts (Scotland) in English Literature and Politics.

Joseph studied screenwriting at the University of California and University of Strathclyde.

== Career ==
McLean made a number of short films during his time at the University of California and University of Glasgow.

His first feature film script Utopia, loosely based on the events surrounding Jim Jones, the founder and leader of the Peoples Temple, best known for the mass murder-suicide in November 1978 of 909 of its members in Jonestown, Guyana was voted runner-up at the 20th Anniversary University of California, Irvine Screenwriting Festival in 2012.

After leaving university, McLean founded his own production company Partickular Films which specialises in commercials, documentaries, films and music videos.

In 2013, he released the short film Sectarian Secret Police about a Partick Thistle supporter who is kidnaped by a special police unit who demand he disowns his favourite football team in favour of Rangers or Celtic. The film screened at numerous film festivals throughout the UK, including Screentest: The National Student Film Festival in London and the Loch Ness film festival.

In the same year he also directed the music video Nothing on Earth for the band Casual Sex, the music video was showcased by SXSW and featured in The Daily Record and The Skinny.

In 2014, McLean wrote a pilot for a TV series called 2014 which revolved around the organisers for the 2014 Commonwealth Games.

McLean was commissioned to write a script for an animated film as part of Deep Roots, Kilmarnock's major Homecoming Scotland event in 2014, charting the history of Dean Castle and the Boyd family, who were lords of Kilmarnock for over 400 years. The 10-minute animation was screened onto the side of the castle to an audience of over 1400 local school children.

His short film Nomad about the Scottish Independence Referendum was inspired by a scene from The Parallax View starring Warren Beatty. The film was screened at the Shorts on Tap Beyond Scotland event at 93 Feet East, Brick Lane, London.

McLean's short film Car Sick (2023) has screened at festivals in the UK, USA, Canada, Australia and Ireland.

He is a member of BAFTA Scotland.

== Filmography ==
=== Film ===
Film	Year	Director	Role	Project
Behind The Lines	1997	Gillies MacKinnon	Actor	Feature Film
The Perils of Smoking	2011		Actor	Short Film
The Decoy Bride	2011	Sheree Folkson	Actor	Feature Film
First Impressions	2011	Joseph Andrew Mclean	Producer / Director	Short Film
Mausam	2011	Pankaj Kapur	Actor	Feature Film
The Cookie Monster (USA)	2012	Joseph Andrew Mclean	Producer / Director	Short Film
Utopia: The Temple of Paradise (USA)	2012	Joseph Andrew Mclean	Producer / Director	Short Film
Sectarian Secret Police	2013	Joseph Andrew Mclean	Producer / Director	Short Film
Loch Fyne	2014	Joseph Andrew Mclean	Producer / Director	Documentary
Locavore: Pigs in the Park	2014	Joseph Andrew Mclean	Producer / Director	Documentary
Deep Roots	2014		Screenwriter	Animated Film
Nomad	2014	Joseph Andrew Mclean	Producer / Director	Short Film
Glasgow Fish Market	2014	Joseph Andrew Mclean	Producer / Director	Documentary
Cows, Cash & Cover-ups: Investigating vCJD	2017	Joseph Andrew Mclean	Producer / Director	Documentary
Outlaw King	2018	David Mackenzie	Assistant to Executive Producer	Feature Film
Slingshot	2018	Robin Haig	Associate Producer	Short Film
Get Duked!	2019	Ninian Doff	Associate Producer	Feature Film
Our Ladies	2019	Michael Caton-Jones	Assistant to Director	Feature Film
The Small Hand	2019	Justin Molotnikov	Production Coordinator	TV Film
Then Came You	2019	Adriana Trigiani	Production Assistant	Feature Film
Zebra Girl	2021	Stephanie Zari	Production Coordinator	Feature Film
Go Home	2021	Razan Madhoon	Associate Producer	Short Film
Unders	2021	Bert Dijkstra	Associate Producer	Short Film
Car Sick	2023	David Hayman Jr	Producer	Short Film

=== Television ===
TV Show	Year	Director	Role	Project
Take The High Road	1996		Actor	STV
River City	2011		Actor	BBC Studios
2014	2014	Joseph Andrew Mclean	Producer / Director	Partickular Films
Not Safe for Work	2014		Production Assistant	Channel 4
Lovesick	2014		Production Assistant	Channel 4
CNN	2016		Producer	CNN
Antiques Road Trip	2017		Researcher	STV
The People's History Show	2017		Researcher	STV
Succession	2019		Production Assistant	HBO
The Nest (British TV series)	2020		Production Assistant	BBC Scotland
River City	2019–2021		Production Management	BBC Studios
River City	2021–2024		Producer	BBC Studios
