= Bill Butler (politician) =

Scottish politician (born 1956)

Councillor Bill Butler
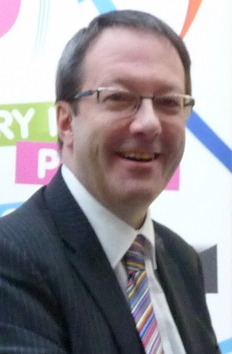

Member of Glasgow City Council
- Incumbent
- Assumed office 4 May 2017
- Constituency: Garscadden/Scotstounhill
- In office 3 May 2012 – 4 May 2017
- Preceded by: Alex Glass
- Succeeded by: Saqib Ahmed
- Constituency: Greater Pollok

Member of the Scottish Parliament for Glasgow Anniesland
- In office 23 November 2000 – 22 March 2011
- Preceded by: Donald Dewar
- Succeeded by: Bill Kidd

Personal details
- Born: 30 March 1956 (age 70) Glasgow, Scotland
- Party: Labour Co-operative
- Spouse: Patricia Ferguson
- Education: University of Stirling
- Occupation: Teacher (English)

Bill Butler (born 30 March 1956 in Glasgow) is a Scottish Labour Co-operative Councillor. He was the Member of the Scottish Parliament (MSP) for Glasgow Anniesland from a by-election in 2000 (following the death of the incumbent, First Minister Donald Dewar) until losing his seat in the 2011 election.

Butler is also a committed member of CND and has voted against the party in matters concerning nuclear weapons.

== Early life and career ==
Born in Glasgow, Butler graduated from the University of Stirling and Notre Dame College of Education in Bearsden. He taught at a number of schools in Renfrewshire and in Rutherglen, including Stonelaw High School, from 1980 to 2000.

== Reform of damages legislation ==
In June 2010, Butler launched a Member's Bill in the Scottish Parliament to reform the law on damages for wrongful death, which was successful, being passed by the Parliament on 3 March 2011 with unanimous support. The Bill was based on recommendations from the Scottish Law Commission intended to bring about fairer levels of compensation for victims of wrongful death cases (e.g. industrial accidents and disease) and their loved ones. The reforms will also mean less cases needing to go to court, which in some cases will eliminate the need for details of victims' lives to be the subject of courtroom wrangling and in all cases will mean that compensation will be paid out more speedily.

== Parliamentary activity ==
Previously, Butler sought backing in the Scottish Parliament for a bill to make Scottish health boards part-elected. His efforts won the backing of the Health Committee and Health Minister at the time, Andy Kerr, agreed to allow the scheme to be piloted.

In August 2008 he declared himself a candidate for the Deputy Leadership of the Labour Party in the Scottish Parliament, but was not elected.

After losing his Holyrood seat, he was selected as a Labour candidate for the Greater Pollok ward in the Glasgow City Council elections in 2012 and topped the poll with 2,462 first preferences. In 2017 he stood for the Garscadden/Scotstounhill ward and again was elected as the leading candidate.

== Anti-sectarianism ==
Butler has been at the forefront of the campaign to tackle sectarianism in Scotland. In June 2009 he persuaded Alex Salmond to bring before the Scottish Parliament a new strategy to tackle sectarianism.

== Personal life ==
Butler is married to Patricia Ferguson, a former Labour MSP and former Minister for Tourism, Culture and Sport, who currently serves as MP in the House of Commons.

Scottish Parliament
Preceded by Donald Dewar	Member of the Scottish Parliament for Glasgow Anniesland; 2000–2011	Succeeded by Bill Kidd
