= Gordon Matheson =

British politician

Councillor Gordon Matheson CBE

Leader of Glasgow City Council
- In office May 2010 – 10 September 2015
- Preceded by: Jim Coleman (interim)
- Succeeded by: Frank McAveety

Personal details
- Party: Scottish Labour Party
- Domestic partner: Stephen Wallace
- Education: University of Glasgow; University of Strathclyde

Gordon Matheson CBE is a former Scottish Labour Party politician and a former leader of Glasgow City Council.

== Career ==
Educated at Glasgow and Strathclyde universities, he was first elected to the city council in 1999. Re-elected in 2003, 2007 and 2012, he represented the Anderston/City ward. He served as Bailie, Justice of the Peace, Executive Member for Education and City Treasurer, before being elected leader in May 2010.

In the May 2012 local government elections, he led the Scottish Labour Party to victory, increasing the share of the vote by 3.4% and securing an overall majority in Glasgow. This was despite predictions that Labour would lose control of Glasgow to the SNP.

As leader, led Glasgow during the acclaimed 2014 Commonwealth Games, has established the Commonwealth Jobs and Graduate Funds; committed Glasgow to bid for the 2018 Summer Youth Olympics; signed Scotland's first City Deal; approved a scheme to reduce Glasgow's landfill by 90%; introduced winter fuel payments to pensioners; and embarked on the refurbishment or rebuild of every school in the city. In November 2012, and again in 2014, Matheson was named Local Politician of the Year at The Herald's Scottish Politician of the Year Awards.

Matheson was appointed Commander of the Order of the British Empire (CBE) in the 2015 New Year Honours for services to local government and the community.

In June 2015, Matheson announced he would stand in the 2015 Scottish Labour Party deputy leadership election, following a rule change allowing councillors to stand for the position, although he was unsuccessful. After losing the deputy leadership election in August 2015, he announced that he would stand down as leader of Glasgow City Council. Matheson has subsequently taken up a position as a visiting professor at the University of Strathclyde's Institute for Future Cities – part of its economics department.

== Honors and awards ==
2015 – CBE – Commander of the Order of the British Empire from HM The Queen for services to local government and the community

2014 – Scottish Local Politician of the Year from The Herald

2012 – Scottish Local Politician of the Year from The Herald

2004 – Fellow (FRSA) from Royal Society of Arts

== Personal life ==
Matheson is gay, and lives in Glasgow with his partner, Stephen Wallace.

Preceded by Steven Purcell	Leader of Glasgow City Council; 2010–2015	Succeeded by Frank McAveety
