= Politics of Glasgow =

Politics of city in Scotland

The politics of Glasgow, Scotland's largest city by population, are expressed in the deliberations and decisions of Glasgow City Council, in elections to the council, the Scottish Parliament and the UK Parliament.

For additional non-official politics see Crime in Scotland and Gangs in the United Kingdom.

== Local government ==
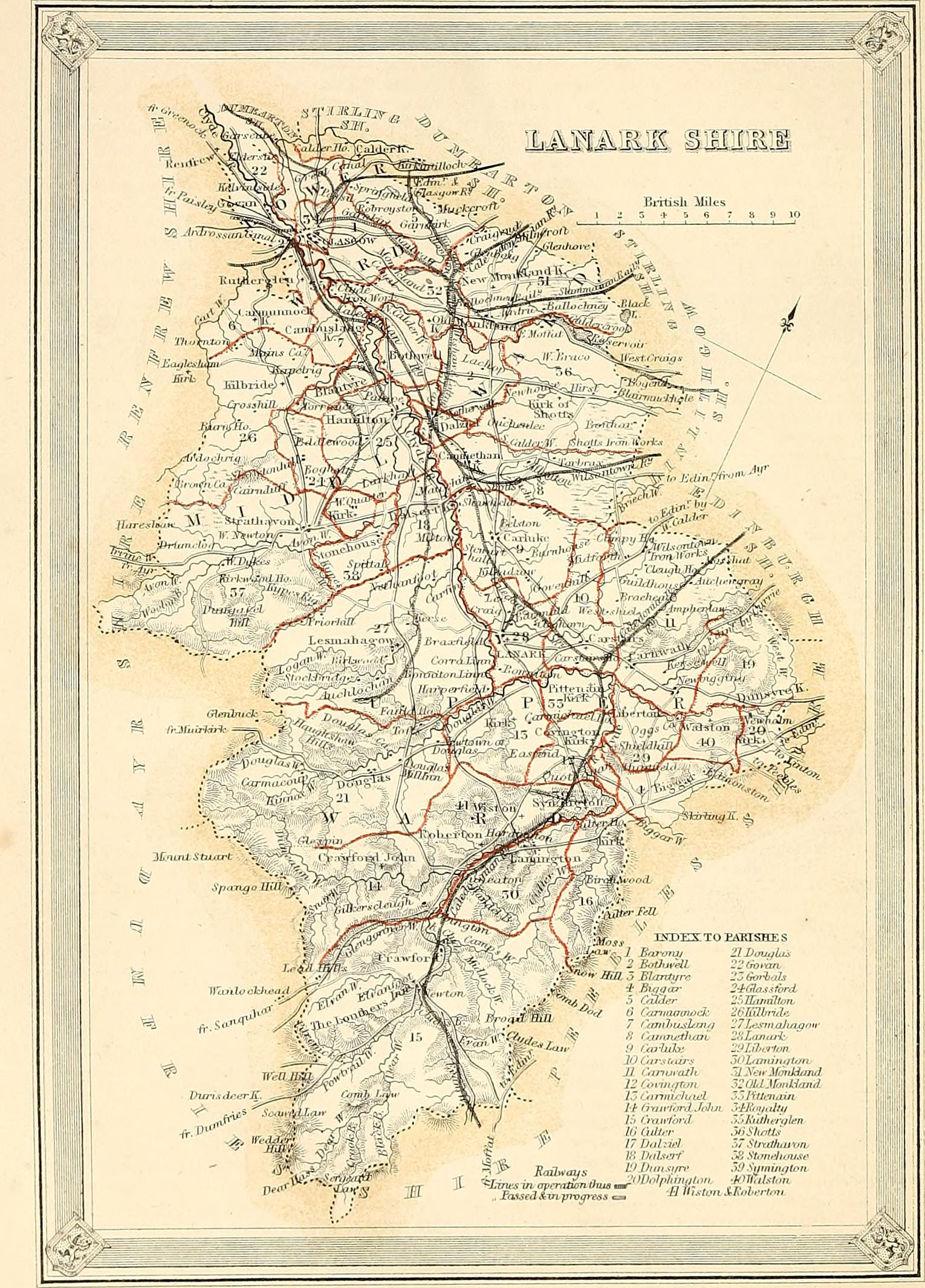
1868 map of Lanarkshire – Glasgow (top left) comprises its 'lower ward'

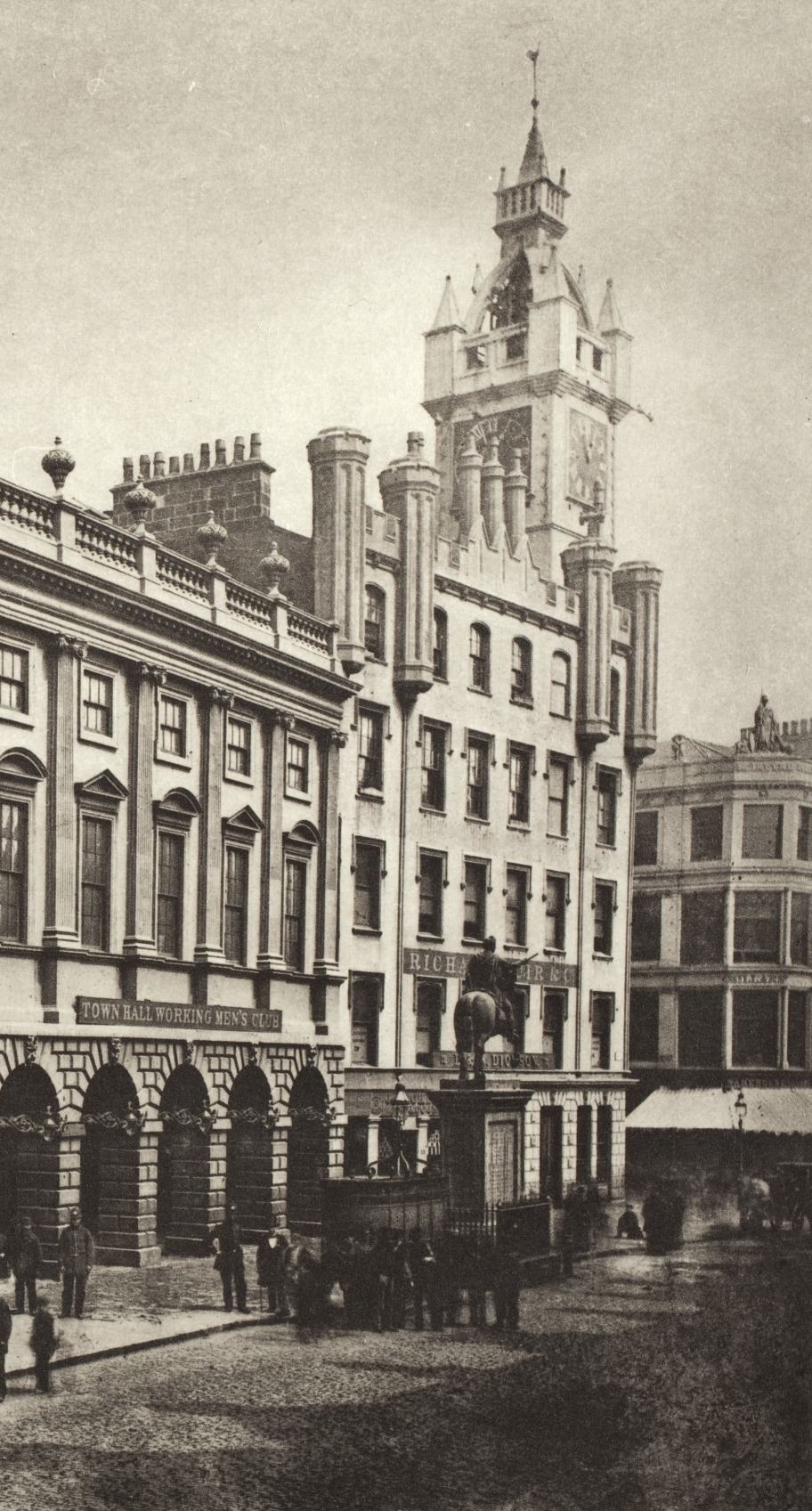
Glasgow Tolbooth at Glasgow Cross (photographed 1868)

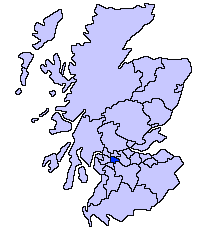
Glasgow City Council area (1996) shown alongside the other local authority areas within Scotland

As one of the 32 unitary local government areas of Scotland, Glasgow City Council has a defined structure of governance, generally under the Local Government etc. (Scotland) Act 1994, controlling matters of local administration such as housing, planning, local transport, parks and local economic development and regeneration. For such purposes the city is currently (as of 2020, since 2017) divided into 23 wards, each returning either three or four councillors via single transferable vote, a proportional representation system. From 1995 until 2007, single members were elected from 79 small wards.

Among other appointments, one of the councillors becomes its leader, and one other takes on the ceremonial and ambassadorial role of Lord Provost of Glasgow, an office which dates from the 1450s. The city council sits at the Glasgow City Chambers on George Square, built in the 1880s and one of the city landmarks.

A Glasgow Town Council operated under the historic county of Lanarkshire, with Glasgow serving as the capital of its 'lower ward'; it was originally based at the Glasgow Tolbooth at Glasgow Cross. In 1893, by now one of the most important cities in the British Empire after decades of continuous growth, wealth creation through trade and industrialisation fuelled by the extraction of natural resources in the surrounding area, it was then made a 'county of a city' (alongside Aberdeen, Dundee and Edinburgh) and effectively controlled its own affairs under Glasgow Corporation, a body that oversaw further immigration and growth as incomers sought work in its strong industrial sectors including locomotives, textiles and particularly shipbuilding on the River Clyde. A municipal public transport system was developed and an abundance of civic amenities were established, but the city's urban fabric struggled to cope with the number of people living in it, and slum housing conditions developed in several areas. During World War I, the council was unique in the United Kingdom in appointing an official war artist, Frederick Farrell.

This situation continued through much of the 20th century, during which time Glasgow's boundaries were extended several times, involving the incorporation of nearby burghs such as Govan, Maryhill, Partick, Pollokshaws, Pollokshields, Shettleston and Springburn, and its population exceeded 1 million, only to fall back below that due to the subsequent construction of 'new towns' outwith its boundaries to replace sub-standard housing (much of it dating from the previous century) and an economic downturn which prompted thousands to emigrate overseas to countries such as Canada, the United States, New Zealand, South Africa and Australia. In this era, the corporation oversaw the building of many peripheral housing estates and tower blocks as another solution to the city's accommodation crisis, as well as the installation of the M8 motorway through the heart of its urban area, part of an even more elaborate network which was never fully completed. Glasgow Corporation Transport was under the control of the Glasgow Corporation, and ran the local buses and Glasgow Trams, until it was superseded by the Greater Glasgow Passenger Transport Executive (now Strathclyde Partnership for Transport) on 1 June 1973.

The enactment of the Local Government (Scotland) Act 1973 led to the historic counties being abolished, and Glasgow became a second-tier district within the Strathclyde Region, and also serving as the capital of Strathclyde which contained more than half of Scotland's population. During the period of two tier local government (Local Government (Scotland) Act 1973) from 1975 to 1996, Glasgow District Council was responsible for refuse collection, museums, libraries and housing, while Strathclyde Regional Council had responsibilities for policing, fire service, water, education, social work and transport.

The City of Glasgow became a unitary council area in 1996 under the Local Government etc. (Scotland) Act 1994, taking on the powers and responsibilities previously divided between councils of the Glasgow City district and the Strathclyde region. Glasgow City Council serves a population of roughly 600,000 with the boundaries of the post-1975 district largely retained, but with many of its affluent suburbs that had been within Strathclyde – whose residents used Glasgow services regularly – outwith the city auspices for the collection of council tax.

=== Selected local government election maps ===
1896 (First Glasgow Corporation election, 25 wards / 75 councillors)

1933 (37 wards / 116 councillors, Labour gain control from Moderates)

1984 (Glasgow District Council, 66 wards and councillors, area including additions in the south and east)

1999 (79 wards and councillors, Rutherglen and Cambuslang no longer present)

2017 (23 wards / 85 councillors, largest party SNP)

=== History of leaders and administrations ===
Controlling party	Years	Leader
No overall control	1934–1945	1933–1934: George Smith (Labour)
No overall control	1934–1945	1934–1938: Patrick Dollan (Labour)
No overall control	1934–1945	1938–1941: Hector McNeill (Labour)
No overall control	1934–1945	1941–1948: George Smith (Labour)
Labour	1945–1949	1941–1948: George Smith (Labour)
Labour	1945–1949	1948–1949: Andrew Hood (Labour)
No overall control	1949–1950	1949–1952: John Donald Kelly (Progressive)
Progressives	1950–1952	1949–1952: John Donald Kelly (Progressive)
Labour	1952–1968	1952–1955: Andrew Hood (Labour)
Labour	1952–1968	1955–1957: Jean Roberts (Labour)
Labour	1952–1968	1957–1958: Myer Galpern (Labour)
Labour	1952–1968	1958–1963: Peter Meldrum (Labour)
Labour	1952–1968	1963–1968: William Taylor (Labour)
No overall control	1968–1969	1968–1969: John Douglas Glen (Progressive)
Progressives	1969–1970	1969–1971: Peter Gemmill (Progressive)
No overall control	1970–1971	1969–1971: Peter Gemmill (Progressive)
Labour	1971–1977	1971–1972: John Mains (Labour)
Labour	1971–1977	1972–1973: Richard Dynes (Labour)
Labour	1971–1977	1973–1974: Geoff Shaw (Labour)
Labour	1971–1977	1974–1977: Richard Dynes (Labour)
No overall control	1977–1980	1977–1979: John Young (Conservative)
No overall control	1977–1980	1979–1986: Jean McFadden (Labour)
Labour	1980–2017	1979–1986: Jean McFadden (Labour)
Labour	1980–2017	1986–1992: Pat Lally (Labour)
Labour	1980–2017	1992–1994: Jean McFadden (Labour)
Labour	1980–2017	1994–1996: Pat Lally (Labour)
Labour	1980–2017	1996–1997: Bob Gould (Labour)
Labour	1980–2017	1997–1999: Frank McAveety (Labour)
Labour	1980–2017	1999–2005: Charlie Gordon (Labour)
Labour	1980–2017	2005–2010: Steven Purcell (Labour)
Labour	1980–2017	2010–2015: Gordon Matheson (Labour)
Labour	1980–2017	2015–2017: Frank McAveety (Labour)
No overall control	2017–present	2017–present: Susan Aitken (SNP)

== Holyrood ==
The next tier of government is that of the Scottish Parliament, which legislates on matters of Scottish "national interest", such as healthcare, education, the environment and agriculture, devolved to it by the Parliament of the United Kingdom. For elections to the Scottish Parliament (which was established in 1999 and sits at the Scottish Parliament Building in the Edinburgh), the city area is currently (as of 2020, since 2011) divided among eight Scottish Parliament constituencies, each returning one Member of the Scottish Parliament (MSP) via the first-past-the-post system, and forms 88% of the Glasgow region which returns another seven 'list' members by proportional representation.

Three former First Ministers of Scotland, Donald Dewar, Nicola Sturgeon and Humza Yousaf represented seats in Glasgow. Dewar served as MSP for Glasgow Anniesland from 1999 until his death in 2000. Sturgeon served as a Glasgow List MSP from 1999 to 2007, the constituency MSP for Glasgow Govan from 2007 to 2011, and Glasgow Southside from 2011 to 2026. Similarly, Yousaf served as a Glasgow List MSP from 2011 to 2016, and as MSP for Glasgow Pollok until 2026.

== Westminster ==
The Parliament of the United Kingdom (located at the Palace of Westminster in London) legislates on matters such as taxation, foreign policy, defence, employment and trade. For elections to the House of Commons of this parliament, the city area is currently (as of 2020, since 2005) divided among seven United Kingdom Parliamentary constituencies, with each returning one Member of Parliament (MP) by the first-past-the-post system of election.

Glasgow has returned at least two MPs to Westminster since the creation of the first Glasgow constituency in 1832, despite the suppression of the 'Radical War' a decade or so earlier. The town, by then already the largest in Scotland with 200,000 residents, was split off from the Clyde Burghs constituency, which itself had been created from a merger of four Parliament of Scotland seats, one of which was Glasgow, established in 1630. The initial Westminster seat was divided into seven constituencies in the Redistribution of Seats Act 1885. Some Glasgow women played a prominent role in the struggles for Women's suffrage in Scotland.

The rise in the labour movement in the early-twentieth century and the social composition of industrial Glasgow at the time led to its politics being dubbed the Red Clydeside. Notable protests included rent strikes over sub-standard housing led by the Glasgow Women's Housing Association, and a post-World War I city centre rally led by the trade unions which led to rioting, known as the Battle of George Square, to which the Sheriff of Lanarkshire responded by calling for military aid. 18,000 Glasgow men had died in the conflict, from a total of 200,000 who enlisted. In the 1930s, hundreds of left-wing Glaswegians volunteered to join the International Brigades to assist the Republican faction in the Spanish Civil War, with 65 being killed in the conflict.

== Other elections ==
Glasgow's results in the 2014 Scottish Independence Referendum by Scottish Parliamentary constituency

- The city was represented in the European Parliament under the Glasgow constituency from 1979 until the 1999 elections, when proportional representation was used under a single multi-member Scotland constituency.
- On 11 September 1997, Glasgow Voted "Yes/Yes" in the Scottish devolution referendum by 83.6%/75.0% to 16.4%/25.0% with a 51.6% turnout.
- On 18 September 2014, Glasgow voted "Yes" in the Scottish Independence Referendum by 53.5% to 46.5% with a 75.0% turnout rate. Each of the city's Scottish Parliamentary constituencies voted Yes, in marked contrast to the results in Edinburgh where every constituency voted No.
- On 23 June 2016, Glasgow voted "Remain" in the UK referendum on EU membership by 66.6% to 33.4% with a 56.2% turnout rate.
- Results of previous votes on similar subjects (1975 UK in ECC and 1979 Scottish devolution) were collected on a regional basis – Glasgow was within Strathclyde region at the time.

== See also ==
- Politics of Aberdeen
- Politics of Dundee
- Politics of Edinburgh
- Politics of Scotland
- Politics of the Highland council area
- Timeline of Glasgow history
