= Glasgow Anniesland (Scottish Parliament constituency) =

Scottish Parliament constituency

- Burgh constituency for the Scottish Parliament
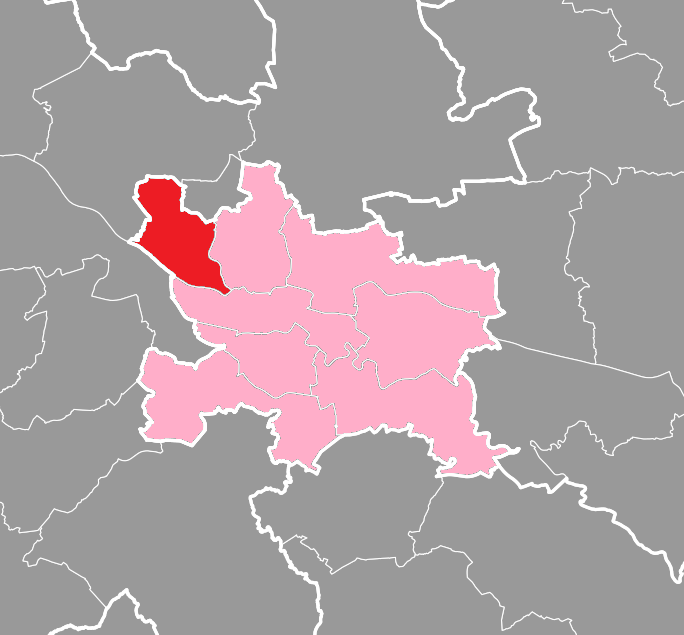

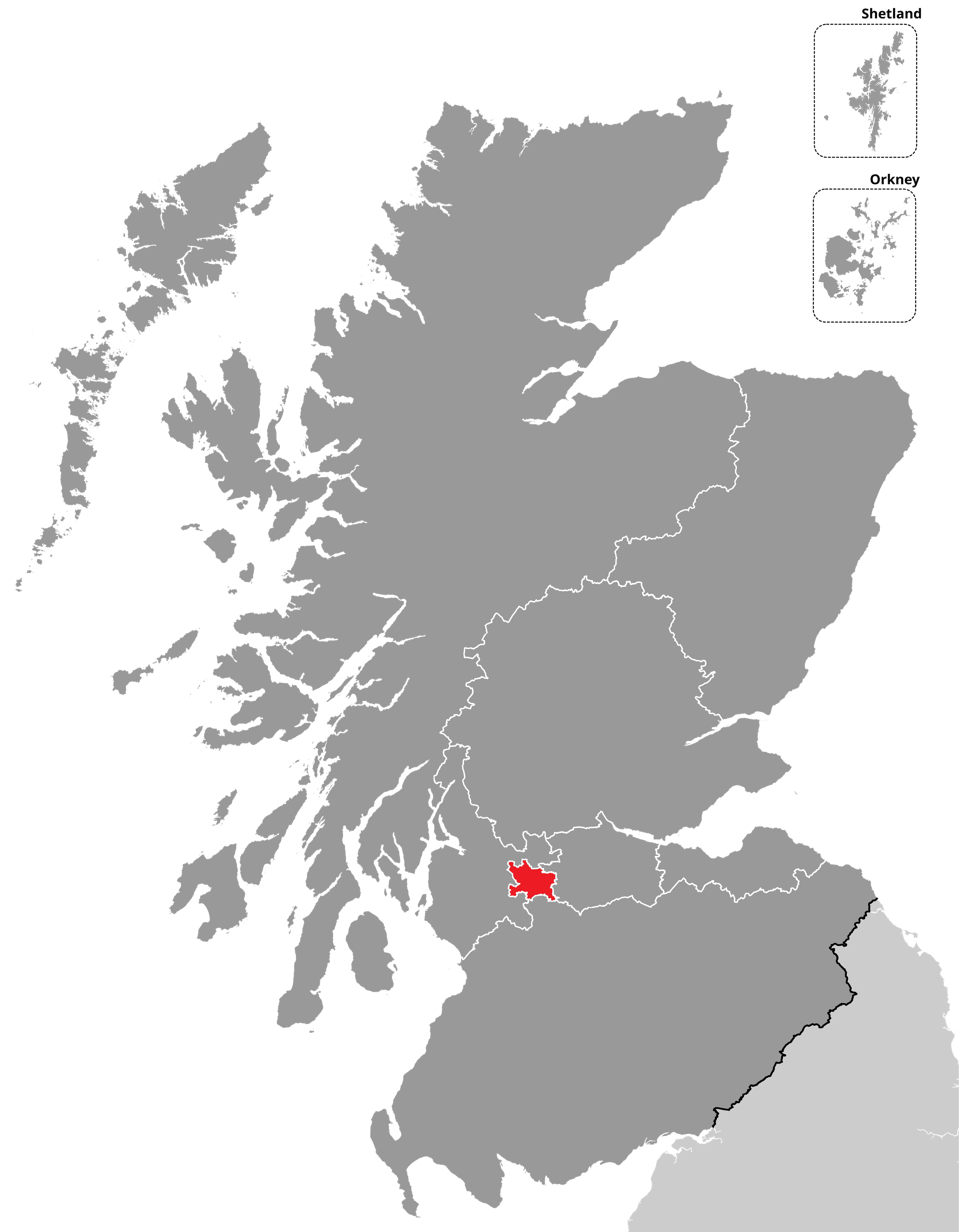
- Glasgow Anniesland shown within the Glasgow electoral region and the region shown within Scotland
- Electoral region: Glasgow
- Electorate: 60,441 (2026)

Current constituency
- Created: 1999
- Party: Scottish National Party
- MSP: Colm Merrick
- Council area: Glasgow City

Glasgow Anniesland (Gaelic: Glaschu Fearann Anna) is a burgh constituency of the Scottish Parliament, being one of eight constituencies covering the Glasgow City council area. It elects one Member of the Scottish Parliament (MSP) by the plurality (first past the post) method of election. Under the additional-member electoral system used for elections to the Scottish Parliament, it is also one of eight constituencies in the Glasgow electoral region, which elects seven additional members, in addition to eight constituency MSPs, to produce a form of proportional representation for the region as a whole.

In the first election to the Scottish Parliament the seat was won for Labour by Donald Dewar who subsequently became the first First Minister of Scotland. From 2011 the MSP was Bill Kidd of the Scottish National Party, who was succeeded in the 2026 Scottish Parliament election by Colm Merrick.

== Electoral region ==
The other seven constituencies of the Glasgow region are Glasgow Baillieston and Shettleston, Glasgow Cathcart and Pollok, Glasgow Central, Glasgow Easterhouse and Springburn, Glasgow Kelvin and Maryhill, Glasgow Southside, and Rutherglen and Cambuslang. The region covers most of the Glasgow City council area, and a north-western portion of the South Lanarkshire council area.

Prior to the second periodic review of Scottish Parliament boundaries in 2025, the other eight constituencies of the Glasgow region were Glasgow Cathcart, Glasgow Kelvin, Glasgow Maryhill and Springburn, Glasgow Pollok, Glasgow Provan, Glasgow Shettleston, Glasgow Southside, and Rutherglen. The region covered the Glasgow City council area and a north-western portion of the South Lanarkshire council area.

== Constituency boundaries ==
Map of boundaries 2011-2026

The Glasgow Anniesland constituency was created at the same time as the Scottish Parliament, in 1999, with the name and boundaries of an existing Westminster constituency. In 2005, however, Scottish Westminster (House of Commons) constituencies were mostly replaced with new constituencies. Following the second periodic review of Scottish Parliament boundaries, there are now eight constituencies covering the Glasgow City council area: Glasgow Anniesland, Glasgow Baillieston and Shettleston, Glasgow Cathcart and Pollok, Glasgow Central, Glasgow Easterhouse and Springburn, Glasgow Kelvin and Maryhill, Glasgow Southside, and Renfrewshire North and Cardonald (the latter also covering part of the Renfrewshire council area).

=== Boundary reviews ===
Following their first periodic review of Scottish Parliament boundaries the Boundary Commission for Scotland recommended alterations to the existing Glasgow Anniesland constituency boundaries, which were in use from the 2011 Scottish Parliament election. The electoral wards used to defined the Glasgow Anniesland were:

- In full: Garscadden/Scotstounhill, Drumchapel/Anniesland
- In part: Partick West (shared with neighbouring Glasgow Kelvin)

At the second periodic review of Scottish Parliament boundaries further changes were recommended by Boundaries Scotland, with the new boundaries set to be used for the 2026 Scottish Parliament election. The electoral wards used to defined the Glasgow Anniesland at this review are:

- Garscadden/Scotstounhill (entire ward)
- Drumchapel/Anniesland (entire ward)
- Victoria Park (entire ward)

== Member of the Scottish Parliament ==
Election	Member	Party
1999	Donald Dewar	Labour
2000	Bill Butler	Labour
2011	Bill Kidd	SNP
2026	Colm Merrick	SNP

== Election results ==
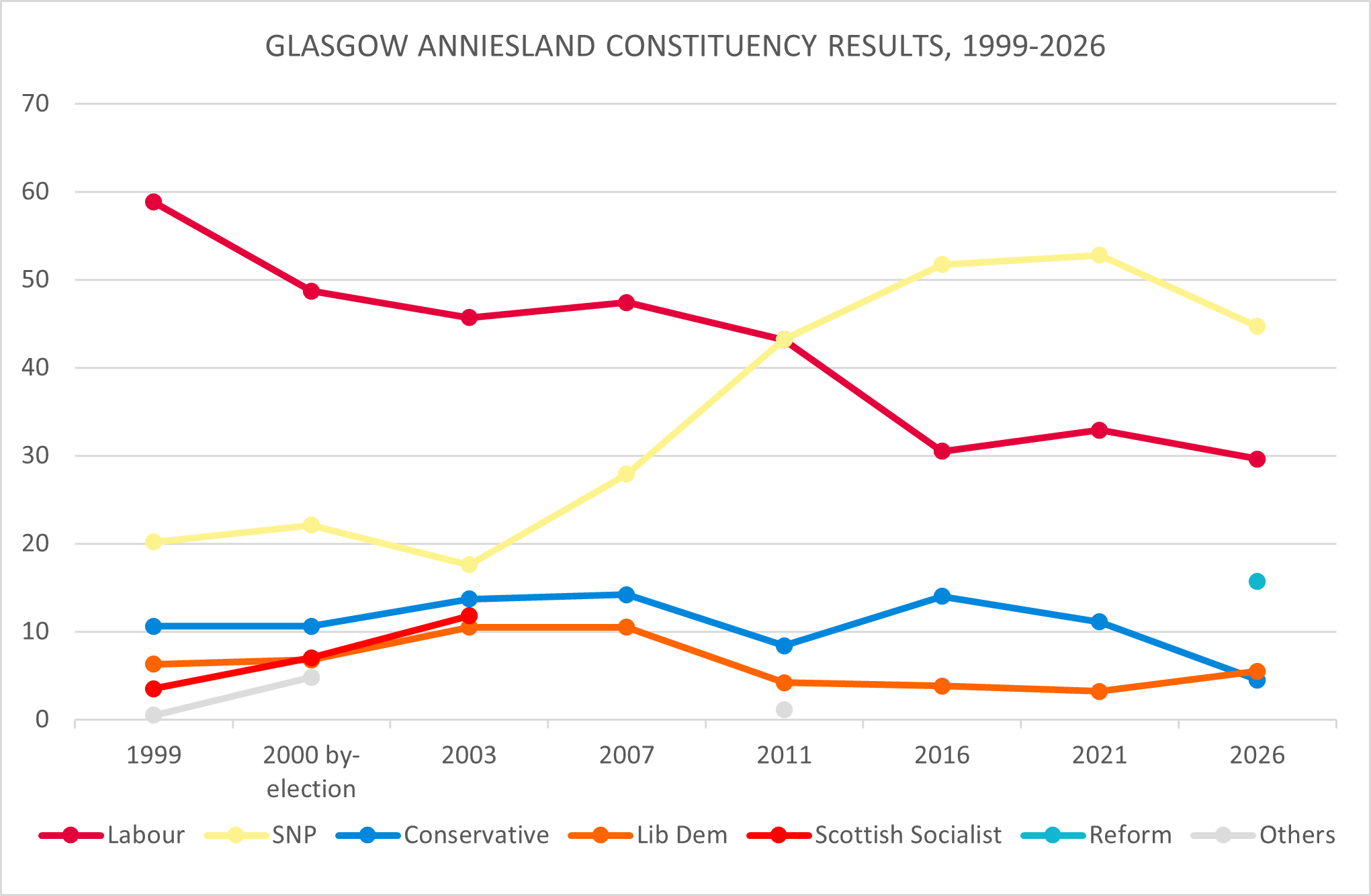
Election results since 1999 (parties who never got >5% counted as others)

=== 2020s ===
2026 Scottish Parliament election: Glasgow Anniesland (Note: Note that changes in vote share are shown with respect to the notional result of the 2021 election, calculated to account for boundary changes)
Party	Candidate	Constituency			Regional		
Party	Candidate	Votes	%	±%	Votes	%	±%
SNP	Colm Merrick	13,821	44.7	▼8.0	8,066	25.9	▼15.9
Green					6,840	22.0	▲9.5
Labour	Eunis Jassemi	9,162	29.6	▼2.0	6,469	20.8	▼2.9
Reform	Sean O'Hagan	4,839	15.7	New	4,726	15.2	▲15.0
Conservative	Sandesh Gulhane (Note: Incumbent member on the party list, or for another constituency)	1,404	4.5	▼6.3	1,565	5.0	▼8.4
Liberal Democrats	James Speirs	1,688	5.5	▲2.3	1,464	4.7	▲2.0
AtLS					413	1.3	New
Independent Green Voice					375	1.2	▲0.5
Independent	Craig Houston				298	1.0	N/A
Scottish Family					238	0.8	▲0.2
Scottish Socialist					159	0.5	New
ISP					131	0.4	New
Scottish Christian					121	0.3	New
Workers Party					87	0.3	New
Independent	Elspeth Kerr				86	0.1	N/A
Scottish Common Party					34	0.1	New
UKIP					29	0.1	Steady
Majority		4,659	15.1				
Valid votes		30,914			31,101		
Invalid votes		233			98		
Turnout		31,147	51.5	▼6.1	31,199	51.6	▼7.1
SNP hold		Swing		▼3.0			
Notes

2021 Scottish Parliament election: Glasgow Anniesland
Party	Candidate	Constituency			Regional		
Party	Candidate	Votes	%	±%	Votes	%	±%
SNP	Bill Kidd (Note: Incumbent member for this constituency)	17,501	52.8	▲1.1	13,904	41.74	▼1.3
Labour Co-op	Eva Murray (Note: Murray stood on a joint ticket on behalf of Scottish Labour and the Scottish Co-operative Party. The regional list vote was for Scottish Labour only.)	10,913	32.9	▲2.4	8,167	24.52	▲0.3
Conservative	Ade Aibinu	3,688	11.1	▼2.9	4,618	13.86	▼0.2
Green					3,691	11.08	▲1.6
Liberal Democrats	Mark Simons	1,063	3.2	▼0.6	903	2.71	▲0.1
Alba					634	1.90	New
All for Unity					280	0.84	New
Independent Green Voice					242	0.73	New
Scottish Family					218	0.65	New
Women's Equality					115	0.35	▼0.5
Freedom Alliance (UK)					103	0.31	New
Abolish the Scottish Parliament					82	0.25	New
Scottish Libertarian					62	0.19	New
Reform					61	0.18	New
Communist					52	0.16	New
TUSC					47	0.14	New
UKIP					40	0.12	▼1.7
Independent	Craig Ross				27	0.08	New
SDP					19	0.06	New
Independent	Daniel Donaldson				16	0.05	New
Renew					16	0.05	New
Reclaim					15	0.05	New
Majority		6,588	19.9	▼1.3			
Valid votes		33,165			33,312		
Invalid votes		218			106		
Turnout		33,383	58.6	▲8.2	33,418	58.7	▲8.2
SNP hold		Swing					

=== 2010s ===
2016 Scottish Parliament election: Glasgow Anniesland
Party	Candidate	Constituency			Regional		
Party	Candidate	Votes	%	±%	Votes	%	±%
SNP	Bill Kidd (Note: Incumbent member for this constituency)	15,007	51.7	▲8.5	12,548	43.0	▲3.3
Labour	Bill Butler	8,854	30.5	▼12.7	7,079	24.3	▼9.5
Conservative	Adam Tomkins (Note: Elected on the party list)	4,057	14.0	▲5.6	4,107	14.1	▲6.4
Green					2,778	9.5	▲3.3
Liberal Democrats	James Speirs	1,098	3.8	▼0.4	748	2.6	▼0.3
UKIP					523	1.8	▲1.4
BUP					279	1.0	New
Solidarity					265	0.9	New
Women's Equality					233	0.8	New
Scottish Christian					230	0.8	▼0.2
Animal Welfare					191	0.7	New
RISE					172	0.6	New
Independent	Andrew McCullagh				29	0.1	New
Majority		6,153	21.2	▲21.2			
Valid votes		29,016			29,182		
Invalid votes		185			58		
Turnout		29,201	50.4	▲7.0	29,240	50.5	▲7.0
SNP hold		Swing		▲10.4			
Notes

2011 Scottish Parliament election: Glasgow Anniesland
Party	Candidate	Constituency			Regional		
Party	Candidate	Votes	%	±%	Votes	%	±%
SNP	Bill Kidd (Note: Incumbent member on the party list, or for another constituency)	10,329	43.19	N/A	9,513	39.7	N/A
Labour	Bill Butler (Note: Incumbent member for this constituency)	10,322	43.16	N/A	8,109	33.8	N/A
Conservative	Matthew Smith	2,011	8.4	N/A	1,850	7.7	N/A
Green					1,489	6.2	N/A
Liberal Democrats	Paul McGarry	1,000	4.2	N/A	701	2.9	N/A
Respect					697	2.9	N/A
All-Scotland Pensioners Party					386	1.6	N/A
BNP					257	1.1	N/A
Communist	Marc Livingstone	256	1.1	N/A			
Scottish Christian					246	1.0	N/A
Scottish Socialist					223	0.9	N/A
Socialist Labour					173	0.7	N/A
Scottish Unionist					136	0.6	N/A
UKIP					91	0.4	N/A
Pirate					68	0.3	N/A
Scottish Homeland Party					23	0.1	N/A
Independent	Caroline Johnstone				27	0.1	N/A
Majority		7	0.03	N/A			
Valid votes		23,918			23,989		
Invalid votes		105			91		
Turnout		24,023	43.4	N/A	24,080	43.5	N/A
SNP win (new boundaries)							

=== 2000s ===
2007 Scottish Parliament election: Glasgow Anniesland
Party	Candidate	Votes	%	±%
Labour	Bill Butler	10,483	47.4	+1.7
SNP	Bill Kidd	6,177	27.9	+10.3
Conservative	Bill Aitken	3,154	14.2	+0.5
Liberal Democrats	Danica Gilland	2,325	10.5	±0.0
Majority		4,306	19.5	−8.6
Rejected ballots		1,766	3.6	
Turnout		22,139	45.8	+2.2
Labour hold		Swing	-4.4	

2003 Scottish Parliament election: Glasgow Anniesland
Party	Candidate	Votes	%	±%
Labour	Bill Butler	10,141	45.7	−13.1
SNP	Bill Kidd	3,186	17.6	−2.6
Conservative	William Aitken	3,032	13.7	+3.1
Scottish Socialist	Charlie McCarthy	2,620	11.8	+8.3
Liberal Democrats	Iain Brown	2,330	10.5	+4.2
Majority		6,253	28.1	−10.5
Turnout		22,165	43.6	−8.3
Labour hold		Swing		

Scottish Parliament by-election, 2000: Glasgow Anniesland
Party	Candidate	Votes	%	±%
Labour	Bill Butler	9,838	48.7	−10.1
SNP	Tom Chalmers	4,462	22.1	+1.9
Conservative	Kate Pickering	2,148	10.6	±0.0
Scottish Socialist	Rosie Kane	1,429	7.0	+3.5
Liberal Democrats	Judith Fryer	1,384	6.8	+0.5
Green	Alistair Whitelaw	662	3.3	New
Socialist Labour	Murdo Ritchie	298	1.5	+1.0
Majority		5,376	26.6	−12.0
Turnout		20,211	38.3	−13.6
Labour hold		Swing		

=== 1990s ===
1999 Scottish Parliament election: Glasgow Anniesland
Party	Candidate	Votes	%
Labour	Donald Dewar	16,749	58.8
SNP	Kaukab Stewart	5,756	20.2
Conservative	Bill Aitken	3,032	10.6
Liberal Democrats	Iain Brown	1,804	6.3
Scottish Socialist	Ann Lynch	1,000	3.5
Socialist Labour	Edward Boyd	139	0.5
Majority		10,993	38.6
Turnout		28,480	51.9
Labour win (new seat)			

== See also ==
- Politics of Glasgow
- Glasgow Anniesland (UK Parliament constituency)

New title	Constituency represented by the First Minister; 1999 – 2000	Succeeded by Fife Central
