= Bill Kidd =

Scottish National Party politician

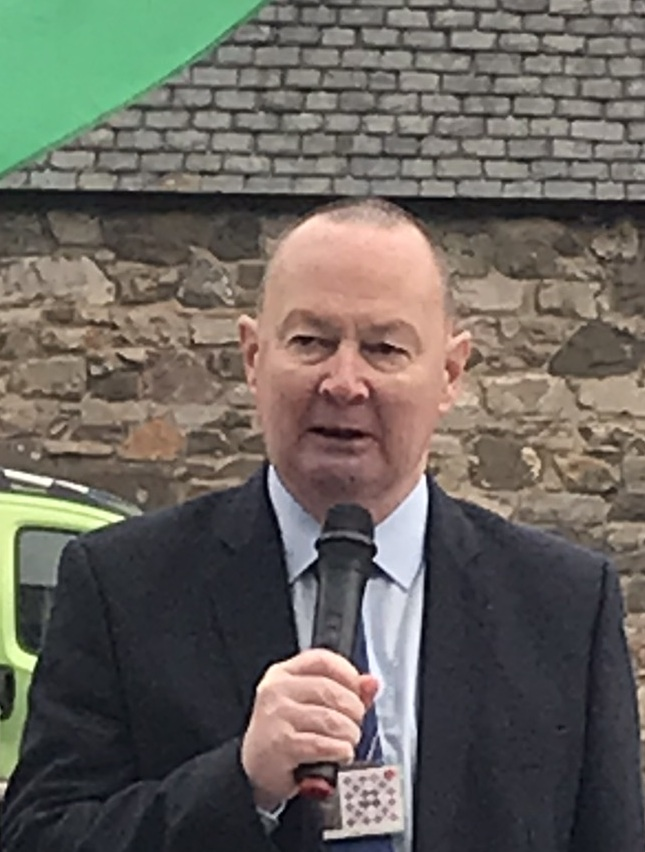
- Kidd in 2023

Member of the Scottish Parliament for Glasgow Anniesland
- In office 5 May 2011 – 9 April 2026
- Preceded by: Bill Butler
- Succeeded by: Colm Merrick

Member of the Scottish Parliament for Glasgow
- In office 3 May 2007 – 22 March 2011

Personal details
- Born: 24 July 1956 (age 69)
- Party: Scottish National Party
- Occupation: Member of the Scottish Parliament
- Profession: Politician

William Kidd (born 24 July 1956) is a Scottish National Party (SNP) politician, who served as the Member of the Scottish Parliament (MSP) for the Glasgow Anniesland constituency from 2011 to 2026, having previously represented the Glasgow region from 2007 to 2011.

He is currently the convenor of the Cross Party Group on Nuclear Disarmament and deputy convenor of the Cross Party Group on Human Trafficking. He previously served as chief whip from 2012 to 2018 and as senior deputy whip from 2007 to 2012.

Outside of Holyrood, Kidd also serves as co-president of the international organisation Parliamentarians for Nuclear Non Proliferation and Disarmament (PNND). He has represented PNND at the United Nations, including delivering PNND's address to the 10th NPT Review Conference in August 2022. In 2016 Kidd was named, in his capacity as co-president, in a nomination of PNND for the Nobel Peace Prize. He was singled out for his dedicated work campaigning against nuclear weapons.

== Early life ==
He was a clerk at the Clydebank District Council, before enrolling as a mature student. Before entering politics, Kidd also worked as a clerk at the Western Infirmary and Glasgow Dental Hospital for many years.

== Political career ==
Kidd was the SNP candidate at the 1987 general election for Glasgow Hillhead but finished in fourth place with 2,713 votes, losing to George Galloway of the Labour Party. Shortly afterwards, he left the SNP to become a founding member of the Scottish Socialist Party (unrelated to the current party of that name). He stood for the SSP at the 1989 Glasgow Central by-election, but later re-joined the SNP.

He stood again for the SNP at Cunninghame South at the 2001 general election but finished in second place with 5,194 votes to Brian Donohoe of the Labour Party. At the 2003 and 2007 Scottish Parliament elections, he was the SNP candidate for Glasgow Anniesland, finishing in second place on both occasions. In 2007, he was elected as an MSP for the Glasgow region. The following day, he was also elected as a councillor for the Drumchapel/Anniesland ward of Glasgow City Council. In 2009, he decided to concentrate on his Holyrood role and stood down as a Glasgow City councillor.

In 2011, he was elected as MSP for Glasgow Anniesland, defeating the Labour candidate by only seven votes. In the 2016 election, Kidd retained the seat, this time with a majority of 6,153 votes. He Kidd won the seat for Anniesland again in 2021, this time winning 17,501 seats ahead of second-placed Scottish Labour candidate Eva Murray's 10,932.

On 12 March 2025, he announced he would stand down at the next Scottish Parliament election.

He is a past convenor of the SNP's Glasgow Regional Association.
