= Steven Purcell =

British politician

Councillor Steven Purcell

Leader of Glasgow City Council
- In office 24 May 2005 – 2 March 2010
- Preceded by: Charlie Gordon
- Succeeded by: Gordon Matheson

Glasgow City Councillor
- In office 6 April 1995 – 5 March 2010
- Preceded by: Office established
- Succeeded by: Christopher Hughes
- Constituency: Blairdardie (1995 - 2007); Drumschapel/Anniesland (2007 - 2010)

Personal details
- Born: 1972 (age 53–54) Glasgow, Scotland
- Party: Labour

Steven Purcell is a former Scottish Labour Party politician who was councillor for the Drumchapel/Anniesland ward of Glasgow City Council. He was Leader of the council from 24 May 2005 until 2 March 2010, when he announced he would be standing down from this position due to stress. He resigned his post as councillor on 5 March 2010.

In late September 2011, Strathclyde Police's major crime unit had completed a probe into Purcell over allegations of corruption and links with gangsters during his time as Leader of Glasgow City Council and have submitted reports to the Procurator-Fiscal.

In January 2012, the Crown Office stated that there was insufficient evidence of criminality and no further action was currently appropriate.

== Personal life ==
Born in 1972 in Glasgow, Purcell has lived all of his life in the city's Yoker area. He is a keen football fan and enjoys reading, music, history and debates among many interests. In 2006, he announced that he was gay and was separating from his wife.

== Political life ==
He joined the Labour Party in 1986, and was first elected to Glasgow City Council in May 1995 for the ward of Blairdardie.

During his time at the council he had been the council's Convener of Development & Regeneration Services and Convener of Education and later leader of the council.

== Commonwealth Games ==
Purcell played a part in bringing the 2014 Commonwealth Games to Glasgow, and was part of the Bid Team that mustered support for the games. On 9 November 2007 in Sri Lanka it was announced that Glasgow had won the games.

== Resignation ==
On 2 March 2010, it was announced that Purcell was resigning as Leader of Glasgow City Council due to stress. It was revealed on 3 March 2010 that Purcell had been admitted to Castle Craig Hospital, a "drug and alcohol addictions hospital" in the Scottish Borders on Saturday, 27 February 2010.

It was later announced that he went missing from the hospital on Sunday, 28 February, with Lothian and Borders Police being called to find him, before returning on his own later that day. He left the hospital on 2 March 2010.

On 4 March 2010, The Scotsman newspaper alleged that Glasgow City Council's press relations staff were preparing a press-release that stated Purcell's resignation was due to a "chemical dependency", but were stopped from doing so by lawyers representing Purcell who later put out the press release citing "stress and exhaustion" as his reasons for resigning.

A further press release by his lawyers was put out denying this, stating that according to Mr. Purcell's psychiatrist, Dr. Florian Kaplick, "it needs to be noted that he was not treated for 'a drug problem'".

On 5 March 2010, he stood down as councillor.

Preceded by Charlie Gordon	Leader of Glasgow City Council; 2005–2010	Succeeded by Gordon Matheson
