= 2017 Glasgow City Council election =

2017 Scottish local government election

- 4 May 2017

All 85 seats to Glasgow City Council 43 seats needed for a majority
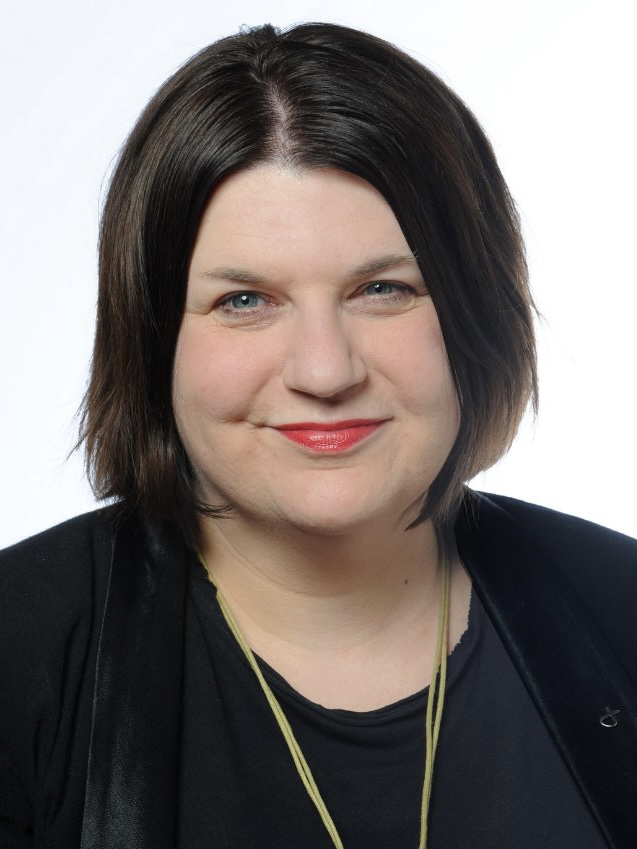

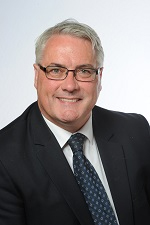

	First party	Second party	Third party
Leader	Susan Aitken	Frank McAveety	David Meikle
Party	SNP	Labour	Conservative
Leader's seat	Langside	Shettleston	Pollokshields
Last election	27 seats, 32.6%	44 seats, 46.7%	1 seat, 5.9%
Seats won	39	31	8
Seat change	▲12	▼13	▲7
Popular vote	70,239	51,778	25,018
Percentage	41.0%	30.2%	14.6%
Swing	▲8.4%	▼16.5%	▲8.65%
	Fourth party	Fifth party
Party	Green	Liberal Democrats
Last election	5 seats, 5.5%	1 seat, 2.93%
Seats won	7	0
Seat change	▲2	▼1
Popular vote	14,925	5,013
Percentage	8.7%	2.92%
Swing	▲3.2%	▼0.01%

Council Leader before election
Frank McAveety
Labour
Council Leader after election
Susan Aitken
Scottish National Party

The Glasgow City Council election of 2017 was held on 4 May 2017, the same day as the 31 other Scottish local government elections. The election was the first to use 23 new wards, created as a result of the Local Government Boundary Commission for Scotland's 5th Review. Each ward elected three or four councillors using the single transferable vote system, a form of proportional representation used since the 2007 election and according to the Local Governance (Scotland) Act 2004.

As predicted in the weeks leading up to the election, the Scottish Labour were replaced by the Scottish National Party as the largest party in the council, a first for the SNP and ending Labour's 37-year tenure of control, although the SNP were four seats short of an overall majority. The Scottish Conservatives gained seven seats, their best result since the 1984 election. This included some unexpected victories in wards such as Shettleston and Calton, some of Glasgow's most deprived areas in the east. The Scottish Greens also made gains to give them their best ever result in Glasgow's local elections, taking seven seats, two more than in 2012, and topping the first-preference vote in Hillhead to the west. The Scottish Liberal Democrats lost their only remaining seat, making this council the first without any Liberal representation since 1974.

On 18 May, the SNP formally took control of the council as a minority administration with SNP members filling the positions of council leader, depute council leader, and Lord Provost.

== Election results ==

2017 Glasgow City Council election
Party	Seats	Gains	Losses	Net gain/loss	Seats %	Votes %	Votes	+/−
SNP	39	12	0	▲12	45.88	40.96	70,239	▲8.39
Labour	31	0	13	▼13	36.47	30.20	51,778	▼16.52
Conservative	8	7	0	▲7	9.41	14.59	25,018	▲8.65
Green	7	3	1	▲2	8.24	8.70	14,925	▲3.15
Liberal Democrats	0	0	1	▼1	0.00	2.92	5,013	▼0.01
Independent	0	0	0	Steady	0.00	1.30	2,237	▼0.40
UKIP	0	0	0	Steady	0.00	0.57	969	▲0.27
TUSC	0	0	0	Steady	0.00	0.27	464	▼0.13
Solidarity	0	0	0	Steady	0.00	0.22	373	▼0.18
Scottish Socialist	0	0	0	Steady	0.00	0.12	202	▼0.58
BUP	0	0	0	Steady	0.00	0.09	150	New
SDP	0	0	0	Steady	0.00	0.03	51	New
Scottish Libertarian	0	0	0	Steady	0.00	0.03	46	New
Turnout		171,465						

Note: "Votes" are the first preference votes. The net gain/loss and percentage changes relate to the result of the previous Scottish local elections on 3 May 2012. This may differ from other published sources showing gain/loss relative to seats held at dissolution of Scotland's councils.

== Retiring Councillors ==
Council Ward	Departing Councillor	Party
Baillieston	Austin Sheridan	Scottish National Party
Partick West	Aileen Colleran	Scottish Labour
Linn	Sadie Docherty	Scottish Labour
Drumchapel/Anniesland	Judith Fisher	Scottish Labour
Drumchapel/Anniesland	Jonathan Findlay	Scottish Labour
Garscadden/Scotstounhill	Paul Rooney	Scottish Labour
Hillhead	Pauline McKeever	Scottish Labour
Canal	Helen Stephen	Scottish Labour
Calton	Yvonne Kucuk	Scottish Labour (suspended)
North East	Maureen Burke	Scottish Labour
Canal	Kieran Wild	Scottish Greens
Anderston/City	Nina Baker	Scottish Greens

== Ward summary ==
Results of the 2017 Glasgow City Council election by ward
Ward	%	Seats	%	Seats	%	Seats	%	Seats	%	Seats	%	Seats	Total
Ward	SNP		Labour		Conservative		Green		Lib Dem		Others		Total
Linn	35.52	2	27.01	1	15.85	1	3.27	0	7.68	0	10.66	0	4
Newlands/Auldburn	40.08	1	28.57	1	21.97	1	5.81	0	3.57	0	0	0	3
Greater Pollok	40.55	2	38.17	2	13.94	0	2.35	0	1.54	0	3.45	0	4
Cardonald	43.34	2	37.80	2	11.68	0	2.52	0	1.97	0	2.69	0	4
Govan	43.73	2	31.59	1	11.41	0	9.32	1	2.19	0	1.76	0	4
Pollokshields	36.22	1	23.26	1	23.04	1	13.60	1	2.94	0	0.95	0	4
Langside	43.11	2	26.29	1	13.57	0	11.88	1	3.26	0	1.89	0	4
Southside Central	43.43	2	34.75	2	6.70	0	11.29	0	1.43	0	2.40	0	4
Calton	47.23	2	27.79	1	11.43	1	8.95	0	1.86	0	2.74	0	4
Anderston/City/Yorkhill	39.37	2	28.50	1	9.88	0	18.32	1	2.51	0	1.41	0	4
Hillhead	37.16	1	21.73	1	10.14	0	25.63	1	4.45	0	0.89	0	3
Victoria Park	36.44	1	19.97	1	23.69	1	13.50	0	5.78	0	0.61	0	3
Garscadden/Scotstounhill	44.87	2	33.75	2	12.20	0	5.05	0	2.20	0	1.93	0	4
Drumchapel/Anniesland	44.43	2	37.32	2	11.59	0	4.27	0	0	0	2.39	0	4
Maryhill	47.70	2	28.46	1	10.58	0	8.81	0	4.45	0	0	0	3
Canal	42.40	2	34.52	2	8.84	0	4.77	0	0.97	0	8.51	0	4
Springburn/Robroyston	43.06	2	39.70	2	10.36	0	3.44	0	1.29	0	2.15	0	4
East Centre	45.38	2	36.21	2	13.39	0	2.66	0	0	0	2.35	0	4
Shettleston	37.76	2	36.71	1	18.10	1	2.94	0	1.09	0	3.40	0	4
Baillieston	44.56	1	28.81	1	20.97	1	2.29	0	1.92	0	1.46	0	3
North East	39.63	2	35.18	1	12.14	0	2.36	0	0	0	10.68	0	3
Dennistoun	38.79	1	31.49	1	7.78	0	19.49	1	2.45	0	0	0	3
Partick East/Kelvindale	34.30	1	17.57	1	22.21	1	16.42	1	8.45	0	1.04	0	4
Total	40.96	39	30.20	31	14.59	8	8.70	7	2.92	0	2.62	0	85

== Ward results ==
=== Ward 1: Linn ===
- 2012 2 × Lab; 1 × SNP; 1 × Lib Dem
- 2017 2 × SNP; 1 × Lab; 1 × Con
- 2012–2017 change SNP and Con gain each one seat from Lab and Lib Dem

Linn – 4 seats
Party	Candidate	FPv%	Count										
Party	Candidate	FPv%	1	2	3	4	5	6	7	8	9	10	11
SNP	Glenn Elder (incumbent)††	18.70%	1,646	1,648	1,655	1,655	1,720	1,864					
SNP	Margaret Morgan	11.72%	1,032	1,032	1,037	1,040	1,105	1,357	1,439	1,532	1,802		
Labour	Malcolm Cunning (incumbent)	15.32%	1,348	1,357	1,365	1,370	1,400	1,415	1,417	1,558	1,655	1,661	2,646
Conservative	Euan Blockley	15.85%	1,395	1,410	1,411	1,415	1,426	1,429	1,429	1,580	1,613	1,613	1,657
Labour	Alan Stewart	11.69%	1,029	1,034	1,039	1,047	1,070	1,078	1,080	1,173	1,279	1,285	
Independent	Cathy Milligan	8.45%	744	752	768	797	845	866	874	937			
Liberal Democrats	Margot Clark (incumbent)	7.68%	676	676	678	685	707	714	716				
SNP	Paul Leinster	5.09%	448	448	448	450	466						
Green	Alan Digney	3.27%	288	293	303	310							
Independent	Bobby Pollock	0.78%	69	72	74								
Solidarity	Max Brodie	0.76%	67	70									
UKIP	John Cowan	0.66%	58										
Electorate: 22,310 Valid: 8,800 Spoilt: 259 Quota: 1,761 Turnout: 40.6%

=== Ward 2: Newlands/Auldburn ===
2012: 2 × Lab; 1 × SNP
2017: 1 × SNP; 1 × Lab; 1 × Con
2012–2017 change: Con gain one seat from Lab

Newlands/Auldburn- 3 seats
Party	Candidate	FPv%	Count						
Party	Candidate	FPv%	1	2	3	4	5	6	7
SNP	Josephine Docherty (incumbent)	25.87%	1,879						
Labour Co-op	Stephan Curran (incumbent)	23.46%	1,704	1,708	1,776	2,043			
Conservative	Kyle Thornton	21.97%	1,596	1,597	1,646	1,669	1,709	1,775	2,158
SNP	Gavin Williamson	14.21%	1,032	1,079	1,094	1,111	1,138	1,409	
Green	Charles Gay	5.81%	422	427	500	525	569		
Labour Co-op	Fay Graham	5.11%	371	373	391				
Liberal Democrats	Rebecca Coleman-Bennett	3.57%	259	260					
Electorate: 17,775 Valid: 7,263 Spoilt: 251 Quota: 1,816 Turnout: 42.3%

=== Ward 3: Greater Pollok ===
2012: 2 × Lab; 2 × SNP
2017: 2 × SNP; 2 × Lab 2012–2017 change: No change

Greater Pollok – 4 seats
Party	Candidate	FPv%	Count									
Party	Candidate	FPv%	1	2	3	4	5	6	7	8	9	10
SNP	David McDonald (incumbent)	31,02%	2,643									
Labour	Saqib Ahmed	25.97%	2,213									
SNP	Rhiannon Spear	9.53%	812	1,566	1,575	1,580	1,597	1,608	1,636	1,747		
Labour	Rashid Hussain (incumbent)	12.19%	1,039	1,083	1,508	1,511	1,523	1,556	1,591	1,654	1,665	2,106
Conservative	Rory O'Brien	13.94%	1,188	1,199	1,208	1,211	1,218	1,253	1,297	1,329	1,330	
Green	Seonad Hoy	2.35%	200	233	243	246	273	298	333			
Independent	George Laird	1.91%	163	172	179	201	212	229				
Liberal Democrats	Will Millinship	1.54%	131	141	146	151	157					
TUSC	Mark McGowan	0.90%	77	89	92	95						
Independent	Dean Ward	0.63%	54	59	59							
Electorate: 24,050 Valid: 8,520 Spoilt: 268 Quota: 1,705 Turnout: 36.5%

=== Ward 4: Cardonald ===
- 2017: 2 × SNP; 2 × Lab
- 2012–2017 ×hange: New ward

Cardonald – 4 seats
Party	Candidate	FPv%	Count								
Party	Candidate	FPv%	1	2	3	4	5	6	7	8	9
SNP	Elaine McSporran	20.66%	1,913								
Labour Co-op	Matt Kerr (incumbent)	20.45%	1,894								
SNP	Alex Wilson (incumbent)	14.39%	1,333	1,345	1,346	1,350	1,371	1,381	1,455	2,192	
Labour Co-op	Alistair Watson (incumbent)†	17.35%	1,607	1,608	1,637	1,655	1,677	1,732	1,782	1,829	1,912
Conservative	Judy Lockhart	11.68%	1,082	1,082	1,084	1,121	1,129	1,167	1,180	1,189	1,197
SNP	Joe Murray	8.29%	768	810	811	816	837	847	927		
Green	Alan Sharkey	2.52%	233	234	235	244	268	309			
Liberal Democrats	Isabel Nelson	1.97%	182	182	184	190	196				
Solidarity	Lynn Sheridan	1.41%	131	132	133	141					
UKIP	Robert Barclay	1.27%	118	118	119						
Electorate: 22,853 Valid: 9,261 Spoilt: 321 Quota: 1,853 Turnout: 41.9%

=== Ward 5: Govan ===
2012: 2 × Lab; 1 × SNP; 1 × GlasgowFirst
2017: 2 × SNP; 1 × Lab; 1 × Green
2012–2017 Change: SNP and Green gain each one seat from Lab and GlasgowFirst

Govan – 4 seats
Party	Candidate	FPv%	Count									
Party	Candidate	FPv%	1	2	3	4	5	6	7	8	9	10
Labour	John Kane (incumbent)	23.46%	1,520									
SNP	Stephen Dornan (incumbent)	17.13%	1,110	1,121	1,125	1,131	1,150	1,581				
SNP	Richard Bell	16.92%	1,096	1,100	1,105	1,115	1,122	1,259	1,486			
Green	Allan Young	9.32%	604	613	621	649	690	745	765	835	952	1,099
Conservative	Susan McCourt	11.41%	739	752	753	757	793	795	798	801	881	
Labour	Muhammad Shoaib	8.13%	527	670	674	680	704	707	715	730		
SNP	Pamela Wilson	9.68%	627	630	633	637	642					
Liberal Democrats	Benjamin Denton-Cardew	2.19%	142	147	150	160						
Scottish Socialist	Bill Bonnar	1.08%	70	72	85							
Solidarity	Liza Farrell	0.68%	44	46								
Electorate: 19,658 Valid: 6,479 Spoilt: 266 Quota: 1,296 Turnout: 34.3%

=== Ward 6: Pollokshields ===
2012: 1 × Lab; 1 × SNP; 1 × Con
2017: 1 × SNP; 1 × Con; 1 × Lab; 1 × Green
2007–2012 change: 1 additional seat compared to 2012, won by Green

Pollokshields – 4 seats
Party	Candidate	FPv%	Count							
Party	Candidate	FPv%	1	2	3	4	5	6	7	8
SNP	Norman MacLeod (incumbent)	24.34%	2,504							
Conservative	David Meikle (incumbent)	23.04%	2,370							
Labour	Hanif Raja (incumbent)	15.09%	1,552	1,570	1,607	1,621	1,700	2,378		
Green	Jon Molyneux	13.59%	1,399	1,461	1,482	1,497	1,645	1,727	1,786	2,760
SNP	Nighet Riaz	11.88%	1,222	1,542	1,549	1,556	1,569	1,617	1,684	
Labour	Fariha Thomas (incumbent) *	8.17%	841	848	878	890	954			
Liberal Democrats	Ewan Hoyle	2.94%	302	311	382	413				
UKIP	Iain Cameron	0.95%	98	100	132					
Electorate: 21,700 Valid: 10,288 Spoilt: 261 Quota: 2,058 Turnout: 48.6%

* = Sitting Councillor for Govan ward.

=== Ward 7: Langside ===
2012: 1 × SNP; 1 × Lab; 1 × Green
2017: 2 × SNP; 1 × Lab; 1 × Green
2012–2017 change: 1 additional seat compared to 2012, won by SNP

Langside – 4 seats
Party	Candidate	FPv%	Count								
Party	Candidate	FPv%	1	2	3	4	5	6	7	8	9
SNP	Susan Aitken (incumbent)	26.84%	2,874								
SNP	Anna Richardson (incumbent)	16.37%	1,760	2,310							
Labour	Archie Graham (incumbent)	19.43%	2,089	2,140	2,153						
Green	Tanya Wisely	11.88%	1,277	1,340	1,437	1,438	1,496	1,506	1,622	1,863	2,223
Conservative	Thomas Haddow	13.57%	1,459	1,465	1,467	1,467	1,468	1,511	1,593	1,766	
Labour	Steven Livingston	6.86%	737	745	752	755	772	788	878		
Liberal Democrats	Kevin Lewsey	3.26%	350	355	360	360	364	374			
UKIP	Jane Collins	0.99%	106	110	111	111	114				
TUSC	Ronnie Stevenson	0.90%	97	98	103	103					
Electorate: 24,301 Valid: 10,749 Spoilt: 279 Quota: 2,150 Turnout: 45.4%

=== Ward 8: Southside Central ===
2012: 2 × Lab; 2 × SNP
2017: 2 × SNP; 2 × Lab
2012–2017 change: No change

Southside Central – 4 seats
Party	Candidate	FPv%	Count									
Party	Candidate	FPv%	1	2	3	4	5	6	7	8	9	10
SNP	Mhairi Hunter (incumbent)	17.74%	1,287	1,292	1,298	1,301	1,309	1,637				
Labour	Soryia Siddique (incumbent)	18.35%	1,331	1,334	1,356	1,361	1,408	1,508				
SNP	Alexander Belic	17.15%	1,244	1,249	1,252	1,258	1,271	1,353	1,500			
Labour	James Scanlon (incumbent)	16.40%	1,190	1,194	1,216	1,237	1,383	1,393	1,398	1,434	1,439	1,886
Green	Cass MacGregor	11.29%	819	829	856	870	944	971	991	995	1,012	
SNP	Qasim Hanif	8.55%	620	623	623	624	627					
Conservative	Gordon Fraser	6.69%	486	500	509	552						
UKIP	Lorraine Duncan	1.59%	115	120	126							
Liberal Democrats	Chris Young	1.43%	104	110								
Independent	Mark Fiddy	0.81%	59									
Electorate: 18,946 Valid: 7,255 Spoilt: 316 Quota: 1,452 Turnout: 40.0%

=== Ward 9: Calton ===
2012: 2 × Lab; 1 × SNP
2017: 2 × SNP; 1 × Lab; 1 × Con
2007–2012 change: 1 additional seat compared to 2012, won by Con

Calton – 4 seats
Party	Candidate	FPv%	Count								
Party	Candidate	FPv%	1	2	3	4	5	6	7	8	9
SNP	Greg Hepburn (incumbent)	25.33%	1,389								
Labour	Cecilia O'Lone	16.81%	922	929	941	966	1,048	1,542			
SNP	Jennifer Layden	12.58%	690	867	883	890	1,080	1,101			
Conservative	Robert Connelly	11.43%	627	628	647	708	732	758	824	824	966
SNP	Linda Pike	9.32%	511	575	580	582	699	717	769	772	
Labour	Thomas Rannachan	10.98%	602	604	607	627	663				
Green	Lorraine McLaren	8.95%	491	502	535	548					
BUP	Kris McGurk	2.74%	150	151	155						
Liberal Democrats	John MacPherson	1.86%	102	103							
Electorate: 18,322 Valid: 5,484 Spoilt: 215 Quota: 1,097 Turnout: 31.1%

=== Ward 10: Anderston/City/Yorkhill ===
2012: 2 × Lab; 1 × SNP; 1 × Green
2017: 2 × SNP; 1 × Lab; 1 × Green
2012–2017 change: SNP gain one seat from Lab

Anderston/City/Yorkhill – 4 seats
Party	Candidate	FPv%	Count							
Party	Candidate	FPv%	1	2	3	4	5	6	7	8
SNP	Eva Bolander (incumbent)	26.47%	1,591							
Labour	Philip Braat (incumbent)	22.09%	1,328							
Green	Christy Mearns	18.32%	1,101	1,146	1,155	1,161	1,187	1,254		
SNP	Angus Millar (incumbent)	12.89%	775	1,072	1,078	1,080	1,090	1,098	1,127	1,224
Conservative	Cameron Stewart	9.88%	594	597	604	607	620	649	650	716
Labour	Faten Hameed	6.41%	385	394	470	472	476	510	520	
Liberal Democrats	James Harrison	2.51%	151	154	160	162	168			
Independent	Gerry Creechan	0.92%	55	61	65	76				
Independent	Gordon Keane	0.49%	30	31	32					
Electorate: 19,071 Valid: 6,010 Spoilt: 172 Quota: 1,203 Turnout: 32.4%

=== Ward 11: Hillhead ===
2012: 1 × SNP; 1 × Green; 2 × Lab
2017: 1 × Green; 1 × Lab; 1 × SNP
2012–2017 change: 1 less seat compared to 2012, lost by Lab

Hillhead – 3 seats
Party	Candidate	FPv%	Count							
Party	Candidate	FPv%	1	2	3	4	5	6	7	8
Green	Martha Wardrop (incumbent)	25.63%	1,718							
Labour	Hanzala Malik	21.73%	1,457	1,464	1,465	1,469	1,625	1,935		
SNP	Ken Andrew (incumbent)	22.49%	1,508	1,516	1,519	1,522	1,545	1.575	1,624	2,632
SNP	Caroline Welsh	14.66%	983	998	1,000	1,004	1,030	1,046	1,076	
Conservative	Martyn McIntyre	10.14%	680	680	686	693	744			
Liberal Democrats	Matthew Clark	4.45%	298	303	307	311				
No label	Douglas Timmons	0.51%	34	34	37					
Scottish Libertarian	Anthony Sammeroff	0.39%	26	26						
Electorate: 17,923 Valid: 6,704 Spoilt: 89 Quota: 1,677 Turnout: 37.9%

=== Ward 12: Victoria Park ===
2017: 1 × SNP; 1 × Con; 1 × Lab
2012–2017 change: New ward

Victoria Park – 3 seats
Party	Candidate	FPv%	Count						
Party	Candidate	FPv%	1	2	3	4	5	6	7
SNP	Feargal Dalton *	26.39%	2,248						
Conservative	Ade Aibinu	23.69%	2,018	2,019	2,022	2,148			
Labour	Maggie McTernan	19.97%	1,701	1,706	1,722	1,872	1,879	1,977	3,001
Green	Allan Faulds	13.50%	1,150	1,172	1,190	1,336	1,339	1,937	
SNP	Deirdre Parkinson	10.05%	856	936	941	961	962		
Liberal Democrats	James Douglas Speirs	5.78%	492	494	497				
TUSC	Matt McGrath	0.61%	52	52					
Electorate: 17,660 Valid: 8,517 Spoilt: 117 Quota: 2,130 Turnout: 48.9%

* = Sitting Councillor for Partick West ward.

=== Ward 13: Garscadden/Scotstounhill ===
2012: 3 x Lab; 1 × SNP
2017: 2 × Lab; 2 × SNP
2012–2017 change: SNP gains one seat from Lab

Garscadden/Scotstounhill – 4 seats
Party	Candidate	FPv%	Count									
Party	Candidate	FPv%	1	2	3	4	5	6	7	8	9	10
Labour	Bill Butler *	23.25%	2,020									
SNP	Michael Cullen†††††	20.15%	1,751									
SNP	Chris Cunningham (incumbent)	14.05%	1,221	1,233	1,243	1,261	1,269	1,282	1,424	2,345		
Labour	Eva Murray	10.49%	912	1,117	1,117	1,123	1,140	1,183	1,293	1,340	1,506	1,975
Conservative	Tariq Parvez	12.20%	1,060	1,070	1,070	1,072	1,108	1,161	1,191	1,203	1,217	
SNP	Roza Salih	10.66%	926	927	929	934	935	941	1,066			
Green	Gillian MacDonald	5.05%	439	445	445	460	478	525				
Liberal Democrats	David Walker	2.19%	191	194	194	197	207					
UKIP	Gisela Allen	1.22%	106	110	110	114						
Solidarity	Samuel Cook	0.71%	62	65	65							
Electorate: 22,514 Valid: 8,688 Spoilt: 338 Quota: 1,738 Turnout: 40.1%

* = Sitting Councillor for Greater Pollok ward.

=== Ward 14: Drumchapel/Anniesland ===
2007: 3 x Lab; 1 × SNP
2012: 2 × SNP; 2 × Lab
2007–2012 change: SNP gain one seat from Lab

Drumchapel/Anniesland – 4 seats
Party	Candidate	FPv%	Count									
Party	Candidate	FPv%	1	2	3	4	5	6	7	8	9	10
Labour	Paul Carey (incumbent)	24.83%	1,871									
SNP	Malcolm Balfour (incumbent)	24.45%	1,842									
SNP	Elspeth Kerr ††††††	10.98%	827	849	1,073	1,086	1,095	1,101	1,213	1,963		
Labour	Anne McTaggart††††	12.49%	941	1,177	1,189	1,194	1,213	1,288	1,308	1,327	1,456	1,876
Conservative	Patrick Logue	11.59%	873	895	898	903	904	945	962	966	981	
SNP	Malcolm Mitchell	8.99%	678	682	733	738	747	749	829			
Green	Louisa McGuigan	4.27%	322	331	348	353	369	379				
UKIP	Bryan Free	1.25%	94	101	105	106	106					
Scottish Socialist	Joe Meehan	0.68%	51	56	58	63						
Solidarity	Gary Kelly	0.46%	35	42	48							
Electorate: 21,507 Valid: 7,534 Spoilt: 308 Quota: 1,507 Turnout: 36.5%

=== Ward 15: Maryhill ===
2017: 2 × SNP; 1 × Lab
2012–2017 change: New ward

Maryhill – 3 seats
Party	Candidate	FPv%	Count					
Party	Candidate	FPv%	1	2	3	4	5	6
SNP	John Letford *	24.75%	1,418	1,439				
Labour	Jane Morgan	21.12%	1,210	1,277	1,277	1,618		
SNP	Franny Scally *	22.95%	1,315	1,328	1,332	1,359	1,387	1,758
Conservative	Jane Burge	10.58%	606	646	646	665	695	743
Green	Michael Herrigan	8.81%	505	562	562	585	617	
Labour	Mohammed Razaq *	7.33%	421	445	445			
Liberal Democrats	Alex Dingwall	4.45%	255					
Electorate: 15,247 Valid: 5,730 Spoilt: 206 Quota: 1,433 Turnout: 38.9%

* = Sitting Councillors for Maryhill/Kelvin ward.

=== Ward 16: Canal ===
2012: 2 × Lab; 1 × SNP; 1 × Green
2017: 2 × SNP; 2 × Lab
2012–2017 change: SNP gain one seat from Green

Canal – 4 seats
Party	Candidate	FPv%	Count										
Party	Candidate	FPv%	1	2	3	4	5	6	7	8	9	10	11
SNP	Allan Gow	29.93%	1,727										
Labour	Gary Gray	25.54%	1,474										
SNP	Jacqueline McLaren	12.48%	720	1,187									
Labour	Robert Mooney	8.98%	518	526	747	749	755	769	778	792	889	1,015	1,195
Conservative	Esme Clark	8.84%	510	516	529	529	531	538	556	561	583	636	
Independent	Billy McAllister (incumbent)	5.39%	311	332	343	346	353	359	371	389	449		
Green	Andrew Smith	4.77%	275	297	304	315	320	339	343	367			
TUSC	Angela McCormick	1.07%	62	69	77	78	84	87	94				
UKIP	Stuart Maskell	1.11%	64	67	73	73	73	74					
Liberal Democrats	Andrew Chamberlain	0.97%	56	57	61	62	63						
Independent	Amjad Mirza	0.94%	54	56	60	60							
Electorate: 19,137 Valid: 5,771 Spoilt: 327 Quota: 1,155 Turnout: 31.9%

=== Ward 17: Springburn/Robroyston ===
2017: 2 × Lab; 2 × SNP
2012–2017 change: New ward

Springburn/Robroyston – 4 seats
Party	Candidate	FPv%	Count								
Party	Candidate	FPv%	1	2	3	4	5	6	7	8	9
Labour	Martin McElroy *	31.64%	2,080								
SNP	Graham Campbell	20.13%	1,323								
SNP	Christina Cannon	15.41%	1,013	1,037	1,043	1,049	1,058	1,059	1,160	1,619	
Labour	Aileen McKenzie	8.05%	529	1,135	1,135	1,140	1,167	1,190	1,237	1,256	1,328
Conservative	Euan McHardy	10.36%	681	709	709	712	727	769	790	797	806
SNP	Paul McCabe	7.52%	494	502	503	505	508	513	534		
Green	Anthony Carroll	3.44%	226	241	242	255	268	287			
UKIP	Robb MacLean	1.59%	105	112	112	114	120				
Liberal Democrats	Robert Sykes	1.29%	85	90	90	91					
TUSC	Dave Semple	0.55%	36	37	37						
Electorate: 19,554 Valid: 6,572 Spoilt: 300 Quota: 1,315 Turnout: 35.1%

* = Sitting Councillor for Hillhead ward.

=== Ward 18: East Centre ===
2012: 3 x Lab; 1 × SNP
2017: 2 × Lab; 2 × SNP
2012–2017 changes: SNP gain one seat from Lab

East Centre – 4 seats
Party	Candidate	FPv%	Count								
Party	Candidate	FPv%	1	2	3	4	5	6	7	8	9
Labour	Frank Docherty (incumbent)	28.16%	1,998								
SNP	Annette Christie	22.24%	1,578								
SNP	Russell Robertson (incumbent)†††	13.32%	945	955	996	1,001	1,011	1,050	1,787		
Labour	Marie Garrity *	8.05%	571	1,050	1,052	1,077	1,090	1,135	1,169	1,239	1,659
Conservative	Maria Wells	13.39%	950	963	964	971	991	1,016	1,027	1,037	
SNP	Mark Coburn	9.81%	696	704	803	810	817	879			
Green	Kenneth Whyte	2.66%	189	194	199	216	250				
Independent	Andrew McCullagh	1.23%	87	91	93	105					
TUSC	Matt Dobson	1.13%	80	89	91						
Electorate: 19,978 Valid: 7,094 Spoilt: 368 Quota: 1,419 Turnout: 37.4%

* = Sitting Councillor for the Baillieston ward.

=== Ward 19: Shettleston ===
2007: 3 x Lab; 1 × SNP
2017: 2 × SNP; 1 × Lab; 1 × Con
2012–2017 change: Con and SNP gain each one seat from Lab

Shettleston – 4 seats
Party	Candidate	FPv%	Count										
Party	Candidate	FPv%	1	2	3	4	5	6	7	8	9	10	11
Labour	Frank McAveety (incumbent)	25.17%	1,902										
SNP	Laura Doherty	17.95%	1,356	1,364	1,368	1,370	1,379	1,384	1,387	1,477	1,600		
Conservative	Thomas Kerr	18.10%	1,368	1,381	1,390	1,394	1,399	1,409	1,448	1,462	1,468	1,469	1,671
SNP	Michelle Ferns †††††††††	10.23%	773	778	779	782	785	785	786	811	1,377	1,453	1,597
Labour	Anne Simpson (incumbent)	11.54%	872	1,162	1,164	1,173	1,184	1,214	1,238	1,275	1,278	1,289	
SNP	Alex Kerr	9.58%	724	729	731	736	739	743	751	774			
Green	Kevin Campbell	2.94%	222	225	231	234	249	265	274				
UKIP	Jamie Robertson	1.39%	105	110	111	120	122	129					
Liberal Democrats	Timothy Pollard	1.09%	82	87	88	94	96						
TUSC	Jamie Cocozza	0.79%	60	63	67	69							
SDP	Steven Marshall	0.67%	51	54	56								
Independent	Paul Corran	0.54%	41	41									
Electorate: 21,134 Valid: 7,556 Spoilt: 326 Quota: 1,512 Turnout: 37.3%

=== Ward 20: Baillieston ===
2012: 2 × Lab; 2 × SNP
2017: 1 × SNP; 1 × Lab; 1 × Con
2012–2017 changes: 1 fewer seat than in 2012

Ballieston – 3 seats
Party	Candidate	FPv%	Count								
Party	Candidate	FPv%	1	2	3	4	5	6	7	8	9
SNP	Elaine Ballantyne	32.63%	2,263								
Labour	Jim Coleman (incumbent)††††††††	22.52%	1,562	1,608	1,609	1,618	1,644	1,669	2,032		
Conservative	Philip Charles	20.96%	1,454	1,463	1,465	1,468	1,492	1,507	1,524	1,590	1,884
SNP	David Turner (incumbent)	11.93%	827	1,224	1,228	1,249	1,262	1,362	1,386	1,420	
Labour	Theresa Keenan	6.27%	436	448	450	457	468	491			
Green	Kayleigh Van Dongen	2.29%	159	180	181	213	243				
Liberal Democrats	Richard Stalley	1.92%	133	136	140	143					
Scottish Socialist	Liam McLaughlan	1.17%	81	86	87						
Scottish Libertarian	Scott McKelvie	0.29%	20	21							
Electorate: 17,722 Valid: 6,935 Spoilt: 237 Quota: 1,734 Turnout: 40.5%

=== Ward 21: North East ===
2012: 3 x Lab; 1 × SNP
2017: 2 × SNP; 1 × Lab
2012–2017 changes: SNP gain one seat from Lab

North East – 3 seats
Party	Candidate	FPv%	Count							
Party	Candidate	FPv%	1	2	3	4	5	6	7	8
Labour	Maureen Burke (incumbent)	27.25%	1,176							
SNP	Ruairi Kelly	22.50%	971	974	979	991	1,030	1,160		
SNP	Mandy Morgan	17.13%	739	740	743	771	792	871	940	1,035
Conservative	Frances Howell	12.14%	524	527	528	543	607	684	684	
Independent	Gerry Boyle (incumbent)	9.89%	427	432	437	452	534			
Labour	Stephen Docherty	7.93%	342	411	415	438				
Green	Carole Ure	2.36%	102	103	109					
Solidarity	Jenny Kiernan	0.79%	34	35						
Electorate: 15,406 Valid: 4,315 Spoilt: 198 Quota: 1,079 Turnout: 29.3%

=== Ward 22: Dennistoun ===
2017: 1 × Lab; 1 × SNP; 1 × Green
2012–2017 changes: New ward

Dennistoun – 3 seats
Party	Candidate	FPv%	Count						
Party	Candidate	FPv%	1	2	3	4	5	6	7
Labour	Elaine McDougall *	24.16%	1,310	1,336	1,677				
SNP	Allan Casey	24.41%	1,324	1,334	1,344	1,370			
Green	Kim Long	19.49%	1,057	1,100	1,107	1,160	1,162	1,258	1,781
SNP	Lorna Finn	14.38%	780	786	794	812	823	841	
Conservative	Michael Kusznir	7.78%	422	438	445	488	488		
Labour	Allan Stewart +	7.34%	398	405					
Liberal Democrats	Daniel Donaldson	2.45%	133						
Electorate: 15,471 Valid: 5,424 Spoilt: 228 Quota: 1,357 Turnout: 36.5%

- * = Sitting Councillor for East Centre ward.
- + = Sitting Councillor for Springburn ward.

=== Ward 23: Partick East/Kelvindale ===
2017: 1 × SNP; 1 × Con; 1 Lab; 1 × Green
2012–2017 change: New ward

Partick East/Kelvindale – 4 seats
Party	Candidate	FPv%	Count				
Party	Candidate	FPv%	1	2	3	4	5
SNP	Kenny McLean *	22.49%	2,366				
Conservative	Tony Curtis†††††††	22.12%	2,336				
Labour	Martin Rhodes +	17.57%	1,848	1,857	1,902	1,922	2,303
Green	Martin Bartos *	16.42%	1,727	1,763	1,779	1,812	2,148
SNP	Kaukab Stewart	11.80%	1,241	1,439	1,442	1,456	1,519
Liberal Democrats	Carole Ford	8.45%	889	894	974	1,009	
Independent	Tom Muirhead	1.04%	109	111	135		
Electorate: 21,691 Valid: 10,516 Spoilt: 80 Quota: 2,104 Turnout: 48.8%

- * = Sitting Councillors for Partick West ward.
- + = Sitting Councillor for Maryhill/Kelvin ward.

== Changes since 2017 ==
- † Cardonald ward Labour Cllr Alistair Watson died suddenly on 29 June 2017. A by-election was held on 7 September 2017 and was won by Jim Kavanagh of the Scottish Labour Party.
- †† Linn ward SNP Cllr Glenn Elder resigned the party whip on 18 April 2019, claiming that the SNP group in Glasgow has "lost focus" and promotes a "hostile" environment.
- ††† East Centre ward SNP Cllr Russell Robertson resigned from the party on 26 April 2019, citing concerns over the leadership of the SNP and council leader Susan Aitken.
- †††† Drumchapel/Anniesland ward Labour Cllr Anne McTaggart resigned from the party on 1 November 2019, and joined the SNP.
- ††††† Garscadden/Scotstounhill Cllr Michael Cullen resigned from the SNP on 10 July 2020, after being charged with fraud after wasting police time in connection with a sexual assault allegation.
- †††††† Drumchapel/Anniesland Cllr Elspeth Kerr resigned from the SNP on 10 July 2020 after objecting to Cllr Michael Cullen's resignation from the party.
- ††††††† Partick East/Kelvindale ward Conservative Cllr Tony Curtis resigned from the party in July 2020 in protest for the party's lack of support for the fitness industry. He would sit as independent councillor until his disqualification on 11 January 2021. Curtis was disqualified after not attending council meetings for six months. A by-election for the seat was held on 18 March 2021. Labour candidate Jill Brown won the by-election.
- †††††††† Baillieston ward Labour Cllr Jim Coleman was disqualified on 28 January 2021 after failing to attend council meetings for six months. A by-election for the seat was held 18 March 2021. SNP candidate and former ward councillor David Turner won the seat.
- ††††††††† Shettleston ward SNP Cllr Michelle Ferns defected to the Alba Party on 29 March 2021.
- Maryhill ward SNP Cllr John Letford defected to the Alba Party on 29 April 2021.
- Partick East/Kelvindale ward Greens Cllr Martin Bartos resigned his party membership, while remaining as an independent councillor.

== By-elections since 2017 ==
Cardonald by-election (7 September 2017) - 1 seat
Party	Candidate	FPv%	Count				
Party	Candidate	FPv%	1	2	3	4	5
Labour	Jim Kavanagh	48.6	2,614	2,615	2,641	2,683	2,936
SNP	Alex Mitchell	36.7	1,972	1,972	1,981	2,066	2,101
Conservative	Thomas Haddow	10.3	552	554	566	574	
Green	John Smith	2.7	147	151	161		
Liberal Democrats	Isabel Nelson	1.5	80	82			
Scottish Libertarian	Antony Sammeroff	0.2	12				
Electorate: 23,248 Valid: 5,377 Spoilt: 97 Quota: 2,689 Turnout: 23.7%

Baillieston by-election (18 March 2021) - 1 seat
Party	Candidate	FPv%	Count				
Party	Candidate	FPv%	1	2	3	4	5
SNP	David Turner	43.81%	1,980	1,980	1,990	2,092	2,133
Labour	William Docherty	28.27%	1,278	1,282	1,310	1,365	1,868
Conservative	John Daly	20.93%	946	953	965	979	
Green	Lorraine McLaren	4.42%	200	205	217		
Liberal Democrats	Daniel Donaldson	1.99%	90	92			
UKIP	Christopher Ho	0.58%	26				
Electorate: 18,323 Valid: 4,520 Spoilt: 50 Quota: 4,261 Turnout: 24.94%

Partick East/Kelvindale by-election (18 March 2021) - 1 seat
Party	Candidate	FPv%	Count				
Party	Candidate	FPv%	1	2	3	4	5
SNP	Abdul Bostani	32.08%	2,084	2,084	2,103	2,142	2,812
Labour	Jill Brown	28.26%	1,836	1,842	1,932	2,498	2,927
Green	Blair Anderson	18.47%	1,200	1,205	1,264	1,379	
Conservative	Naveed Ashgar	16.69%	1,084	1,092	1,148		
Liberal Democrats	Tahir Jameel	3.99%	259	260			
UKIP	Donald Mackay	0.51%	33				
Electorate: 22,163 Valid: 6,496 Spoilt: 51 Quota: 3,249 Turnout: 29.54%
