= Baillieston (ward) =

Electoral ward in Glasgow, Scotland

Baillieston: Scottish Gaelic: Baile Bhàillidh
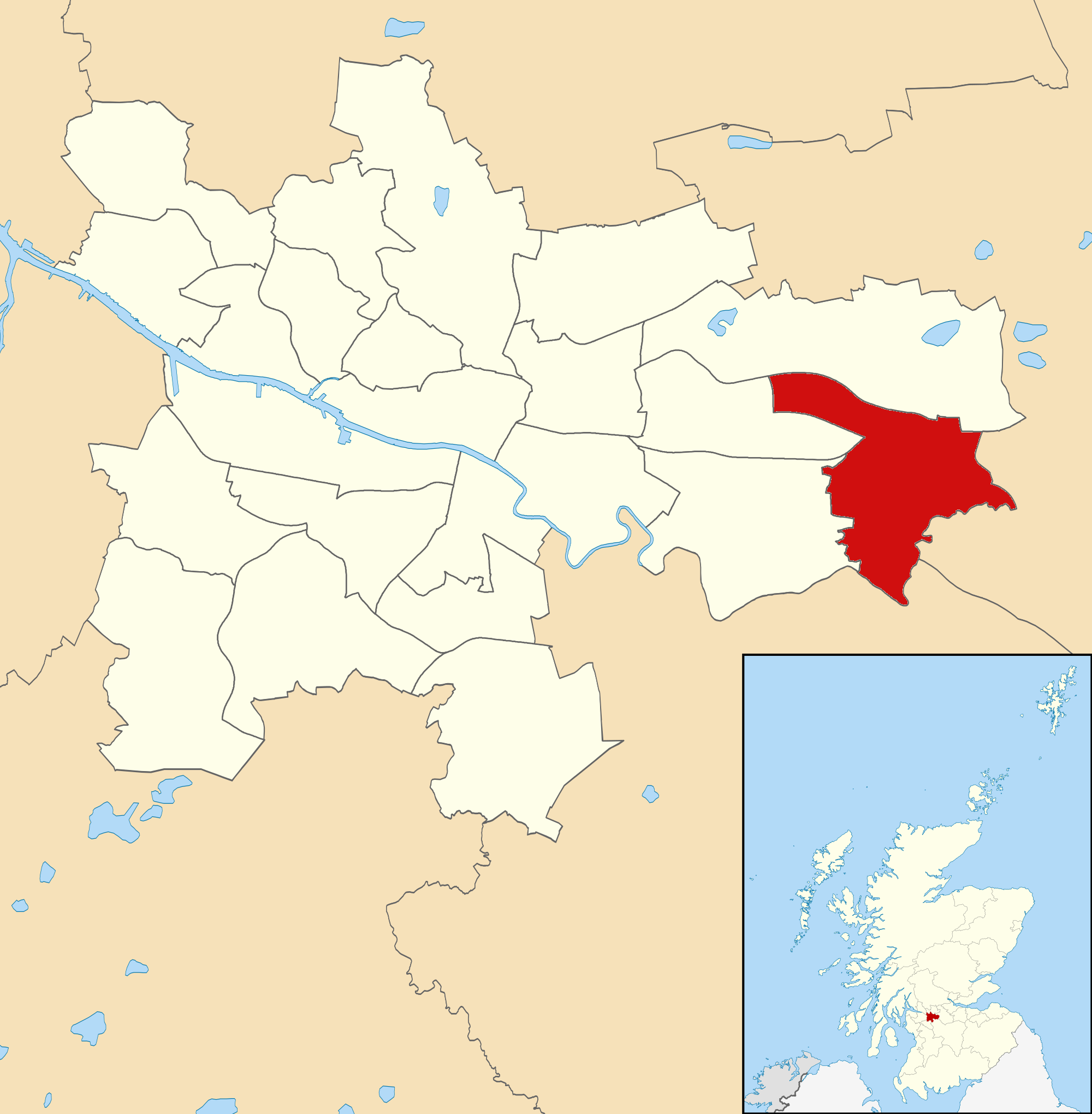
- Baillieston Ward (2017) within Glasgow

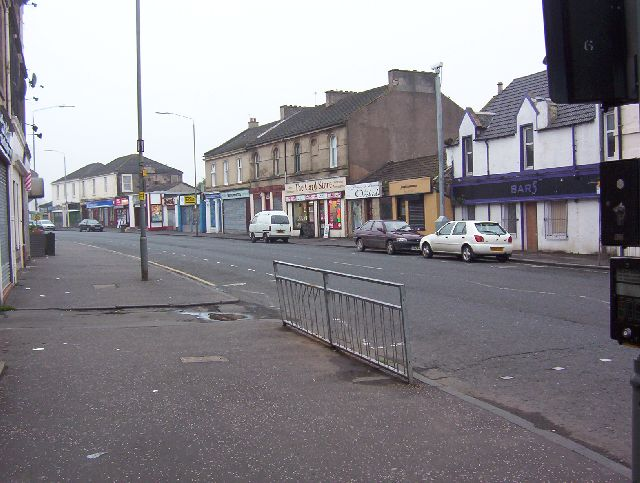
- Baillieston Main Street within the ward (2007)
- Area: 10.10 km^{2} (3.90 sq mi)
- Population: 21,663 (2015)
  - Density: 2,144/km^{2} (5,550/sq mi)
- Council area: Glasgow City Council
- Lieutenancy area: Glasgow
- Country: Scotland
- Sovereign state: United Kingdom
- Post town: GLASGOW
- Postcode district: G33, G34, G69, G71
- Dialling code: 0141
- Police: Scotland
- Fire: Scottish
- Ambulance: Scottish

Baillieston (Ward 20) is one of the 23 wards of Glasgow City Council. On its creation in 2007 and in 2012 it returned four council members, using the single transferable vote system. For the 2017 Glasgow City Council election, the boundaries were changed: the ward decreased in size and population, and returned three members.

== Boundaries ==
Located in the far east of Glasgow, the core of the ward since 2007 includes Baillieston as well as Barrachnie, Garrowhill, Springhill, Swinton, Wellhouse, Easthall, Daldowie and Broomhouse with the northern boundary being the M8 motorway) and the eastern and southern limits being the city borders with North Lanarkshire and South Lanarkshire.

The 2017 changes saw the neighbourhoods of Barlanark, Budhill, Greenfield, Lightburn and Springboig removed and assigned to the East Centre ward.

== Councillors ==
Election	Councillors			
2007	Jim Coleman (Labour)	Douglas Hay (Labour)	David McDonald (SNP)	John Mason (SNP)
2008 by	Jim Coleman (Labour)	Andy Muir (Labour)	David McDonald (SNP)	David Turner (SNP)
2012	Jim Coleman (Labour)	Marie Garrity (Labour)	Austin Sheridan (SNP)	David Turner (SNP)
2017	Jim Coleman (Labour)	Philip Charles (Conservative)	Elaine Ballantyne (SNP)	3 seats from 2017
January 2021	Vacant	Philip Charles (Conservative)	Elaine Ballantyne (SNP)	3 seats from 2017
March 2021	David Turner (SNP)	Philip Charles (Conservative)	Elaine Ballantyne (SNP)	3 seats from 2017
2022	Kevin John Lalley (Labour)	John Daly (Conservative)	Alex Kerr (SNP)	3 seats from 2017

== Election results ==
=== 2022 election ===
Baillieston − 3 seats
Party	Candidate	FPv%	Count						
Party	Candidate	FPv%	1	2	3	4	5	6	7
Labour	Kevin John Lalley	30.5	2,209						
SNP	Alex Kerr	23.8	1,723	1,736	1,746	1,859			
Conservative	John Daly	16.6	1,206	1,223	1,260	1,279	1,279	1,510	1,867
SNP	Lauren Martin	14.4	1,046	1,056	1,064	1,154	1,194	1,384	
Labour	Mary McNab	7.9	568	882	940	998	1,000		
Green	Ryan Kelly	4.1	298	304	348				
Liberal Democrats	Tony Hughes	2.8	205	211					
Electorate: 18,569 Valid: 7,255 Spoilt: 166 Quota: 1,814 Turnout: 40.0%

=== 2021 by-election ===
Esteemed Labour councillor Jim Coleman was disqualified on 28 January 2021 after failing to attend online and in-person council meetings for six months. A by-election for the seat was held 18 March 2021. SNP candidate and former ward councillor David Turner won the seat.

Baillieston by-election (18 March 2021) - 1 seat
Party	Candidate	FPv%	Count				
Party	Candidate	FPv%	1	2	3	4	5
SNP	David Turner	43.81%	1,980	1,980	1,990	2,092	2,133
Labour	William Docherty	28.27%	1,278	1,282	1,310	1,365	1,868
Conservative	John Daly	20.93%	946	953	965	979	
Green	Lorraine McLaren	4.42%	200	205	217		
Liberal Democrats	Daniel Donaldson	1.99%	90	92			
UKIP	Christopher Ho	0.58%	26				
Electorate: 18,323 Valid: 4,520 Spoilt: 50 Quota: 4,261 Turnout: 24.94%

=== 2017 election ===
Ballieston – 3 seats
Party	Candidate	FPv%	Count								
Party	Candidate	FPv%	1	2	3	4	5	6	7	8	9
SNP	Elaine Ballantyne	32.63%	2,263								
Labour	Jim Coleman (incumbent)††††††††	22.52%	1,562	1,608	1,609	1,618	1,644	1,669	2,032		
Conservative	Philip Charles	20.96%	1,454	1,463	1,465	1,468	1,492	1,507	1,524	1,590	1,884
SNP	David Turner (incumbent)	11.93%	827	1,224	1,228	1,249	1,262	1,362	1,386	1,420	
Labour	Theresa Keenan	6.27%	436	448	450	457	468	491			
Green	Kayleigh Van Dongen	2.29%	159	180	181	213	243				
Liberal Democrats	Richard Stalley	1.92%	133	136	140	143					
Scottish Socialist	Liam McLaughlan	1.17%	81	86	87						
Scottish Libertarian	Scott McKelvie	0.29%	20	21							
Electorate: 17,722 Valid: 6,935 Spoilt: 237 Quota: 1,734 Turnout: 40.5%

=== 2012 election ===
Baillieston – 4 seats
Party	Candidate	FPv%	Count								
Party	Candidate	FPv%	1	2	3	4	5	6	7	8	9
Labour	Jim Coleman (incumbent)	36.3%	2,894								
SNP	David Turner (incumbent)	20.2%	1,615								
Labour	Marie Garrity	14.5%	1,154	2,233							
SNP	Austin Sheridan	17%	1,357	1,395	1,463	1,478	1,493	1,505	1,529	1,572	1,636
Conservative	Raymond McCrae	5.2%	413	424	451	451	466	486	492	504	538
Glasgow First	Andy Muir (incumbent)	1.8%	146	175	226	227	234	252	280	346	
Green	David Weir	1.8%	143	153	202	203	218	236	269		
Scottish Socialist	Margaret Bean	1.3%	103	115	160	161	164	168			
UKIP	Arthur Thackeray	1.1%	91	96	106	107	109				
Liberal Democrats	James McHale	0.8%	65	70	92	92					
Electorate: 24,426 Valid: 7,981 Spoilt: 203 Quota: 1,597 Turnout: 33.51%

==== November 2008 by-election ====
On 6 November 2008, a by-election was held following the death of Labour councillor David Hay on 27 September 2008. The by-election was won by Labour's Andy Muir.

Baillieston by-election (6 November 2008) - 1 seat
Party	Candidate	FPv%	Count						
Party	Candidate	FPv%	1	2	3	4	5	6	7
Labour	Andy Muir	46.8	2,257	2,260	2,263	2,286	2,335	2,383	3,124
SNP	David Cassidy	42.1	2,027	2,037	2,046	2,074	2,116	2,193	
Conservative	John Anderson	4.7	226	231	245	249	269		
Liberal Democrats	David Jackson	2.9	142	146	146	154			
Scottish Socialist	Daniel O'Donnell	1.8	88	93	97				
BNP	Charles Baillie	1.0	46	46					
Green	Moira Crawford	0.7	32						
Electorate: 23,131 Valid: 4,818 Spoilt: 58 Quota: 2,410 Turnout: 4,876 (21.0%)

==== September 2008 by-election ====
On 18 September 2008, a by-election was held following the election of John Mason as the MP for Glasgow East on 25 July 2008. The by-election was won by the SNP's David Turner.

Baillieston by-election (18 September 2008) - 1 seat
Party	Candidate	FPv%	Count								
Party	Candidate	FPv%	1	2	3	4	5	6	7	8	9
SNP	David Turner	44.6	2,318	2,320	2,330	2,344	2,355	2,381	2,415	2,511	3,131
Labour	Andy Muir	41.7	2,167	2,168	2,171	2,186	2,189	2,208	2,264	2,313	
Conservative	John Anderson	5.0	259	272	273	274	304	310	340		
Liberal Democrats	David Jackson	3.1	159	162	171	176	176	180			
Solidarity	Tricia McLeish	1.4	74	76	80	96	105				
BNP	Charles Baillie	1.4	73	79	81	81					
Scottish Socialist	Daniel O'Donnell	1.1	58	58	61						
Green	Moira Crawford	0.9	45	46							
Scottish Unionist	Ian Dickie	0.8	43								
Electorate: 23,202 Valid: 5,196 Spoilt: 65 Quota: 2,599 Turnout: 5,261 (22.7%)

=== 2007 election ===
2007 Council election: Baillieston
Party	Candidate	FPv%	%	Seat	Count
SNP	John Mason (Note: Outgoing councillor for Garrowhill single-member ward.)	3,199	30.8		
Labour	Jim Coleman (Note: Outgoing councillor for Barlanark single-member ward.)	2,689	25.9		
Labour	Douglas Hay	1,342	12.9		
Labour	Robert MacBean (Note: Outgoing councillor for Baillieston single-member ward.)	739	7.1		
Conservative	George Clark	678	6.5		
Solidarity	Michael Kayes	466	4.5		
Liberal Democrats	Marjory Watt	392	3.8		
SNP	David McDonald	250	2.4		
Scottish Socialist	Jim McVicar	224	2.2		
Scottish Unionist	Ian Dickie	216	2.1		
Green	Raymond Morrison	181	1.7		

== See also ==
- Wards of Glasgow
