= Victoria Park (ward) =

Electoral ward in Glasgow, Scotland

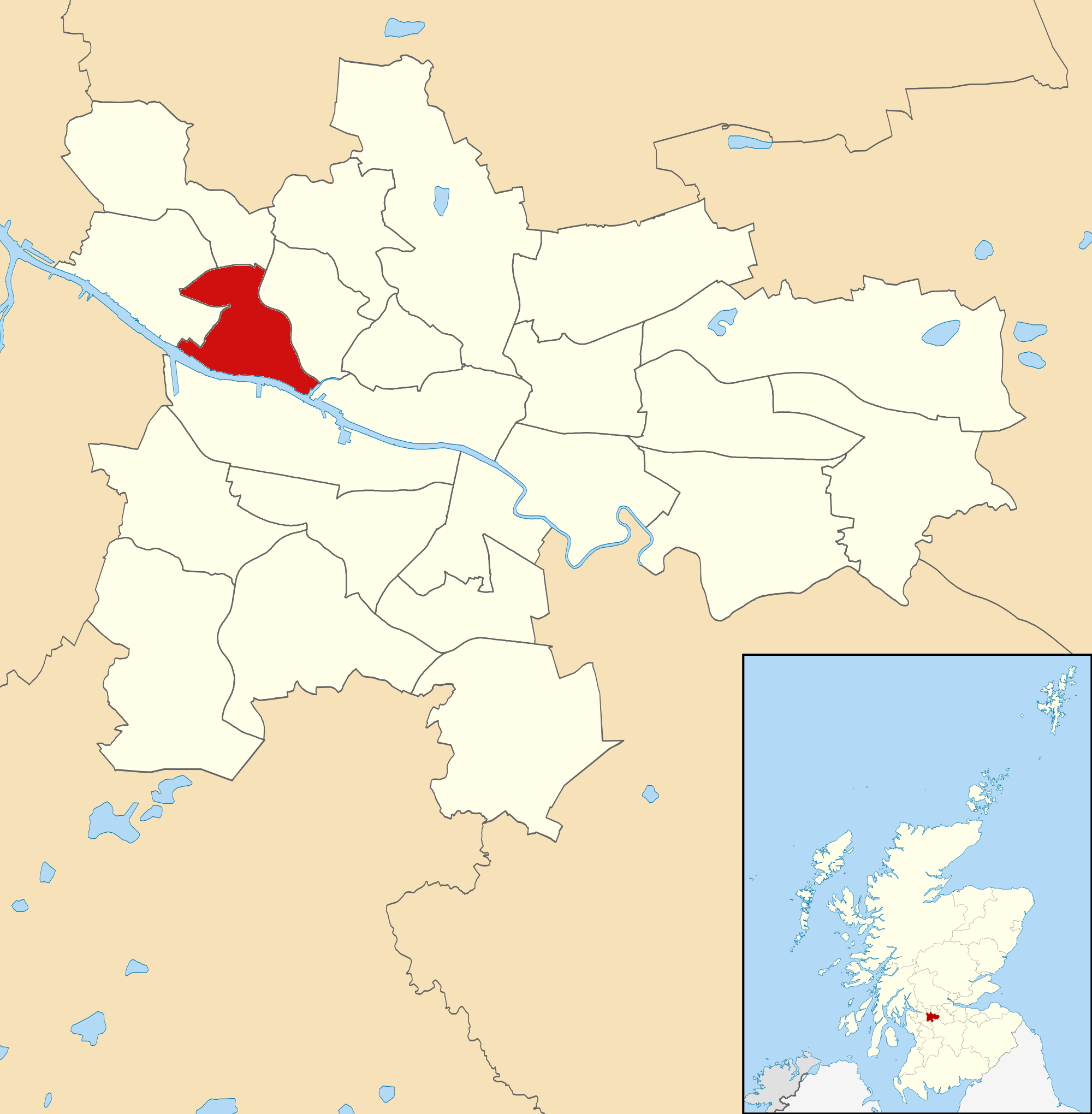
- Victoria Park Ward (2017) within Glasgow

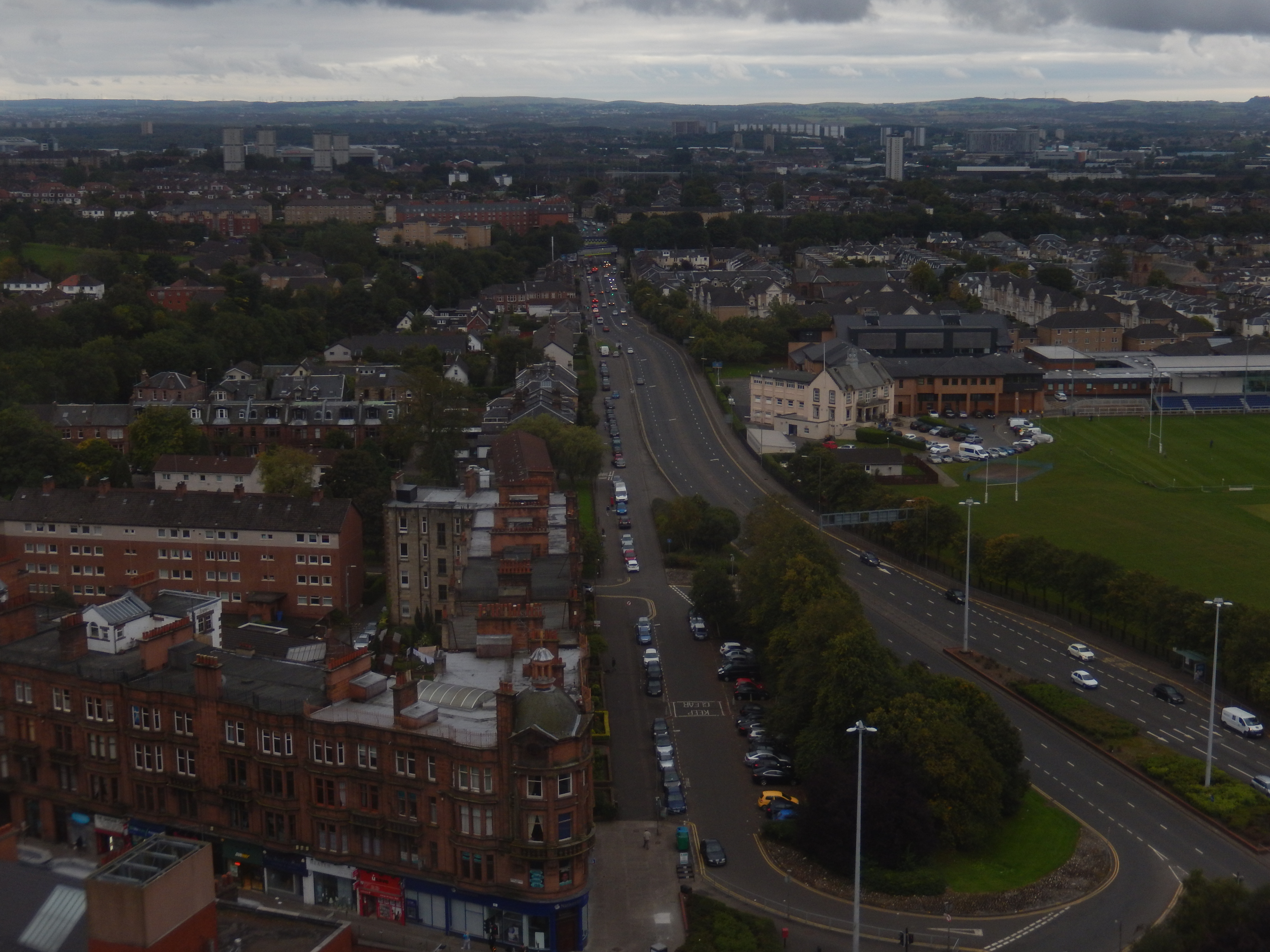
- View looking south down Crow Road towards the Victoria Park ward (2015)
- Area: 4.41 km^{2} (1.70 sq mi)
- Population: 20,950 (2015)
  - Density: 4,750.6/sq mi (1,834.2/km^{2})
- Council area: Glasgow City Council
- Lieutenancy area: Glasgow
- Country: Scotland
- Sovereign state: United Kingdom
- Post town: GLASGOW
- Postcode district: G11, G13, G14
- Dialling code: 0141
- Police: Scotland
- Fire: Scottish
- Ambulance: Scottish

Victoria Park (Ward 12) is one of the 23 wards of Glasgow City Council. Created as Partick West in 2007 it returned four council members, using the single transferable vote system; the boundaries were unchanged in 2012. For the 2017 Glasgow City Council election, the boundaries were changed, the ward decreased in size and population, was re-named Victoria Park and returned three members.

== Boundaries ==
Located in the west of Glasgow, the core of the ward since its creation as Partick West in 2007 has been formed from the Broomhill, Thornwood, Jordanhill, Glasgow Harbour and Whiteinch neighbourhoods, along with a small part of Anniesland (south of Anniesland Road and west of the Argyle Line railway), and a small part of Partick (west of the Argyle/North Clyde Line railway), with the southern boundary being the River Clyde.

The 2017 changes removed all territory to the east of the railway lines: most of Partick and Partickhill, and part of Anniesland south of Great Western Road, which were added to a new Partick East/Kelvindale ward. With little of Partick now in the boundaries, a new name was adopted from Victoria Park which had been in part of the territory since its creation.

The ethnic makeup of the ward using the 2011 census population statistics was:

- 91.5% White Scottish / British / Irish / Other
- 6.3% Asian
- 1% Black (mainly African)
- 1.2% Mixed / Other Ethnic Group

== Councillors ==
Election	Councillors			
2007	Aileen Colleran (Labour)	Christopher Mason (Liberal Democrats)	Kenny McLean (SNP)	Stuart Clay (Green)
2012	Aileen Colleran (Labour)	Feargal Dalton (SNP)	Kenny McLean (SNP)	Martin Bartos (Green)
2017	Maggie McTernan (Labour)	Feargal Dalton (SNP)	Ade Aibinu (Conservative)	3 seats
2022	Eunis Jassemi (Labour)	Feargal Dalton (SNP)	Lana Reid-McConnell (Green)	3 seats

== Election results ==
=== 2022 ===
Victoria Park – 3 seats
Party	Candidate	FPv%	Count		
Party	Candidate	FPv%	1	2	3
Labour	Eunis Jassemi	28.4	2,447		
SNP	Feargal Dalton (incumbent)	26.6	2,291		
Green	Lana Reid-McConnell	23.4	2,016	2,102	2,200
Conservative	Ade Aibinu (incumbent)	15.8	1,364	1,419	1,422
Liberal Democrats	James Douglas Speirs	4.2	358	445	453
Alba	Mahmood Ullah	1.6	141	145	153
Electorate: 17,512 Valid: 8,617 Spoilt: 84 Quota: 2,155 Turnout: 49.7%

=== 2017 ===
Victoria Park – 3 seats
Party	Candidate	FPv%	Count						
Party	Candidate	FPv%	1	2	3	4	5	6	7
SNP	Feargal Dalton *	26.39%	2,248						
Conservative	Ade Aibinu	23.69%	2,018	2,019	2,022	2,148			
Labour	Maggie McTernan	19.97%	1,701	1,706	1,722	1,872	1,879	1,977	3,001
Green	Allan Faulds	13.50%	1,150	1,172	1,190	1,336	1,339	1,937	
SNP	Deirdre Parkinson	10.05%	856	936	941	961	962		
Liberal Democrats	James Douglas Speirs	5.78%	492	494	497				
TUSC	Matt McGrath	0.61%	52	52					
Electorate: 17,660 Valid: 8,517 Spoilt: 117 Quota: 2,130 Turnout: 48.9%

* = Sitting Councillor for Partick West ward.

=== 2012 ===
Partick West – 4 seats
Party	Candidate	FPv%	Count												
Party	Candidate	FPv%	1	2	3	4	5	6	7	8	9	10	11	12	13
Labour	Aileen Colleran (incumbent) (Note: On 2 October 2014, Colleran resigned from Scottish Labour amid fallout from that year's Scottish independence referendum. She continued to sit on the council as an independent.)	19.97%	1,884	1,885	1,890										
Green	Martin Bartos	14.71%	1,388	1,388	1,392	1,392	1,395	1,409	1,418	1,478	1,662	1,946			
SNP	Feargal Dalton	18.63%	1,757	1,757	1,758	1,758	1,759	1,760	1,767	1,776	1,813	1,913			
SNP	Kenny McLean (incumbent)	14.87%	1,403	1,403	1,403	1,403	1,405	1,410	1,421	1,434	1,479	1,538	1,553	1,575	1,813
Labour	Michael Shanks	12.13%	1,144	1,144	1,147	1,149	1,153	1,156	1,167	1,190	1,258	1,380	1,394	1,395	
Conservative	John Anderson	10.33%	974	977	979	979	995	1,017	1,041	1,041	1,161				
Liberal Democrats	James Paris	5.54%	523	525	526	526	532	534	540	540					
Scottish Socialist	Andrew Gray	1.19%	112	112	113	113	113	113	114						
Scottish Christian	Donald Williamson	0.96%	91	91	91	91	95	102							
UKIP	Stuart Maskell	0.68%	64	65	65	65	77								
Scottish Unionist	Catherine Findlay	0.43%	41	59	60	60									
Glasgow First	Nicholas Black	0.29%	27	27											
Scottish Unionist	Robert Findlay	0.27%	25												
Electorate: 25,686 Valid: 9,433 Spoilt: 198 Quota: 1,887 Turnout: 9,631 (37.50%)

=== 2007 ===
2007 Council election: Partick West
Party	Candidate	FPv%	Count						
Party	Candidate	FPv%	1	2	3	4	5	6	7
SNP	Kenny McLean	22.06	2,811						
Liberal Democrats	Christopher Mason (Note: Outgoing councillor for Jordanhill single-member ward.)	17.73	2,259	2,300	2,325	2,354	2,411	2,910	
Labour	Aileen Colleran (Note: Outgoing councillor for Partick single-member ward.)	16.47	2,099	2,115	2,128	2,150	2,199	2,275	2,316
Green	Stuart Clay	12.51	1,594	1,652	1,744	1,789	1,963	2,175	2,304
Labour	Irene Graham (Note: Outgoing councillor for Victoria Park single-member ward.)	13.33	1,699	1,716	1,732	1,741	1,785	1,866	1,920
Conservative	Richard Alan Sullivan	11.02	1,404	1,419	1,419	1,529			
Solidarity	Jimmy Ross	2.93	373	402	465	472			
Scottish Unionist	George Aytoun Atkinson	2.08	265	268	271				
Scottish Socialist	Andrew Gray	1.88	240	253					
Electorate: 23,574 Valid: 12,744 Spoilt: 197 Quota: 2,549 Turnout: 54.90%

== See also ==
- Wards of Glasgow
