= Dennistoun (ward) =

Electoral ward in Glasgow, Scotland

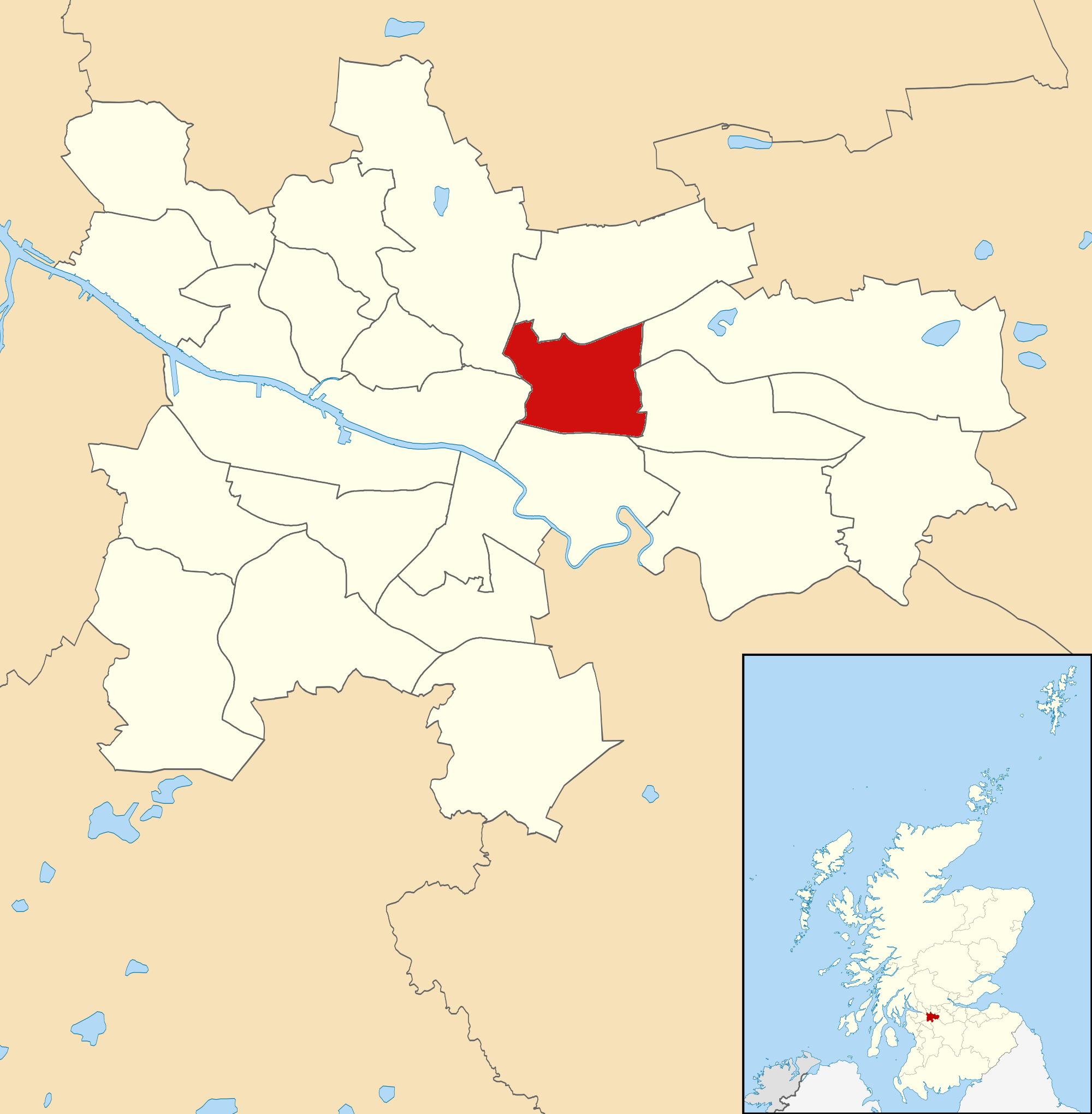
- Dennistoun Ward (2017) within Glasgow

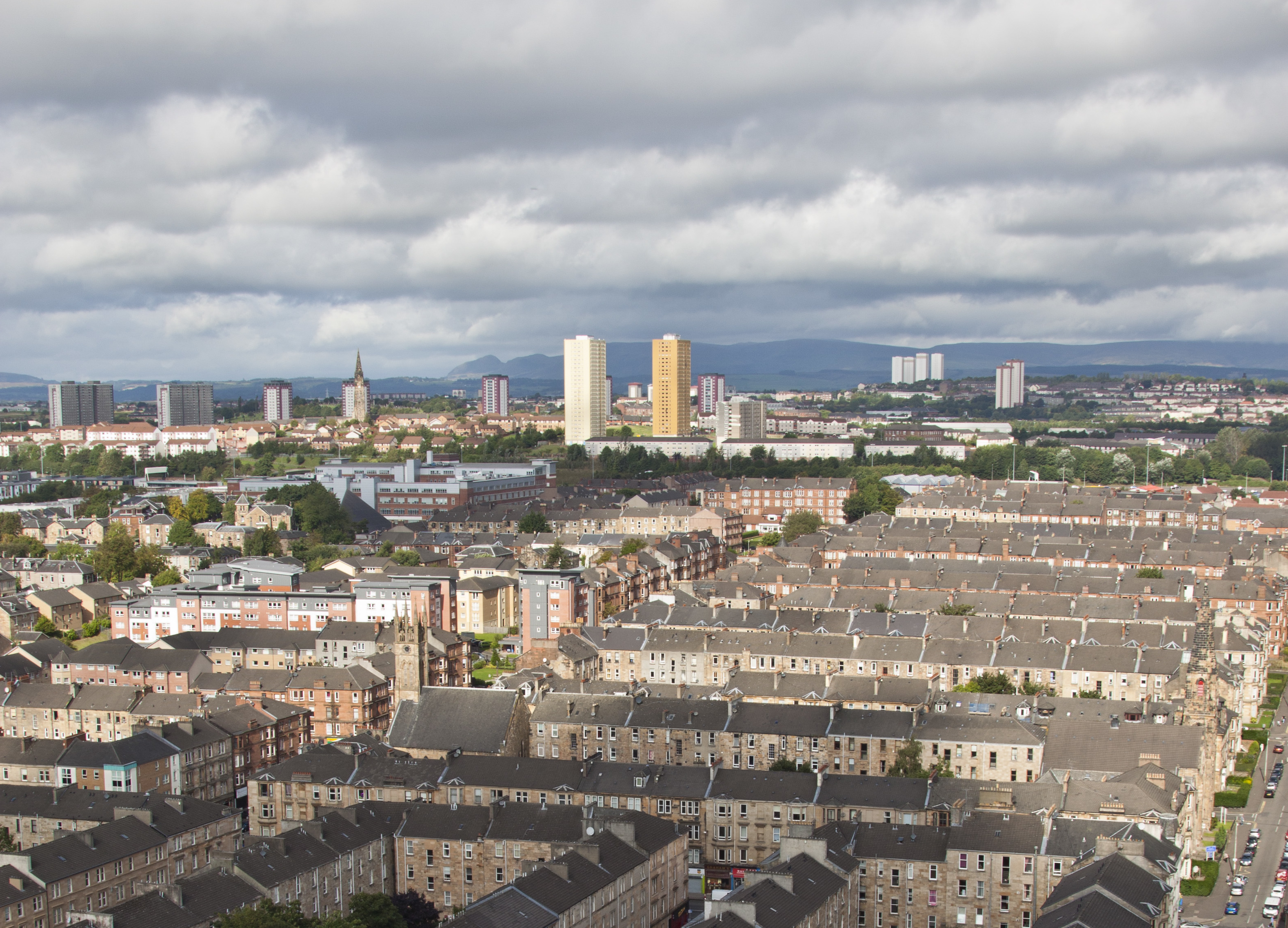
- Rooftop view looking north over Dennistoun with Royston beyond (2013)
- Area: 5.21 km^{2} (2.01 sq mi)
- Population: 20,861 (2015)
  - Density: 4,004/km^{2} (10,370/sq mi)
- Council area: Glasgow City Council
- Lieutenancy area: Glasgow
- Country: Scotland
- Sovereign state: United Kingdom
- Post town: GLASGOW
- Postcode district: G21, G31
- Dialling code: 0141
- Police: Scotland
- Fire: Scottish
- Ambulance: Scottish

Dennistoun (Ward 22) is one of the 23 wards of Glasgow City Council; used since the 2017 local election, it is one of two created from the Local Government Boundary Commission for Scotland's 5th Review. The ward returns three council members.

== Boundaries ==
Located east of Glasgow city centre, the ward is centred around Dennistoun, although does not include all of the district - the Reidvale streets to the south of Duke Street are within the Calton ward. It was created in 2017 from the East Centre ward (the Dennistoun, Milnbank and Haghill neighbourhoods), the Springburn ward (the Royston, Germiston and Sighthill neighbourhoods along with commercial/industrial land at Blochairn and St Rollox) and a small part of the Anderston/City ward (the Ladywell neighbourhood and the grounds of Glasgow Royal Infirmary).

== Councillors ==
Election	Councillors		
2017	Allan Casey (SNP)	Elaine McDougall (Labour)	Kim Long (Green)
2022	Allan Casey (SNP)	Elaine McDougall (Labour)	Anthony Carroll (Green)

== Election results ==
=== 2022 election ===
Dennistoun − 3 seats
Party	Candidate	FPv%	Count		
Party	Candidate	FPv%	1	2	3
Labour	Elaine McDougall (incumbent)	29.2	1,595		
Green	Anthony Carroll	26.1	1,431		
SNP	Allan Casey (incumbent)	24.5	1,337	1,362	1,388
SNP	Lorna Finn	10.7	582	609	626
Conservative	Fiona McNider Connelly	6.2	339	370	370
Liberal Democrats	Fergus McCann	1.8	96	143	148
TUSC	Oisín Duncan	1.5	84	109	117
Electorate: 15,386 Valid: 5,464 Spoilt: 154 Quota: 1,367 Turnout: 36.5%

=== 2017 election ===
Dennistoun – 3 seats
Party	Candidate	FPv%	Count						
Party	Candidate	FPv%	1	2	3	4	5	6	7
Labour	Elaine McDougall *	24.16%	1,310	1,336	1,677				
SNP	Allan Casey	24.41%	1,324	1,334	1,344	1,370			
Green	Kim Long	19.49%	1,057	1,100	1,107	1,160	1,162	1,258	1,781
SNP	Lorna Finn	14.38%	780	786	794	812	823	841	
Conservative	Michael Kusznir	7.78%	422	438	445	488	488		
Labour	Allan Stewart +	7.34%	398	405					
Liberal Democrats	Daniel Donaldson	2.45%	133						
Electorate: 15,471 Valid: 5,424 Spoilt: 228 Quota: 1,357 Turnout: 36.5%

- * = Sitting Councillor for East Centre ward.
- + = Sitting Councillor for Springburn ward.

== See also ==
- Wards of Glasgow
