= Maryhill (ward) =

Electoral ward in Glasgow, Scotland

Maryhill: Scottish Gaelic: Cnoc Mhoire; Scots: Maryhull
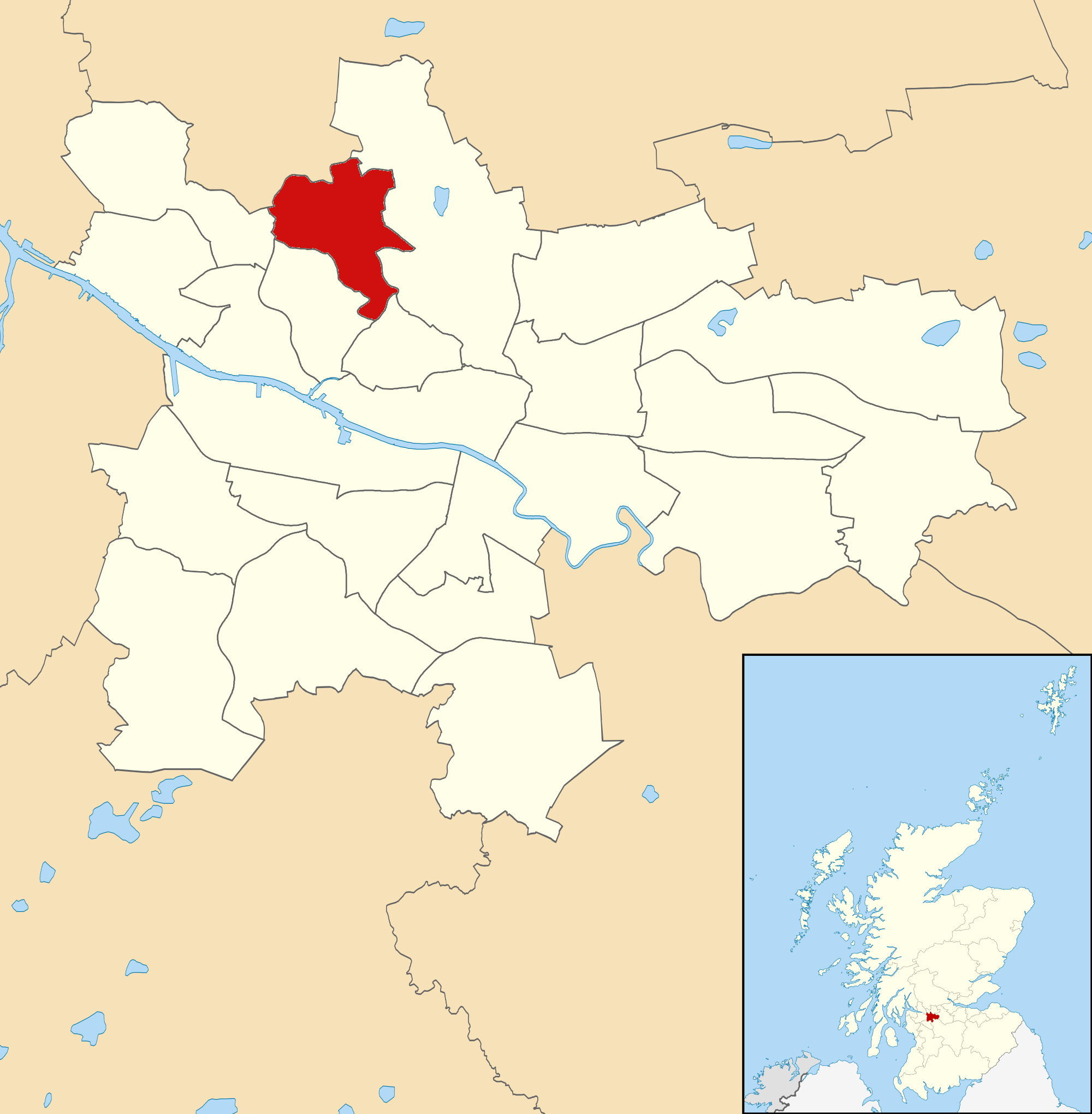
- Maryhill Ward (2017) within Glasgow

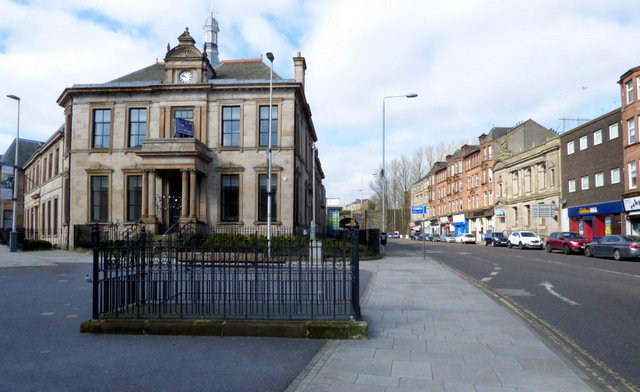
- Maryhill Burgh Hall within the ward
- Area: 4.99 km^{2} (1.93 sq mi)
- Population: 22,244 (2015)
  - Density: 4,457.7/km^{2} (11,545/sq mi)
- Council area: Glasgow City Council
- Lieutenancy area: Glasgow
- Country: Scotland
- Sovereign state: United Kingdom
- Post town: GLASGOW
- Dialling code: 0141
- Police: Scotland
- Fire: Scottish
- Ambulance: Scottish

Maryhill (Ward 15) is one of the 23 wards of Glasgow City Council. It was created in 2007 as Maryhill/Kelvin, and in that election it returned four council members, using the single transferable vote system. The same boundaries were used in 2012. For the 2017 Glasgow City Council election, the boundaries were changed, the ward substantially decreased in territory and population, was renamed Maryhill and returned three members.

== Boundaries ==
Located in the far north of Glasgow with East Dunbartonshire to the north, the ward includes the former burgh of Maryhill (and the Wyndford housing estate) between the River Kelvin to the west and the Port Dundas branch of the Forth and Clyde Canal to the east, as well as the Maryhill Park, Summerston, Gilshochill, Acre and Dawsholm neighbourhoods to the north of the main canal.

The 2017 changes removed the Cadder neighbourhood which was assigned to Canal ward (along with a large area around Balmore Road which is almost uninhabited); part of North Kelvinside (streets to the north-west of Queen Margaret Drive, which now forms Maryhill's southern boundary) was added from the same ward. Kelvindale and Kelvinside were removed and assigned to a new Partick East/Kelvindale ward.

The ethnic makeup of the Maryhill ward using the 2011 census population statistics was:

- 91.2% White Scottish / British / Irish / Other
- 4.9% Asian (mainly Chinese)
- 3% Black (mainly African)
- 0.8% Mixed / Other Ethnic Group

== Councillors ==
Election	Councillors			
2007	Mary Paris (Liberal Democrats)	Robert Winter (Labour)	Alex Dingwall (SNP/ Liberal Democrats)	Mohammed Razaq (Labour)
2010	Mary Paris (Liberal Democrats)	Robert Winter (Labour)	Alex Dingwall (SNP/ Liberal Democrats)	Mohammed Razaq (Labour)
2012	John Letford (SNP/ Alba)	Martin Rhodes (Labour)	Franny Scally (SNP)	Mohammed Razaq (Labour)
2017	John Letford (SNP/ Alba)	Jane Morgan (Labour)	Franny Scally (SNP)	3 seats
2021	John Letford (SNP/ Alba)	Jane Morgan (Labour)	Franny Scally (SNP)	3 seats
2022	Abdul Bostani (SNP)	Keiran O'Neill (Labour)	Franny Scally (SNP)	3 seats
2024	Abdul Bostani (SNP)	Marie Garrity (Labour)	Franny Scally (SNP)	3 seats

== Election results ==
=== 2024 By-election ===
Maryhill by-election (21 November 2024) − 1 seat
Party	Candidate	FPv%	Count						
Party	Candidate	FPv%	1	2	3	4	5	6	7
Labour	Marie Garrity	35.9	999	1,013	1,043	1,057	1,163	1,258	1,731
SNP	Lorna Margaret Finn	29.2	814	817	820	868	1,052	1,093	
Reform	David Jamie McGowan	12.7	353	360	384	398	410		
Green	Ellie Gomersall	12.1	338	352	357	372			
Alba	Nick Durie	4.2	118	121	127				
Conservative	Susan McCourt	3.2	89	100					
Liberal Democrats	Daniel John O'Malley	2.7	75						
Electorate: 14,619 Valid: 2,786 Spoilt: 40 Quota: 1,394 Turnout: 19.3%

=== 2022 Election ===
2022 Glasgow City Council election

Maryhill − 3 seats
Party	Candidate	FPv%	Count						
Party	Candidate	FPv%	1	2	3	4	5	6	7
Labour	Keiran O'Neill	26.9	1,523						
SNP	Franny Scally (incumbent)	22.6	1,279	1,285	1,289	1,301	1,313	1,384	1,686
SNP	Abdul Bostani	19.5	1,106	1,110	1,110	1,121	1,132	1,166	1,481
Green	Amy Irene Marquez	12.3	696	699	704	737	779	908	
Conservative	Heather MacLeod	8.2	463	467	479	499			
Labour	Gwen Farrell Wall	7.1	402	481	489	523	720		
Liberal Democrats	Derek Dunnington	2.4	136	138	150				
Freedom Alliance (UK)	Damian Matthew Clark	1.0	58	58					
Electorate: 15,292 Valid: 5,663 Spoilt: 201 Quota: 1,416 Turnout: 38.3%

=== 2017 Election ===
2017 Glasgow City Council election

Maryhill – 3 seats
Party	Candidate	FPv%	Count					
Party	Candidate	FPv%	1	2	3	4	5	6
SNP	John Letford *	24.75%	1,418	1,439				
Labour	Jane Morgan	21.12%	1,210	1,277	1,277	1,618		
SNP	Franny Scally *	22.95%	1,315	1,328	1,332	1,359	1,387	1,758
Conservative	Jane Burge	10.58%	606	646	646	665	695	743
Green	Michael Herrigan	8.81%	505	562	562	585	617	
Labour	Mohammed Razaq *	7.33%	421	445	445			
Liberal Democrats	Alex Dingwall	4.45%	255					
Electorate: 15,247 Valid: 5,730 Spoilt: 206 Quota: 1,433 Turnout: 38.9%

* = Sitting Councillors for Maryhill/Kelvin ward.

=== 2012 Election ===
2012 Glasgow City Council election

Maryhill/Kelvin – 4 seats
Party	Candidate	FPv%	Count							
Party	Candidate	FPv%	1	2	3	4	5	6	7	8
Labour	Martin Rhodes	23.6%	1,792							
SNP	John Letford	23.2%	1,761							
Labour	Mohammed Razaq (incumbent)	16.0%	1,215	1,425	1,436	1,466	1,509	1,652		
SNP	Franny Scally	11.2%	854	863	1,044	1,073	1,098	1,260	1,283	1,574
Liberal Democrats	Alex Dingwall (incumbent)	9.2%	703	715	724	733	1,007	1,217	1,236	
Green	Steen Parish	7.3%	555	564	580	645	716			
Conservative	Euan Erskine	7.7%	582	585	589	593				
Scottish Socialist	Liam Turbett	1.9%	143	146	148					
Electorate: 22,610 Valid: 7,605 Spoilt: 179 Quota: 1,522 Turnout: 34.43%

=== 2007 Election ===
2007 Glasgow City Council election

2007 Council election: Maryhill/Kelvin
Party	Candidate	FPv%	Count					
Party	Candidate	FPv%	1	2	3	4	5	6
SNP	Alex Dingwall†††	25.87	2,561					
Labour	Bob Winter (Note: Outgoing councillor for Summerston single-member ward.)	19.67	1,948	1,989				
Liberal Democrats	Mary Paris (Note: Outgoing councillor for Kelvindale single-member ward.)	16.18	1,602	1,692	1,693	1,728	1,808	2,212
Labour	Mohammed Razaq (Note: Outgoing councillor for Maryhill single-member ward.)	15.61	1,546	1,591	1,596	1,631	1,710	1,855
Conservative	Brian Clifford Pope	9.52	943	978	978	985	994	1,058
Green	Daryl L Tayar	7.12	705	781	782	863	981	
Solidarity	Paul Wilcox	3.44	341	402	473			
Scottish Socialist	John Lawson	2.58	255	319	320			
Electorate: 21,630 Valid: 9,901 Spoilt: 177 Quota: 1,981 Turnout: 46.59%

== See also ==
- Wards of Glasgow
