= Springburn/Robroyston (ward) =

Electoral ward in Glasgow, Scotland

Springburn/Robroyston: Scottish Gaelic: Allt an Fhuairain / Baile Raibeart Ruadh
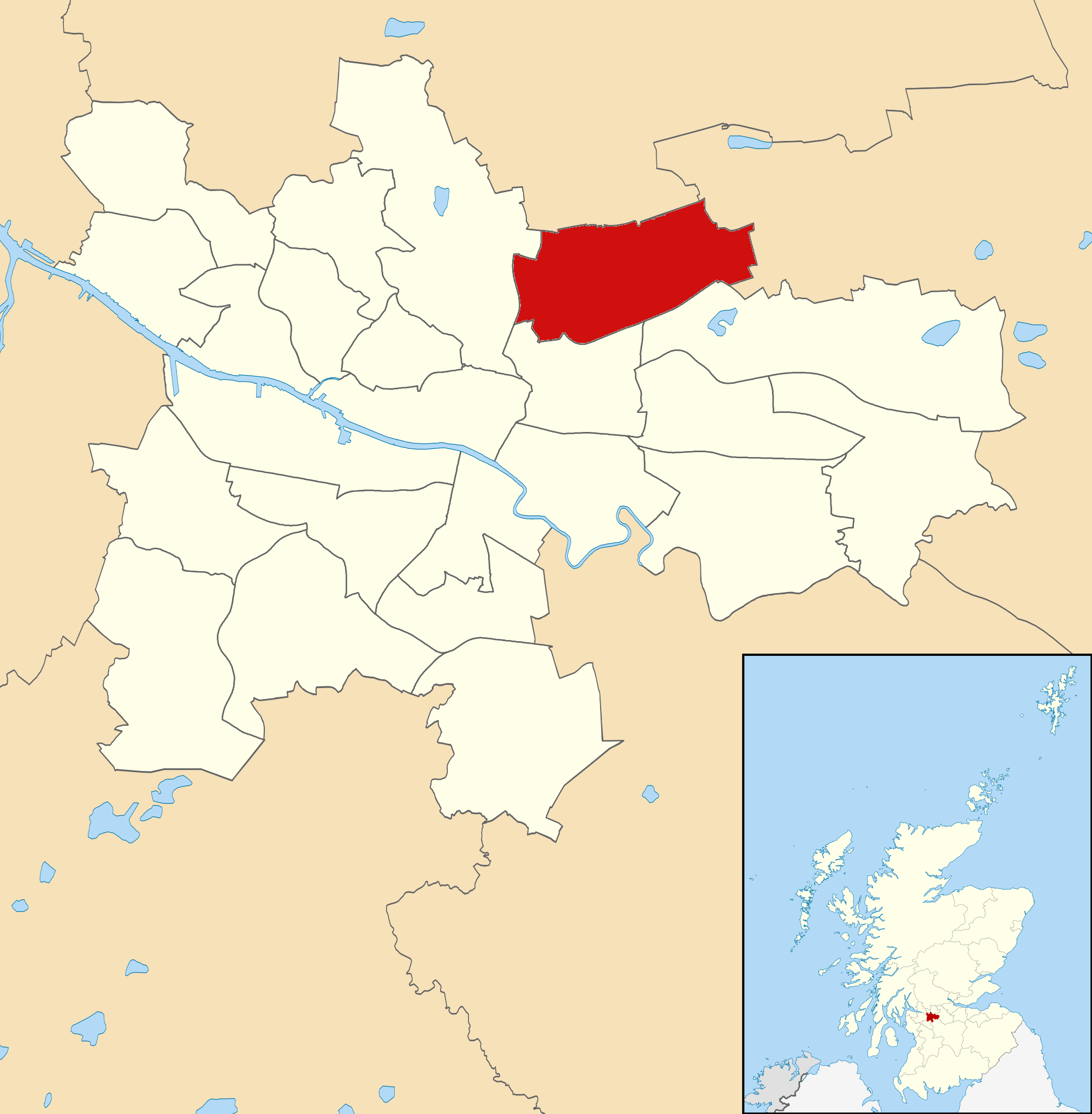
- Springburn/Robroyston Ward (2017) within Glasgow

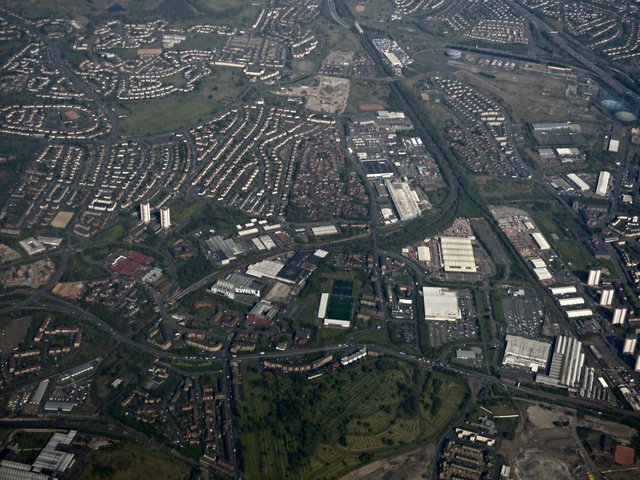
- Aerial view looking east over Springburn (2017)
- Area: 9.50 km^{2} (3.67 sq mi)
- Population: 27,237 (2015)
  - Density: 2,867/km^{2} (7,430/sq mi)
- Council area: Glasgow City Council
- Lieutenancy area: Glasgow
- Country: Scotland
- Sovereign state: United Kingdom
- Post town: GLASGOW
- Postcode district: G21, G33, G64
- Dialling code: 0141
- Police: Scotland
- Fire: Scottish
- Ambulance: Scottish

Springburn/Robroyston (Ward 17) is one of the 23 wards of Glasgow City Council. Created as Springburn, in 2007 and in 2012 it returned three council members, using the single transferable vote system. For the 2017 Glasgow City Council election, the boundaries were changed, the ward increased in size and population (the latter by 20%), was renamed Springburn/Robroyston and returned four members.

== Boundaries ==
Located in the north of Glasgow, the original core of the ward centred around the district of Springburn (including the neighbourhoods of Stobhill, Old Balornock, Petershill and Balgrayhill), as well as part of Cowlairs (streets to the east of the Glasgow to Edinburgh via Falkirk Line railway tracks which form the ward's western boundary), and part of Colston (streets to the east of Springburn Road and south of Colston Road - north of this belongs to the adjoining town of Bishopbriggs in East Dunbartonshire which forms the northern boundary).

The 2017 changes were substantial: the southern boundary was moved north from the M8 motorway to the Cumbernauld Line railway, with the Royston, Germiston and Sighthill neighbourhoods assigned to a new Dennistoun ward along with commercial/industrial land at Blochairn and St Rollox. However, territory further east was reassigned from the North East ward into the Springburn ward, which was renamed as a result: Robroyston, Barmulloch, Wallacewell, Balornock and the streets in Millerston within Glasgow were all added; the eastern boundary is now with North Lanarkshire.

== Councillors ==
Election	Councillors			
2007	Allan Stewart (Labour)	James Todd (Labour)	Phil Greene (SNP)	3 seats
2012	Allan Stewart (Labour)	Gilbert Davidson (Labour)	Phil Greene (SNP)	3 seats
2017	Martin McElroy (Labour)	Aileen McKenzie (Labour)	Graham Campbell (SNP)	Christina Cannon (SNP)
2022	Audrey Dempsey (Reform UK)	Thomas Rannachan (Labour)	Graham Campbell (SNP)	Christina Cannon (SNP)

== Election results ==
=== 2022 election ===
2022 Glasgow City Council election

Springburn/Robroyston − 4 seats
Party	Candidate	FPv%	Count					
Party	Candidate	FPv%	1	2	3	4	5	6
Labour	Audrey Dempsey	32.2	2,184					
SNP	Graham Campbell (incumbent)	24.9	1,690					
SNP	Christina Cannon (incumbent)	16.3	1,109	1,149	1,439			
Labour	Thomas Rannachan	9.6	650	1,282	1,290	1,302	1,323	1,379
Conservative	Richard Johnson	9.0	614	643	643	644	649	671
Green	Madeleine Guthrie	4.2	288	308	319	348	383	443
Liberal Democrats	Peter Davies	2.1	143	162	166	170	181	
Alba	Farah Hamid	1.6	112	120	122	128		
Electorate: 19,948 Valid: 6,790 Spoilt: 252 Quota: 1,359 Turnout: 35.3%

=== 2017 election ===
2017 Glasgow City Council election

Springburn/Robroyston – 4 seats
Party	Candidate	FPv%	Count								
Party	Candidate	FPv%	1	2	3	4	5	6	7	8	9
Labour	Martin McElroy *	31.64%	2,080								
SNP	Graham Campbell	20.13%	1,323								
SNP	Christina Cannon	15.41%	1,013	1,037	1,043	1,049	1,058	1,059	1,160	1,619	
Labour	Aileen McKenzie	8.05%	529	1,135	1,135	1,140	1,167	1,190	1,237	1,256	1,328
Conservative	Euan McHardy	10.36%	681	709	709	712	727	769	790	797	806
SNP	Paul McCabe	7.52%	494	502	503	505	508	513	534		
Green	Anthony Carroll	3.44%	226	241	242	255	268	287			
UKIP	Robb MacLean	1.59%	105	112	112	114	120				
Liberal Democrats	Robert Sykes	1.29%	85	90	90	91					
TUSC	Dave Semple	0.55%	36	37	37						
Electorate: 19,554 Valid: 6,572 Spoilt: 300 Quota: 1,315 Turnout: 35.1%

* = Sitting Councillor for Hillhead ward.

=== 2012 election ===
2012 Glasgow City Council election

Springburn – 3 seats
Party	Candidate	FPv%	Count								
Party	Candidate	FPv%	1	2	3	4	5	6	7	8	9
Labour	Gilbert Davidson	40.5	1,643								
Labour	Allan Stewart (incumbent)	17.2	699	1,184.4							
SNP	Phil Greene (incumbent)	21.9	888	932.6	948	949	951.1	960.4	971.1	978.5	1,039.5
SNP	James Oakes	8.1	330	342.6	349.7	351.8	353.9	355.5	372.8	384.9	419.8
Independent	Joe Chambers	5.9	240	257.2	273.	278.9	283.1	295.2	316.5	343.3	
Conservative	Jason Eccles	2.7	111	115.9	120.6	120.6	122.1	134.2	139.3		
Green	John Stuart	1.5	61	65.6	76.8	87.6	92.1	101			
Liberal Democrats	Sophie Bridger	1.1	45	49.6	53.9	53.9	61.5				
Glasgow First	Christopher Henderson	0.5	21	28.3	35.8	36.1					
TUSC	Luke Ivory	0.5	22	24.3	26.9						
Electorate: 15,717 Valid: 4,060 Spoilt: 191 Quota: 1,016 Turnout: 4,251 (27.05%)

=== 2007 election ===
2007 Glasgow City Council election

2007 Council election: Springburn
Party	Candidate	FPv%	Count	
Party	Candidate	FPv%	1	2
Labour	Allan Stewart (Note: Outgoing councillor for Cowlairs single-member ward.)	32.38	1,752	
SNP	Phil Greene	24.03	1,300	1,437
Labour	James Todd (Note: Outgoing councillor for Springburn single-member ward.)	21.98	1,189	1,327
Solidarity	Graham Campbell	6.27	339	351
Conservative	Graeme Dickson	3.20	173	176
Liberal Democrats	John H Stuart	3.11	168	176
Green	Patrick McAleer	2.48	134	140
Scottish Socialist	Margaret Bean	2.50	135	139
BNP	Kenny Smith	2.50	135	137
Scottish Unionist	Robert G. C. Sawers	1.57	85	86
Electorate: 15,496 Valid: 5,410 Spoilt: 235 Quota: 1,353 Turnout: 43.60%

== See also ==
- Wards of Glasgow
