= Wallacewell =

District in Glasgow, Scotland

Coordinates: 55.883544°N 4.206162°W

- Suburb
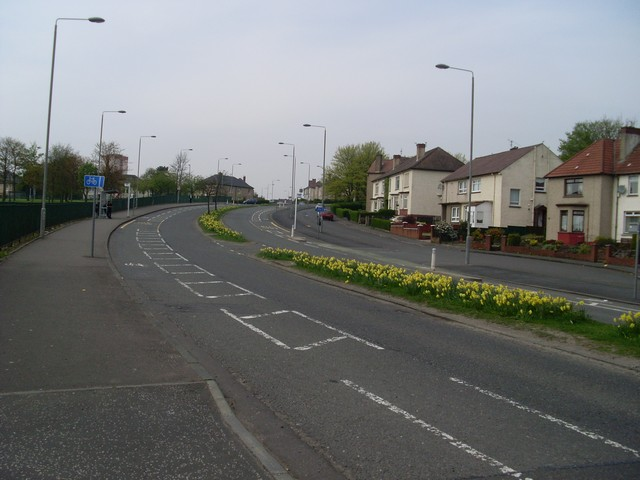
- Wallacewell Road

- Location within Glasgow
- OS grid reference: NS621678
- Council area: Glasgow City Council
- Lieutenancy area: Glasgow
- Country: Scotland
- Sovereign state: United Kingdom
- Post town: GLASGOW
- Postcode district: G21
- Dialling code: 0141
- Police: Scotland
- Fire: Scottish
- Ambulance: Scottish
- UK Parliament: Glasgow North East
- Scottish Parliament: Glasgow Provan

Wallacewell is a suburban area of the city of Glasgow, Scotland.

== Public services ==
- Wallacewell Primary School
- Wallacewell Medical Centre

== Religious sites ==
- Wallacewell Church

== Politics ==
Wallacewell is governed by Glasgow City Council. It is part of the Glasgow North East constituency for the UK Parliament, and the Glasgow Provan constituency for the Scottish Parliament.

In 2017, Wallacewell was moved from the North East ward to the Springburn/Robroyston ward.

== See also ==
- Wallace's Well
