= Haghill =

Coordinates: 55.860201°N 4.204838°W

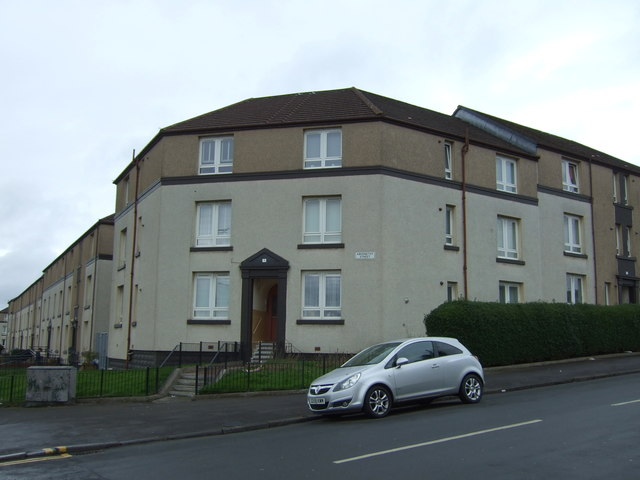
- Typical tenement block on Abernethy Street

- Location within Glasgow
- OS grid reference: NS621652
- Council area: Glasgow City Council
- Lieutenancy area: Glasgow
- Country: Scotland
- Sovereign state: United Kingdom
- Post town: GLASGOW
- Postcode district: G31
- Dialling code: 0141
- Police: Scotland
- Fire: Scottish
- Ambulance: Scottish
- UK Parliament: Glasgow North East
- Scottish Parliament: Glasgow Provan

Haghill is a residential neighbourhood in Glasgow, Scotland. It is situated in the east end of the city, north of the River Clyde. The housing includes tenements (from the 1900s and the 1930s), former council houses and several more recently constructed homes. It is bordered by Alexandra Park to the north (with Riddrie beyond), Carntyne to the east, Dennistoun to the west and Parkhead to the south. Administratively, it falls within the Dennistoun ward of Glasgow City Council since a 2017 boundary re-assessment, having been in the East Centre ward for the decade prior.

The red sandstone building of the local primary school sited off Walter Street, which opened in 1904 and closed a century later, was still standing in 2020 but had been allowed to fall into a state of dilapidation; following a partial roof collapse in 2021, its demolition became necessary.

Glasgow Kelvin College has a modern campus in Haghill, located off Duke Street. The district sports centre (Glasgow Club Haghill) is on the area's other main thoroughfare, Cumbernauld Road (a continuation of Alexandra Parade), along with Parkhill Secondary School – once known as Kennyhill School – a facility for children with special educational needs.

Alexandra Parade and Duke Street railway stations are both located immediately west of Haghill; the tracks of the North Clyde Line on which both stations lie is generally considered to form the boundary with Dennistoun. Several buses run along both roads between Glasgow city centre and its eastern suburbs.
