= Partick East/Kelvindale (ward) =

Electoral ward in Glasgow, Scotland

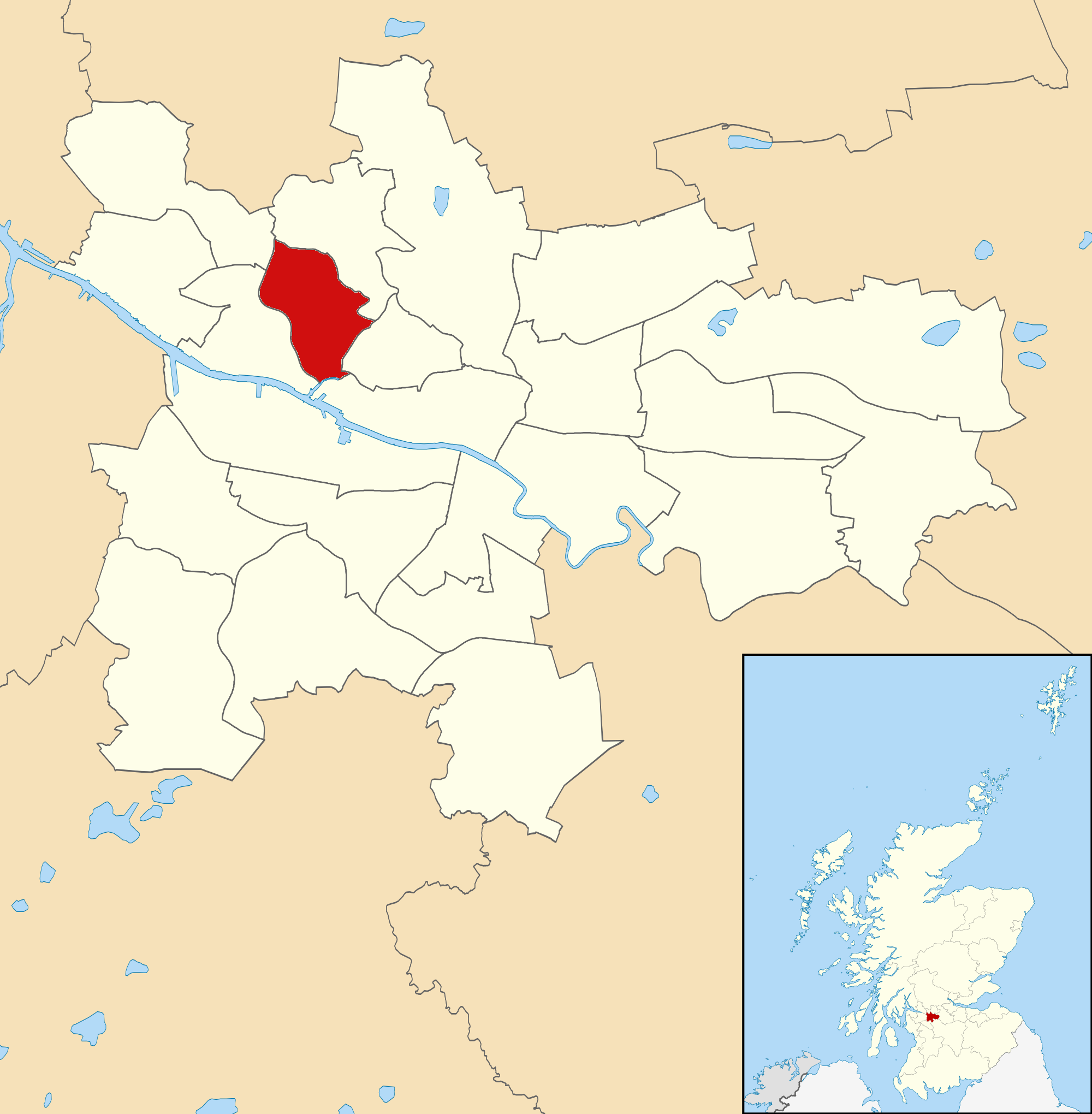
- Partick East/Kelvindale Ward (2017) within Glasgow

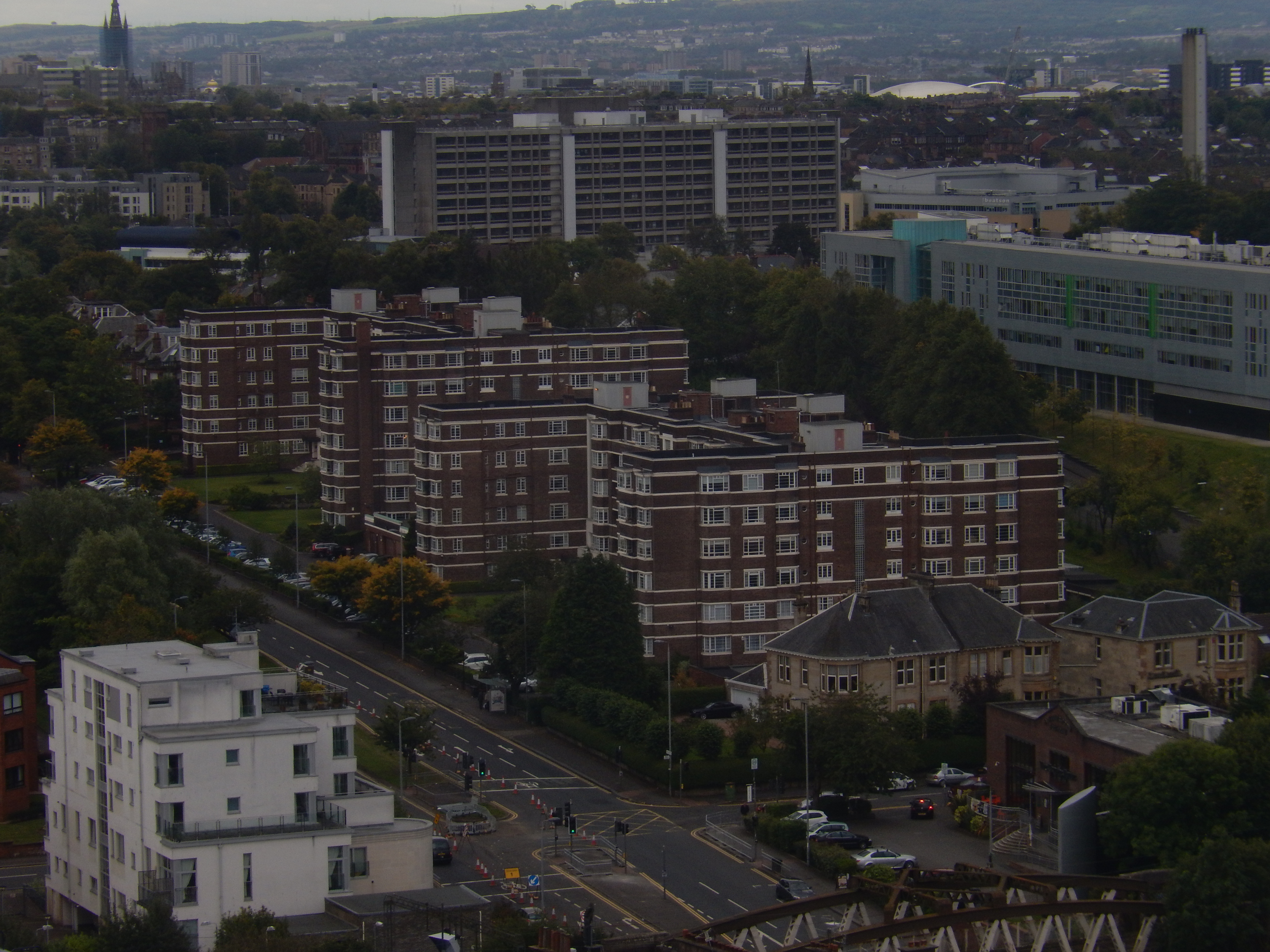
- View looking west over Great Western Road and Gartnavel General Hospital within Partick East/Kelvindale ward
- Area: 3.91 km^{2} (1.51 sq mi)
- Population: 28,914 (2015)
  - Density: 7,394.9/km^{2} (19,153/sq mi)
- Council area: Glasgow City Council
- Lieutenancy area: Glasgow
- Country: Scotland
- Sovereign state: United Kingdom
- Post town: GLASGOW
- Postcode district: G11, G12
- Dialling code: 0141
- Police: Scotland
- Fire: Scottish
- Ambulance: Scottish

Partick East/Kelvindale (Ward 23) is one of the 23 wards of Glasgow City Council; used since the 2017 local election, it is one of two created from the Local Government Boundary Commission for Scotland's 5th Review. The ward returns four council members.

== Boundaries ==
Situated to the west of Glasgow city centre, the ward was formed from parts of the former wards (as they existed until 2017) of Hillhead, Partick West, and Maryhill/Kelvin. Its territory covers the areas of Kelvindale, Kelvinside, Dowanhill, Hyndland, Partickhill, part of Anniesland (streets to the east of the Argyle Line railway) and most of Partick (streets to the west and north of the Argyle/North Clyde Line railway). It is bordered to the north-east by parts of the River Kelvin and Forth and Clyde Canal and by Byres Road to the south-east. The railway lines run along its western side, including three stations; Anniesland, Hyndland, and Partick.

== Demographics ==
According to the 2011 census, the ethnicity of the population is:

Ethnicity	Proportion
White Scottish/British	80.15%
White Irish	2.71%
Other White	6.38%
Mixed Ethnic Groups	1.09%
Indian	2.08%
Pakistani	1.76%
Bangladeshi	0.14%
Chinese	2.88%
Other Asian	0.99%
African	0.73%
Caribbean or Black	0.35%
Other Ethnic Group	0.74%

== Councillors ==
Election	Councillors			
2017	Kenny McLean (SNP)	Martin Rhodes (Labour)	Tony Curtis (Conservative/ Independent)	Martin Bartos (Green/ Independent)
2020	Kenny McLean (SNP)	Martin Rhodes (Labour)	Tony Curtis (Conservative/ Independent)	Martin Bartos (Green/ Independent)
January 2021	Kenny McLean (SNP)	Martin Rhodes (Labour)	Vacant	Martin Bartos (Green/ Independent)
March 2021	Kenny McLean (SNP)	Martin Rhodes (Labour)	Jill Brown (Labour)	Martin Bartos (Green/ Independent)
May 2021	Kenny McLean (SNP)	Martin Rhodes (Labour)	Jill Brown (Labour)	Martin Bartos (Green/ Independent)
2022	Kenny McLean (SNP)	Lilith Johnstone (Labour)	Jill Brown (Labour)	Blair Anderson (Green)
December 2024	James Adams (Labour)	Lilith Johnstone (Labour)	Jill Brown (Labour)	Blair Anderson (Green)

== Election results ==
=== 2024 by-election ===
Partick East/Kelvindale by-election (5 December 2024) − 1 seat
Party	Candidate	FPv%	Count			
Party	Candidate	FPv%	1	2	3	4
Labour	James Adams	37.5	1,723	1,854	2,143	2,485
SNP	Cylina Porch	23.1	1,062	1,089	1,112	1,532
Green	Heloise Le Moal	18.2	837	870	927	
Conservative	Faten Hameed	13.7	632	707		
Liberal Democrats	Nicholas Budgen	7.4	339			
Electorate: 21,307 Valid: 4,593 Spoilt: 36 Quota: 2,297 Turnout: 21.7%

=== 2022 election ===
Partick East/Kelvindale − 4 seats
Party	Candidate	FPv%	Count								
Party	Candidate	FPv%	1	2	3	4	5	6	7	8	9
Labour	Jill Brown (incumbent)	28.7	2,939								
Green	Blair Anderson	20.9	2,138								
SNP	Kenny McLean (incumbent)	17.6	1,800	1,828	1,854	1,855	1,874	1,910	3,004		
Conservative	Naveed Asghar	13.3	1,364	1,400	1,401	1,424	1,429	1,515	1,519	1,535	
SNP	Linsey Wilson	10.8	1,101	1,112	1,139	1,140	1,162	1,182			
Liberal Democrats	Nicholas Moohan	3.8	388	424	431	440	451				
Labour	Lilith Johnstone	3.5	358	1,110	1,130	1,141	1,153	1,323	1,354	1,654	2,378
Alba	Udochukwu Kings Nwaokorobia	0.8	81	82	82	87					
Freedom Alliance (UK)	Di McMillan	0.6	62	64	65						
Electorate: 21,995 Valid: 10,231 Spoilt: 133 Quota: 2,047 Turnout: 47.1%

=== 2021 by-election ===
Conservative Cllr Tony Curtis resigned from the party in July 2020 in protest for the party's lack of support for the fitness industry. He then represented the council as an independent until his disqualification on 11 January 2021, after not attending council meetings for six months. A by-election for the seat was held on 18 March 2021. Labour candidate Jill Brown won the by-election.

Partick East/Kelvindale by-election (18 March 2021) - 1 seat
Party	Candidate	FPv%	Count				
Party	Candidate	FPv%	1	2	3	4	5
SNP	Abdul Bostani	32.08%	2,084	2,084	2,103	2,142	2,812
Labour	Jill Brown	28.26%	1,836	1,842	1,932	2,498	2,927
Green	Blair Anderson	18.47%	1,200	1,205	1,264	1,379	
Conservative	Naveed Ashgar	16.69%	1,084	1,092	1,148		
Liberal Democrats	Tahir Jameel	3.99%	259	260			
UKIP	Donald Mackay	0.51%	33				
Electorate: 22,163 Valid: 6,496 Spoilt: 51 Quota: 3,249 Turnout: 29.54%

=== 2017 election ===
Partick East/Kelvindale – 4 seats
Party	Candidate	FPv%	Count				
Party	Candidate	FPv%	1	2	3	4	5
SNP	Kenny McLean *	22.49%	2,366				
Conservative	Tony Curtis†††††††	22.12%	2,336				
Labour	Martin Rhodes +	17.57%	1,848	1,857	1,902	1,922	2,303
Green	Martin Bartos *	16.42%	1,727	1,763	1,779	1,812	2,148
SNP	Kaukab Stewart	11.80%	1,241	1,439	1,442	1,456	1,519
Liberal Democrats	Carole Ford	8.45%	889	894	974	1,009	
Independent	Tom Muirhead	1.04%	109	111	135		
Electorate: 21,691 Valid: 10,516 Spoilt: 80 Quota: 2,104 Turnout: 48.8%

- * = Sitting Councillors for Partick West ward.
- + = Sitting Councillor for Maryhill/Kelvin ward.
- In May 2021 Greens Cllr Martin Bartos resigned his party membership, while remaining as an independent councillor.

== See also ==
- Wards of Glasgow
