= Canal (ward) =

Electoral ward in Glasgow, Scotland

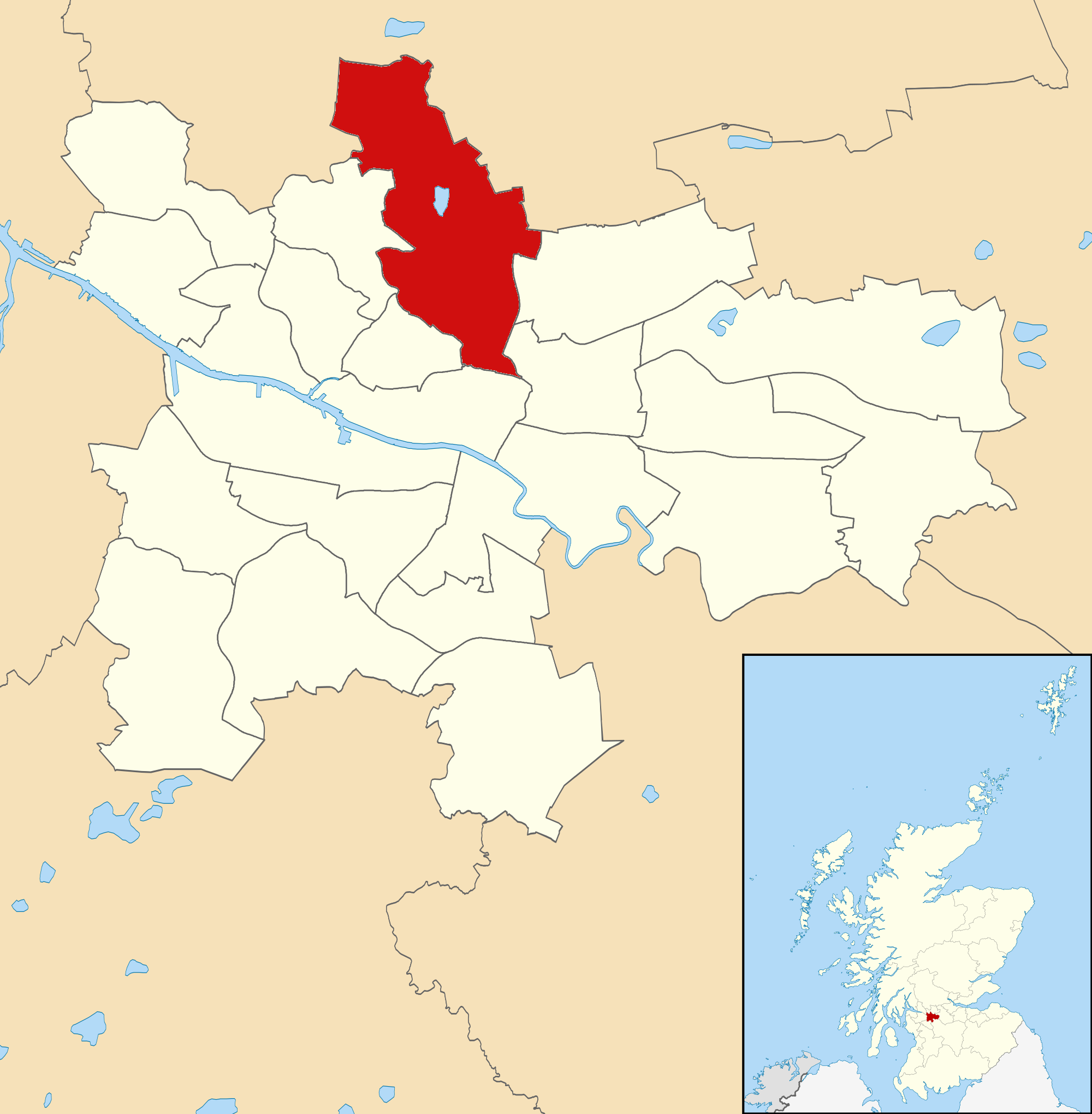
- Canal Ward (2017) within Glasgow

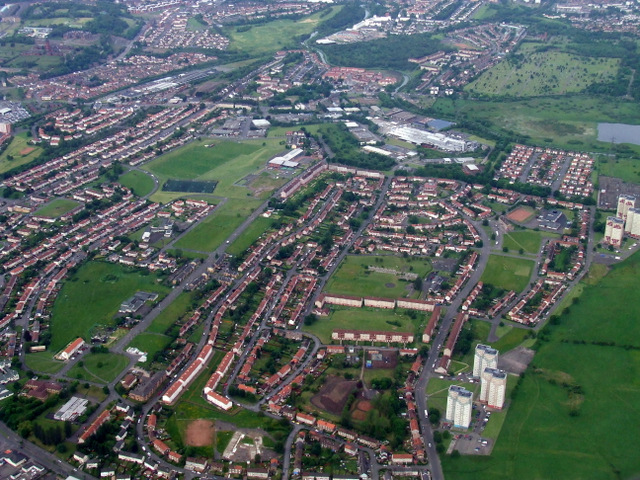
- Aerial view looking west over Milton which forms a large proportion of the Canal ward (2012)
- Area: 14.40 km^{2} (5.56 sq mi)
- Population: 25,000 (2015)
  - Density: 1,736/km^{2} (4,500/sq mi)
- Council area: Glasgow City Council
- Lieutenancy area: Glasgow
- Country: Scotland
- Sovereign state: United Kingdom
- Post town: GLASGOW
- Postcode district: G4, G21, G22, G23
- Dialling code: 0141
- Police: Scotland
- Fire: Scottish
- Ambulance: Scottish

Canal (Ward 16) is one of the 23 wards of Glasgow City Council. Since its creation in 2007 it has returned four council members, using the single transferable vote system. For the 2017 Glasgow City Council election, the boundaries were changed and the ward decreased in population, but continued to return four councillors.

== Boundaries ==
Located in the north of Glasgow, the ward includes Possilpark and Milton as well as Ruchill, Firhill, Hamiltonhill, Parkhouse, Lambhill, Port Dundas and part of Cowlairs, consisting of the streets to the west of the Glasgow to Edinburgh via Falkirk Line railway tracks which form the ward's eastern boundary (the exception is a small section of the Colston neighbourhood on the eastern side of the tracks which is included to Canal ward; however, this area is further divided with everything north of Colston Road belonging to the adjoining town of Bishopbriggs in East Dunbartonshire). The west boundary is the Port Dundas branch of the Forth and Clyde Canal, which gives the ward its name.

The 2017 changes added more territory west of the main canal (which was previously the boundary but now lies mostly within the ward), taking in the Cadder neighbourhood from the Maryhill/Kelvin ward, along with a large area around Balmore Road which is almost uninhabited. In contrast, the more densely populated North Kelvinside neighbourhood was reassigned to the Hillhead ward.

== Councillors ==
Election	Councillors			
2007	Kieran Wild (Greens)	Ellen Hurcombe (Labour)	Jim MacKechnie (Labour)	Billy McAllister (SNP/ Independent)
2012	Kieran Wild (Greens)	Chris Kelly (Labour)	Helen Stephen (Labour)	Billy McAllister (SNP/ Independent)
2016	Kieran Wild (Greens)	Chris Kelly (Labour)	Helen Stephen (Labour)	Billy McAllister (SNP/ Independent)
2017	Allan Gow (SNP)	Gary Gray (Labour)	Robert Mooney (Labour)	Jacqueline McLaren (SNP)
2022	Allan Gow (SNP)	Fiona Higgins (Labour)	Robert Mooney (Labour)	Jacqueline McLaren (SNP)

== Election results ==
=== 2022 election ===
2022 Glasgow City Council election

Canal − 4 seats
Party	Candidate	FPv%	Count									
Party	Candidate	FPv%	1	2	3	4	5	6	7	8	9	10
SNP	Allan Gow (incumbent)	25.4	1,470									
Labour	Fiona Higgins	23.5	1,363									
Independent	Brian Land	12.8	746	760	770	779	793	798	831	875	877	
Labour	Robert Mooney (incumbent)	11.9	690	698	851	871	888	899	1,036	1,087	1,089	1,418
SNP	Jacqueline McLaren (incumbent)	8.8	512	733	739	743	761	976	979	1,172		
Green	Seonad Mairi Hoy	5.6	322	344	351	367	377	399	410			
Conservative	Maria Wells	5.2	299	300	305	316	321	322				
SNP	Sandra Watson	3.9	226	251	252	256	268					
Alba	Martin Lawson Olu-Osagie	1.7	96	99	100	103						
Liberal Democrats	Scott Simpson	1.2	68	69	74							
Electorate: 19,686 Valid: 5,792 Spoilt: 346 Quota: 1,159 Turnout: 31.2%

=== 2017 election ===
2017 Glasgow City Council election

Canal – 4 seats
Party	Candidate	FPv%	Count										
Party	Candidate	FPv%	1	2	3	4	5	6	7	8	9	10	11
SNP	Allan Gow	29.93%	1,727										
Labour	Gary Gray	25.54%	1,474										
SNP	Jacqueline McLaren	12.48%	720	1,187									
Labour	Robert Mooney	8.98%	518	526	747	749	755	769	778	792	889	1,015	1,195
Conservative	Esme Clark	8.84%	510	516	529	529	531	538	556	561	583	636	
Independent	Billy McAllister (incumbent)	5.39%	311	332	343	346	353	359	371	389	449		
Green	Andrew Smith	4.77%	275	297	304	315	320	339	343	367			
TUSC	Angela McCormick	1.07%	62	69	77	78	84	87	94				
UKIP	Stuart Maskell	1.11%	64	67	73	73	73	74					
Liberal Democrats	Andrew Chamberlain	0.97%	56	57	61	62	63						
Independent	Amjad Mirza	0.94%	54	56	60	60							
Electorate: 19,137 Valid: 5,771 Spoilt: 327 Quota: 1,155 Turnout: 31.9%

=== 2012 election ===
2012 Glasgow City Council election

Canal – 4 seats
Party	Candidate	FPv%	Count											
Party	Candidate	FPv%	1	2	3	4	5	6	7	8	9	10	11	12
Labour	Chris Kelly (Note: On 21 November 2016, Kelly resigned from the council to take up a politically restricted position at HMRC. No by-election was called due to the resignation's proximity to the May 2017 elections.)	29.61%	1,869											
SNP	Billy McAllister (incumbent) (Note: McAllister resigned from the SNP and became an independent in April 2016, claiming that party leadership were intolerant to free speech.)	22.83%	1,441											
Labour	Helen Stephen	14.89%	940	1,424										
Green	Kieran Wild (incumbent)	9.27%	585	596	601	622	623	634	667	724	767	797	846	1,159
SNP	Gavin Roberts	8.44%	533	547	696	708	709	715	735	747	758	775	813	
Socialist Labour	Jim Berrington	4.29%	271	289	293	310	311	313	342	345	351	372		
Scottish Unionist	Brian Brown	3.91%	247	254	256	261	275	278	290	292	332			
Conservative	Margaret Walker	2.34%	148	151	151	154	157	160	160	184				
Liberal Democrats	Caroline Johnston	1.84%	116	119	121	126	126	127	129					
TUSC	Angela McCormick	1.70%	107	113	116	121	122	127						
Glasgow First	Fay Dornan	0.54%	34	36	38	41	43							
Scottish Unionist	Graham Nicholls	0.33%	21	24	25	27								
Electorate: 23,679 Valid: 6,312 Spoilt: 255 Quota: 1,263 Turnout: 27.73 %

=== 2007 election ===
2007 Glasgow City Council election

2007 Council election: Canal
Party	Candidate	FPv%	Count								
Party	Candidate	FPv%	1	2	3	4	5	6	7	8	9
SNP	Billy McAllister (Note: Outgoing councillor for Milton single-member ward.)	29.15	2,514								
Labour	Ellen Hurcombe (Note: Outgoing councillor for Ashfield single-member ward.)†††††††††††	22.74	1,961								
Labour	Jim MacKechnie (Note: Outgoing councillor for North Kelvin single-member ward.)	12.23	1,055	1,118	1,247	1,263	1,274	1,288	1,333	1,393	1,692
Green	Kieran Wild	8.15	703	793	797	809	819	887	929	1,115	1,157
Liberal Democrats	Norman Fraser	6.81	587	651	658	673	693	711	814	861	905
Labour	Haleema Malik (Note: Outgoing councillor for Firhill single-member ward.)	6.71	579	608	631	637	644	653	673	729	
Solidarity	Angela McCormick	4.93	425	544	553	567	584	648	660		
Conservative	David E Ledgerwood	3.92	338	358	361	368	451	453			
Scottish Socialist	Kirsteen Redpath	2.03	175	222	224	231	235				
Scottish Unionist	Brian Brown	2.24	193	214	217	225					
Independent	James Cruickshank	1.09	94	119	120						
Electorate: 22,344 Valid: 8,624 Spoilt: 264 Quota: 1,725 Turnout: 39.78%

== See also ==
- Wards of Glasgow
