= East Centre (Glasgow ward) =

Electoral ward in Glasgow, Scotland

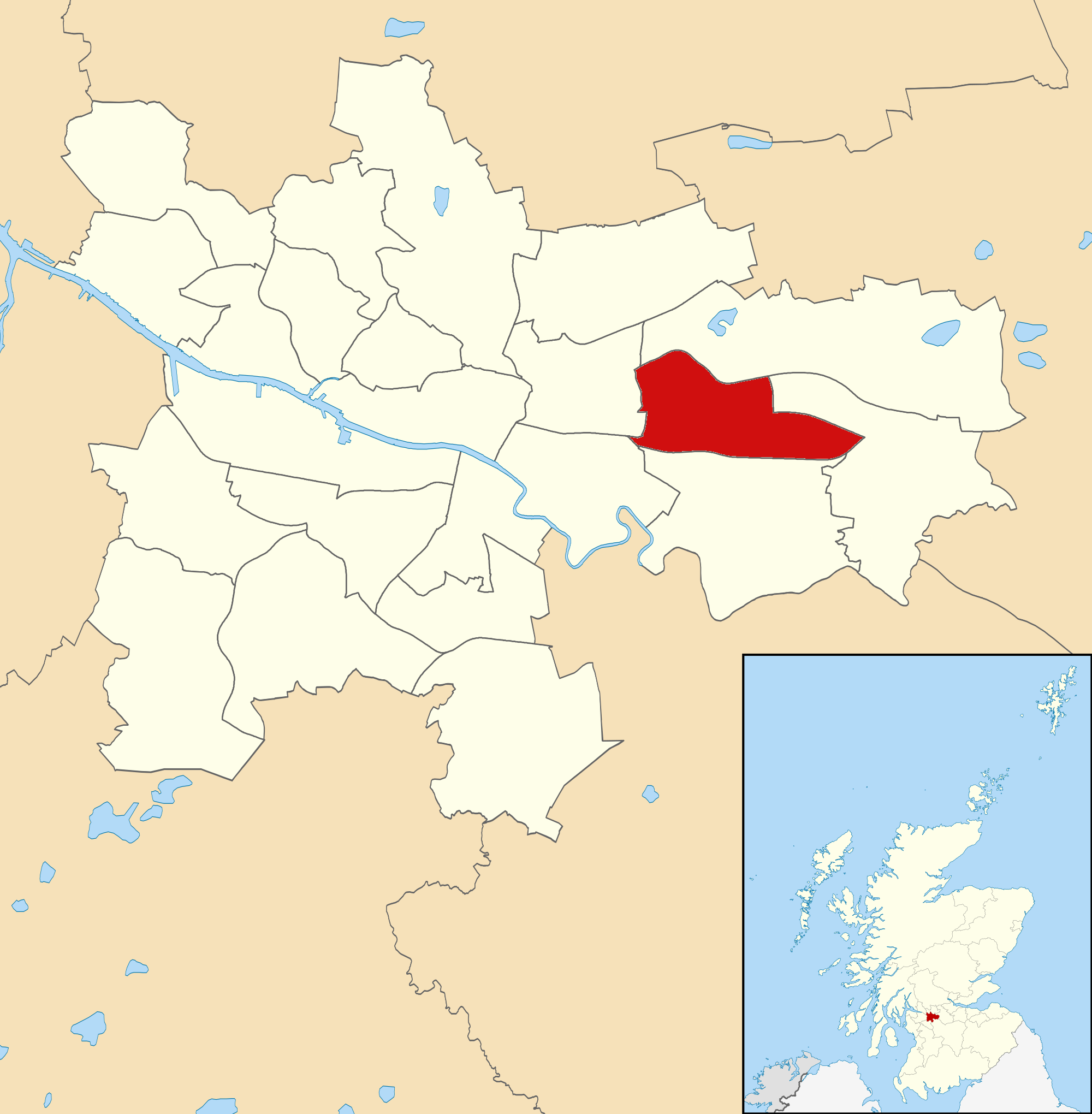
- East Centre Ward (2017) within Glasgow

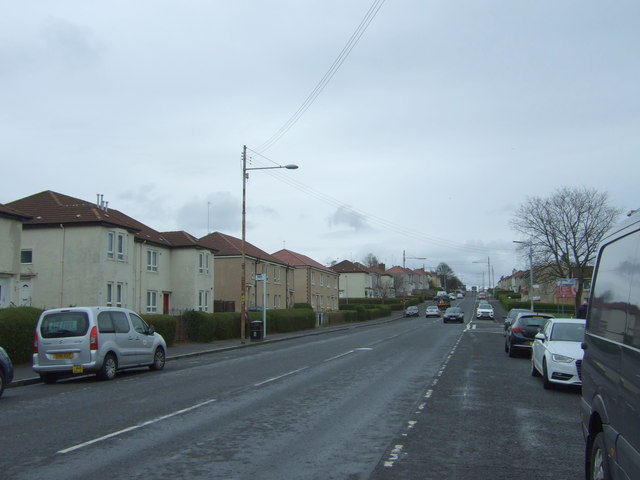
- Houses on Carntyne Road in the East Centre ward (2017)
- Area: 6.36 km^{2} (2.46 sq mi)
- Population: 27,991 (2015)
  - Density: 4,401/km^{2} (11,400/sq mi)
- Council area: Glasgow City Council
- Lieutenancy area: Glasgow
- Country: Scotland
- Sovereign state: United Kingdom
- Post town: GLASGOW
- Postcode district: G32, G33
- Dialling code: 0141
- Police: Scotland
- Fire: Scottish
- Ambulance: Scottish

East Centre (Ward 18) is one of the 23 wards of Glasgow City Council. On its creation in 2007 and in 2012 it returned four council members, using the single transferable vote system. For the 2017 Glasgow City Council election, the boundaries were changed, but four members were still returned.

== Boundaries ==
Located in the east of Glasgow, the core of the ward since 2007 includes Carntyne, Cranhill and Riddrie, with the northern boundary being the M8 motorway). The 2017 changes were substantial: the Dennistoun, Milnbank and Haghill neighbourhoods in the west of the original territory were removed and assigned to a new Dennistoun ward, whereas the neighbourhoods of Barlanark, Budhill, Greenfield, Lightburn and Springboig were added to East Centre from the Baillieston ward. The southern boundary is the North Clyde Line railway.

== Councillors ==
Election	Councillors			
2007	Patricia Chalmers (Labour)	Frank Docherty (Labour)	Elaine McDougall (Labour)	Jennifer Dunn (SNP)
2012	Russell Robertson (Labour/SNP/Independent)	Frank Docherty (Labour)	Elaine McDougall (Labour)	Jennifer Dunn (SNP)
2016	Russell Robertson (Labour/SNP/Independent)	Frank Docherty (Labour)	Elaine McDougall (Labour)	Jennifer Dunn (SNP)
2017	Russell Robertson (Labour/SNP/Independent)	Frank Docherty (Labour)	Marie Garrity (Labour)	Annette Christie (SNP)
2019	Russell Robertson (Labour/SNP/Independent)	Frank Docherty (Labour)	Marie Garrity (Labour)	Annette Christie (SNP)
2022	Declan Blench (SNP)	Ann Jenkins (Labour)	Kieran Turner (Labour)	Annette Christie (SNP)

== Election results ==
=== 2022 Election ===
2022 Glasgow City Council election

East Centre − 4 seats
Party	Candidate	FPv%	Count										
Party	Candidate	FPv%	1	2	3	4	5	6	7	8	9	10	11
Labour	Ann Jenkins	28.1	1,954										
SNP	Declan Blench	19.4	1,348	1,364	1,365	1,376	1,380	1,431					
SNP	Annette Christie (incumbent)	14.9	1,014	1,024	1,025	1,036	1,040	1,101	1,133	1,174	1,753		
Conservative	Faten Hameed	9.9	688	710	717	725	746	749	749	806	811	819	
Labour	Kieran Turner	9.2	642	1,046	1,064	1,074	1,102	1,149	1,150	1,238	1,259	1,328	1,719
SNP	Kilian Riley	8.2	568	573	573	586	588	635	639	656			
Independent	William McLachlan	3.6	249	265	271	286	299	318	319				
Green	Hannah Smith	3.5	240	249	266	281	293						
Alba	Tony Osy	1.5	101	102	106								
Liberal Democrats	Ruth Lindsay	1.3	90	109	113	117							
TUSC	Matt Dobson	0.9	63	68									
Electorate: 20,113 Valid: 6,957 Spoilt: 268 Quota: 1,392 Turnout: 35.9%

=== 2017 Election ===
2017 Glasgow City Council election

East Centre – 4 seats
Party	Candidate	FPv%	Count								
Party	Candidate	FPv%	1	2	3	4	5	6	7	8	9
Labour	Frank Docherty (incumbent)	28.16%	1,998								
SNP	Annette Christie	22.24%	1,578								
SNP	Russell Robertson (incumbent)†††	13.32%	945	955	996	1,001	1,011	1,050	1,787		
Labour	Marie Garrity *	8.05%	571	1,050	1,052	1,077	1,090	1,135	1,169	1,239	1,659
Conservative	Maria Wells	13.39%	950	963	964	971	991	1,016	1,027	1,037	
SNP	Mark Coburn	9.81%	696	704	803	810	817	879			
Green	Kenneth Whyte	2.66%	189	194	199	216	250				
Independent	Andrew McCullagh	1.23%	87	91	93	105					
TUSC	Matt Dobson	1.13%	80	89	91						
Electorate: 19,978 Valid: 7,094 Spoilt: 368 Quota: 1,419 Turnout: 37.4%

* = Sitting Councillor for the Baillieston ward.

=== 2012 Election ===
2012 Glasgow City Council election

East Centre – 4 seats
Party	Candidate	FPv%	Count										
Party	Candidate	FPv%	1	2	3	4	5	6	7	8	9	10	11
Labour	Frank Docherty (incumbent)	26.4	1,846										
SNP	Jennifer Dunn (incumbent)	21.8	1,523										
Labour	Elaine McDougall (incumbent)	18.2	1,272	1,581.4									
Labour	Russell Robertson (Note: Robertson defected from the Labour Party and joined the SNP in February 2016.)	14.0	981	1,043.9	1,176.6	1,179.7	1,184.6	1,199.6	1,207.6	1,245.7	1,285.1	1,383.5	1,527.7
SNP	Colin Rullkotter	5.9	414	423.2	427.3	523.5	526.5	532.6	540	566.3	605	735.5	
Green	Nina Ballantyne	4.8	335	351	356.5	363.6	371.5	390.3	404.8	460.9	520.8		
Conservative	Keenan Alexander	4.0	280	283.4	285.3	286.6	288.9	302.7	328.1	334.5			
Scottish Socialist	Daniel O'Donnell	2.2	154	159.3	162.2	166.1	168.2	171.5	176.8				
UKIP	Steven Laird	1.2	82	84.2	85.3	86.5	94.6	94.9					
Liberal Democrats	Alan Lee	0.9	62	66.4	67.4	69.3	74.9						
Glasgow First	Fraser Paterson	0.6	39	42.9	45.8	47							
Electorate: 22,939 Valid: 6,988 Spoilt: 198 Quota: 1,398 Turnout: 7,186 (31.33%)

=== 2007 Election ===
2007 Glasgow City Council election

2007 Council election: East Centre
Party	Candidate	FPv%	Count										
Party	Candidate	FPv%	1	2	3	4	5	6	7	8	9	10	11
SNP	Jennifer Dunn	21.69	1,969										
Labour	Patricia Chalmers (Note: Outgoing councillor for Carntyne single-member ward.)	19.74	1,792	1,801	1,811	1,821							
Labour	Frank Docherty	14.07	1,277	1,288	1,294	1,300	1,303	1,316	1,377	1,411	1,486	1,526	1,627
Labour	Elaine McDougall (Note: Outgoing councillor for Milnbank single-member ward.)	11.45	1,039	1,046	1,049	1,057	1,058	1,067	1,101	1,134	1,191	1,243	1,314
Green	Elaine Cooper	5.19	471	490	495	501	501	521	533	585	740	829	1,038
Solidarity	Jim Adams	6.12	556	575	583	587	587	607	626	722	771	797	
Conservative	Randle Wilson	4.22	383	387	400	460	460	539	561	566	626		
Liberal Democrats	Stuart Grieve	5.07	460	474	480	491	492	495	511	531			
Scottish Socialist	Daniel O'Donnell	3.56	323	334	336	341	341	351	372				
CPA	John Kerr	2.97	270	273	316	319	319	328					
BNP	William McLachlan	2.49	226	229	231	256	256						
Scottish Unionist	Drew Dickie	1.93	175	176	178								
Scottish Christian	David Johnston	1.51	137	140									
Electorate: 21,119 Valid: 9,078 Spoilt: 290 Quota: 1,816 Turnout: 44.36%

== See also ==
- Wards of Glasgow
