= Martin Rhodes =

British politician

Martin Rhodes MP
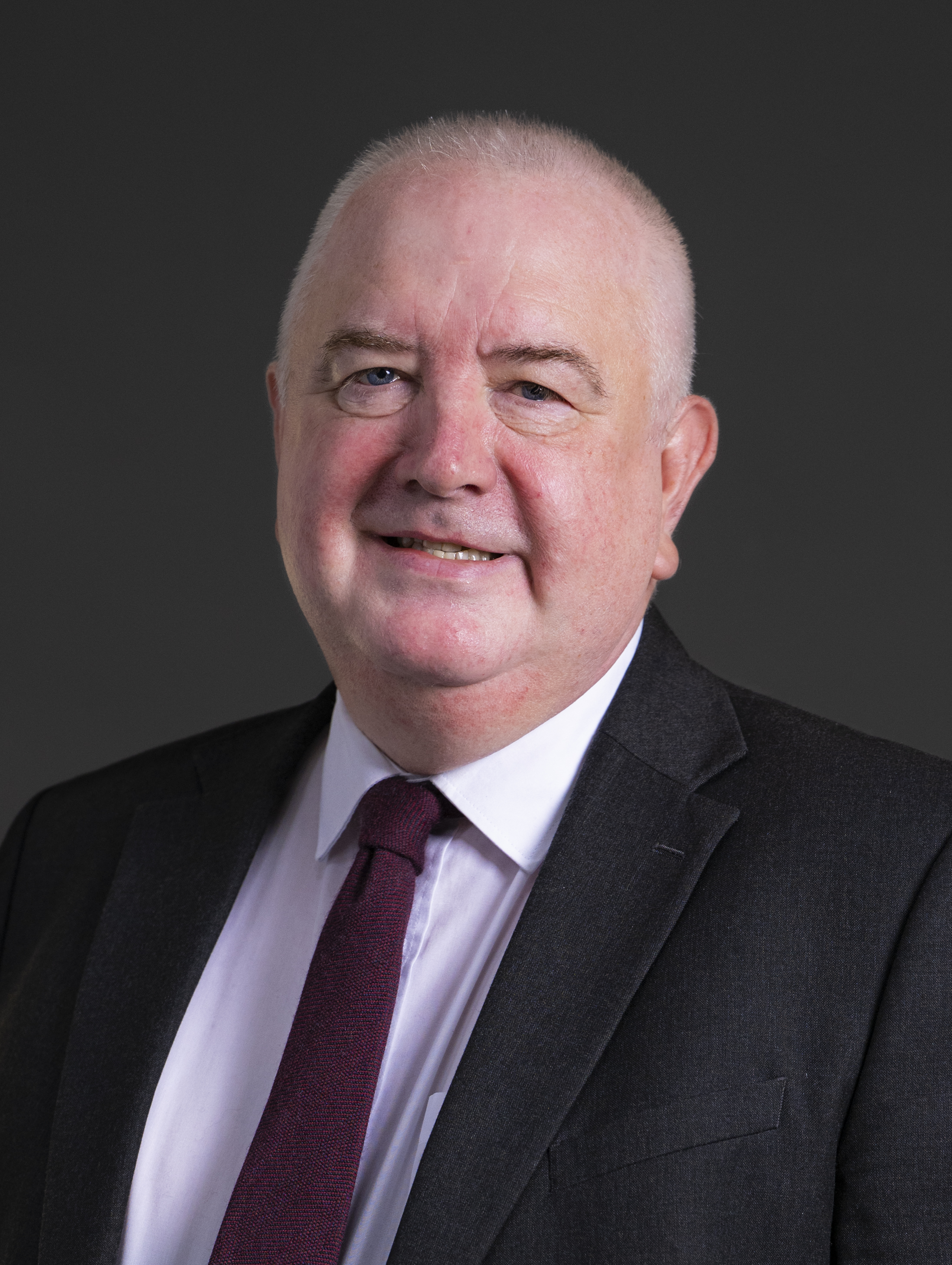
- Official portrait, 2026

Member of Parliament for Glasgow North
- Incumbent
- Assumed office 4 July 2024
- Preceded by: Patrick Grady
- Majority: 3,539 (10.2%)

Personal details
- Party: Labour

Martin Rhodes is a Scottish Labour Party politician who has been Member of Parliament for Glasgow North since 2024.

Rhodes previously served as a Scottish Labour Councillor in the wards of Maryhill/Kelvin (2012 to 2017) and Partick East/Kelvindale (2017 to 2022) on Glasgow City Council. He was an Executive Member in the previous Labour Administration and also served as the Glasgow Labour Group's Spokesperson for Communities.

He was elected an honorary president of LGBT+ Labour Scotland in February 2020.

Rhodes was the chief executive officer of the Scottish Fairtrade Forum, a charity which campaigns for ethical trade. He resigned from this role following his election as an MP.

He made his maiden speech in the House of Commons on 30 July 2024 during the debate on the Budget Responsibility Bill. He is a member of the Environmental Audit Select Committee.
