= Shettleston (ward) =

Electoral ward in Glasgow, Scotland

Shettleston: Scottish Gaelic: Baile Nighean Sheadna; Scots: Shuttlestoun
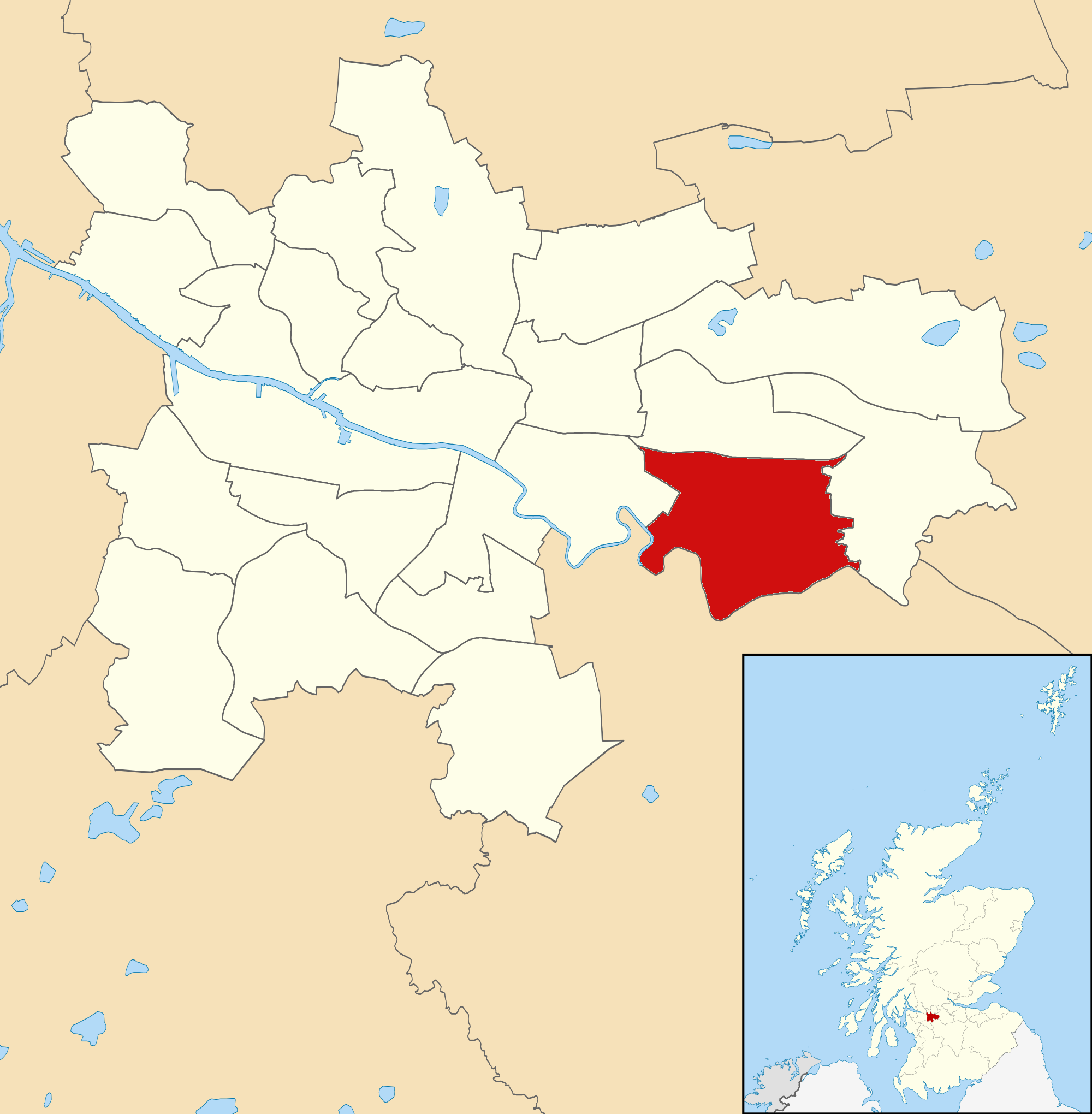
- Shettleston Ward (2017) within Glasgow

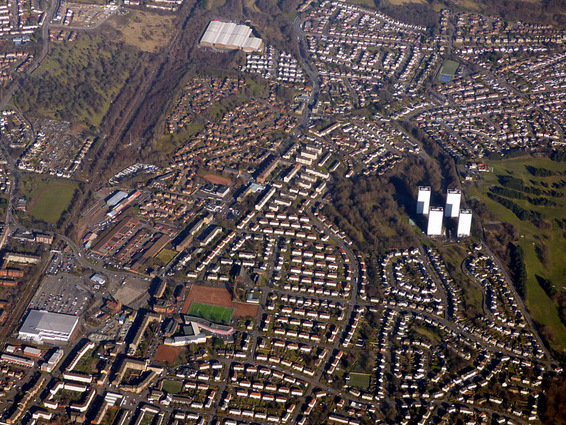
- Aerial view over part of the Shettleston ward, looking east (2018)
- Area: 10.40 km^{2} (4.02 sq mi)
- Population: 25,806 (2015)
  - Density: 2,481.3/km^{2} (6,427/sq mi)
- Council area: Glasgow City Council
- Lieutenancy area: Glasgow
- Country: Scotland
- Sovereign state: United Kingdom
- Post town: GLASGOW
- Postcode district: G32
- Dialling code: 0141
- Police: Scotland
- Fire: Scottish
- Ambulance: Scottish

Shettleston (Ward 19) is one of the 23 wards of Glasgow City Council. Since its creation in 2007 it has returned four council members, using the single transferable vote system; the boundaries have not changed since it was formed.

== Boundaries ==
Located in the east of Glasgow and immediately north of the River Clyde which forms its southern boundary, the ward is centred around the long-established settlement of Shettleston, and additionally includes the neighbourhoods of Braidfauld (east of Maukinfauld Road), Tollcross, Fullarton/Auchenshuggle, Sandyhills, Mount Vernon, Carmyle and part of Parkhead (north of Tollcross Road). The northern boundary is the North Clyde Line railway.

The ethnic makeup of the Calton ward using the 2011 census population statistics was:

- 96.7% White Scottish / British / Irish / Other
- 1.9% Asian (mainly Pakistani)
- 1% Black (mainly African)
- 0.4% Mixed / Other Ethnic Group

== Councillors ==
Election	Councillors			
2007	Tom McKeown (Labour)	George Ryan (Labour)	Euan McLeod (Labour)	John F. McLaughlin (SNP)
2012	Anne Simpson (Labour)	George Ryan (Labour)	Frank McAveety (Labour)	John F. McLaughlin (SNP)
2013 by	Anne Simpson (Labour)	Martin Neill (Labour)	Frank McAveety (Labour)	John F. McLaughlin (SNP)
2017	Michelle Ferns (SNP/ Alba) (Note: Elected as SNP councillor; defected to Alba Party in 2021.)	Thomas Kerr (Conservative/Reform UK) (Note: Elected as Conservative councillor; defected to Reform UK in 2025.)	Frank McAveety (Labour)	Laura Doherty (SNP)
2021	Michelle Ferns (SNP/ Alba)	Thomas Kerr (Conservative/Reform UK)	Frank McAveety (Labour)	Laura Doherty (SNP)
2022	Jill Pidgeon (Labour)	Thomas Kerr (Conservative/Reform UK)	Frank McAveety (Labour)	Laura Doherty (SNP)
2025	Jill Pidgeon (Labour)	Thomas Kerr (Conservative/Reform UK)	Frank McAveety (Labour)	Laura Doherty (SNP)

== Election results ==
=== 2022 election ===
Shettleston − 4 seats
Party	Candidate	FPv%	Count						
Party	Candidate	FPv%	1	2	3	4	5	6	7
SNP	Laura Doherty (incumbent)	27.8	2,048						
Labour	Frank McAveety (incumbent)	27.0	1,986						
Conservative	Thomas Kerr (incumbent)	16.7	1,232	1,238	1,269	1,288	1,294	1,333	1,368
Labour	Jill Pidgeon	12.3	903	928	1,316	1,346	1,379	1,468	1,899
SNP	David Turner (Note: Sitting councillor for Baillieston.)	7.6	556	985	997	1,004	1,045	1,292	
Green	Julie Ann Christie	5.0	370	433	445	463	524		
Scottish Socialist	Liam McLaughlan	2.2	164	176	188	194			
Liberal Democrats	Henry Sullivan	1.4	105	108	113				
Electorate: 20,542 Valid: 7,364 Spoilt: 256 Quota: 1,473 Turnout: 37.1%

=== 2017 election ===
Shettleston – 4 seats
Party	Candidate	FPv%	Count										
Party	Candidate	FPv%	1	2	3	4	5	6	7	8	9	10	11
Labour	Frank McAveety (incumbent)	25.17%	1,902										
SNP	Laura Doherty	17.95%	1,356	1,364	1,368	1,370	1,379	1,384	1,387	1,477	1,600		
Conservative	Thomas Kerr	18.10%	1,368	1,381	1,390	1,394	1,399	1,409	1,448	1,462	1,468	1,469	1,671
SNP	Michelle Ferns †††††††††	10.23%	773	778	779	782	785	785	786	811	1,377	1,453	1,597
Labour	Anne Simpson (incumbent)	11.54%	872	1,162	1,164	1,173	1,184	1,214	1,238	1,275	1,278	1,289	
SNP	Alex Kerr	9.58%	724	729	731	736	739	743	751	774			
Green	Kevin Campbell	2.94%	222	225	231	234	249	265	274				
UKIP	Jamie Robertson	1.39%	105	110	111	120	122	129					
Liberal Democrats	Timothy Pollard	1.09%	82	87	88	94	96						
TUSC	Jamie Cocozza	0.79%	60	63	67	69							
SDP	Steven Marshall	0.67%	51	54	56								
Independent	Paul Corran	0.54%	41	41									
Electorate: 21,134 Valid: 7,556 Spoilt: 326 Quota: 1,512 Turnout: 37.3%

=== 2013 by-election ===
On 7 October 2013, Labour councillor George Ryan died suddenly. A by-election was held on 5 December 2013 and the seat was retained by Labour's Martin Neill.

Shettleston by-election (5 December 2013) - 1 Seat
Party	Candidate	FPv%	Count
Party	Candidate	FPv%	1
Labour	Martin Neill	53.6	2,026
SNP	Laura Docherty	28.7	1,086
Conservative	Raymond McCrae	5.9	224
UKIP	Arthur Misty Thackeray	3.4	129
TUSC	Jamie Cocozza	1.8	68
Liberal Democrats	James Speirs	1.4	53
No Bedroom Tax	John Flanagan	1.3	50
Green	Alasdair Duke	1.1	41
Scottish Socialist	Tommy Ball	0.9	35
Christian	Victor Murphy	0.9	34
Britannica Party	Charlie Baillie	0.8	31
SDA	James Trolland	0.2	6
Electorate: 21,926 Valid: 3,783 Spoilt: 65 Quota: 1,892 Turnout: 3,777 (17.55)

=== 2012 election ===
Shettleston – 4 seats
Party	Candidate	FPv%	Count								
Party	Candidate	FPv%	1	2	3	4	5	6	7	8	9
Labour	Frank McAveety	28.3	1,989								
Labour	George Ryan (incumbent)	20.1	1,415								
SNP	John McLaughlin (incumbent)	17.8	1,251	1,283.1	1,283.2	1,285.2	1,288.8	1,301.1	1,331.4	1,358.4	2,168.1
Labour	Anne Simpson	12.1	852	1,289.1	1,293.9	1,300.9	1,317.8	1,333.6	1,359.8	1,400.5	1,444.9
SNP	Adam Miller	13.1	921	937.9	938.1	942.1	950.4	964.9	980.9	1,006.2	
Conservative	Alan Sullivan	4.2	294	298.9	299	313.3	314.3	332.9	344.9		
Green	Stuart Leckie	1.5	105	115.5	115.6	126.6	144.1	165.3			
Glasgow First	Andy Muir	1.4	98	109.7	109.7	111	119.3				
Scottish Socialist	Colin Rutherford	0.9	63	69.1	69.2	71.2					
Liberal Democrats	Marjory Watt	0.7	52	52.9	52.9						
Electorate: 21,408 Valid: 7,040 Spoilt: 174 Quota: 1,409 Turnout: 7,214 (33.70%)

=== 2007 election ===
2007 Council election: Shettleston
Party	Candidate	FPv%	%	Seat	Count
SNP	John F. McLaughlin	1,896	21.5		
Labour	Tom McKeown (Note: Outgoing councillor for Tollcross Park single-member ward.)	1,861	21.1		
Labour	George Ryan (Note: Outgoing councillor for Shettleston single-member ward.)	1,386	15.7		
Labour	Euan McLeod (Note: Outgoing councillor for Mount Vernon single-member ward.)	1,369	15.6		
Conservative	Alex White	565	6.4		
Solidarity	Wheatley Harris	458	5.2		
Liberal Democrats	David Jackson	420	4.8		
BNP	Walter Hamilton	268	3.0		
Green	Catherine Maguire	227	2.6		
Scottish Unionist	Gordon Kirker	190	2.2		
Scottish Socialist	Mick Eyre	163	1.9		

== See also ==
- Wards of Glasgow
