= Calton (ward) =

Electoral ward in Glasgow, Scotland

Calton: Scottish Gaelic: A' Challtainn
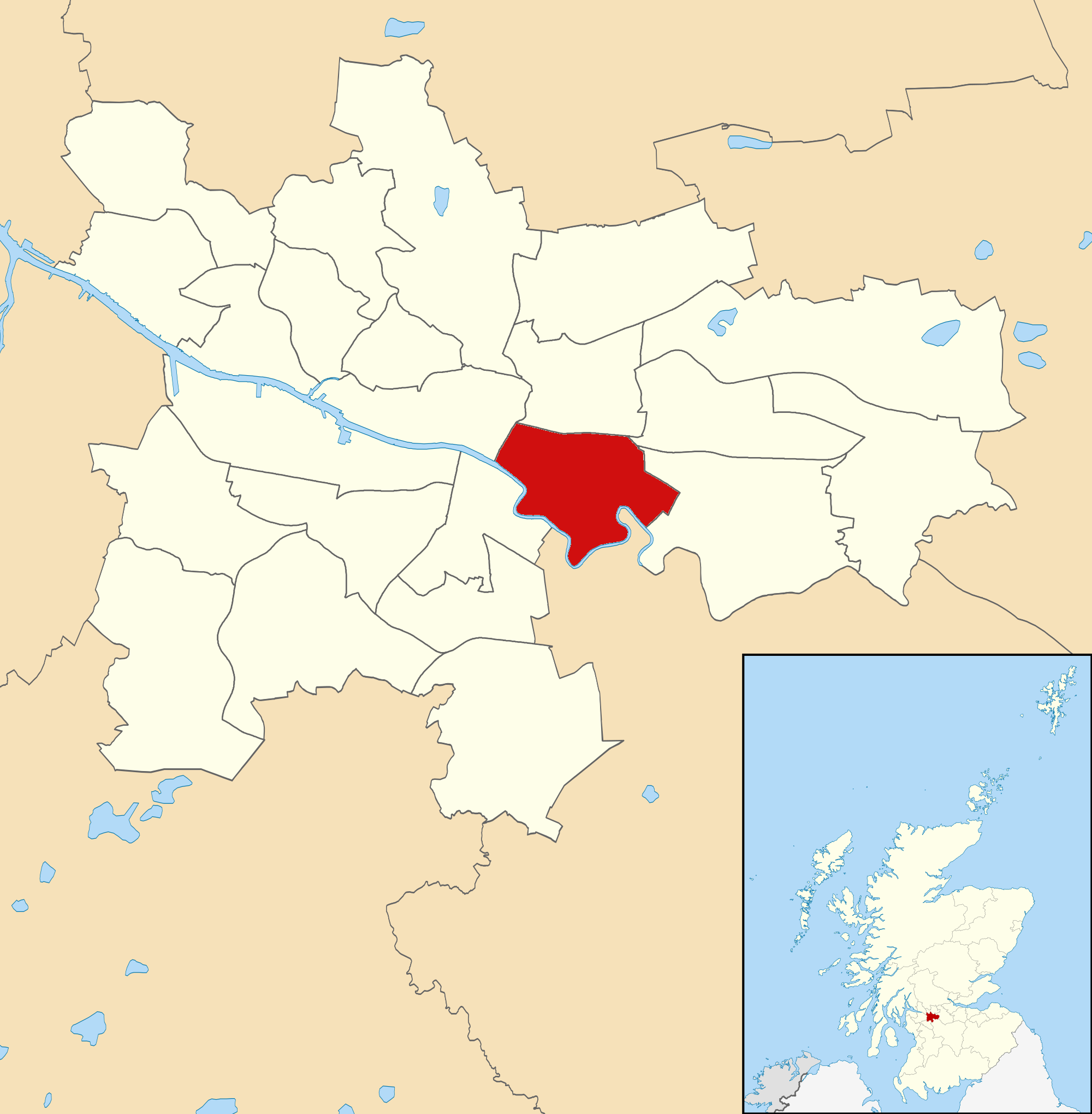
- Calton Ward (2017) within Glasgow

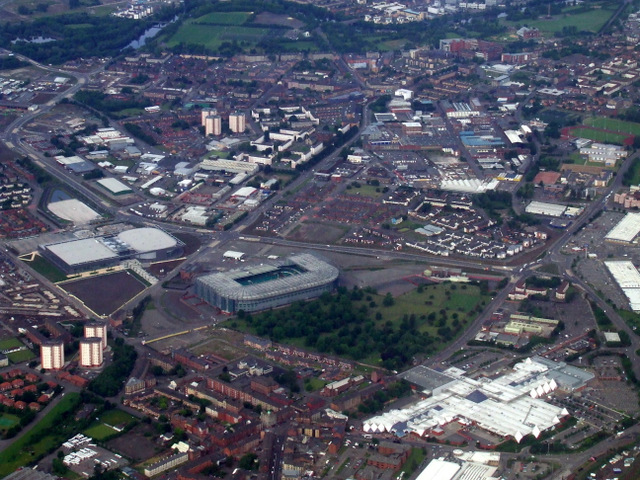
- Aerial view of the Calton ward looking west (2012)
- Area: 6.38 km^{2} (2.46 sq mi)
- Population: 27,460 (2015)
  - Density: 4,304.1/km^{2} (11,148/sq mi)
- Council area: Glasgow City Council
- Lieutenancy area: Glasgow
- Country: Scotland
- Sovereign state: United Kingdom
- Post town: GLASGOW
- Postcode district: G1, G31, G32, G4, G40
- Dialling code: 0141
- Police: Scotland
- Fire: Scottish
- Ambulance: Scottish

Calton (Ward 9) is one of the 23 wards of Glasgow City Council. On its creation in 2007 and in 2012 it returned three council members, using the single transferable vote system. For the 2017 Glasgow City Council election, the seats increased to four due to the population having risen by 20% since it was first formed, although the boundaries did not change.

== Boundaries ==
Located south-east of Glasgow city centre—the western boundary being High Street—and immediately north of the River Clyde, the ward includes the historic Calton area and the new Collegelands development as well as the neighbourhoods of Bridgeton, Dalmarnock (with the 2014 Commonwealth Games Athletes' Village, converted to residential homes), Gallowgate, Barrowfield, Newbank, Lilybank (to Maukinfauld Road), most of Parkhead (excluding parts north of Tollcross Road) and a small part of Dennistoun (the Reidvale streets between Duke Street and the North Clyde Line railway).

The ethnic makeup of the Calton ward using the 2011 census population statistics was:

- 90% White Scottish / British / Irish / Other
- 5.4% Asian (mainly Chinese)
- 3.6% Black (mainly African)
- 1% Mixed / Other Ethnic Group

== Councillors ==
Election	Councillors			
2007	George Redmond (Labour)	Ruth Simpson (Labour)	Alison Thewliss (SNP)	3 seats
2012	George Redmond (Labour)	Yvonne Kucuk (Labour)	Alison Thewliss (SNP)	3 seats
2015 by	George Redmond (Labour)	Yvonne Kucuk (Labour)	Greg Hepburn (SNP)	3 seats
2017	Robert Connelly (Conservative)	Jennifer Layden (SNP)	Greg Hepburn (SNP)	Cecilia O'Lone (Labour)
2022	George Redmond (Labour)	Linda Pike (SNP)	Greg Hepburn (SNP)	Cecilia O'Lone (Labour)

== Election results ==
=== 2022 election ===
2022 Glasgow City Council election

Calton – 4 seats
Party	Candidate	FPv%	Count								
Party	Candidate	FPv%	1	2	3	4	5	6	7	8	9
SNP	Greg Hepburn (incumbent)	24.2	1,472								
Labour	George Redmond	17.1	1,039	1,045	1,057	1,065	1,080	1,247			
Labour	Cecilia O'Lone (incumbent)	17.1	1,037	1,056	1,071	1,096	1,112	1,341			
Green	Kate Samuels	12.7	772	786	799	814	866	914	941	946	
Conservative	Robert Connelly (incumbent)	10.4	634	636	647	653	659				
SNP	Linda Pike	9.1	551	714	724	751	1,054	1,069	1,085	1,087	1,676
SNP	Olu Shokunbi	6.1	368	397	402	416					
Alba	Catherine McKernan	2.0	120	129	136						
Liberal Democrats	Alexander Palmer	1.3	79	81							
Electorate: 19,673 Valid: 6,072 Spoilt: 202 Quota: 1,215 Turnout: 31.9%

=== 2017 election ===
2017 Glasgow City Council election

Calton – 4 seats
Party	Candidate	FPv%	Count								
Party	Candidate	FPv%	1	2	3	4	5	6	7	8	9
SNP	Greg Hepburn (incumbent)	25.33%	1,389								
Labour	Cecilia O'Lone	16.81%	922	929	941	966	1,048	1,542			
SNP	Jennifer Layden	12.58%	690	867	883	890	1,080	1,101			
Conservative	Robert Connelly	11.43%	627	628	647	708	732	758	824	824	966
SNP	Linda Pike	9.32%	511	575	580	582	699	717	769	772	
Labour	Thomas Rannachan	10.98%	602	604	607	627	663				
Green	Lorraine McLaren	8.95%	491	502	535	548					
BUP	Kris McGurk	2.74%	150	151	155						
Liberal Democrats	John MacPherson	1.86%	102	103							
Electorate: 18,322 Valid: 5,484 Spoilt: 215 Quota: 1,097 Turnout: 31.1%

=== 2012 election ===
2012 Glasgow City Council election

Calton – 3 seats
Party	Candidate	FPv%	Count												
Party	Candidate	FPv%	1	2	3	4	5	6	7	8	9	10	11	12	13
Labour	George Redmond (incumbent)	35.0	1,595												
Labour	Yvonne Kucuk	19.6	892	1,220.9											
SNP	Alison Thewliss (incumbent)	15.3	695	714.1	720.2	720.2	726.2	737.2	747.9	757.8	762.8	782.3	800.7	855.6	1,449.8
SNP	Alexander Belic	14.7	672	681.9	688.7	690.7	692.1	699.1	701.5	718.6	721.2	740.2	756.6	779.8	
Green	Andy Reid	3.0	135	140.9	145.9	148.3	151.2	162.4	176.5	180.8	189.3	208.1	231.7		
Conservative	Scott Gillespie	2.6	120	123.4	124.9	125.9	127.9	127.9	135.8	138.8	184.3	193.8			
Glasgow First	Duncan Miller	2.9	131	141.8	146.6	146.6	149.2	151.5	151.7	151.9	181.3				
Scottish Unionist	Gordon Kirker	2.4	109	118.9	121	124	125	126.4	126.4	129.4					
No description	Gary Barton	1.6	71	74.4	76.4	76.4	81.5	81.6	82.7						
Liberal Democrats	Harvey Sussock	0.9	43	45.3	47.4	47.4	50.4	50.9							
Scottish Socialist	Murdo Ritchie	0.9	43	45.3	48.9	48.9	50								
Independent	Thomas Rannachan	0.9	41	43.3	45.1	45.4									
Britannica Party	Martin Clark	0.2	9	9.6	9.9										
Electorate: 18,140 Valid: 4,556 Spoilt: 191 Quota: 1,140 Turnout: 4,722 (26.03%)

==== 2015 by-election ====
On 14 May 2015 SNP counsellor Alison Thewliss resigned her seat after having been elected as an MP for the constituency of Glasgow Central. A by-election was held on 6 August 2015 and was won by the SNP's Greg Hepburn.

Calton by-election (6 August 2015) - 1 Seat
Party	Candidate	FPv%	Count
Party	Candidate	FPv%	1
SNP	Greg Hepburn	55.5%	1,507
Labour	Thomas Rannachan	30.0%	814
Conservative	Thomas Kerr	4.7%	129
UKIP	Karen King	3.8%	103
Green	Malachy Clarke	3.6%	99
Independent	Tommy Ramsay	1.7%	47
Liberal Democrats	Chris Young	0.7%	18
Electorate: 19,333 Valid: 2,717 Spoilt: 50 Quota: 1,359 Turnout: 2,767 (16.17%)

=== 2007 election ===
2007 Glasgow City Council election

2007 Council election: Calton
Party	Candidate	FPv%	Count						
Party	Candidate	FPv%	1	2	3	4	5	6	7
Labour	George Redmond (Note: Outgoing councillor for Bridgeton/Dalmarnock single-member ward.)	38.12	1,982						
SNP	Alison Thewliss	21.98	1,143	1,175	1,196	1,221	1,231	1,282	1,360
Labour	Ruth Simpson (Note: Outgoing councillor for Hyndland single-member ward.)	12.08	628	1,035	1,050	1,072	1,086	1,115	1,189
Solidarity	Fiacra Fullerton	5.81	302	325	349	373	382	420	446
Conservative	Scott Gillespie	4.71	245	250	257	260	348	371	409
Liberal Democrats	Paul Graham	4.44	231	245	252	257	265	329	
Green	Alasdair Duke-Wardrop	4.21	219	224	235	251	264		
Scottish Unionist	Danny Houston	3.75	195	217	220	225			
Scottish Socialist	Kenny Murray	2.42	126	134	140				
Independent	Gary Barton	2.46	128	130					
Electorate: 15,123 Valid: 5,199 Spoilt: 217 Quota: 1,300 Turnout: 35.83%

== See also ==
- Wards of Glasgow
