= Govan (ward) =

Electoral ward in Glasgow, Scotland

Govan: Scottish Gaelic: Baile a' Ghobhainn; Scots: Govan
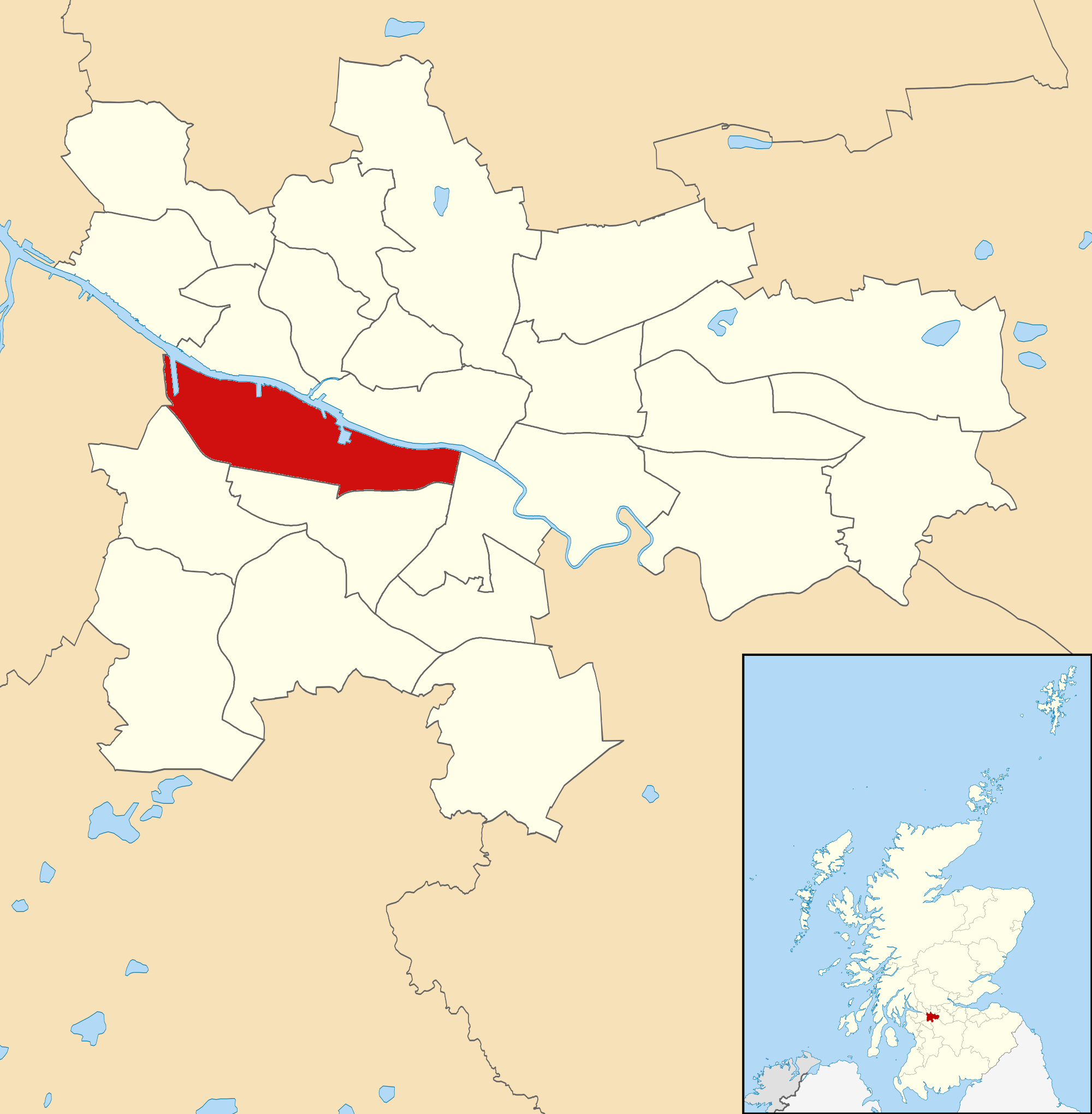
- Govan Ward (2017) within Glasgow

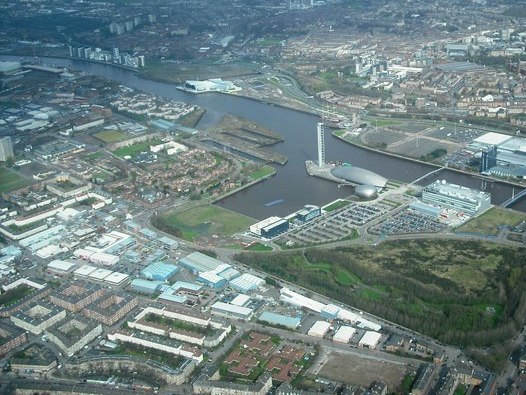
- Aerial view over Pacific Quay and Cessnock in the Govan ward (2011)
- Area: 8.26 km^{2} (3.19 sq mi)
- Population: 26,769 (2015)
  - Density: 3,240.8/km^{2} (8,394/sq mi)
- Council area: Glasgow City Council
- Lieutenancy area: Glasgow
- Country: Scotland
- Sovereign state: United Kingdom
- Post town: GLASGOW
- Postcode district: G51, G5
- Dialling code: 0141
- Police: Scotland
- Fire: Scottish
- Ambulance: Scottish

Govan (Ward 5) is one of the 23 wards of Glasgow City Council. Since its creation in 2007 it has returned four council members, using the single transferable vote system. The ward's size became smaller for the 2017 Glasgow City Council election, but it continued to return four councillors.

== Boundaries ==
Located south of the River Clyde, as well as central Govan (once a separate burgh which includes the neighbourhoods of Drumoyne, Ibrox, Linthouse and Plantation) the ward also includes the areas of Shieldhall, Cessnock, Kinning Park, Kingston and Tradeston. The boundaries were changed in 2017, with the Bellahouston, Craigton and Dumbreck neighbourhoods south of the Inverclyde Line railway being reassigned to the Pollokshields ward.

The ethnic makeup of the Govan ward using the 2011 census population statistics was:

- 84.1% White Scottish / British / Irish / Other
- 10.9% Asian (mainly Pakistani)
- 3.8% Black (mainly African)
- 1.1% Mixed / Other Ethnic Group

== Councillors ==
Election	Councillors			
2007	Stephen Dornan (Labour/ Glasgow First /SNP)	Shaukat Butt (Labour)	John Flanagan (Labour)	Allison Hunter (SNP)
2012	Stephen Dornan (Labour/ Glasgow First /SNP)	James Adams (Labour)	Fariha Thomas (Labour)	Allison Hunter (SNP)
2013 by	Stephen Dornan (Labour/ Glasgow First /SNP)	James Adams (Labour)	Fariha Thomas (Labour)	John Kane (Labour)
2015	Stephen Dornan (Labour/ Glasgow First /SNP)	James Adams (Labour)	Fariha Thomas (Labour)	John Kane (Labour)
2017	Stephen Dornan (Labour/ Glasgow First /SNP)	Richard Bell (SNP)	Allan Young (Green)	John Kane (Labour)
2022	Stephen Dornan (Labour/ Glasgow First /SNP)	Richard Bell (SNP)	Dan Hutchison (Green)	Imran Alam (Labour)

== Election results ==
=== 2022 Election ===
2022 Glasgow City Council election

Govan – 4 seats
Party	Candidate	FPv%	Count									
Party	Candidate	FPv%	1	2	3	4	5	6	7	8	9	10
Labour	Imran Alam	19.7	1,272	1,281	1,295							
SNP	Richard Bell (incumbent)	18.3	1,181	1,186	1,190	1,190	1,200	1,225	1,394			
Green	Dan Hutchison	15.1	975	1,011	1,025	1,025	1,037	1,057	1,136	1,145	1,187	1,359
SNP	Stephen Dornan (incumbent)	12.3	794	803	808	808	824	846	1,073	1,154	1,188	1,276
Labour	Ruth Hall	10.0	644	651	668	670	705	717	733	736	1,042	
Conservative	Mamun Rashid	10.0	644	645	665	665	671	679	684	685		
SNP	Funmi Fajemiseye	7.7	498	502	503	503	510	533				
Alba	Uche Gladys Emordi	2.0	132	143	147	147	156					
Independent	John Flanagan	1.9	124	128	130	130						
Liberal Democrats	Neil O'Docherty	1.5	97	100								
Scottish Socialist	Bill Bonnar	1.5	95									
Electorate: 20,026 Valid: 6,456 Spoilt: 233 Quota: 1,292 Turnout: 33.4%

=== 2017 Election ===
2017 Glasgow City Council election

Govan – 4 seats
Party	Candidate	FPv%	Count									
Party	Candidate	FPv%	1	2	3	4	5	6	7	8	9	10
Labour	John Kane (incumbent)	23.46%	1,520									
SNP	Stephen Dornan (incumbent)	17.13%	1,110	1,121	1,125	1,131	1,150	1,581				
SNP	Richard Bell	16.92%	1,096	1,100	1,105	1,115	1,122	1,259	1,486			
Green	Allan Young	9.32%	604	613	621	649	690	745	765	835	952	1,099
Conservative	Susan McCourt	11.41%	739	752	753	757	793	795	798	801	881	
Labour	Muhammad Shoaib	8.13%	527	670	674	680	704	707	715	730		
SNP	Pamela Wilson	9.68%	627	630	633	637	642					
Liberal Democrats	Benjamin Denton-Cardew	2.19%	142	147	150	160						
Scottish Socialist	Bill Bonnar	1.08%	70	72	85							
Solidarity	Liza Farrell	0.68%	44	46								
Electorate: 19,658 Valid: 6,479 Spoilt: 266 Quota: 1,296 Turnout: 34.3%

=== 2012 Election ===
2012 Glasgow City Council election

Govan – 4 seats
Party	Candidate	FPv%	Count												
Party	Candidate	FPv%	1	2	3	4	5	6	7	8	9	10	11	12	13
Labour	James Adams	24.94%	1,727												
SNP	Allison Hunter (incumbent)	21.09%	1,460												
Glasgow First	Stephen Dornan (incumbent) (Note: Dornan eventually joined the SNP in 2015.)	8.71%	603	626	627	631	640	643	650	679	714	722	886	1,069	1,156
Labour	Fariha Thomas	7.28%	504	728	729	730	735	740	747	788	826	873	995	1,175	1,261
SNP	Jonathan Mackie	6.40%	443	452	512	517	522	532	538	601	625	879	931	993	
No description	John Flanagan (incumbent)	9.30%	644	660	661	668	671	677	688	716	741	742	753		
Glasgow First	Shaukat Butt (incumbent)	5.75%	398	408	408	409	415	416	427	445	468	515			
SNP	Tahir Mohammed	5.14%	356	359	363	363	367	370	370	385	392				
Conservative	Harriet Murdoch	3.16%	219	222	223	223	224	242	323	339					
Green	Jesper Bach	3.31%	229	237	238	261	280	307	315						
Scottish Unionist	Alan Hughes	2.07%	143	148	148	154	154	156							
Liberal Democrats	Chris Young	1.26%	87	91	92	92	92								
Solidarity	Joyce Drummond	0.87%	60	62	62	65									
Pirate	Finlay Archibald	0.74%	51	54	54										
Electorate: 23,590 Valid: 6,924 Spoilt: 297 (4.11%) Quota: 1,385 Turnout: 7,221 (30.61%)

==== 2013 by-election ====
Govan by-election (10 October 2013) - 1 Seat
Party	Candidate	FPv%	Count												
Party	Candidate	FPv%	1	2	3	4	5	6	7	8	9	10	11	12	13
Labour	John Kane	43.4	2,055	2,055	2,056	2,058	2,062	2,075	2,082	2,108	2,137	2,149	2,180	2,216	2,417
SNP	Helen Walker	30.1	1,424	1,425	1,426	1,431	1,435	1,449	1,456	1,466	1,485	1,497	1,541	1,575	1,678
No Bedroom Tax	John Flanagan	9.4	446	446	449	455	466	479	483	487	501	515	539	562	
Conservative	Richard Sullivan	4.5	215	215	216	216	216	218	229	237	243	269	293		
UKIP	Janice MacKay	2.4	113	113	116	116	116	116	119	120	126				
Green	Moira Crawford	2.4	112	112	113	116	125	129	131	142	150	158			
Independent	George Laird	2.2	103	102	102	104	104	105	113	117					
Liberal Democrats	Ewan Hoyle	1.5	73	73	74	75	76	76	84						
Scottish Christian	John Cormack	1.3	60	60	61	62	65	65							
Independent	Thomas Rannachan	1.1	52	52	52	52	53								
Communist	Ryan Boyle	0.7	35	35	35	37									
Solidarity	Joyce Drummond	0.6	28	28	29										
Britannica Party	Charles Baillie	0.4	19												
SDA	James Trolland	0.0	1												
Electorate: 24,203 Valid: 4,736 Spoilt: 120 Quota: 2,369 Turnout: 4,856 (20.06%)

=== 2007 Election ===
2007 Glasgow City Council election

2007 Council election: Govan (4 members)
Party	Candidate	FPv%	Count							
Party	Candidate	FPv%	1	2	3	4	5	6	7	8
SNP	Allison Hunter	28.18	2,694							
Labour	John Flanagan (Note: Outgoing councillor for Govan single-member ward.)	17.33	1,657	1,705	1,711	1,718	1,747	1,781	1,845	1,881
Labour	Stephen Dornan (Note: Outgoing councillor for Drumoyne single-member ward.)††††††	16.63	1,590	1,651	1,657	1,666	1,696	1,743	1,812	1,852
Labour	Shaukat Butt (Note: Outgoing councillor for Kingston single-member ward.)††††††††††	14.34	1,371	1,412	1,415	1,417	1,449	1,503	1,550	1,594
Green	Will Jess	3.94	377	473	506	517	555	711	842	977
Conservative	Patricia McIntyre	4.71	450	480	481	531	607	675	690	
Solidarity	Irene Lang	4.16	398	505	548	557	580	600		
Liberal Democrats	Michael Cobley	4.12	394	449	455	468	485			
Independent	George McNee	3.94	377	399	401	408				
Scottish Unionist	Alan Hughes	1.44	138	146	147					
Scottish Socialist	Carolina Perez	1.19	114	138						
Electorate: 23,113 Valid: 9,560 Spoilt: 255 Quota: 1,913 Turnout: 42.47%

== See also ==
- Wards of Glasgow
