= Cardonald (ward) =

Ward of the Glasgow City Council in Scotland

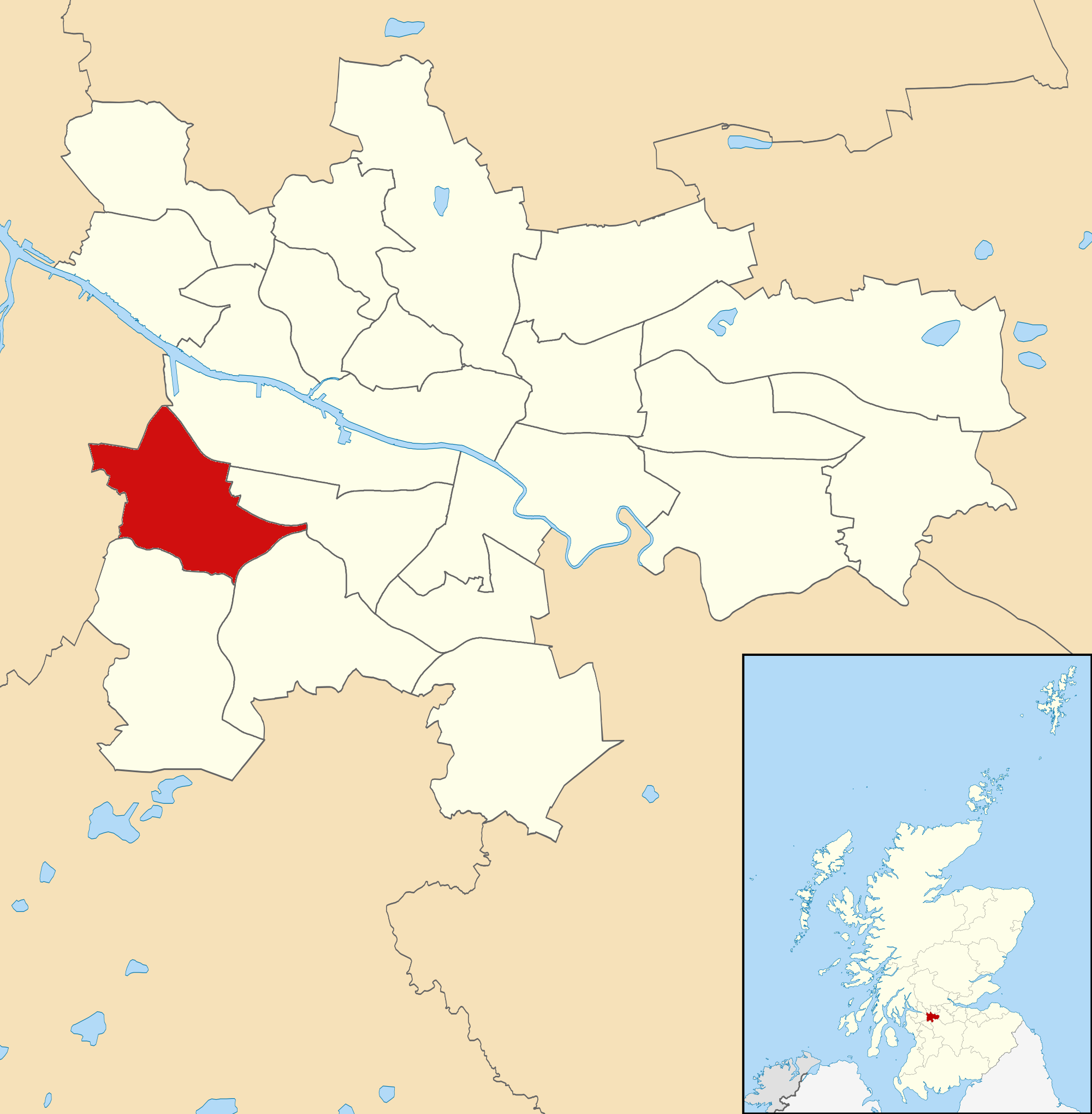
- Cardonald Ward (2017) within Glasgow

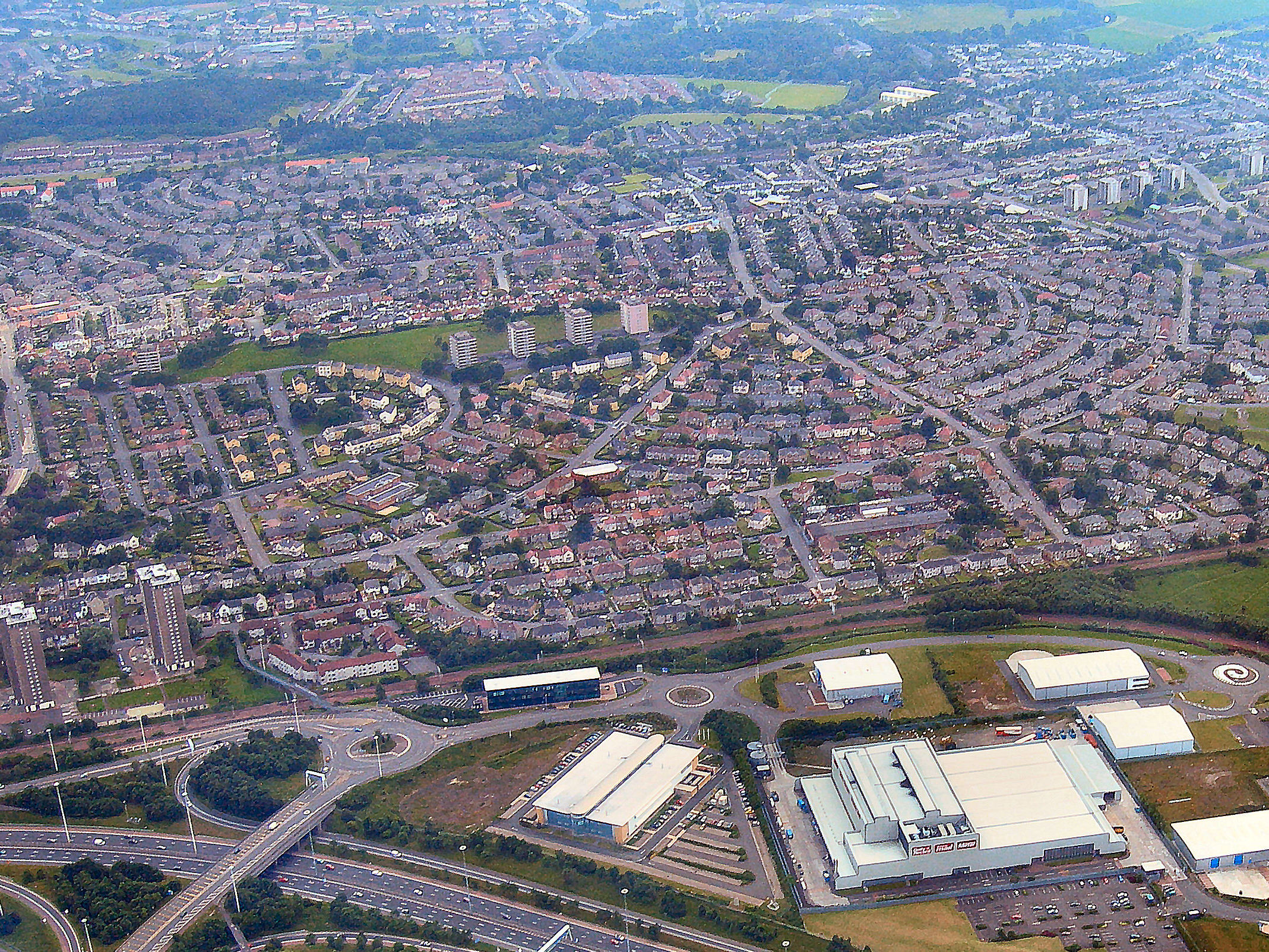
- Aerial view of Cardonald looking south, 2010
- Area: 7.27 km^{2} (2.81 sq mi)
- Population: 29,639 (2017)
  - Density: 4,076.9/km^{2} (10,559/sq mi)
- Council area: Glasgow City Council
- Lieutenancy area: Glasgow
- Country: Scotland
- Sovereign state: United Kingdom
- Post town: GLASGOW
- Postcode district: G51, G52, G53
- Dialling code: 0141
- Police: Scotland
- Fire: Scottish
- Ambulance: Scottish

Cardonald (Ward 4) is one of the 23 wards of Glasgow City Council. It was created in 2007 as Craigton and returned four council members using the single transferable vote system. The same name and boundaries were used in the 2012 elections. For the 2017 Glasgow City Council election, the name was changed (Craigton is the name of a historic estate and was used as a ward name in past versions of the town authority, but in modern times the urban neighbourhood known by that name did not fall within its boundaries, whereas the whole of the larger Cardonald district did) although the territory and councillor numbers remained the same.

== Boundaries ==
Located in the southwest of Glasgow, the ward includes Cardonald as well as Hillington, Halfway, Penilee, Mosspark, Corkerhill, the northern part of Crookston (known as Rosshall) and the northern part of Pollok (the Lyoncross/Templeland area north of the Levern Water, the rest of the district coming under the Greater Pollok ward).

The ethnic makeup of the Cardonald ward using the 2011 census population statistics was:

- 93.8% White Scottish / British / Irish / Other
- 4.1% Asian
- 1.3% Black (Mainly African)
- 0.7% Mixed / Other Ethnic Group

== Councillors ==
Election	Councillors			
2007	Alistair Watson (Labour)	John Matthew Kerr (Labour)	Ruth Black (Solidarity)	Iris Gibson (SNP)
2012	Alistair Watson (Labour)	John Matthew Kerr (Labour)	Jim Torrance (SNP)	Iris Gibson (SNP)
2012 by	Alistair Watson (Labour)	John Matthew Kerr (Labour)	Jim Torrance (SNP)	Alex Wilson (SNP)
2017	Alistair Watson (Labour)	John Matthew Kerr (Labour)	Elaine McSporran (SNP)	Alex Wilson (SNP)
2017 by	Jim Kavanagh (Labour)	John Matthew Kerr (Labour)	Elaine McSporran (SNP)	Alex Wilson (SNP)
2022	Jim Kavanagh (Labour)	John Matthew Kerr (Labour)	Elaine McSporran (SNP)	Alex Wilson (SNP)

== Election results ==
=== 2022 Election ===
2022 Glasgow City Council election

Cardonald – 4 seats
Party	Candidate	FPv%	Count							
Party	Candidate	FPv%	1	2	3	4	5	6	7	8
SNP	Elaine McSporran (incumbent)	29.0	2,489							
Labour	Jim Kavanagh (incumbent)	27.6	2,367							
Labour	Matt Kerr (incumbent)	14.4	1,236	1,275	1,809					
SNP	Alex Wilson (incumbent)	10.2	872	1,476	1,496	1,507	1,532	1,548	1,647	2,007
Conservative	Stephen Paxton	8.8	755	758	776	789	792	836	857	886
Green	Ellie Gomersall	5.4	461	514	522	532	535	581	619	
Alba	Alexander Torrance	2.2	189	211	222	225	226	233		
Liberal Democrats	Ross Chalmers	1.8	153	159	168	182	192			
SDP	Robin Dudfield	0.6	50	53	56	59				
Electorate: 22,574 Valid: 8,572 Spoilt: 242 Quota: 1,715 Turnout: 39.0%

=== 2017 Election ===
2017 Glasgow City Council election

Cardonald – 4 seats
Party	Candidate	FPv%	Count								
Party	Candidate	FPv%	1	2	3	4	5	6	7	8	9
SNP	Elaine McSporran	20.66%	1,913								
Labour Co-op	Matt Kerr (incumbent)	20.45%	1,894								
SNP	Alex Wilson (incumbent)	14.39%	1,333	1,345	1,346	1,350	1,371	1,381	1,455	2,192	
Labour Co-op	Alistair Watson (incumbent)†	17.35%	1,607	1,608	1,637	1,655	1,677	1,732	1,782	1,829	1,912
Conservative	Judy Lockhart	11.68%	1,082	1,082	1,084	1,121	1,129	1,167	1,180	1,189	1,197
SNP	Joe Murray	8.29%	768	810	811	816	837	847	927		
Green	Alan Sharkey	2.52%	233	234	235	244	268	309			
Liberal Democrats	Isabel Nelson	1.97%	182	182	184	190	196				
Solidarity	Lynn Sheridan	1.41%	131	132	133	141					
UKIP	Robert Barclay	1.27%	118	118	119						
Electorate: 22,853 Valid: 9,261 Spoilt: 321 Quota: 1,853 Turnout: 41.9%

==== 2017 by-election ====
Labour councillor Alistair Watson died suddenly on 29 June 2017. A by-election was held on 7 September 2017 and was won by Jim Kavanagh of the Scottish Labour Party.

Cardonald by-election (7 September 2017) - 1 seat
Party	Candidate	FPv%	Count				
Party	Candidate	FPv%	1	2	3	4	5
Labour	Jim Kavanagh	48.6	2,614	2,615	2,641	2,683	2,936
SNP	Alex Mitchell	36.7	1,972	1,972	1,981	2,066	2,101
Conservative	Thomas Haddow	10.3	552	554	566	574	
Green	John Smith	2.7	147	151	161		
Liberal Democrats	Isabel Nelson	1.5	80	82			
Scottish Libertarian	Antony Sammeroff	0.2	12				
Electorate: 23,248 Valid: 5,377 Spoilt: 97 Quota: 2,689 Turnout: 23.7%

=== 2012 Election ===
2012 Glasgow City Council election

Craigton – 4 seats
Party	Candidate	FPv%	Count									
Party	Candidate	FPv%	1	2	3	4	5	6	7	8	9	10
Labour	Matt Kerr (incumbent)	27.8	2,279									
Labour	Alistair Watson (incumbent)	25.6	2,102									
SNP	Iris Gibson (incumbent)	22.9	1,876									
SNP	Jim Torrance	8.5	700	771.8	826.7	1,004.1	1,010.7	1,025.9	1,048.7	1,128.1	1,193.8	1,434.9
Solidarity	Gail Sheridan	5.8	472	555.3	624.3	638.9	646.9	656.8	688	735.1	772.4	
Conservative	Jayne Morgan	3.6	292	316.7	330.5	333.3	365.7	391.1	411.9	431.5		
Green	Ian Ruffell	2.1	169	209.9	237.8	245	256.7	273.9	314			
Glasgow First	Gordon MacDiarmid	1.8	147	193.8	226.6	233.7	245.3	259.2				
Liberal Democrats	Isabel Nelson	0.9	76	103.2	115.5	119.7	123.7					
UKIP	Janice MacKay	1.0	86	99.7	107.2	109.7						
Electorate: 22,948 Valid: 8,199 Spoilt: 124 Quota: 1,640 Turnout: 8,439 (36.77%)

==== 2015 by-election ====
On 10 June 2015, SNP counsellor Iris Gibson retired due to ill health. A by-election was held on 6 August and was won by the SNP's Alex Wilson.

Craigton by-election (6 August 2015) - 1 Seat
Party	Candidate	FPv%	Count
Party	Candidate	FPv%	1
SNP	Alex Wilson	54.2%	2,674
Labour	Kevin O'Donnell	33.3%	1,643
Conservative	Philip Charles	6.1%	300
Green	Katie Noble	2.8%	136
UKIP	Arthur Misty Thackeray	1.9%	95
Liberal Democrats	Isabel Nelson	1.8%	87
Electorate: 24,119 Valid: 4,935 Spoilt: 71 Quota: 2,468 Turnout: 5,006 (21.64%)

=== 2007 Election ===
2007 Glasgow City Council election

2007 Council election: Craigton (4 members)
Party	Candidate	FPv%	Count							
Party	Candidate	FPv%	1	2	3	4	5	6	7	8
SNP	Iris Gibson	24.69	2,729							
Labour	Alistair Watson (Note: Outgoing councillor for North Cardonald single-member ward.)	18.68	2,065	2,096	2,103	2,132	2,161	2,226		
Labour	John Matthew Kerr	17.37	1,920	1,972	1,992	2,007	2,035	2,123	2,127	2,177
Solidarity	Ruth Black†	11.04	1,220	1,315	1,324	1,382	1,462	1,557	1,559	1,641
Labour	Gordon McDiamid	12.02	1,328	1,350	1,357	1,371	1,387	1,430	1,435	1,493
Conservative	Scott Alexander Petty	5.15	569	594	698	702	727	797	798	
Liberal Democrats	Scott R Goghill	4.13	457	500	508	525	631			
Green	Gordon Masterton	2.85	315	366	390	414				
Scottish Socialist	Wullie McGartland	2.03	224	247	256					
Scottish Unionist	Mark Dingwall	2.04	225	234						
Electorate: 22,772 Valid: 11,052 Spoilt: 243 Quota: 2,211 Turnout: 49.62%

== See also ==
- Wards of Glasgow
