= Garscadden/Scotstounhill (ward) =

Electoral ward in Glasgow, Scotland

Garscadden/Scotstounhill: Scottish Gaelic: Gart Sgadan/Cnoc Scotstoun
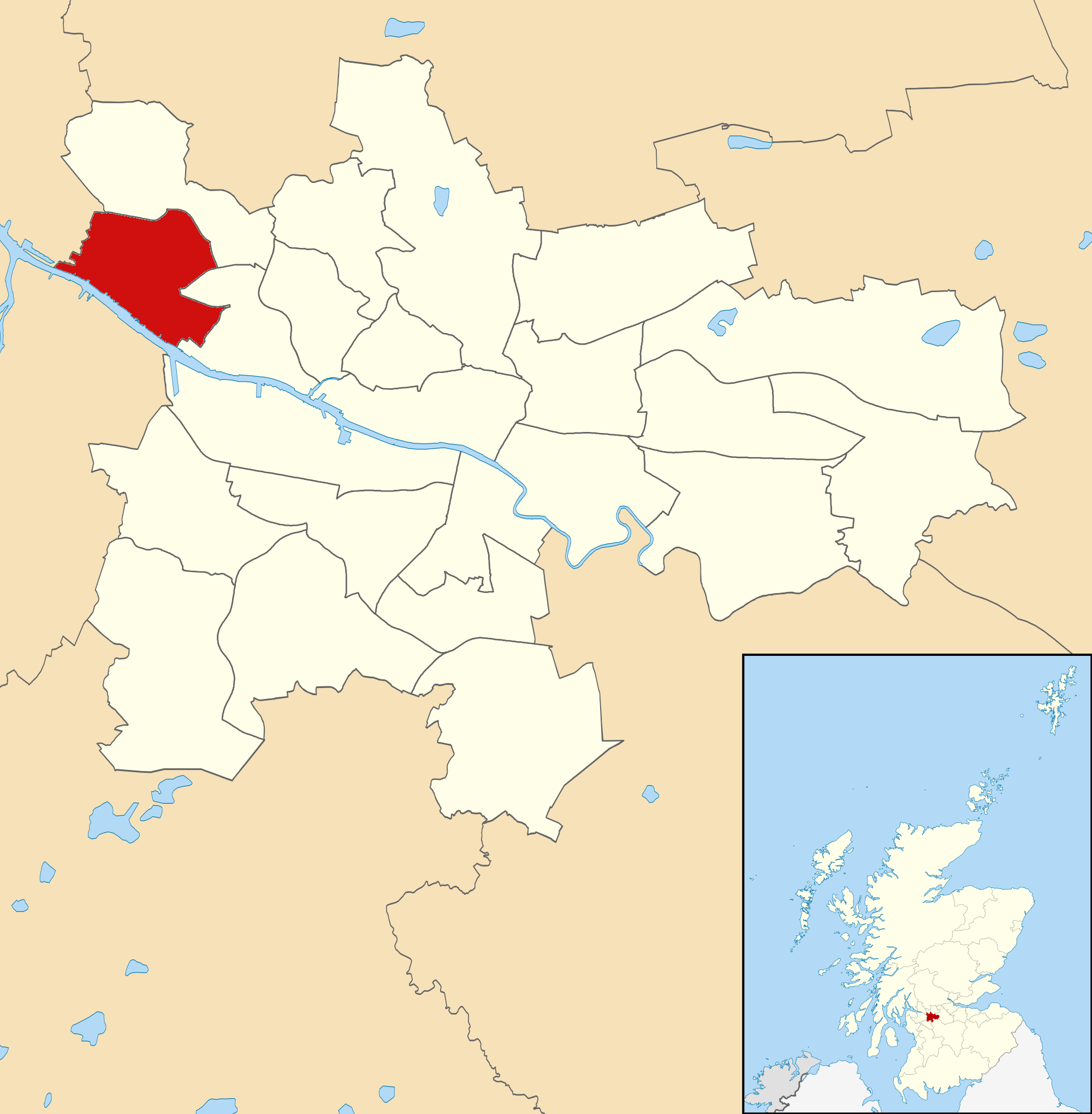
- Garscadden/Scotstounhill Ward (2017) within Glasgow

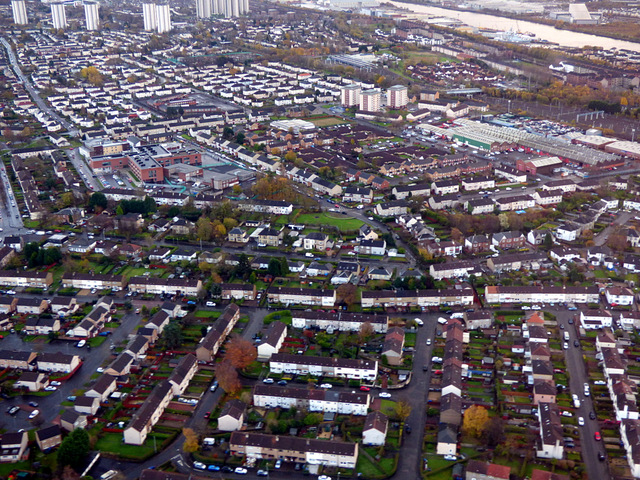
- Aerial view of part of the ward, looking east (2017)
- Area: 5.94 km^{2} (2.29 sq mi)
- Population: 30,565 (2015)
  - Density: 5,145.6/km^{2} (13,327/sq mi)
- Council area: Glasgow City Council
- Lieutenancy area: Glasgow
- Country: Scotland
- Sovereign state: United Kingdom
- Post town: GLASGOW
- Postcode district: G13, G14
- Dialling code: 0141
- Police: Scotland
- Fire: Scottish
- Ambulance: Scottish

Garscadden/Scotstounhill (Ward 13) is one of the 23 wards of Glasgow City Council. Since its creation in 2007 it has retained the same boundaries and returned four council members, using the single transferable vote system.

== Boundaries ==
Located in the north-west of Glasgow, the ward is immediately north of the River Clyde which is its southern boundary. It is directly adjacent to the town of Clydebank (West Dunbartonshire) to the west. As its name suggests, it includes the neighbourhoods of Garscadden and Scotstounhill, as well as Yoker, Scotstoun and part of Knightswood (streets to the west of Great Western Road and Knightswood Road).

The ethnic makeup of the Garscadden/Scotstounhill ward using the 2011 census population statistics was:

- 89.8% White Scottish / British / Irish / Other
- 4.9% Asian (mainly Pakistani)
- 4.2% Black (mainly African)
- 1.2% Mixed / Other Ethnic Group

== Councillors ==
Election	Councillors			
2007	Liz Cameron (Labour)	Paul Rooney (Labour)	Jean McFadden (Labour)	Graeme Hendry (SNP)
2012	Liz Cameron (Labour)	Paul Rooney (Labour)	John Kelly (Labour)	Graeme Hendry (SNP)
2016 by	Liz Cameron (Labour)	Paul Rooney (Labour)	Chris Cunningham (SNP)	Graeme Hendry (SNP)
2017	Bill Butler (Labour)	Eva Murray (Labour)	Chris Cunningham (SNP)	Michael Cullen (SNP)
2022	Bill Butler (Labour)	Eva Murray (Labour)	Chris Cunningham (SNP)	Malcolm Mitchell (SNP)

== Election results ==
=== 2022 Election ===
2022 Glasgow City Council election

Garscadden/Scotstounhill – 4 seats
Party	Candidate	FPv%	Count					
Party	Candidate	FPv%	1	2	3	4	5	6
Labour	Bill Butler (incumbent)	27.9	2,403					
SNP	Chris Cunningham (incumbent)	26.8	2,310					
Labour	Eva Murray (incumbent)	10.9	940	1,438	1,452	1,512	1,548	1,795
Conservative	Steven Morrison	10.3	886	932	935	966	968	1,001
SNP	Rosemary Ugbah	8.6	745	751	821	829		
Green	John Hamelink	8.3	712	747	802	845	939	
SNP	Malcolm Mitchell	5.3	460	479	802	845	1,554	1,993
Liberal Democrats	Hugh Waterfield	2.0	173	186	189			
Electorate: 22,355 Valid: 8,629 Spoilt: 293 Quota: 1,726 Turnout: 39.9%

=== 2017 Election ===
2017 Glasgow City Council election

Garscadden/Scotstounhill – 4 seats
Party	Candidate	FPv%	Count									
Party	Candidate	FPv%	1	2	3	4	5	6	7	8	9	10
Labour	Bill Butler *	23.25%	2,020									
SNP	Michael Cullen†††††	20.15%	1,751									
SNP	Chris Cunningham (incumbent)	14.05%	1,221	1,233	1,243	1,261	1,269	1,282	1,424	2,345		
Labour	Eva Murray	10.49%	912	1,117	1,117	1,123	1,140	1,183	1,293	1,340	1,506	1,975
Conservative	Tariq Parvez	12.20%	1,060	1,070	1,070	1,072	1,108	1,161	1,191	1,203	1,217	
SNP	Roza Salih	10.66%	926	927	929	934	935	941	1,066			
Green	Gillian MacDonald	5.05%	439	445	445	460	478	525				
Liberal Democrats	David Walker	2.19%	191	194	194	197	207					
UKIP	Gisela Allen	1.22%	106	110	110	114						
Solidarity	Samuel Cook	0.71%	62	65	65							
Electorate: 22,514 Valid: 8,688 Spoilt: 338 Quota: 1,738 Turnout: 40.1%

* = Sitting Councillor for Greater Pollok ward.

=== 2012 Election ===
2012 Glasgow City Council election

Garscadden/Scotstounhill – 4 seats
Party	Candidate	FPv%	Count												
Party	Candidate	FPv%	1	2	3	4	5	6	7	8	9	10	11	12	13
Labour	Liz Cameron (incumbent)	28.0	2,295												
Labour	Paul Rooney (incumbent)	27.0	2,220												
SNP	Graeme Hendry (incumbent)	22.2	1,820												
Labour	John Kelly	6.6	541	993.4	1,417	1,422.1	1,427.4	1,432.9	1,439.4	1,459.3	1,491.9	1,512.2	1,541.4	1,606.6	1,712.3
SNP	David Wilson	4.9	400	430.4	465.1	604.1	609.1	612.4	620.6	632	654.8	689.1	716	791.5	
Green	Martin Schmierer	2.7	221	240.6	252.1	259.6	263.9	273.8	279.3	303	309.3	350.6	400.8		
Conservative	Susan McCourt	2.6	215	226.7	231.6	233.5	235.9	235.9	249.9	267.9	286.7	311.6			
Independent	Phil Jarvis	1.8	151	164.7	174	176.9	177.8	180	205	211.2	239.2				
Scottish Christian	John Cormack	1.6	135	149.2	154.7	156.7	156.7	157.7	164.1	169.2					
Liberal Democrats	James Speirs	1.1	90	98.3	103.5	105.7	106.8	109.8	112.5						
UKIP	Ian Cumming	0.8	69	80.4	84	86.4	86.7	89.7							
TUSC	Ryan Stuart	0.4	29	31.6	32.3	32.5	35.2								
Glasgow First	Mark Muir	0.3	22	23.9	27.6	28.4									
Electorate: 21,743 Valid: 8,208 Spoilt: 258 Quota: 1,642 Turnout: 8,466 (39.94%)

==== 2016 by-election ====
On 25 July 2016, Labour councillor John Kelly died as a result of Motor Neuron Disease. A by-election was held on 6 October 2016 and was won by the SNP's Chris Cunningham.

Garscadden/Scotstounhill by-election (6 October 2016) - 1 Seat
Party	Candidate	FPv%	Count					
Party	Candidate	FPv%	1	2	3	4	5	6
SNP	Chris Cunningham	42.6%	2,135	2,140	2,150	2,275	2,321	2,906
Labour	Ian Cruikshank	38.8%	1,944	1,953	1,984	2,037	2,204	
Conservative	Ary Jaff	10.2%	510	536	553	564		
Green	Gillian MacDonald	4.8%	242	247	261			
Liberal Democrats	James Speirs	1.9%	97	105				
UKIP	Donald MacKay	1.7%	83					
Electorate: 21,419 Valid: 5,011 Spoilt: 83 Quota: 2,506 Turnout: 5,094 (23.8%)

=== 2007 Election ===
2007 Glasgow City Council election

2007 Council election: Garscadden/Scotstounhill
Party	Candidate	FPv%	Count							
Party	Candidate	FPv%	1	2	3	4	5	6	7	8
Labour	Liz Cameron (Note: Outgoing councillor for Knightswood South single-member ward.)	27.01	2,744							
SNP	Graeme Hendry	22.96	2,333							
Labour	Paul Rooney	18.65	1,895	2,007	2,026	2,037				
Labour	Jean McFadden (Note: Outgoing councillor for Scotstoun single-member ward.)	10.97	1,115	1,450	1,478	1,500	1,503	1,523	1,576	1,681
Green	Sue England	3.96	402	426	464	500	500	517	640	820
Conservative	Matthew T Smith	5.26	534	544	557	558	558	652	659	746
Liberal Democrats	James Paris	4.75	483	508	544	563	563	576	614	
Solidarity	Charlotte Ahmed	3.13	318	338	375	414	414	421		
Scottish Unionist	Robert Findlay	1.88	191	201	205	214	214			
Scottish Socialist	Peter Lavelle	1.43	145	156	177					
Electorate: 20,869 Valid: 10,160 Spoilt: 215 Quota: 2,033 Turnout: 49.71%

== See also ==
- Wards of Glasgow
