= 2012 Glasgow City Council election =

2012 Scottish local government election

- 3 May 2012

All 79 seats to Glasgow City Council 40 seats needed for a majority
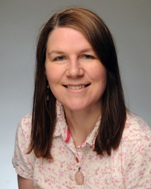
	First party	Second party	Third party
Leader	Gordon Matheson	Allison Hunter	Martha Wardrop
Party	Labour	SNP	Green
Leader's seat	Anderston/City	Govan	Hillhead
Last election	45 seats, 43.3%	22 seats, 24.6%	5 seats, 6.5%
Seats won	44	27	5
Seat change	▼1	▲5	0
Popular vote	67,341	46,947	7,999
Percentage	46.7%	32.6%	5.5%
Swing	▲3.4%	▲8.0%	▼1.0%
	Fourth party	Fifth party	Sixth party
Leader	David Meikle	Margot Clark	Stephen Dornan
Party	Conservative	Liberal Democrats	Glasgow First
Leader's seat	Pollokshields	Linn	Govan
Last election	1 seat, 7.7%	5 seats, 7.9%	New party
Seats before		6
Seats won	1	1	1
Seat change	0	▼4	▲1
Popular vote	8,567	4,221	2,544
Percentage	5.9%	2.9%	1.8%
Swing	▼1.8%	▼5.0%	▲1.8%
- The 21 multi-member wards

Council Leader before election
Gordon Matheson
Labour
Council Leader after election
Gordon Matheson
Labour

Elections to Glasgow City Council were held on 3 May 2012, the same day as the other Scottish local government elections. The election was the second using 21 new wards created as a result of the Local Governance (Scotland) Act 2004, each ward elected three or four councillors using the single transferable vote system form of proportional representation.

The election in Glasgow attracted the most attention out of the local elections in Scotland as there were many predictions that the Scottish Labour would lose control of the council due to losses of seats to the Scottish National Party. The Labour administration had suffered from a number of defections of council members to the newly formed Glasgow First party and controversy surrounding Councillor's salaries and contracts. In the end, Labour remained in control, losing just one seat, while the SNP gained five. The Scottish Liberal Democrats were reduced to holding just one seat on the council, the same numbers as the Scottish Conservatives (who retained their solitary seat) and Glasgow First. The Scottish Greens retained five seats on the authority.

After the elections Labour again formed a controlling administration on the City Council.

== Election result ==

2012 Glasgow City Council election
Party	Seats	Gains	Losses	Net gain/loss	Seats %	Votes %	Votes	+/−
Labour	44	1	2	▼1	55.70	46.72	67,341	+3.40
SNP	27	5	0	▲5	34.17	32.57	46,947	+7.99
Green	5	1	1	0	6.33	5.55	7,999	-0.93
Conservative	1	0	0	0	1.27	5.94	8,567	-1.73
Liberal Democrats	1	0	4	▼4	1.27	2.93	4,221	-4.98
Glasgow First	1	1	0	▲1	1.27	1.76	2,544	New
Independent	0	-	-	-	-	1.7	2,432	+0.59
Scottish Socialist	0	-	-	-	-	0.7	979	-1.76
TUSC	0	-	-	-	-	0.4	636	New
Solidarity	0	0	1	▼1	-	0.4	621	-4.31
Scottish Unionist	0	0	0	0	-	0.4	586	-0.67
UKIP	0	-	-	-	-	0.3	441	New
Scottish Christian	0	-	-	-	-	0.2	354	-0.13
Socialist Labour	0	-	-	-	-	0.2	271	New
Pirate	0	0	0	0	-	0.1	97	New
Britannica Party	0	0	0	0	-	0.1	73	New
Turnout		144,149	32.4%					

Note: "Votes" are the first preference votes. The net gain/loss and percentage changes relate to the result of the previous Scottish local elections on 3 May 2007. This may differ from other published sources showing gain/loss relative to seats held at dissolution of Scotland's councils.

== Ward summary ==
Results of the 2012 Glasgow City Council election by ward
Ward	%	Seats	%	Seats	%	Seats	%	Seats	%	Seats	%	Seats	%	Seats	Total
Ward	Labour		SNP		Conservative		Green		Lib Dem		Glasgow First		Others		Total
Linn	46.04	2	29.44	1	7.03	0	2.73	0	12.09	1	1.06	0	1.61	0	4
Newlands/Auldburn	40.98	2	36.11	1	10.77	0	3.61	0	1.56	0	0.71	0	6.26	0	3
Greater Pollok	47.65	2	34.03	2	3.73	0	2.11	0	1.12	0	8.23	0	3.13	0	4
Craigton	53.4	2	31.4	2	3.6	0	2.1	0	0.9	0	1.8	0	6.8	0	4
Govan	32.22	2	32.63	1	3.16	0	3.31	0	1.26	0	14.46	1	12.98	0	4
Pollokshields	24.19	1	40.93	1	22.15	1	8.04	0	2.91	0	0.57	0	1.20	0	3
Langside	35.80	1	37.61	1	7.38	0	8.50	1	7.25	0	1.03	0	2.42	0	3
Southside Central	44.3	2	35.81	2	2.50	0	6.40	0	0.79	0	0.0	0	10.19	0	4
Calton	54.6	2	30	1	2.6	0	3.0	0	0.9	0	2.9	0	6	0	3
Anderston/City	50.3	2	29.6	1	4.7	0	10.5	1	1.7	0	0.4	0	2.9	0	4
Hillhead	29.45	2	33.06	1	6.54	0	17.62	1	4.10	0	0.22	0	9.01	0	4
Partick West	32.1	1	33.5	2	10.33	0	14.71	1	5.54	0	0.29	0	3.53	0	4
Garscadden/Scotstounhill	61.6	3	27.1	1	2.6	0	2.7	0	1.1	0	0.3	0	4.6	0	4
Drumchapel/Anniesland	61.36	3	29.26	1	3.62	0	2.63	0	1.96	0	0.30	0	0.87	0	4
Maryhill/Kelvin	39.6	2	34.4	2	7.7	0	7.3	0	9.2	0	0.0	0.0	1.9	0	4
Canal	44.5	2	31.27	1	2.34	0	9.27	1	1.84	0	0.54	0	10.23	0	4
Springburn	57.7	2	30	1	2.7	0	1.5	0	1.1	0	0.5	0	6.4	0	3
East Centre	58.6	3	27.7	1	4.0	0	4.8	0	0.9	0	0.6	0	3.4	0	4
Shettleston	60.5	3	30.9	1	4.2	0	1.5	0	0.7	0	1.4	0	0.9	0	4
Baillieston	50.8	2	37.2	2	5.2	0	1.8	0	0.8	0	1.8	0	2.4	0	4
North East	63.61	3	29.65	1	3.13	0	1.76	0	1.13	0	0.00	0	0.72	0	4
Total	46.72	44	32.57	27	5.94	1	5.55	5	2.93	1	1.76	1	4.53	0	79

== Ward results ==
=== Ward 1: Linn ===
Linn – 4 seats
Party	Candidate	FPv%	Count							
Party	Candidate	FPv%	1	2	3	4	5	6	7	8
Labour	Malcolm Cunning	25.14%	1,858							
Labour	Sadie Docherty (incumbent)	20.90%	1,545							
SNP	Glenn Elder	20.01%	1,479							
Liberal Democrats	Margot Clark (incumbent)	12.09%	894	938	949	961	970	1,026	1,300	1,548
SNP	Stewart McDonald	9.43%	697	736	742	751	778	851	900	
Conservative	Andrew Morrison	7.03%	520	533	534	539	546	569		
Green	Lisa Jones	2.73%	202	229	234	261	315			
TUSC	Frank Young	1.61%	119	138	142	166				
Glasgow First	Lesley Ingram	1.06%	78	111	116					
Electorate: 22,192 Valid: 7,392 Spoilt: 169 Quota: 1,479 Turnout: 34.07%

=== Ward 2: Newlands/Auldburn ===
2007: 2×Lab; 1×SNP
2012: 2×Lab; 1×SNP
2007–2012 change: No change

Newlands/Auldburn – 3 seats
Party	Candidate	FPv%	Count										
Party	Candidate	FPv%	1	2	3	4	5	6	7	8	9	10	11
Labour	Stephan Curran (incumbent)	26.03%	1,750										
SNP	Josephine Docherty	21.17%	1,423	1,426	1,431	1,440	1,446	1,460	1,515	1,595	1,699		
Labour	Emma Gillan	14.95%	1,005	1,058	1,062	1,071	1,076	1,085	1,147	1,233	1,360	1,361	1,506
SNP	Shoaib Gul	14.94%	1,004	1,005	1,006	1,008	1,009	1,010	1,042	1,068	1,097	1,110	
Conservative	Robert McElroy	10.77%	724	725	728	730	734	757	771	841			
Independent	Colin Deans (incumbent)	4.63%	311	314	319	324	362	372	422				
Green	Ben Thomson	3.61%	243	243	256	269	282	318					
Liberal Democrats	Michael O'Donnell	1.56%	105	105	105	105	107						
Independent	Craig Creighton	1.06%	71	71	74	82							
Glasgow First	Ruth Black (Note: Outgoing councillor from Craigton ward.)	0.71%	48	48	50								
TUSC	Diane Harvey	0.57%	38	38									
Electorate: 17,755 Valid: 6,722 Spoilt: 201 Quota: 1,681 Turnout: 38.98%

=== Ward 3: Greater Pollok ===
2007: 3×Lab; 1×SNP
2012: 2×Lab; 2×SNP
2007–2012 change: SNP gain one seat from Lab

Greater Pollok – 4 seats
Party	Candidate	FPv%	Count										
Party	Candidate	FPv%	1	2	3	4	5	6	7	8	9	10	11
Labour	Bill Butler	34.40%	2,462										
Labour	Rashid Hussain	13.25%	948	1,684									
SNP	David McDonald (Note: Outgoing Councillor from Baillieston ward.)	19.85%	1,421	1,472									
SNP	Shabbar Jaffri	14.18%	1,015	1,036	1,080	1,109	1,122	1,137	1,167	1,193	1,211	1,233	1,343
Glasgow First	William O'Rourke (incumbent)	5.16%	369	404	425	426	431	435	452	481	676	752	
Conservative	Chris Morgan	3.73%	267	281	287	288	310	332	338	356	369		
Glasgow First	Tommy Morrison (incumbent)	3.07%	220	250	269	271	288	295	310	347			
Green	Juliet Neal	2.11%	151	168	181	183	194	218	255				
Scottish Socialist	Ian Beattie	1.94%	139	152	163	164	168	172					
Liberal Democrats	Norman Fraser	1.12%	80	98	104	104	108						
Scottish Christian	Archie Linnegan	1.19%	85	91	95	96							
Electorate: 24,096 Valid: 7,157 Spoilt: 200 Quota: 1,432 Turnout: 30.53%

=== Ward 4: Craigton ===
2007: 2×Lab; 1×SNP; 1×Sol
2012: 2×Lab; 2×SNP
2007–2012 change: SNP gain one seat from Sol

Craigton – 4 seats
Party	Candidate	FPv%	Count									
Party	Candidate	FPv%	1	2	3	4	5	6	7	8	9	10
Labour	Matt Kerr (incumbent)	27.8	2,279									
Labour	Alistair Watson (incumbent)	25.6	2,102									
SNP	Iris Gibson (incumbent)	22.9	1,876									
SNP	Jim Torrance	8.5	700	771.8	826.7	1,004.1	1,010.7	1,025.9	1,048.7	1,128.1	1,193.8	1,434.9
Solidarity	Gail Sheridan	5.8	472	555.3	624.3	638.9	646.9	656.8	688	735.1	772.4	
Conservative	Jayne Morgan	3.6	292	316.7	330.5	333.3	365.7	391.1	411.9	431.5		
Green	Ian Ruffell	2.1	169	209.9	237.8	245	256.7	273.9	314			
Glasgow First	Gordon MacDiarmid	1.8	147	193.8	226.6	233.7	245.3	259.2				
Liberal Democrats	Isabel Nelson	0.9	76	103.2	115.5	119.7	123.7					
UKIP	Janice MacKay	1.0	86	99.7	107.2	109.7						
Electorate: 22,948 Valid: 8,199 Spoilt: 124 Quota: 1,640 Turnout: 8,439 (36.77%)

=== Ward 5: Govan ===
2007: 3×Lab; 1×SNP
2012: 2×Lab; 1×SNP; 1×Glasgow First
2007–2012 change: Glasgow First gain one seat from Lab

Govan – 4 seats
Party	Candidate	FPv%	Count												
Party	Candidate	FPv%	1	2	3	4	5	6	7	8	9	10	11	12	13
Labour	James Adams	24.94%	1,727												
SNP	Allison Hunter (incumbent)	21.09%	1,460												
Glasgow First	Stephen Dornan (incumbent) (Note: Dornan eventually joined the SNP in 2015.)	8.71%	603	626	627	631	640	643	650	679	714	722	886	1,069	1,156
Labour	Fariha Thomas	7.28%	504	728	729	730	735	740	747	788	826	873	995	1,175	1,261
SNP	Jonathan Mackie	6.40%	443	452	512	517	522	532	538	601	625	879	931	993	
No description	John Flanagan (incumbent)	9.30%	644	660	661	668	671	677	688	716	741	742	753		
Glasgow First	Shaukat Butt (incumbent)	5.75%	398	408	408	409	415	416	427	445	468	515			
SNP	Tahir Mohammed	5.14%	356	359	363	363	367	370	370	385	392				
Conservative	Harriet Murdoch	3.16%	219	222	223	223	224	242	323	339					
Green	Jesper Bach	3.31%	229	237	238	261	280	307	315						
Scottish Unionist	Alan Hughes	2.07%	143	148	148	154	154	156							
Liberal Democrats	Chris Young	1.26%	87	91	92	92	92								
Solidarity	Joyce Drummond	0.87%	60	62	62	65									
Pirate	Finlay Archibald	0.74%	51	54	54										
Electorate: 23,590 Valid: 6,924 Spoilt: 297 (4.11%) Quota: 1,385 Turnout: 7,221 (30.61%)

=== Ward 6: Pollokshields ===
2007: 1×Lab; 1×SNP; 1×Con
2012: 1×Lab; 1×SNP; 1×Con
2007–2012 change: No change

Pollokshields – 3 seats
Party	Candidate	FPv%	Count						
Party	Candidate	FPv%	1	2	3	4	5	6	7
Labour	Hanif Raja	24.19%	1,828	1,837	1,854	1,897			
SNP	Norman MacLeod	21.92%	1,657	1,662	1,671	1,702	1,703	1,865	3,181
Conservative	David Meikle (incumbent)	22.15%	1,674	1,682	1,683	1,730	1,731	1,832	1,878
SNP	Khalil Malik (incumbent)	19.01%	1,437	1,439	1,455	1,466	1,467	1,613	
Green	Patrick McAleer	8.04%	608	614	652	707	709		
Liberal Democrats	Bill Fraser	2.91%	220	224	224				
TUSC	Akhtar Khan	1.20%	91	94					
Glasgow First	Andrina Morrison	0.57%	43						
Electorate: 18,117 Valid: 7,558 Spoilt: 178 Quota: 1,890 Turnout: 42.70%

=== Ward 7: Langside ===
2007: 1×SNP; 1×Lab; 1×Lib Dem
2012: 1×SNP; 1×Lab; 1×Green
2007–2012 change: Green gain one seat from Lib Dem

Result based on original count

Langside – 3 seats
Party	Candidate	FPv%	Count							
Party	Candidate	FPv%	1	2	3	4	5	6	7	8
Labour	Archie Graham (incumbent)	35.80%	2,320							
SNP	Susan Aitken	28.12%	1,822							
Green	Liam Hainey	8.50%	551	690	705	745	834	895	1,180	1,560
SNP	Alex Hewetson	9.49%	615	692	852	859	892	929	1,059	
Liberal Democrats	Paul Coleshill (incumbent)	7.25%	470	567	575	592	606	808		
Conservative	Russell Munn	7.38%	478	512	515	517	524			
TUSC	Ronnie Stevenson	2.42%	157	213	216	238				
Glasgow First	Cayleigh Dornan	1.03%	67	116	120					
Electorate: 18,902 Valid: 6,480 Spoilt: 88 Quota: 1,621 Turnout: 34.75%

==== Recount ====
It was announced by Glasgow City Council on Thursday 10 May 2012 that Box 139, containing approximately 385 papers, was not counted in the vote despite them being registered and scanned. Permission was obtained from Glasgow Sheriff Court to examine the ballots and rerun the calculation. The two highest scoring candidates were mathematically assured of their place, however the third candidate, Liam Hainey, could have had his election overturned. After the ballots were rescanned on 16 May 2012 and the result recalculated, he retained his seat.

=== Ward 8: Southside Central ===
2007: 2×Lab; 1×SNP; 1×GRN
2012: 2×Lab; 2×SNP
2007–2012 change: SNP gain one seat from Green

Southside Central – 4 seats
Party	Candidate	FPv%	Count								
Party	Candidate	FPv%	1	2	3	4	5	6	7	8	9
Labour	James Scanlon (incumbent)	32.01%	2,226								
SNP	Jahangir Hanif (incumbent)	20.73%	1,442								
Labour	Soryia Siddique	12.29%	855	1,482							
SNP	Mhairi Hunter	15.08%	1,049	1,081	1,092	1,135	1,140	1,154	1,180	1,203	1,418
Independent	Anne-Marie Millar (incumbent)	7.68%	534	584	597	598	604	612	633	673	822
Green	Moira Crawford	6.40%	445	461	467	468	480	492	550	602	
Conservative	Thomas Connor	2.50%	174	178	179	179	186	196	208		
Scottish Socialist	Bill Bonnar	2.01%	140	148	152	152	154	155			
Liberal Democrats	David Jago	0.79%	55	60	63	63	64				
Britannica Party	Jean Douglas	0.50%	35	37	38	38					
Electorate: 22,892 Valid: 6,955 Spoilt: 284 Quota: 1,385 Turnout: 7,239 (31.62%)

=== Ward 9: Calton ===
2007: 2×Lab; 1×SNP
2012: 2×Lab; 1×SNP
2007–2012 change: No change

Calton – 3 seats
Party	Candidate	FPv%	Count												
Party	Candidate	FPv%	1	2	3	4	5	6	7	8	9	10	11	12	13
Labour	George Redmond (incumbent)	35.0	1,595												
Labour	Yvonne Kucuk	19.6	892	1,220.9											
SNP	Alison Thewliss (incumbent)	15.3	695	714.1	720.2	720.2	726.2	737.2	747.9	757.8	762.8	782.3	800.7	855.6	1,449.8
SNP	Alexander Belic	14.7	672	681.9	688.7	690.7	692.1	699.1	701.5	718.6	721.2	740.2	756.6	779.8	
Green	Andy Reid	3.0	135	140.9	145.9	148.3	151.2	162.4	176.5	180.8	189.3	208.1	231.7		
Conservative	Scott Gillespie	2.6	120	123.4	124.9	125.9	127.9	127.9	135.8	138.8	184.3	193.8			
Glasgow First	Duncan Miller	2.9	131	141.8	146.6	146.6	149.2	151.5	151.7	151.9	181.3				
Scottish Unionist	Gordon Kirker	2.4	109	118.9	121	124	125	126.4	126.4	129.4					
No description	Gary Barton	1.6	71	74.4	76.4	76.4	81.5	81.6	82.7						
Liberal Democrats	Harvey Sussock	0.9	43	45.3	47.4	47.4	50.4	50.9							
Scottish Socialist	Murdo Ritchie	0.9	43	45.3	48.9	48.9	50								
Independent	Thomas Rannachan	0.9	41	43.3	45.1	45.4									
Britannica Party	Martin Clark	0.2	9	9.6	9.9										
Electorate: 18,140 Valid: 4,556 Spoilt: 191 Quota: 1,140 Turnout: 4,722 (26.03%)

=== Ward 10: Anderston/City ===
2007: 2×Lab; 1×SNP; 1×GRN
2012: 2×Lab; 1×SNP; 1×GRN
2007–2012 change: No change

Anderston/City – 4 seats
Party	Candidate	FPv%	Count										
Party	Candidate	FPv%	1	2	3	4	5	6	7	8	9	10	11
Labour	Philip Braat (incumbent)	29.4	1,561										
Labour	Gordon Matheson (incumbent)	20.9	1,113										
SNP	Martin Docherty	19.9	1,057	1,122.3									
Green	Nina Baker (incumbent)	10.5	558	652.2	656.6	662.6	665.6	676.2	704.3	753.2	809	891.8	1,163.5
SNP	Craig MacKay (incumbent)	9.7	516	541.5	587.8	592.3	592.3	596	605.5	628.4	645.2	683.3	
Conservative	David Barnes	4.7	249	273.5	274.4	276.3	279.3	280.8	283.9	283.9	314.3		
Liberal Democrats	Ewan Hoyle	1.7	89	112.9	113.9	116	117.3	120	126.4	129.4			
Solidarity	Graham Campbell	1.7	89	110.9	112.1	113.2	113.2	115.3	118.3				
Pirate	Rob Harris	0.9	46	53.9	54.4	54.8	58.5	60.9					
Glasgow First	Alexander McDowell	0.4	20	30.8	31.2	32.4	36						
Britannica Party	James Moir Robertson	0.3	17	19.2	19.2	19.4							
Electorate: 23,063 Valid: 5,315 Spoilt: 191 Quota: 1,064 Turnout: 5,442 (23.60%)

=== Ward 11: Hillhead ===
2007: 1×SNP; 1×GRN; 1×Lib Dem; 1×Lab
2012: 1×SNP; 1×GRN; 2×Lab
2007–2012 change: Labour gain one seat from Lib Dem

Hillhead – 4 seats
Party	Candidate	FPv%	Count												
Party	Candidate	FPv%	1	2	3	4	5	6	7	8	9	10	11	12	13
SNP	Ken Andrew (incumbent)	24.62%	1,424												
Green	Martha Wardrop (incumbent)	17.62%	1,019	1,037	1,037	1,039	1,049	1,055	1,099	1,185					
Labour	Martin McElroy	17.31%	1,001	1,015	1,018	1,019	1,023	1,030	1,041	1,068	1,071	1,129	1,211		
Labour	Pauline McKeever	12.14%	702	709	710	711	712	712	720	741	746	799	835	880	1,019
SNP	Mark Smith	8.44%	488	676	676	678	682	683	690	711	720	780	826	827	
Conservative	Alexander Inglis	6.54%	378	380	383	386	394	413	415	464	465	541			
Independent	Ruth Simpson	5.79%	335	340	340	340	343	355	356	386	391				
Liberal Democrats	Kenneth Elder (incumbent)	4.10%	237	244	245	248	252	255	259						
Scottish Socialist	Frances Curran	1.42%	82	86	86	86	87	89							
UKIP	Neil Craig	0.85%	49	51	56	57	65								
Scottish Christian	Murdo MacLeod	0.74%	43	44	44	46									
Glasgow First	Iain Firth	0.22%	13	14	15										
Britannica Party	Charles Baillie	0.21%	12	13											
Electorate: 20,981 Valid: 5,783 Spoilt: 113 Quota: 1,157 Turnout: 28.10%

=== Ward 12: Partick West ===
2007: 1×SNP; 1×Lib Dem; 1×Lab; 1×GRN
2012: 2×SNP; 1×Lab; 1×GRN
2007–2012 change: SNP gain one seat from Lib Dem

Partick West – 4 seats
Party	Candidate	FPv%	Count												
Party	Candidate	FPv%	1	2	3	4	5	6	7	8	9	10	11	12	13
Labour	Aileen Colleran (incumbent) (Note: On 2 October 2014, Colleran resigned from Scottish Labour amid fallout from that year's Scottish independence referendum. She continued to sit on the council as an independent.)	19.97%	1,884	1,885	1,890										
Green	Martin Bartos	14.71%	1,388	1,388	1,392	1,392	1,395	1,409	1,418	1,478	1,662	1,946			
SNP	Feargal Dalton	18.63%	1,757	1,757	1,758	1,758	1,759	1,760	1,767	1,776	1,813	1,913			
SNP	Kenny McLean (incumbent)	14.87%	1,403	1,403	1,403	1,403	1,405	1,410	1,421	1,434	1,479	1,538	1,553	1,575	1,813
Labour	Michael Shanks	12.13%	1,144	1,144	1,147	1,149	1,153	1,156	1,167	1,190	1,258	1,380	1,394	1,395	
Conservative	John Anderson	10.33%	974	977	979	979	995	1,017	1,041	1,041	1,161				
Liberal Democrats	James Paris	5.54%	523	525	526	526	532	534	540	540					
Scottish Socialist	Andrew Gray	1.19%	112	112	113	113	113	113	114						
Scottish Christian	Donald Williamson	0.96%	91	91	91	91	95	102							
UKIP	Stuart Maskell	0.68%	64	65	65	65	77								
Scottish Unionist	Catherine Findlay	0.43%	41	59	60	60									
Glasgow First	Nicholas Black	0.29%	27	27											
Scottish Unionist	Robert Findlay	0.27%	25												
Electorate: 25,686 Valid: 9,433 Spoilt: 198 Quota: 1,887 Turnout: 9,631 (37.50%)

=== Ward 13: Garscadden/Scotstounhill ===
2007: 3×Lab; 1×SNP
2012: 3×Lab; 1×SNP
2007–2012 change: No change

Garscadden/Scotstounhill – 4 seats
Party	Candidate	FPv%	Count												
Party	Candidate	FPv%	1	2	3	4	5	6	7	8	9	10	11	12	13
Labour	Liz Cameron (incumbent)	28.0	2,295												
Labour	Paul Rooney (incumbent)	27.0	2,220												
SNP	Graeme Hendry (incumbent)	22.2	1,820												
Labour	John Kelly	6.6	541	993.4	1,417	1,422.1	1,427.4	1,432.9	1,439.4	1,459.3	1,491.9	1,512.2	1,541.4	1,606.6	1,712.3
SNP	David Wilson	4.9	400	430.4	465.1	604.1	609.1	612.4	620.6	632	654.8	689.1	716	791.5	
Green	Martin Schmierer	2.7	221	240.6	252.1	259.6	263.9	273.8	279.3	303	309.3	350.6	400.8		
Conservative	Susan McCourt	2.6	215	226.7	231.6	233.5	235.9	235.9	249.9	267.9	286.7	311.6			
Independent	Phil Jarvis	1.8	151	164.7	174	176.9	177.8	180	205	211.2	239.2				
Scottish Christian	John Cormack	1.6	135	149.2	154.7	156.7	156.7	157.7	164.1	169.2					
Liberal Democrats	James Speirs	1.1	90	98.3	103.5	105.7	106.8	109.8	112.5						
UKIP	Ian Cumming	0.8	69	80.4	84	86.4	86.7	89.7							
TUSC	Ryan Stuart	0.4	29	31.6	32.3	32.5	35.2								
Glasgow First	Mark Muir	0.3	22	23.9	27.6	28.4									
Electorate: 21,743 Valid: 8,208 Spoilt: 258 Quota: 1,642 Turnout: 8,466 (39.94%)

=== Ward 14: Drumchapel/Anniesland ===
2007: 3×Lab; 1×SNP
2012: 3×Lab; 1×SNP
2007–2012 change: No change

Drumchapel/Anniesland – 4 seats
Party	Candidate	FPv%	Count									
Party	Candidate	FPv%	1	2	3	4	5	6	7	8	9	10
Labour	Paul Carey (incumbent)	30.65%	2,075									
Labour	Jon Findlay (incumbent)	17.70%	1,198	1,552								
SNP	Malcolm Balfour	19.82%	1,342	1,388								
Labour	Judith Fisher	13.01%	881	1,079	1,235	1,236	1,241	1,243	1,247	1,274	1,328	1,378
SNP	John Docherty	9.44%	639	665	676	705	709	713	717	747	807	854
Conservative	Martyn McIntyre	3.62%	245	248	251	252	253	255	260	292	315	
Green	Alastair Whitelaw	2.63%	178	183	187	188	196	199	216	251		
Liberal Democrats	Paul McGarry	1.96%	133	139	142	143	143	146	150			
Independent	James Trolland	0.50%	34	34	35	35	39	45				
Glasgow First	Gerrard O'Neill McCue	0.30%	20	26	28	28	30					
TUSC	Eric Stevenson	0.37%	25	26	27	27						
Electorate: 21,288 Valid: 6,770 Spoilt: 180 Quota: 1,355 Turnout: 32.65%

=== Ward 15: Maryhill/Kelvin ===
2007: 2×Lab; 1×SNP; 1×Lib Dem
2012: 2×Lab; 2×SNP;
2007–2012 change: SNP gain one seat from Lib Dem

Maryhill/Kelvin – 4 seats
Party	Candidate	FPv%	Count							
Party	Candidate	FPv%	1	2	3	4	5	6	7	8
Labour	Martin Rhodes	23.6%	1,792							
SNP	John Letford	23.2%	1,761							
Labour	Mohammed Razaq (incumbent)	16.0%	1,215	1,425	1,436	1,466	1,509	1,652		
SNP	Franny Scally	11.2%	854	863	1,044	1,073	1,098	1,260	1,283	1,574
Liberal Democrats	Alex Dingwall (incumbent)	9.2%	703	715	724	733	1,007	1,217	1,236	
Green	Steen Parish	7.3%	555	564	580	645	716			
Conservative	Euan Erskine	7.7%	582	585	589	593				
Scottish Socialist	Liam Turbett	1.9%	143	146	148					
Electorate: 22,610 Valid: 7,605 Spoilt: 179 Quota: 1,522 Turnout: 34.43%

=== Ward 16: Canal ===
2007: 2×Lab; 1×SNP; 1×GRN
2012: 2×Lab; 1×SNP; 1×GRN
2007–2012 change: No change

Canal – 4 seats
Party	Candidate	FPv%	Count											
Party	Candidate	FPv%	1	2	3	4	5	6	7	8	9	10	11	12
Labour	Chris Kelly (Note: On 21 November 2016, Kelly resigned from the council to take up a politically restricted position at HMRC. No by-election was called due to the resignation's proximity to the May 2017 elections.)	29.61%	1,869											
SNP	Billy McAllister (incumbent) (Note: McAllister resigned from the SNP and became an independent in April 2016, claiming that party leadership were intolerant to free speech.)	22.83%	1,441											
Labour	Helen Stephen	14.89%	940	1,424										
Green	Kieran Wild (incumbent)	9.27%	585	596	601	622	623	634	667	724	767	797	846	1,159
SNP	Gavin Roberts	8.44%	533	547	696	708	709	715	735	747	758	775	813	
Socialist Labour	Jim Berrington	4.29%	271	289	293	310	311	313	342	345	351	372		
Scottish Unionist	Brian Brown	3.91%	247	254	256	261	275	278	290	292	332			
Conservative	Margaret Walker	2.34%	148	151	151	154	157	160	160	184				
Liberal Democrats	Caroline Johnston	1.84%	116	119	121	126	126	127	129					
TUSC	Angela McCormick	1.70%	107	113	116	121	122	127						
Glasgow First	Fay Dornan	0.54%	34	36	38	41	43							
Scottish Unionist	Graham Nicholls	0.33%	21	24	25	27								
Electorate: 23,679 Valid: 6,312 Spoilt: 255 Quota: 1,263 Turnout: 27.73 %

=== Ward 17: Springburn ===
2007: 2×Lab; 1×SNP
2012: 2×Lab; 1×SNP
2007–2012 change: No change

Springburn – 3 seats
Party	Candidate	FPv%	Count								
Party	Candidate	FPv%	1	2	3	4	5	6	7	8	9
Labour	Gilbert Davidson	40.5	1,643								
Labour	Allan Stewart (incumbent)	17.2	699	1,184.4							
SNP	Phil Greene (incumbent)	21.9	888	932.6	948	949	951.1	960.4	971.1	978.5	1,039.5
SNP	James Oakes	8.1	330	342.6	349.7	351.8	353.9	355.5	372.8	384.9	419.8
Independent	Joe Chambers	5.9	240	257.2	273.	278.9	283.1	295.2	316.5	343.3	
Conservative	Jason Eccles	2.7	111	115.9	120.6	120.6	122.1	134.2	139.3		
Green	John Stuart	1.5	61	65.6	76.8	87.6	92.1	101			
Liberal Democrats	Sophie Bridger	1.1	45	49.6	53.9	53.9	61.5				
Glasgow First	Christopher Henderson	0.5	21	28.3	35.8	36.1					
TUSC	Luke Ivory	0.5	22	24.3	26.9						
Electorate: 15,717 Valid: 4,060 Spoilt: 191 Quota: 1,016 Turnout: 4,251 (27.05%)

=== Ward 18: East Centre ===
2007: 3×Lab; 1×SNP
2012: 3×Lab; 1×SNP
2007–2012 changes: No change

East Centre – 4 seats
Party	Candidate	FPv%	Count										
Party	Candidate	FPv%	1	2	3	4	5	6	7	8	9	10	11
Labour	Frank Docherty (incumbent)	26.4	1,846										
SNP	Jennifer Dunn (incumbent)	21.8	1,523										
Labour	Elaine McDougall (incumbent)	18.2	1,272	1,581.4									
Labour	Russell Robertson (Note: Robertson defected from the Labour Party and joined the SNP in February 2016.)	14.0	981	1,043.9	1,176.6	1,179.7	1,184.6	1,199.6	1,207.6	1,245.7	1,285.1	1,383.5	1,527.7
SNP	Colin Rullkotter	5.9	414	423.2	427.3	523.5	526.5	532.6	540	566.3	605	735.5	
Green	Nina Ballantyne	4.8	335	351	356.5	363.6	371.5	390.3	404.8	460.9	520.8		
Conservative	Keenan Alexander	4.0	280	283.4	285.3	286.6	288.9	302.7	328.1	334.5			
Scottish Socialist	Daniel O'Donnell	2.2	154	159.3	162.2	166.1	168.2	171.5	176.8				
UKIP	Steven Laird	1.2	82	84.2	85.3	86.5	94.6	94.9					
Liberal Democrats	Alan Lee	0.9	62	66.4	67.4	69.3	74.9						
Glasgow First	Fraser Paterson	0.6	39	42.9	45.8	47							
Electorate: 22,939 Valid: 6,988 Spoilt: 198 Quota: 1,398 Turnout: 7,186 (31.33%)

=== Ward 19: Shettleston ===
2007: 3×Lab; 1×SNP
2012: 3×Lab; 1×SNP
2007–2012 change: No change

Shettleston – 4 seats
Party	Candidate	FPv%	Count								
Party	Candidate	FPv%	1	2	3	4	5	6	7	8	9
Labour	Frank McAveety	28.3	1,989								
Labour	George Ryan (incumbent)	20.1	1,415								
SNP	John McLaughlin (incumbent)	17.8	1,251	1,283.1	1,283.2	1,285.2	1,288.8	1,301.1	1,331.4	1,358.4	2,168.1
Labour	Anne Simpson	12.1	852	1,289.1	1,293.9	1,300.9	1,317.8	1,333.6	1,359.8	1,400.5	1,444.9
SNP	Adam Miller	13.1	921	937.9	938.1	942.1	950.4	964.9	980.9	1,006.2	
Conservative	Alan Sullivan	4.2	294	298.9	299	313.3	314.3	332.9	344.9		
Green	Stuart Leckie	1.5	105	115.5	115.6	126.6	144.1	165.3			
Glasgow First	Andy Muir	1.4	98	109.7	109.7	111	119.3				
Scottish Socialist	Colin Rutherford	0.9	63	69.1	69.2	71.2					
Liberal Democrats	Marjory Watt	0.7	52	52.9	52.9						
Electorate: 21,408 Valid: 7,040 Spoilt: 174 Quota: 1,409 Turnout: 7,214 (33.70%)

=== Ward 20: Baillieston ===
2007: 2×Lab; 2×SNP
2012: 2×Lab; 2×SNP
2007–2012 changes: No change

Baillieston – 4 seats
Party	Candidate	FPv%	Count								
Party	Candidate	FPv%	1	2	3	4	5	6	7	8	9
Labour	Jim Coleman (incumbent)	36.3%	2,894								
SNP	David Turner (incumbent)	20.2%	1,615								
Labour	Marie Garrity	14.5%	1,154	2,233							
SNP	Austin Sheridan	17%	1,357	1,395	1,463	1,478	1,493	1,505	1,529	1,572	1,636
Conservative	Raymond McCrae	5.2%	413	424	451	451	466	486	492	504	538
Glasgow First	Andy Muir (incumbent)	1.8%	146	175	226	227	234	252	280	346	
Green	David Weir	1.8%	143	153	202	203	218	236	269		
Scottish Socialist	Margaret Bean	1.3%	103	115	160	161	164	168			
UKIP	Arthur Thackeray	1.1%	91	96	106	107	109				
Liberal Democrats	James McHale	0.8%	65	70	92	92					
Electorate: 24,426 Valid: 7,981 Spoilt: 203 Quota: 1,597 Turnout: 33.51%

=== Ward 21: North East ===
2007: 3×Lab; 1×SNP
2012: 3×Lab; 1×SNP
2007–2012 changes: No change

North East – 4 seats
Party	Candidate	FPv%	Count	
Party	Candidate	FPv%	1	2
Labour	Maureen Burke	29.18%	1,958	
SNP	Gerry Boyle	20.53%	1,378	
Labour	Gerry Leonard (incumbent)	20.04%	1,345	
Labour	Sohan Singh	14.39%	966	1,411
SNP	Tony Kenny	9.12%	612	647
Conservative	Kim Schmulian	3.13%	210	215
Green	Stuart Clay (Note: Outgoing councillor from Partick West ward.)	1.76%	118	141
Liberal Democrats	John C. MacPherson	1.13%	76	85
TUSC	Jamie Cocozza	0.72%	48	58
Electorate: 25,247 Valid: 6,711 Spoilt: 242 Quota: 1,343 Turnout: 27.54%

== By-elections since 2013 ==
=== October 2013 Govan by-election ===
On 23 July 2013 SNP councillor Allison Hunter died from cancer. A by-election was held on 10 October 2013 and was won by Labour's John Kane.

Govan by-election (10 October 2013) - 1 Seat
Party	Candidate	FPv%	Count												
Party	Candidate	FPv%	1	2	3	4	5	6	7	8	9	10	11	12	13
Labour	John Kane	43.4	2,055	2,055	2,056	2,058	2,062	2,075	2,082	2,108	2,137	2,149	2,180	2,216	2,417
SNP	Helen Walker	30.1	1,424	1,425	1,426	1,431	1,435	1,449	1,456	1,466	1,485	1,497	1,541	1,575	1,678
No Bedroom Tax	John Flanagan	9.4	446	446	449	455	466	479	483	487	501	515	539	562	
Conservative	Richard Sullivan	4.5	215	215	216	216	216	218	229	237	243	269	293		
UKIP	Janice MacKay	2.4	113	113	116	116	116	116	119	120	126				
Green	Moira Crawford	2.4	112	112	113	116	125	129	131	142	150	158			
Independent	George Laird	2.2	103	102	102	104	104	105	113	117					
Liberal Democrats	Ewan Hoyle	1.5	73	73	74	75	76	76	84						
Scottish Christian	John Cormack	1.3	60	60	61	62	65	65							
Independent	Thomas Rannachan	1.1	52	52	52	52	53								
Communist	Ryan Boyle	0.7	35	35	35	37									
Solidarity	Joyce Drummond	0.6	28	28	29										
Britannica Party	Charles Baillie	0.4	19												
SDA	James Trolland	0.0	1												
Electorate: 24,203 Valid: 4,736 Spoilt: 120 Quota: 2,369 Turnout: 4,856 (20.06%)

=== December 2013 Shettleston by-election ===
On 7 October 2013 Shettleston Labour councillor George Ryan died suddenly. A by-election was held on 5 December 2013 and the seat was retained by Labour's Martin Neill.

Shettleston by-election (5 December 2013) - 1 Seat
Party	Candidate	FPv%	Count
Party	Candidate	FPv%	1
Labour	Martin Neill	53.6	2,026
SNP	Laura Docherty	28.7	1,086
Conservative	Raymond McCrae	5.9	224
UKIP	Arthur Misty Thackeray	3.4	129
TUSC	Jamie Cocozza	1.8	68
Liberal Democrats	James Speirs	1.4	53
No Bedroom Tax	John Flanagan	1.3	50
Green	Alasdair Duke	1.1	41
Scottish Socialist	Tommy Ball	0.9	35
Christian	Victor Murphy	0.9	34
Britannica Party	Charlie Baillie	0.8	31
SDA	James Trolland	0.2	6
Electorate: 21,926 Valid: 3,783 Spoilt: 65 Quota: 1,892 Turnout: 3,777 (17.55)

=== August 2015 by-elections ===
On 14 May 2015, Green Party councillor Liam Hainey (Langside) resigned his seat for family and health reasons. On the same day, SNP councillors Alison Thewliss (Calton) and Martin Docherty (Anderston/City) resigned their seats after having been elected as MPs for the constituencies of, respectively, Glasgow Central and West Dunbartonshire. Finally, on 10 June 2015, SNP councillor Iris Gibson (Craigton) retired due to ill health. By-elections for all of these were held on 6 August 2015.

Anderston/City by-election (6 August 2015) - 1 Seat
Party	Candidate	FPv%	Count					
Party	Candidate	FPv%	1	2	3	4	5	6
SNP	Eva Bolander	48.1%	1,441	1,444	1,446	1,457	1,473	1,750
Labour	Katie Ford	28.6%	857	857	866	881	943	1,024
Green	Christy Mearns	13.8%	414	414	421	442	467	
Conservative	Ary Jaff	5.5%	164	166	173	184		
Liberal Democrats	Gary McLelland	2.2%	66	68	70			
UKIP	Janice MacKay	1.4%	43	45				
Scottish Libertarian	Stevie Creighton	0.4%	12					
Electorate: 23,285 Valid: 2,997 Spoilt: 39 Quota: 1,499 Turnout: 3,036 (14.5%)

Calton by-election (6 August 2015) - 1 Seat
Party	Candidate	FPv%	Count
Party	Candidate	FPv%	1
SNP	Greg Hepburn	55.5%	1,507
Labour	Thomas Rannachan	30.0%	814
Conservative	Thomas Kerr	4.7%	129
UKIP	Karen King	3.8%	103
Green	Malachy Clarke	3.6%	99
Independent	Tommy Ramsay	1.7%	47
Liberal Democrats	Chris Young	0.7%	18
Electorate: 19,333 Valid: 2,717 Spoilt: 50 Quota: 1,359 Turnout: 2,767 (16.17%)

Craigton by-election (6 August 2015) - 1 Seat
Party	Candidate	FPv%	Count
Party	Candidate	FPv%	1
SNP	Alex Wilson	54.2%	2,674
Labour	Kevin O'Donnell	33.3%	1,643
Conservative	Philip Charles	6.1%	300
Green	Katie Noble	2.8%	136
UKIP	Arthur Misty Thackeray	1.9%	95
Liberal Democrats	Isabel Nelson	1.8%	87
Electorate: 24,119 Valid: 4,935 Spoilt: 71 Quota: 2,468 Turnout: 5,006 (21.64%)

Langside by-election (6 August 2015) - 1 Seat
Party	Candidate	FPv%	Count	
Party	Candidate	FPv%	1	2
SNP	Anna Richardson	49.9%	2134	2,143
Labour	Eileen Dinning	21.8%	932	945
Green	Robert Pollock	13.5%	579	598
Conservative	Kyle Thornton	8.9%	379	379
Liberal Democrats	Will Millinship	2.9%	125	125
UKIP	Cailean Mongan	1.5%	65	66
TUSC	Ian Leech	1.4%	62	
Electorate: 20,938 Valid: 4,276 Spoilt: 27 Quota: 2,139 Turnout: 4,303 (21.7%)

=== May 2016 Anderston/City by-election ===
On 14 March 2016, Labour councillor Matheson resigned his seat as he had been appointed a visiting professor at Strathclyde University. As a result, a by-election happened on 5 May 2016: it was won by the SNP's Angus Millar.

Anderston/City by-election (5 May 2016) - 1 Seat
Party	Candidate	FPv%	Count				
Party	Candidate	FPv%	1	2	3	4	5
SNP	Angus Millar	43.03%	3,467	3,480	3,509	3,586	4,436
Labour	Steven Livingston	21.07%	1,698	1,715	1,793	2,112	2,603
Green	Christy Mearns	20.12%	1,621	1,637	1,710	1,869	
Conservative	Philip Charles	10.79%	869	908	965		
Liberal Democrats	Ryan Ross	3.08%	248	256			
UKIP	Karen King	1.91%	154				
Electorate: 20,995 Valid: 8,057 Spoilt: 133 Quota: 4,030 Turnout: 8,190 (39.18%)

=== October 2016 Garscadden/Scotstounhill by-election ===
On 25 July 2016, Labour councillor John Kelly died as a result of motor neuron disease. A by-election was held on 6 October 2016 and was won by the SNP's Chris Cunningham.

Garscadden/Scotstounhill by-election (6 October 2016) - 1 Seat
Party	Candidate	FPv%	Count					
Party	Candidate	FPv%	1	2	3	4	5	6
SNP	Chris Cunningham	42.6%	2,135	2,140	2,150	2,275	2,321	2,906
Labour	Ian Cruikshank	38.8%	1,944	1,953	1,984	2,037	2,204	
Conservative	Ary Jaff	10.2%	510	536	553	564		
Green	Gillian MacDonald	4.8%	242	247	261			
Liberal Democrats	James Speirs	1.9%	97	105				
UKIP	Donald MacKay	1.7%	83					
Electorate: 21,419 Valid: 5,011 Spoilt: 83 Quota: 2,506 Turnout: 5,094 (23.8%)
