= Southside Central (ward) =

Electoral ward in Glasgow, Scotland

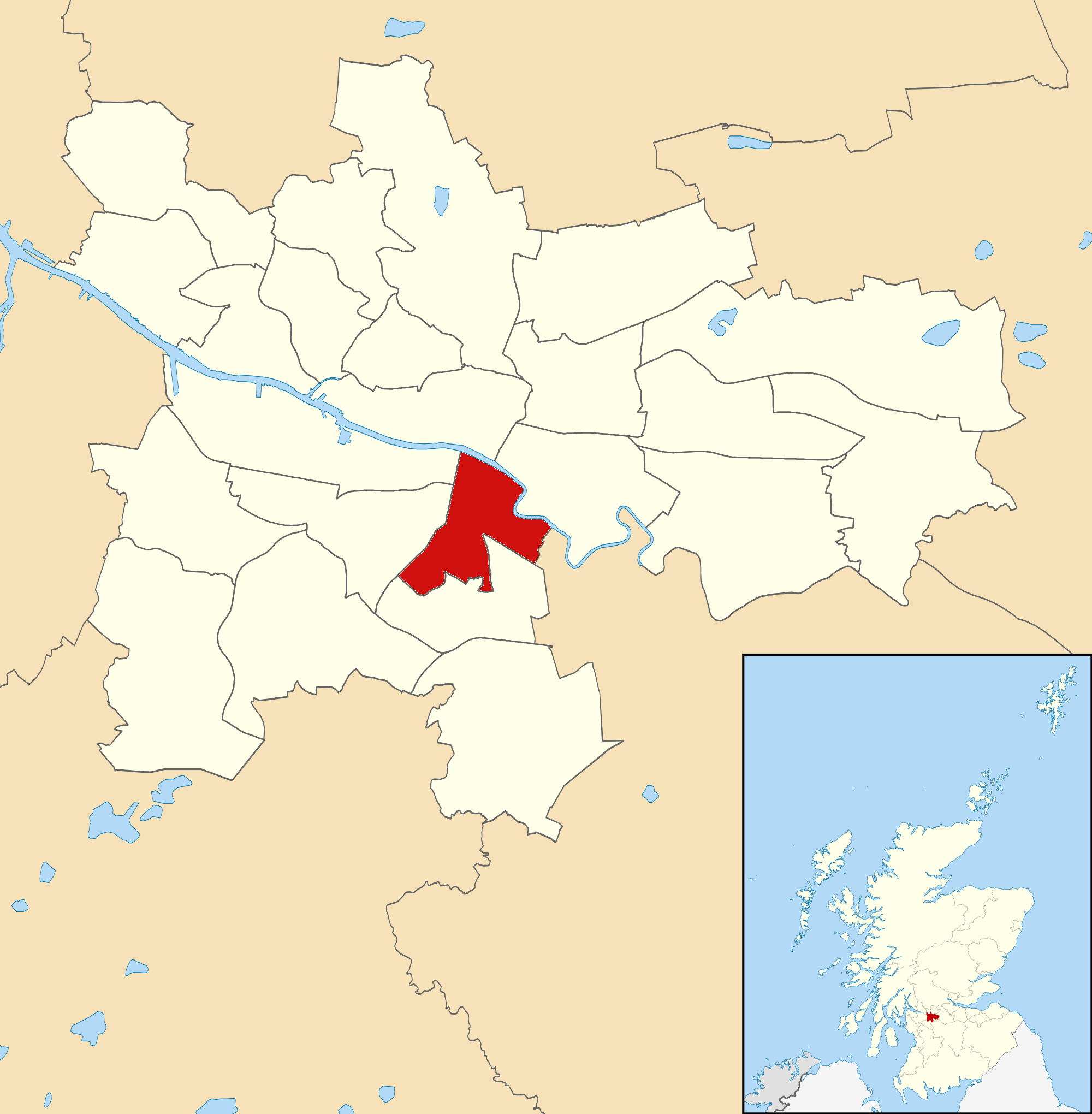
- Southside Central ward (2017) within Glasgow

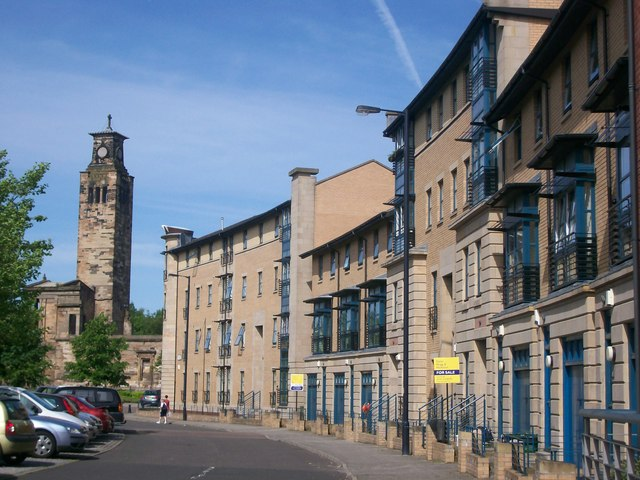
- Alexander Crescent in the New Gorbals in the Southside Central ward
- Area: 4.29 km^{2} (1.66 sq mi)
- Population: 25,266 (2017)
  - Density: 5,889.5/km^{2} (15,254/sq mi)
- Council area: Glasgow City Council
- Lieutenancy area: Glasgow
- Country: Scotland
- Sovereign state: United Kingdom
- Post town: GLASGOW
- Postcode district: G41, G42, G5
- Dialling code: 0141
- Police: Scotland
- Fire: Scottish
- Ambulance: Scottish

Southside Central (Ward 8) is one of the 23 wards of Glasgow City Council. On its creation in 2007 and in 2012 it returned four council members, using the single transferable vote system. For the 2017 Glasgow City Council election, the boundaries were changed, the ward population decreased but it continued to return four members.

== Boundaries ==
The ward is located immediately south of Glasgow city centre, with the River Clyde forming its northern boundary. Areas within the ward include the Gorbals, Hutchesontown, Govanhill, Queen's Park, Crosshill and Oatlands. The 2017 changes saw the Toryglen area being re-assigned to Langside ward.

The ethnic makeup of the smaller Southside Central ward using the 2011 census population statistics was:

- 74.6% White Scottish / British / Irish / Other
- 20.2% Asian (Mainly Pakistani)
- 3.4% Black (Mainly African)
- 1.8% Mixed / Other Ethnic Group

== Councillors ==
Election	Councillors			
2007	Anne Marie Millar (Labour)	James Scanlon (Labour)	Dannie Alderslowe (Green)	Jahangir Hanlif (SNP)
2012	Soryia Siddique (Labour)	James Scanlon (Labour)	Mhairi Hunter (SNP)	Jahangir Hanlif (SNP)
2017	Soryia Siddique (Labour)	James Scanlon (Labour)	Mhairi Hunter (SNP)	Alexander Belic (SNP)
2022	Soryia Siddique (Labour)	James Scanlon (Labour)	Elaine Gallagher (Green)	Alexander Belic (SNP)
2025	Soryia Siddique (Labour)	Mhairi Hunter (SNP)	Elaine Gallagher (Green)	Alexander Belic (SNP)

== Election results ==
=== 2025 election ===
Southside Central by-election (20 March 2025) − 1 seat
Party	Candidate	FPv%	Count							
Party	Candidate	FPv%	1	2	3	4	5	6	7	8
SNP	Mhairi Hunter	30.0	1,126	1,129	1,132	1,159	1,187	1,243	1,775	2,305
Labour	Samina Rashid	27.4	1,027	1,034	1,045	1,079	1,107	1,150	1,366	
Green	Laura Vroomen	21.5	805	805	814	837	856	994		
Scottish Socialist	Olivia Murphy	7.2	271	272	274	301	323			
Reform	Danny Raja	5.9	222	241	267	277				
Liberal Democrats	Nicholas Budgen	4.1	155	157	172					
Conservative	Kyle Park	2.7	102	105						
UKIP	Travis Power	1.1	41							
Electorate: 20,348 Valid: 3,749 Spoilt: 66 Quota: 1,875 Turnout: 18.7%

=== 2022 election ===
Southside Central – 4 seats
Party	Candidate	FPv%	Count							
Party	Candidate	FPv%	1	2	3	4	5	6	7	8
SNP	Alexander Belic (incumbent)	18.9	1,460	1,462	1,467	1,485	1,491	1,615		
Green	Elaine Gallagher	18.1	1,395	1,405	1,431	1,504	1,522	1,544		
Labour	Soryia Siddique (incumbent)	16.5	1,271	1,274	1,288	1,299	1,341	1,513	1,518	1,743
SNP	Mhairi Hunter (incumbent)	15.4	1,185	1,188	1,193	1,201	1,204	1,237	1,289	
Labour	James Scanlon (incumbent)	15.0	1,161	1,164	1,183	1,196	1,298	1,338	1,342	1,594
Alba	Kamran Butt	8.1	623	624	628	638	664			
Conservative	Tariq Parvez	4.1	317	317	329	330				
Scottish Socialist	Paul Robert Donnelly	2.0	154	160	161					
Liberal Democrats	Sam Glasgow-Jackson	1.4	110	112						
Independent	Jamie Dyer	0.5	41							
Electorate: 20,537 Valid: 7,717 Spoilt: 296 Quota: 1,544 Turnout: 39.0%

=== 2017 election ===
Southside Central – 4 seats
Party	Candidate	FPv%	Count									
Party	Candidate	FPv%	1	2	3	4	5	6	7	8	9	10
SNP	Mhairi Hunter (incumbent)	17.74%	1,287	1,292	1,298	1,301	1,309	1,637				
Labour	Soryia Siddique (incumbent)	18.35%	1,331	1,334	1,356	1,361	1,408	1,508				
SNP	Alexander Belic	17.15%	1,244	1,249	1,252	1,258	1,271	1,353	1,500			
Labour	James Scanlon (incumbent)	16.40%	1,190	1,194	1,216	1,237	1,383	1,393	1,398	1,434	1,439	1,886
Green	Cass MacGregor	11.29%	819	829	856	870	944	971	991	995	1,012	
SNP	Qasim Hanif	8.55%	620	623	623	624	627					
Conservative	Gordon Fraser	6.69%	486	500	509	552						
UKIP	Lorraine Duncan	1.59%	115	120	126							
Liberal Democrats	Chris Young	1.43%	104	110								
Independent	Mark Fiddy	0.81%	59									
Electorate: 18,946 Valid: 7,255 Spoilt: 316 Quota: 1,452 Turnout: 40.0%

=== 2012 election ===
Southside Central – 4 seats
Party	Candidate	FPv%	Count								
Party	Candidate	FPv%	1	2	3	4	5	6	7	8	9
Labour	James Scanlon (incumbent)	32.01%	2,226								
SNP	Jahangir Hanif (incumbent)	20.73%	1,442								
Labour	Soryia Siddique	12.29%	855	1,482							
SNP	Mhairi Hunter	15.08%	1,049	1,081	1,092	1,135	1,140	1,154	1,180	1,203	1,418
Independent	Anne-Marie Millar (incumbent)	7.68%	534	584	597	598	604	612	633	673	822
Green	Moira Crawford	6.40%	445	461	467	468	480	492	550	602	
Conservative	Thomas Connor	2.50%	174	178	179	179	186	196	208		
Scottish Socialist	Bill Bonnar	2.01%	140	148	152	152	154	155			
Liberal Democrats	David Jago	0.79%	55	60	63	63	64				
Britannica Party	Jean Douglas	0.50%	35	37	38	38					
Electorate: 22,892 Valid: 6,955 Spoilt: 284 Quota: 1,385 Turnout: 7,239 (31.62%)

=== 2007 election ===
2007 Council election: Southside Central
Party	Candidate	FPv%	Count						
Party	Candidate	FPv%	1	2	3	4	5	6	7
SNP	Jahangir Hanif	27.37	2,392						
Labour	Anne Marie Millar (Note: Outgoing councillor for Govanhill single-member ward.)†††††††	21.39	1,869						
Labour	James Scanlon (Note: Outgoing councillor for Toryglen single-member ward.)	15.70	1,372	1,392	1,429	1,448	1,473	1,537	1,915
Green	Danny Alderslowe	9.29	812	895	900	967	1,072	1,284	1,326
Liberal Democrats	Katy McCloskey	6.10	533	590	596	705	761	831	865
Labour	Hanif Raja	6.34	554	613	651	668	690	748	
Solidarity	Jill McGowan	5.22	456	522	526	537	644		
Scottish Socialist	Rosie Kane	3.74	327	453	456	473			
Conservative	John B Marshall	4.84	423	441	443				
Electorate: 22,863 Valid: 8,738 Spoilt: 235 Quota: 1,748 Turnout: 39.25%

== See also ==
- Wards of Glasgow
