= Langside (ward) =

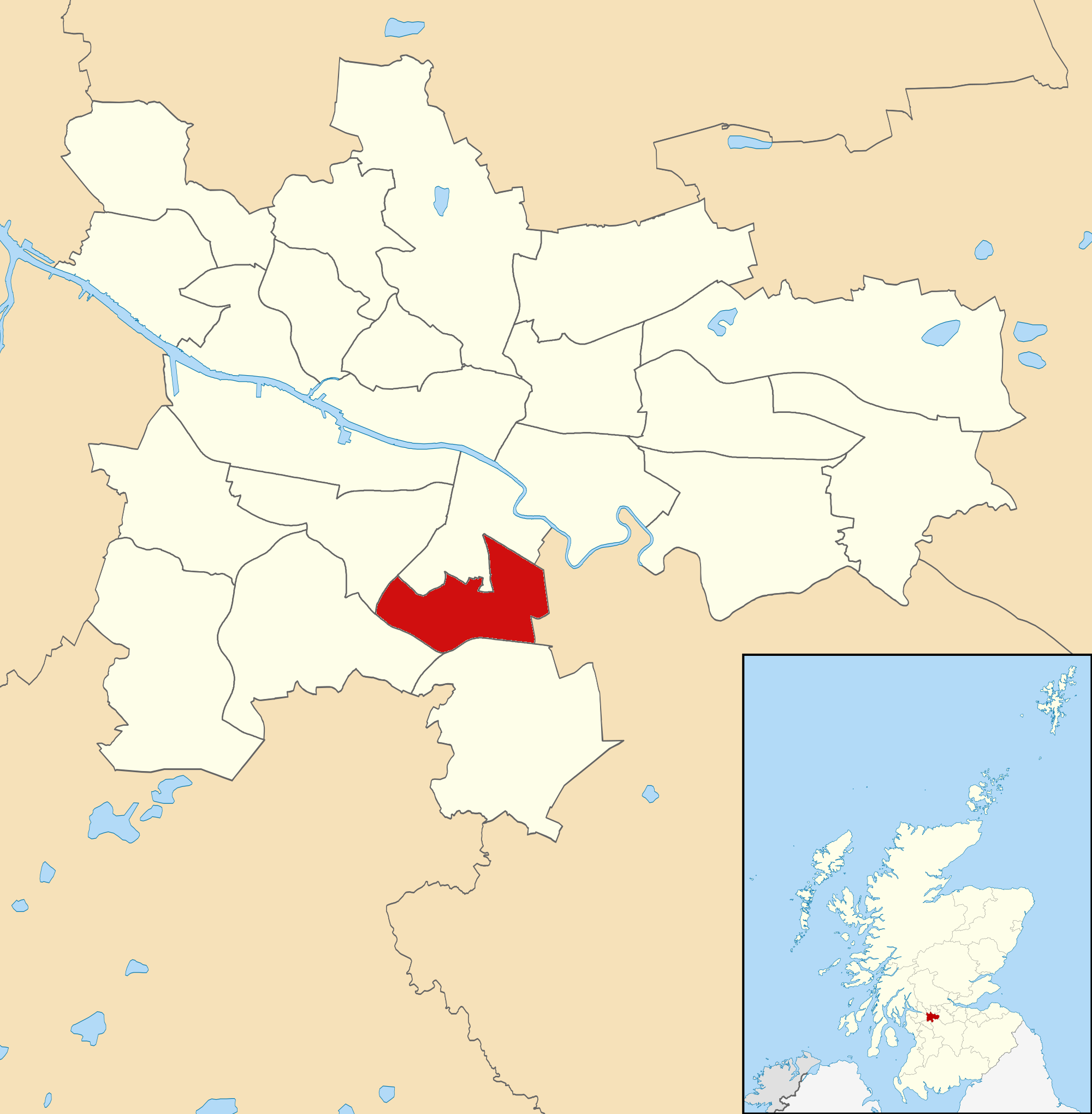
- Langside Ward (2017) within Glasgow

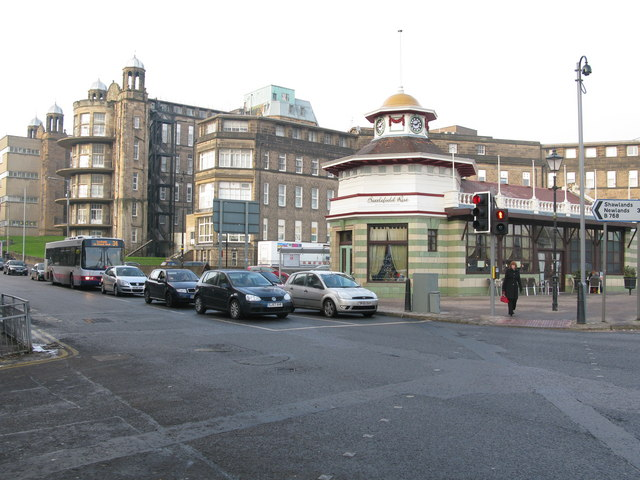
- Battlefield Rest in the Langside ward
- Area: 1.8 sq mi (4.7 km^{2})
- Population: 29,060 (2017)
  - Density: 16,144.4/sq mi (6,233.4/km^{2})
- Council area: Glasgow City Council
- Lieutenancy area: Glasgow
- Country: Scotland
- Sovereign state: United Kingdom
- Post town: GLASGOW
- Postcode district: G41, G42, G43, G44
- Dialling code: 0141
- Police: Scotland
- Fire: Scottish
- Ambulance: Scottish

Langside (Ward 7) is one of the 23 wards of Glasgow City Council. On its creation in 2007 and in 2012 it returned three council members, using the single transferable vote system. For the 2017 Glasgow City Council election, the boundaries were changed, the ward increased in size and returned four members.

== Boundaries ==
The ward is situated on the south side of Glasgow. As well as Langside itself, it also includes Battlefield, Mount Florida (including Hampden Park and the New Victoria Hospital), the northern parts of King's Park and Cathcart and the eastern part of Shawlands. The 2017 expansion took in Toryglen from the Southside Central ward and a few streets on the north side of the Cathcart Circle Line railway which had previously been in Newlands/Auldburn when the boundary was the White Cart Water.

The ethnic makeup of the expanded Langside ward using the 2011 census population statistics was:

- 89.4% White Scottish / British / Irish / Other
- 6.5% Asian (Mainly Pakistani)
- 1.3% Black (Mainly African)
- 0.9% Mixed / Other Ethnic Group

== Councillors ==
Election	Councillors			
2007	Archie Graham (Labour)	James Dornan (SNP)	Paul Coleshill (Liberal Democrats)	3 seats
2012	Archie Graham (Labour)	Susan Aitken (SNP)	Liam Hainey (Green)	3 seats
2015 by	Archie Graham (Labour)	Susan Aitken (SNP)	Anna Richardson (SNP)	3 seats
2017	Archie Graham (Labour)	Susan Aitken (SNP)	Anna Richardson (SNP)	Tanya Wisely (Green)
2022	Stephen Ignatius Docherty (Labour)	Susan Aitken (SNP)	Paul Leinster (SNP)	Holly Bruce (Green)

== Election results ==
=== 2022 election ===
2022 Glasgow City Council election

Langside – 4 seats
Party	Candidate	FPv%	Count								
Party	Candidate	FPv%	1	2	3	4	5	6	7	8	9
Green	Holly Bruce	27.9	3,173								
SNP	Susan Aitken (incumbent)	25.5	2,899								
Labour	Stephen Ignatius Docherty	16.5	1,870	1,978	2,022	2,030	2,058	2,113	2,346		
Labour	Aileen Mary McKenzie (Note: Sitting councillor for Springburn/Robroyston.)	10.2	1,163	1,281	1,297	1,310	1,359	1,457	1,769	1,828	
Conservative	Bruce Whyte	8.6	975	979	982	988	996	1,036			
SNP	Paul Leinster	6.8	775	1,212	1,719	1,767	1,847	1,872	1,884	1,887	2,240
Liberal Democrats	Michael Edward Shields	2.0	225	272	278	286	303				
TUSC	Ronnie Stevenson	1.3	153	224	229	261					
Alba	Chigozie Anne Osuchukwu	1.1	125	136	145						
Electorate: 24,680 Valid: 11,358 Spoilt: 239 Quota: 2,272 Turnout: 47.0%

=== 2017 election ===
2017 Glasgow City Council election

Langside – 4 seats
Party	Candidate	FPv%	Count								
Party	Candidate	FPv%	1	2	3	4	5	6	7	8	9
SNP	Susan Aitken (incumbent)	26.84%	2,874								
SNP	Anna Richardson (incumbent)	16.37%	1,760	2,310							
Labour	Archie Graham (incumbent)	19.43%	2,089	2,140	2,153						
Green	Tanya Wisely	11.88%	1,277	1,340	1,437	1,438	1,496	1,506	1,622	1,863	2,223
Conservative	Thomas Haddow	13.57%	1,459	1,465	1,467	1,467	1,468	1,511	1,593	1,766	
Labour	Steven Livingston	6.86%	737	745	752	755	772	788	878		
Liberal Democrats	Kevin Lewsey	3.26%	350	355	360	360	364	374			
UKIP	Jane Collins	0.99%	106	110	111	111	114				
TUSC	Ronnie Stevenson	0.90%	97	98	103	103					
Electorate: 24,301 Valid: 10,749 Spoilt: 279 Quota: 2,150 Turnout: 45.4%

=== 2012 election ===
2012 Glasgow City Council election

Langside – 3 seats
Party	Candidate	FPv%	Count							
Party	Candidate	FPv%	1	2	3	4	5	6	7	8
Labour	Archie Graham (incumbent)	35.80%	2,320							
SNP	Susan Aitken	28.12%	1,822							
Green	Liam Hainey	8.50%	551	690	705	745	834	895	1,180	1,560
SNP	Alex Hewetson	9.49%	615	692	852	859	892	929	1,059	
Liberal Democrats	Paul Coleshill (incumbent)	7.25%	470	567	575	592	606	808		
Conservative	Russell Munn	7.38%	478	512	515	517	524			
TUSC	Ronnie Stevenson	2.42%	157	213	216	238				
Glasgow First	Cayleigh Dornan	1.03%	67	116	120					
Electorate: 18,902 Valid: 6,480 Spoilt: 88 Quota: 1,621 Turnout: 34.75%

==== Recount ====
It was announced by Glasgow City Council on Thursday 10 May 2012 that Box 139, containing approximately 385 papers, was not counted in the vote despite them being registered and scanned. Permission was obtained from Glasgow Sheriff Court to examine the ballots and rerun the calculation. The two highest scoring candidates were mathematically assured of their place, however the third candidate, Liam Hainey, could have had his election overturned. After the ballots were rescanned on 16 May 2012 and the result recalculated, he retained his seat.

==== 2015 by-election ====
On 14 May 2015, Green counsellor Liam Hainey resigned his seat for family and health reasons. A by-election was held on 6 August 2015 and was won by the SNP's Anna Richardson.

Langside by-election (6 August 2015) - 1 Seat
Party	Candidate	FPv%	Count	
Party	Candidate	FPv%	1	2
SNP	Anna Richardson	49.9%	2134	2,143
Labour	Eileen Dinning	21.8%	932	945
Green	Robert Pollock	13.5%	579	598
Conservative	Kyle Thornton	8.9%	379	379
Liberal Democrats	Will Millinship	2.9%	125	125
UKIP	Cailean Mongan	1.5%	65	66
TUSC	Ian Leech	1.4%	62	
Electorate: 20,938 Valid: 4,276 Spoilt: 27 Quota: 2,139 Turnout: 4,303 (21.7%)

=== 2007 election ===
2007 Glasgow City Council election

2007 Council election: Langside
Party	Candidate	FPv%	Count						
Party	Candidate	FPv%	1	2	3	4	5	6	7
SNP	James Dornan	27.02	2,522						
Labour	Archie Graham (Note: Outgoing councillor for Langside single-member ward.)	23.81	2,222	2,241	2,255	2,330	2,917		
Liberal Democrats	Paul Coleshill	12.93	1,207	1,243	1,264	1,338	1,405	1,547	1,961
Green	Neil Sloan McDonald	9.55	891	924	974	1,154	1,214	1,310	1,463
Conservative	Russell Munn	10.64	993	1,003	1,008	1,024	1,052	1,088	
Labour	Margaret McCafferty (Note: Outgoing councillor for Battlefield single-member ward.)	9.14	853	859	868	902			
Solidarity	Martin Frain	5.00	467	492	541				
Scottish Socialist	James Nesbitt	1.92	179	187					
Electorate: 18,296 Valid: 9,334 Spoilt: 149 Quota: 2,334 Turnout: 51.84%

== See also ==
- Wards of Glasgow
