= Craigton, Glasgow =

Coordinates: 55.8498°N 4.3289°W

Craigton: Scottish Gaelic: Baile Chreig; Scots: Craigtoun
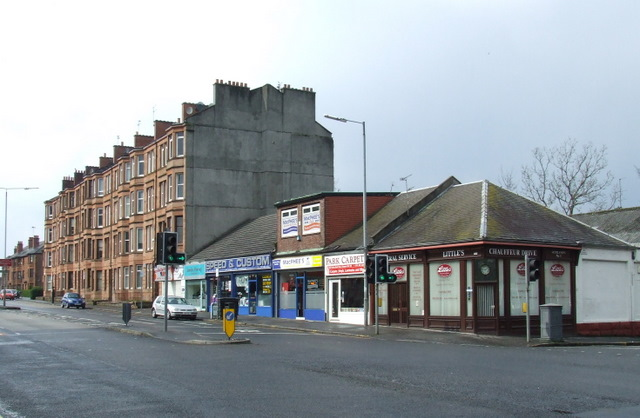
- Shops and tenements in Craigton on Paisley Road West

- Location within Glasgow
- OS grid reference: NS543643
- Council area: Glasgow City Council
- Lieutenancy area: Glasgow
- Country: Scotland
- Sovereign state: United Kingdom
- Post town: GLASGOW
- Postcode district: G52
- Dialling code: 0141
- Police: Scotland
- Fire: Scottish
- Ambulance: Scottish
- UK Parliament: Glasgow South West
- Scottish Parliament: Glasgow Pollok

Craigton (Scottish Gaelic: Baile Chreig) is a residential suburb in the southwest of the city of Glasgow, Scotland. Located approximately three miles (five kilometres) from the city centre, it is bordered by Bellahouston Park to the south and Halfway to the west, with Cardonald beyond.

The area was historically farming land for Govan, which is nearby to the north across the M8 motorway and Inverclyde Line railway tracks. A pedestrian underpass, previously a road on which city trams and buses operated, leads north from Craigton under the motorway onto Craigton Road, which is within the Drumoyne neighbourhood. Historically the Craigton Road area was occupied by Craigton Farm, while the estate of Craigton House was acquired to build the Craigton neighbourhood (developed for housing between the World Wars, as were Drumoyne and other nearby developments like the contrasting Moorepark and Mosspark projects).

The area has an eponymous primary school opened in 1910 (once attended by artist George Wyllie), a small industrial estate and a number of shops lining Paisley Road West. Craigton Cemetery is immediately to the west of Craigton and was opened in 1873. The cemetery grounds contain a crematorium, which opened in 1957. To the east is Helen Street police station (a modern replacement for Govan's previous offices in Orkney Street) built on the site of the White City Stadium, used for greyhound racing and motorcycle speedway; Ibrox railway station was slightly further east, also within walking distance of Craigton until its closure in the late 1960s, about the same time as the stadium.

The triangular parcel of land between Paisley Road West and Mosspark Boulevard and west of Bellahouston Park has been occupied by housing since the 1920s. It was originally fields belonging to a farm called Wearieston so was occasionally known as such in the years following its construction, but the name has since fallen out of use.

Since 2017, Craigton has fallen within the Pollokshields ward under Glasgow City Council, having been in the Govan ward for the decade prior. There was also a ward named Craigton, but the neighbourhood of that name was never part of it, and in 2017 it was re-named to the more accurate title of Cardonald.
