= Britannica Party =

British political party

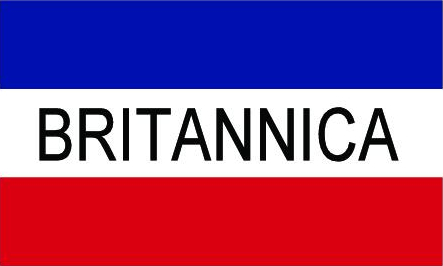
- Leader: Charles Baillie
- Founded: 18 August 2011
- Dissolved: 5 November 2020
- Split from: British National Party (Glasgow branch)
- Headquarters: 7 Craigton Cottages; Lower Craigton; Milngavie; G62 7HQ
- Ideology: British nationalism; National conservatism; Social conservatism; Right-wing populism; Euroscepticism; Anti-capitalism; Anti-communism; Antisemitism
- Political position: Far-right
- Colours: Red White Blue; Black (customary)

Website
- http://britannicaparty.blogspot.com/

Britannica, also known as the Britannica Party, was a far-right political party, led by Charles Baillie, the former organiser of the British National Party's Glasgow branch. It was first registered in August 2011.

The party was formed by Baillie when he, along with other leading members of the BNP in Scotland, was expelled for plotting against the then party leader, Nick Griffin. It is, in essence, the core of the BNP Glasgow branch, including Max Dunbar (treasurer and former treasurer of BNP Glasgow), Jean Douglas and Martin Clark. John Robertson, the BNP "security officer" for the Highlands & Islands, was also a member.

The party was mostly inactive from 2014, and was de-registered as a political party in November 2020.

== Electoral performance ==
The party stood four candidates at the 2012 Glasgow City Council election, receiving a total of 73 votes. It also stood at three council by-elections in Glasgow, in Hillhead (17 November 2011, 11 votes), Govan (10 October 2013, 19 votes) and Shettleston (5 December 2013, 31 votes).

It registered with the Electoral Commission as campaigning for a "No" vote in the 2014 Scottish independence referendum.

The party did not appear to have grown, but its accounts were regularly filed with the Electoral Commission, showing income for 2015 and 2016 respectively of 4p and 3p, with the only expenditure in both years being the annual £50 registration fee to the Commission.
