= Scottish Democratic Alliance =

- Founded: 2009
- Dissolved: October 2021
- Ideology: Scottish independence Hard Euroscepticism
- Political position: Centre-right

Website
- Dead - archived 15 August 2020

The Scottish Democratic Alliance (SDA) was a political organisation formed in 2009 as the successor to the Scottish Enterprise Party (SEP). It supports Scottish independence and withdrawal from the European Union. Although it evolved from a political party, the SDA spent some time operating as a think tank on current affairs in Scotland. It stood its first candidate for election in the 2013 Aberdeen Donside by-election, coming last with 35 votes (0.1%).

== Policies ==
The SDA favoured a low-tax Scotland independent of both the EU and the UK. It "supported the use of renewable sources of energy" but opposed high subsidisation of "unsustainable" energy sources and the trend of subsidised commercial wind farms. It also opposed the development of wind farms in "scenically sensitive areas".

The SDA proposed "necessary investment" in transport, as well as a price cap of £1 GBP per litre on petrol and diesel and the elimination of the "road licensing tax". The SDA also proposed a scheduled ferry service between Aberdeen and Norway to promote tourism.

== History ==
The Scottish Enterprise Party was a centre-right political party in Scotland which supported Scottish independence and withdrawal from the European Union. It was formed in July 2004 to provide an alternative to the largely social democratic Scottish National Party for centre-right voters who support independence.

The party opposed Scottish membership of the European Union and any prospective membership of the euro; it supported the principle of a constitutional monarchy and elections conducted through the Single Transferable Vote. The SEP backed the constitutional view that parliamentary sovereignty does not apply in Scotland, because sovereignty in Scotland resides with the people, as set out in the Declaration of Arbroath.

The party fielded three candidates in the 2007 Scottish Parliamentary elections, obtaining a total of 1,025 votes and winning no seats. The party was eventually superseded by the Scottish Democratic Alliance in 2009. The SDA was registered with the Electoral Commission in June 2009, and the SEP was simultaneously wound up.

Activists from the SDA carried a banner at the March and Rally for Scottish Independence in September 2013 which read: "a vote for independence is not a vote for the SNP".

The SDA fielded James Trolland in a series of elections in 2013 and 2014. Trolland contested the 2013 Aberdeen Donside by-election, campaigning on issues like the European Union, road accidents, potential police station closures, and school closures, and received 35 votes (0.15%). He stood in by-elections to Glasgow City Council on two occasions: once in Govan, where he won a single first preference vote; and again in Shettleston, where he won six votes. Trolland contested the 2014 Cowdenbeath by-election and won 51 votes (0.25%).

The party did not contest the 2015 general election.

During the 2016 United Kingdom European Union membership referendum the Scottish Democratic Alliance campaigned in favour of the UK leaving the European Union.
