= Scottish Unionist Party (1986) =

Scottish Unionist Party Pàrtaidh Aonachdach na h-Alba Scottis Unionist Pairty
- Leader: Jon Stanley
- Chairman: Jon Stanley
- Founded: 1986; February 2022 (re-established)
- Dissolved: 10 November 2021
- Split from: Conservative Party
- Headquarters: 15 Tanzieknowe Road; Cambuslang; Glasgow; G72 8RD
- Ideology: Scottish unionism British unionism Anti-devolution
- Colours: White and Royal blue
- Scottish Parliament: 0 / 129
- Local government in Scotland: 0 / 1,227

Website
- scottishunionistparty.co.uk

The Scottish Unionist Party (SUP) is a minor political party in Scotland. As a unionist party, it advocates keeping Scotland (along with England, Wales and Northern Ireland) in the United Kingdom. It is also anti-devolution, advocating the abolition of the Scottish Parliament.

== History ==
The SUP was formed in 1986 by a number of members of the Conservative Party disillusioned with Margaret Thatcher's Conservative government signing the Anglo-Irish Agreement. In the early years of its existence, the party found a great deal of support amongst members of the Scottish Orange Order.

Many traditional supporters of the Scottish Conservatives and others felt that the signing of the treaty giving the Republic of Ireland a role in the government of Northern Ireland was a betrayal of the Unionists in that part of the United Kingdom and the associated Protestant community.

== Electoral performance ==
The SUP contested elections including the Scottish Parliament elections in 1999, 2003, 2007 and 2011. In 2003, the SUP contested only the Glasgow, Central Scotland and West of Scotland Additional Members System electoral regions, yet failed to poll enough votes to elect any MSPs. It also contested only six local council wards in 2003, all located in the West Central Belt where the traditional "Orange vote" resides. In one Glasgow city centre seat (Kingston), they achieved third place.

The SUP also stood for two seats at the 2001 general election, in Glasgow Springburn and Airdrie and Shotts. The party managed to retain its deposit in the former and almost did so in the latter. This was not so surprising in Springburn, for there was no Conservative candidate since it was the constituency in which the Speaker, Michael Martin, was seeking re-election, but in Airdrie and Shotts, despite the presence of a Conservative and Unionist candidate, the SUP still managed to poll 4.5% of the vote. At the 2005 general election the party fielded its leader, Daniel Houston, in Glasgow North East against Speaker Martin again; Houston won 4.5% of the vote, almost enough to retain his deposit.

The party failed to win any seats at the 2007 Scottish Parliament elections or the Scottish local elections held at the same time. According to the 2007 statement of accounts with the Electoral Commission the party has 128 members, which was up by 10 on the previous year though income from memberships fell from GBP 572 to GBP 365. It was deregistered by the Electoral Commission on 6 November 2009.

However, the party appeared to have revived in 2012, when it ran a slate of candidates in the Glasgow Council elections, receiving 586 votes. It also fielded two candidates in the South Lanarkshire Council elections where their candidates received an average of 3.2% of the vote in the two wards it stood in.

The SUP did not field any candidates for the 2021 Scottish Parliament election, with Johnathan Stanley, the party chairman, standing unsuccessfully for the pro-union All for Unity party on the Central Scotland list. Stanley would later run as the SUP candidate in the 2021 Airdrie and Shotts by-election, coming sixth out of eight candidates, with 59 votes (0.3%).

It was deregistered in November 2021, and re-registered in February 2022.

== Campaigns ==
The SUP campaigns against what it sees as anti-Protestant and anti-Unionist government policies. The party is often strongly critical of mainstream parties that they view as failing to safeguard the Act of Union 1707, including the major pro-Union parties in Scotland. A number of its major policies are to:

- Oppose any moves to amend the Act of Settlement 1701, which disallows the British monarch from marrying or being a practising Roman Catholic.
- Abolish the devolved Scottish Parliament.
- End the present system of state funded Roman Catholic schools and work towards the creation of "multi-denominational" schools to cater to those of all faiths and none, in the belief that it will lead to greater social cohesion and an end to sectarianism.
- Increase pensions and support for senior citizens.
- Institute "zero tolerance" approaches to street crime, youth offences and drugs offences.
- Significantly reduce immigration and have tighter border controls.

== See also ==
- British Unionist Party
- Unionist Party (Scotland)
- Unionism in Scotland
