= Glasgow First =

- Founded: March 2012
- Split from: Scottish Labour Party
- Political position: Centre-left
- Glasgow City Council: 0 / 79

Glasgow First was a political party based in Glasgow, Scotland. It was formed in March 2012 after a series of Labour members of Glasgow City Council, said to be a fifth of their number, either resigned or lost the whip. The immediate cause was the deselection of a significant number of incumbent Labour councillors ahead of the 2012 local elections, where the Labour party hoped to put forward new candidates. Among those deselected where Stephen Dornan, Tommy Morrison and Anne Marie Millar.

The timing of the resignations caused issues for the Labour run council, which was simultaneously attempting to pass the Glasgow City budget, which many of the resigning candidates voted against. The budget ultimately passed by 40–38, with Labour having to taxi sick councillors to the vote.

The new party stood twenty candidates in the 2012 Glasgow City Council election with one elected.

However, on 6 February 2015 Cllr Stephen Dornan joined the Scottish National Party leaving the party without representation on Glasgow City Council. Party leader Tommy Morrison later rejoined the Labour party in August 2015.

The party was deregistered by the Electoral Commission in November 2015.
