= Glasgow City Council elections =

Local government elections in Glasgow, Scotland

Glasgow City Council in Scotland holds elections every five years, previously holding them every four years from its creation as a single-tier authority in 1995 to 2007.

== Council elections ==
=== As a district council ===
Year	SNP	Labour	Conservative	Liberal (Note: Alliance from 1981 to 1988, Liberal Democrats from 1988 to 1995.)	Militant Labour	Independent
1974	0	55	17	0	0	0
1977	16	30	25	1	0	0
1980	0	58	11	3	0	0
1984 (Note: New ward boundaries.)	0	59	5	2	0	0
1988	0	60	4	2	0	0
1992	2	54	5	1	2	2 (Note: Independent Labour.)

=== As a unitary authority ===
Year	SNP	Labour	Green	Conservative	Liberal Democrats	Glasgow First	Solidarity	Scottish Socialist	Militant Labour
1995 (Note: Parts of old district council transferred to South Lanarkshire Council.)	1	77	0	3	1	0	0	0	1
1999 (Note: New ward boundaries.)	2	74	0	1	1	0	0	1	0
2003	4	71	0	1	3	0	0	1	0
2007 (Note: Change to single transferable vote system and new ward boundaries.)	22	45	5	1	5	0	1	0	0
2012	27	44	5	1	1	1	0	0	0
2017 (Note: New ward boundaries.)	39	31	7	8	0	0	0	0	0
2022	37	36	10	2	0	0	0	0	0

== Results maps ==
1984 results map

1988 results map

1992 results map

1995 results map

1999 results map

2003 results map

2007 results map

2012 results map

2017 results map

2022 results map

== By-elections ==
=== 2003-2007 ===
Drumry By-Election 4 September 2003
Party	Candidate	Votes	%	±%
Labour	Lawrence O'Neill	667	62.6	+7.6
Scottish Socialist		191	17.9	+2.0
SNP		143	13.4	−1.6
Conservative		31	2.9	+0.4
Liberal Democrats		15	1.4	−1.4
Green		12	1.1	+1.1
Socialist Labour		7	0.7	+0.7
Majority		476	44.7	
Turnout		1,066		
Labour hold		Swing		

Knightswood Park By-Election 10 November 2005
Party	Candidate	Votes	%	±%
Labour		973	54.2	−3.3
SNP		374	20.8	+3.6
Liberal Democrats		235	13.1	+8.0
Scottish Socialist		97	5.4	−5.2
Conservative		80	4.5	−5.1
Green		35	2.0	+2.0
Majority		599	33.4	
Turnout		1,794		
Labour hold		Swing		

Milton By-Election 16 February 2006
Party	Candidate	Votes	%	±%
SNP	Billy McAllister	773	49.6	+17.1
Labour		623	40.0	−12.6
Scottish Socialist		93	6.0	−4.6
Liberal Democrats		44	2.8	−1.4
Conservative		24	1.5	+1.5
Majority		150	9.6	
Turnout		1,557		
SNP gain from Labour		Swing		

King's Park By-Election 30 March 2006
Party	Candidate	Votes	%	±%
Liberal Democrats	Margaret Clark	572	31.7	+21.9
Labour	Stuart Donaldson	472	26.2	−17.0
SNP	Euan McCreath	431	23.9	+0.3
Conservative	David Meikle	222	12.3	−1.4
Scottish Socialist	Andrew Fullwood	44	2.4	+2.4
Green	Kay Allan	38	2.1	+2.1
Independent	James Rawlings	23	1.3	+1.3
Majority		100	5.5	
Turnout		1,802		
Liberal Democrats gain from Labour		Swing		

=== 2007-2012 ===
Baillieston By-Election 18 September 2008
Party	Candidate	FPv%	Count								
Party	Candidate	FPv%	1	2	3	4	5	6	7	8	9
SNP	David Turner	44.6	2,318	2,320	2,330	2,344	2,355	2,381	2,415	2,511	3,131
Labour	Andy Muir	41.7	2,167	2,168	2,171	2,186	2,189	2,208	2,264	2,313	
Conservative	John Anderson	5.0	259	272	273	274	304	310	340		
Liberal Democrats	David Jackson	3.1	159	162	171	176	176	180			
Solidarity	Tricia McLeish	1.4	74	76	80	96	105				
BNP	Charles Baillie	1.4	73	79	81	81					
Scottish Socialist	Daniel O'Donnell	1.1	58	58	61						
Green	Moira Crawford	0.9	45	46							
Scottish Unionist	Ian Dickie	0.8	43								
SNP hold											
Valid: 5,196 Spoilt: 65 Quota: 2,599 Turnout: 5,261

Baillieston By-Election 6 November 2008
Party	Candidate	FPv%	Count						
Party	Candidate	FPv%	1	2	3	4	5	6	7
Labour	Andy Muir	46.8	2,257	2,260	2,263	2,286	2,335	2,383	3,124
SNP	David Cassidy	42.1	2,027	2,037	2,046	2,074	2,116	2,193	
Conservative	John Anderson	4.7	226	231	245	249	269		
Liberal Democrats	David Jackson	2.9	142	146	146	154			
Scottish Socialist	Daniel O'Donnell	1.8	88	93	97				
BNP	Charles Baillie	1.0	46	46					
Green	Moira Crawford	0.7	32						
Labour hold									
Valid: 4,818 Spoilt: 58 Quota: 2,410 Turnout: 4,876

Drumchapel/Anniesland By-Election 4 June 2009
Party	Candidate	FPv%	Count				
Party	Candidate	FPv%	1	2	3	4	5
Labour	Anne McTaggart	48.4	2,584	2,593	2,613	2,651	2,689
SNP	Martin J Docherty	28.3	1,509	1,530	1,573	1,651	1,698
Liberal Democrats	Nathalie McKee	6.5	349	362	373	443	532
Conservative	Richard Alan Sullivan	5.9	316	327	359	366	
Green	Eileen Duke	5.1	270	284	295		
BNP	John Robertson	3.3	177	186			
Independent	James Trolland	2.4	129				
Labour gain from SNP							
Valid: 5,334 Spoilt: 84 Quota: 2,667 Turnout: 5,418

Drumchapel/Anniesland By-Election 6 May 2010
Party	Candidate	FPv%	Count
Party	Candidate	FPv%	1
Labour	Christopher Hughes	56.3	5,710
SNP	Frank Rankin	21.7	2,197
Liberal Democrats	Paul McGarry	11.3	1,143
Conservative	Richard Alan Sullivan	7.0	710
Green	Larry Butler	3.7	375
Labour hold			
Valid: 10,030 Spoilt: 239 Quota: 5,016 Turnout: 10,269

Hillhead By-Election 17 November 2011
Party	Candidate	FPv%	Count						
Party	Candidate	FPv%	1	2	3	4	5	6	7
SNP	Ken Andrew	32.8	1,026	1,027	1,030	1,079	1,174	1,386	1,851
Labour	Martin McElroy	30.2	945	946	950	992	1,057	1,276	
Green	Stuart Leckie	13.9	435	436	441	556	639		
Conservative	Maya Forrest	11.9	372	374	384	441			
Liberal Democrats	Ewan Hoyle	9.8	307	310	311				
UKIP	Neil Craig	1.1	36	37					
Britannica Party	Charles Baillie	0.4	11						
SNP hold									
Valid: 3,132 Spoilt: 40 Quota: 1,567 Turnout: 3,172

=== 2012-2017 ===
Govan By-Election 10 October 2013
Party	Candidate	FPv%	Count												
Party	Candidate	FPv%	1	2	3	4	5	6	7	8	9	10	11	12	13
Labour	John Kane	43.4	2,055	2,055	2,056	2,058	2,062	2,075	2,082	2,108	2,137	2,149	2,180	2,216	2,417
SNP	Helen Walker	30.1	1,424	1,425	1,426	1,431	1,435	1,449	1,456	1,466	1,485	1,497	1,541	1,575	1,678
No Bedroom Tax	John Flanagan	9.4	446	446	449	455	466	479	483	487	501	515	539	562	
Conservative	Richard Sullivan	4.5	215	215	216	216	216	218	229	237	243	269	293		
Green	Moira Crawford	2.4	112	112	113	116	125	129	131	142	150	158			
UKIP	Janice MacKay	2.4	113	113	116	116	116	116	119	120	126				
Independent	George Laird	2.2	103	102	102	104	104	105	113	117					
Liberal Democrats	Ewan Hoyle	1.5	73	73	74	75	76	76	84						
Scottish Christian	John Cormack	1.3	60	60	61	62	65	65							
Independent	Thomas Rannachan	1.1	52	52	52	52	53								
Communist	Ryan Boyle	0.7	35	35	35	37									
Solidarity	Joyce Drummond	0.6	28	28	29										
Britannica Party	Charles Baillie	0.4	19	19											
SDA	James Trolland	0.0	1												
Labour gain from SNP															
Valid: 4,736 Spoilt: 120 Quota: 2,369 Turnout: 4,856

Shettleston By-Election 5 December 2013
Party	Candidate	FPv%	Count
Party	Candidate	FPv%	1
Labour	Martin Neill	53.6	2,026
SNP	Laura Docherty	28.7	1,086
Conservative	Raymond McCrae	5.9	224
UKIP	Arthur Misty Thackeray	3.4	129
TUSC	Jamie Cocozza	1.8	68
Liberal Democrats	James Speirs	1.4	53
No Bedroom Tax	John Flanagan	1.3	50
Green	Alasdair Duke	1.1	41
Scottish Socialist	Tommy Ball	0.9	35
Christian	Victor Murphy	0.9	34
Britannica Party	Charlie Baillie	0.8	31
SDA	James Trolland	0.2	6
Labour hold			
Valid: 3,783 Spoilt: 65 Quota: 1,892 Turnout: 3,777

Anderston/City By-Election 6 August 2015
Party	Candidate	FPv%	Count					
Party	Candidate	FPv%	1	2	3	4	5	6
SNP	Eva Bolander	48.1	1,441	1,444	1,446	1,457	1,473	1,750
Labour	Katie Ford	28.6	857	857	866	881	943	1,024
Green	Christy Mearns	13.8	414	414	421	442	467	
Conservative	Ary Jaff	5.5	164	166	173	184		
Liberal Democrats	Gary McLelland	2.2	66	68	70			
UKIP	Janice MacKay	1.4	43	45				
Scottish Libertarian	Stevie Creighton	0.4	12					
SNP hold								
Valid: 2,997 Spoilt: 39 Quota: 1,499 Turnout: 3,036

Calton By-Election 6 August 2015
Party	Candidate	FPv%	Count
Party	Candidate	FPv%	1
SNP	Greg Hepburn	55.5	1,507
Labour	Thomas Rannachan	30.0	814
Conservative	Thomas Kerr	4.7	129
UKIP	Karen King	3.8	103
Green	Malachy Clarke	3.6	99
Independent	Tommy Ramsay	1.7	47
Liberal Democrats	Chris Young	0.7	18
SNP hold			
Valid: 2,717 Spoilt: 50 Quota: 1,359 Turnout: 2,767

Craigton by-election 6 August 2015
Party	Candidate	FPv%	Count
Party	Candidate	FPv%	1
SNP	Alex Wilson	54.2	2,674
Labour	Kevin O'Donnell	33.3	1,643
Conservative	Philip Charles	6.1	300
Green	Katie Noble	2.8	136
UKIP	Arthur Misty Thackeray	1.9	95
Liberal Democrats	Isabel Nelson	1.8	87
SNP hold			
Valid: 4,935 Spoilt: 71 Quota: 2,468 Turnout: 5,006

Langside By-Election 6 August 2015
Party	Candidate	FPv%	Count	
Party	Candidate	FPv%	1	2
SNP	Anna Richardson	49.9	2,134	2,143
Labour	Eileen Dinning	21.8	932	945
Green	Robert Pollock	13.5	579	598
Conservative	Kyle Thornton	8.9	379	379
Liberal Democrats	Will Millinship	2.9	125	125
UKIP	Cailean Mongan	1.5	65	66
TUSC	Ian Leech	1.4	62	
SNP gain from Green				
Valid: 4,276 Spoilt: 27 Quota: 2,139 Turnout: 4,303

Anderston/City By-Election 5 May 2016
Party	Candidate	FPv%	Count				
Party	Candidate	FPv%	1	2	3	4	5
SNP	Angus Millar	43.0	3,467	3,480	3,509	3,586	4,436
Labour	Steven Livingston	21.1	1,698	1,715	1,793	2,112	2,603
Green	Christy Mearns	20.1	1,621	1,637	1,710	1,869	
Conservative	Philip Charles	10.8	869	908	965		
Liberal Democrats	Ryan Ross	3.1	248	256			
UKIP	Karen King	1.9	154				
SNP gain from Labour							
Valid: 8,057 Spoilt: 133 Quota: 4,030 Turnout: 8,190

Garscadden/Scotstounhill By-Election 6 October 2016
Party	Candidate	FPv%	Count					
Party	Candidate	FPv%	1	2	3	4	5	6
SNP	Chris Cunningham	42.6	2,135	2,140	2,150	2,275	2,321	2,906
Labour	Ian Cruikshank	38.8	1,944	1,953	1,984	2,037	2,204	
Conservative	Ary Jaff	10.2	510	536	553	564		
Green	Gillian MacDonald	4.8	242	247	261			
Liberal Democrats	James Speirs	1.9	97	105				
UKIP	Donald MacKay	1.7	83					
SNP gain from Labour								
Valid: 5,011 Spoilt: 83 Quota: 2,506 Turnout: 5,094

=== 2017-2022 ===
Cardonald By-Election 7 September 2017
Party	Candidate	FPv%	Count				
Party	Candidate	FPv%	1	2	3	4	5
Labour	Jim Kavanagh	48.6	2,614	2,615	2,641	2,683	2,936
SNP	Alex Mitchell	36.7	1,972	1,972	1,981	2,066	2,101
Conservative	Thomas Haddow	10.3	552	554	566	574	
Green	John Smith	2.7	147	151	161		
Liberal Democrats	Isabel Nelson	1.5	80	82			
Scottish Libertarian	Antony Sammeroff	0.2	12				
Labour hold							
Valid: 5,377 Spoilt: 97 Quota: 2,689 Turnout: 5,474

Baillieston By-Election 18 March 2021
Party	Candidate	FPv%	Count					
Party	Candidate	FPv%	1	2	3	4	5	6
SNP	David Turner	43.8	1,980	1,980	1,990	2,092	2,133	2,678
Labour	William Docherty	28.3	1,278	1,282	1,310	1,365	1,868	
Conservative	John Daly	20.9	946	953	965	979		
Green	Lorraine McLaren	4.4	200	205	217			
Liberal Democrats	Daniel Donaldson	2.0	90	92				
UKIP	Christopher Ho	0.6	26					
SNP gain from Labour								
Valid: 4,520 Spoilt: 50 Quota: 2,261 Turnout: 4,570

Partick East/Kelvindale By-Election 18 March 2021
Party	Candidate	FPv%	Count					
Party	Candidate	FPv%	1	2	3	4	5	6
Labour	Jill Brown	28.3	1,836	1,842	1,932	2,498	2,927	4,186
SNP	Abdul Bostani	32.1	2,084	2,084	2,103	2,142	2,812	
Green	Blair Anderson	18.5	1,200	1,205	1,264	1,379		
Conservative	Naveed Ashgar	16.7	1,084	1,092	1,148			
Liberal Democrats	Tahir Jameel	4.0	259	260				
UKIP	Donald Mackay	0.5	33					
Labour gain from Conservative								
Valid: 6,496 Spoilt: 51 Quota: 3,249 Turnout: 6,547

=== 2022-2027 ===
Linn By-Election 17 November 2022
Party	Candidate	FPv%	Count							
Party	Candidate	FPv%	1	2	3	4	5	6	7	8
Labour	John Carson	43.4	2,227	2,227	2,227	2,239	2,256	2,381	2,524	2,674
SNP	Chris Lang-Tait	33.2	1,702	1,703	1,703	1,716	1,750	1,777	1,789	2,046
Green	Jen Bell	8.0	409	409	410	419	433	482	503	
Conservative	Pauline Sutherland	6.4	327	329	332	332	335	374		
Liberal Democrats	Joe McCauley	5.7	294	299	299	301	304			
Alba	Kirsty Fraser	1.8	90	90	91	97				
Scottish Socialist	George Willis MacDougall	0.9	46	49	52					
UKIP	Christopher Ho	0.4	19	20						
Freedom Alliance (UK)	Diane McMillan	0.4	18							
Labour hold										
Valid: 5,132 Spoilt: 73 Quota: 2,567 Turnout: 5,205

Hillhead By-Election 7 March 2024
Party	Candidate	FPv%	Count						
Party	Candidate	FPv%	1	2	3	4	5	6	7
Green	Seonad Hoy	31.5	1,284	1,284	1,298	1,353	1,372	1,908	2,605
Labour	Ruth Hall	31.8	1,298	1,299	1,340	1,367	1,472	1,721	
SNP	Malcolm McConnell	24.9	1,015	1,017	1,025	1,062	1,076		
Conservative	Faten Hameed	5.3	217	221	233	240			
Independent Green Voice	Alistair McConnachie	3.2	133	135	146				
Liberal Democrats	Daniel O'Malley	2.6	106	110					
Independent	Ryan McGinley	0.5	22						
Green gain from Labour									
Valid: 4,075 Spoilt: 63 Quota: 2,038 Turnout: 4,138

Drumchapel/Anniesland By-Election 21 November 2024
Party	Candidate	FPv%	Count						
Party	Candidate	FPv%	1	2	3	4	5	6	7
Labour	Davena Rankin	34.3	1,084	1,108	1,143	1,193	1,263	1,385	1,857
SNP	Adekemi Giwa	26.3	830	841	847	971	1,083	1,134	
Reform	Allan Douglas Lyons	12.8	405	412	461	473	524		
Independent	Elsbeth Kerr	9.4	297	310	331	372			
Green	Christopher Lavelle	8.3	263	270	275				
Conservative	Steven Morrison	5.8	184	196					
Liberal Democrats	Michael Edward Shields	2.9	93						
Labour hold									
Valid: 3,156 Spoilt: 42 Quota: 1,579 Turnout: 3,198

Maryhill By-Election 21 November 2024
Party	Candidate	FPv%	Count						
Party	Candidate	FPv%	1	2	3	4	5	6	7
Labour	Marie Garrity	35.9	999	1,013	1,043	1,057	1,163	1,258	1,731
SNP	Lorna Margaret Finn	29.2	814	817	820	868	1,052	1,093	
Reform	David Jamie McGowan	12.7	353	360	384	398	410		
Green	Ellie Gomersall	12.1	338	352	357	372			
Alba	Nick Durie	4.2	118	121	127				
Conservative	Susan McCourt	3.2	89	100					
Liberal Democrats	Daniel John O'Malley	2.7	75						
Labour hold									
Valid: 2,786 Spoilt: 40 Quota: 1,394 Turnout: 2,826

North East By-Election 21 November 2024
Party	Candidate	FPv%	Count						
Party	Candidate	FPv%	1	2	3	4	5	6	7
Labour	Mary McNab	34.3	630	642	655	671	708	808	1,069
SNP	Kilian Riley	32.2	591	596	605	632	638	686	
Reform	Robert McGregor	18.2	336	337	349	366	397		
Conservative	Thomas Haddow	5.3	99	104	107	111			
Green	Hayley McDonald	4.2	77	79	94				
TUSC	Anne McAllister	3.7	68	72					
Liberal Democrats	Peter McLaughlin	1.9	36						
Labour hold									
Valid: 1,837 Spoilt: 31 Quota: 919 Turnout: 1,868

Partick East/Kelvindale By-Election 5 December 2024
Party	Candidate	FPv%	Count			
Party	Candidate	FPv%	1	2	3	4
Labour	James Adams	37.5	1,723	1,854	2,143	2,485
SNP	Cylina Porch	23.1	1,062	1,089	1,112	1,532
Green	Heloise Le Moal	18.2	837	870	927	
Conservative	Faten Hameed	13.7	632	707		
Liberal Democrats	Nicholas Budgen	7.4	339			
Labour gain from SNP						
Valid: 4,593 Spoilt: 36 Quota: 2,297 Turnout: 4,629

North East By-Election 20 March 2025
Party	Candidate	FPv%	Count							
Party	Candidate	FPv%	1	2	3	4	5	6	7	8
SNP	Donna McGill	34.5	689	690	692	700	711	754	815	1,060
Labour	Debbie Duffy	28.7	573	576	581	591	612	623	728	
Reform	Rob Maddison	23.6	472	482	484	489	506	516		
Green	Hayley McDonald	3.5	70	70	82	90	97			
Conservative	Kyle Cannon	4.1	81	85	87	88				
TUSC	Anne McAllister	2.6	52	53	55					
Liberal Democrats	Peter McLaughlin	1.9	37	37						
UKIP	Christopher Ho	1.2	24							
SNP gain from Labour										
Valid: 1,998 Spoilt: 31 Quota: 1,000 Turnout: 2,029

Southside Central By-Election 20 March 2025
Party	Candidate	FPv%	Count							
Party	Candidate	FPv%	1	2	3	4	5	6	7	8
SNP	Mhairi Hunter	30.0	1,126	1,129	1,132	1,159	1,187	1,243	1,775	2,305
Labour	Samina Rashid	27.4	1,027	1,034	1,045	1,079	1,107	1,150	1,366	
Green	Laura Vroomen	21.5	805	805	814	837	856	994		
Scottish Socialist	Olivia Murphy	7.2	271	272	274	301	323			
Reform	Danny Raja	5.9	222	241	267	277				
Liberal Democrats	Nicholas Budgen	4.1	155	157	172					
Conservative	Kyle Park	2.7	102	105						
UKIP	Travis Power	1.1	41							
SNP gain from Labour										
Valid: 3,749 Spoilt: 66 Quota: 1,875 Turnout: 3,815
