= 1977 City of Glasgow District Council election =

1977 Scottish local government election

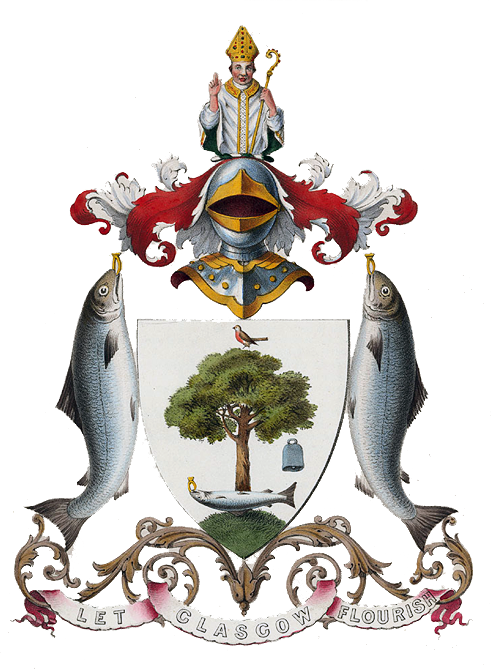
← 1974	3 May 1977	1980 →

All 72 seats to City of Glasgow District Council 37 seats needed for a majority
	First party	Second party
Leader	Dick Dynes
Party	Labour	Conservative
Last election	55 seats, 47.7%	17 seats, 28.8%
Seats won	30	25
Seat change	▼25	▲8
Popular vote	100,649	82,113
Percentage	35.1%	28.7%
Swing	▼12.6%	▼0.1%
	Third party	Fourth party
Leader	Frank Hannigan
Party	SNP	Liberal
Last election	0 seats, 19.2%	0 seats, 2.2%
Seats won	16	1
Seat change	▲16	▲1
Popular vote	93,695	5,439
Percentage	32.7%	1.9%
Swing	▲13.5%	▼0.3%
Council Leader before election
Labour
Elected Council Leader
No overall control

Elections for the City of Glasgow District Council took place on 3 May 1977, alongside elections to the councils of Scotland's various other districts. These were the second elections to the City of Glasgow District Council, and saw Labour losing their control of the council, losing nearly half of their councillors. Among the losing councillors was Dick Dynes, the Labour group leader. Dynes was replaced as leader by Jean McFadden.

== Results ==
1977 City of Glasgow District Council election results
Party	Seats	Gains	Losses	Net gain/loss	Seats %	Votes %	Votes	+/−
Labour	30			▼25	41.7	35.1	100,649	▼12.6
Conservative	25			▲8	34.7	28.7	82,113	▼0.1
SNP	16			▲16	22.2	32.7	93,695	▲13.5
Liberal	1			▲1	1.4	1.9	5,439	▼0.3
Communist	0			Steady	0.0	1.6	4,206	▲0.4
SLP	0			Steady	0.0	0.3	834	New
Residents	0			Steady	0.0	0.1	298	▼0.2
Ind. Conservative	0			Steady	0.0	0.1	173	New
Scottish Socialist	0			Steady	0.0	0.0	32	New

== Ward results ==
Ward 1: Tollcross
Party	Candidate	Votes	%
Labour	Helen McGregor (Incumbent)	1,764	
Conservative	W. Queen	1,607	
SNP	Margaret Brown	1,291	
Liberal	E. M. Bennett	132	
Communist	J. Smith	55	
Majority		157	
Turnout			

Ward 2: Parkhead
Party	Candidate	Votes	%
Labour	Susan Baird (Incumbent)	1,482	
SNP	M. Graham	1,093	
Conservative	Annette Bennett	970	
Communist	W. Kennedy	71	
Majority		389	
Turnout			

Ward 3: Carntyne
Party	Candidate	Votes	%
Labour	H. Macrae (Incumbent)	1,993	
SNP	I. Cameron	1,277	
Conservative	G. Dixon	919	
Majority		716	
Turnout			

Ward 4: Camlachie
Party	Candidate	Votes	%
Labour	A. McTaggart (Incumbent)	658	
SNP	A. Livingstone	519	
Conservative	J. McGlinchey	375	
Reidvale, Bluevale, Whitevale, Barrowfield Residents	J. Scroggie	289	
Majority		139	
Turnout			

Ward 5: Easterhouse
Party	Candidate	Votes	%
SNP	Patricia Kennedy	1,879	
Labour	A. Viola	1,779	
Conservative	R. Smith	397	
Communist	G. Cleland	134	
Majority		100	
Turnout			
SNP gain from Labour			

Ward 6: Garthamlock
Party	Candidate	Votes	%
SNP	E. Hendry	1,780	
Labour	Sarah Hattan	1,591	
Conservative	B. B. S. Clarke	698	
Communist	J. Jackson	209	
Majority		189	
Turnout			
SNP gain from Labour			

Ward 7: Wellhouse
Party	Candidate	Votes	%
Labour	N. Stobo (Incumbent)	1,801	
SNP	Theresa Murray	1,183	
Communist	D. McGregor	127	
Conservative	Joyce Clarke	37	
Majority		618	
Turnout			

Ward 8: Queenslie
Party	Candidate	Votes	%
SNP	Mary McGhee	1,667	
Labour	W. Fay (Incumbent)	1,568	
Conservative	T. Steven	479	
Communist	H. Holland	53	
Majority		99	
Turnout			
SNP gain from Labour			

Ward 9: Riddrie
Party	Candidate	Votes	%
Conservative	C. Gilbert	1,560	
SNP	Jean Hart	1,552	
Labour	W. Galloway (Incumbent)	1,455	
Communist	D. Ford	79	
Majority		8	
Turnout			
Conservative gain from Labour			

Ward 10: Lethamhill
Party	Candidate	Votes	%
Labour	D. Mason (Incumbent)	1,290	
SNP	B. Masterton	917	
Conservative	R. Watson	260	
Communist	S. Jackson	52	
Majority		373	
Turnout			

Ward 11: City
Party	Candidate	Votes	%
Labour	T. Ennis (Incumbent)	1,385	
SNP	J. Nugent	769	
Majority		616	
Turnout			

Ward 12: Townhead
Party	Candidate	Votes	%
Labour	P. O'Rourke (Incumbent)	1,192	
SNP	J. Byrne	452	
Conservative	A. Alexander	226	
Majority		740	
Turnout			

Ward 13: Calton
Party	Candidate	Votes	%
Labour	J. McQueenie (Incumbent)	969	
SNP	T. G. McLaughlin	604	
Majority		365	
Turnout			

Ward 14: Dalmarnock
Party	Candidate	Votes	%
Labour	J. Mullen (Incumbent)	1,163	
SNP	K. Taylor	874	
Majority		289	
Turnout			

Ward 15: Balornock
Party	Candidate	Votes	%
Labour	M. J. Martin (Incumbent)	2,195	
SNP	J. Brown	1,443	
Conservative	Moyra M. Wilson	647	
Majority		752	
Turnout			

Ward 16: Robroyston
Party	Candidate	Votes	%
Labour	J. Chatham (Incumbent)	1,805	
SNP	W. Lindsay	1,623	
Conservative	G. B. Wilson	343	
Majority		182	
Turnout			

Ward 17: Cowlairs
Party	Candidate	Votes	%
Labour	C. Moore (Incumbent)	533	
SNP	D. Shaw	470	
Majority		63	
Turnout			

Ward 18: Petershill
Party	Candidate	Votes	%
Labour	J. Henderson (Incumbent)	1,437	
SNP	Janice Kerr	1,077	
Majority		360	
Turnout			

Ward 19: Milnbank
Party	Candidate	Votes	%
Labour	W. L. Wightman (Incumbent)	1,426	
SNP	I. McIntosh	952	
Conservative	R. Bain	589	
Communist	I. Donnelly	66	
Majority		474	
Turnout			

Ward 20: Dennistoun
Party	Candidate	Votes	%
Conservative	R. McKay	1,898	
Labour	Elizabeth Crowson (Incumbent)	1,581	
SNP	J. F. McLaughlin	1,422	
Majority		313	
Turnout			
Conservative gain from Labour			

Ward 21: Summerston
Party	Candidate	Votes	%
SNP	S. M. Ewing	1,696	
Labour	R. Dynes (Incumbent)	1,637	
Conservative	B. Hayes	834	
Liberal	Diana Roberts	106	
Communist	Linda Clunie	85	
Majority		59	
Turnout			
SNP gain from Labour			

Ward 22: Wyndford
Party	Candidate	Votes	%
Labour	R. Gray (Incumbent)	1,374	
SNP	D. G. Brown	1,324	
Conservative	M. White	554	
Communist	P. B. Smith	59	
Majority		50	
Turnout			

Ward 23: Ruchill
Party	Candidate	Votes	%
Labour	D. Hodge (Incumbent)	1,474	
SNP	A. Crawford	1,363	
Conservative	E. Ledgerwood	563	
Communist	M. Meers	52	
Majority		111	
Turnout			

Ward 24: Milton
Party	Candidate	Votes	%
Labour	J. Kernaghan (Incumbent)	1,708	
SNP	A. Sheer	1,630	
Communist	C. A. Macnicol	107	
Majority		78	
Turnout			

Ward 25: Possilpark
Party	Candidate	Votes	%
Labour	R. Innes (Incumbent)	2,101	
SNP	D. Mackay	1,455	
Communist	D. Walsh	62	
Majority		646	
Turnout			

Ward 26: Cowcaddens
Party	Candidate	Votes	%
Labour	Jean A. McFadden (Incumbent)	2,276	
SNP	P. Hughes	1,088	
Communist	Fiona Harrison	83	
Majority		1,188	
Turnout			

Ward 27: Botanic Gardens
Party	Candidate	Votes	%
Conservative	Mary Goldie (Incumbent)	999	
SNP	M. MacRury	477	
Labour	D. Crawford	467	
Liberal	M. Owens	163	
Majority		522	
Turnout			

Ward 28: Park
Party	Candidate	Votes	%
Conservative	A. T. Keter (Incumbent)	1,295	
Labour	T. Lenehan	828	
SNP	D. McBride	778	
Majority		467	
Turnout			

Ward 29: Kelvin
Party	Candidate	Votes	%
Conservative	G. Rennie	680	
Labour	J. F. Ross (Incumbent)	611	
SNP	C. Petrie	461	
Ind. Conservative	W. M. Hutcheson	173	
Scottish Socialist	M. K. Montgomery	32	
Majority		69	
Turnout			
Conservative gain from Labour			

Ward 30: Woodside
Party	Candidate	Votes	%
Conservative	Catherine Morris (Incumbent)	946	
Labour	C. Williams	828	
SNP	Margaret Spencer	418	
Majority		281	
Turnout			

Ward 31: Partick East
Party	Candidate	Votes	%
Conservative	D. Wood (Incumbent)	1,472	
SNP	C. Mackellar	1,084	
Labour	P. J. Gahagan	960	
Communist	W. S. McFall	104	
Majority		388	
Turnout			

Ward 32: Anderston
Party	Candidate	Votes	%
Labour	R. McTaggart	1,232	
Conservative	A. Smith	931	
SNP	D. Duff	888	
Communist	R. Gilchrist	63	
Majority		301	
Turnout			

Ward 33: Anniesland
Party	Candidate	Votes	%
Conservative	W. Aitken (Incumbent)	2,931	
SNP	T. M. MacLeod	1,135	
Labour	Jean Smith	394	
Liberal	L. J. Clarke	352	
Majority		1,796	
Turnout			

Ward 34: Kelvinside
Party	Candidate	Votes	%
Conservative	R. N. S. Logan (Incumbent)	3,071	
SNP	J. Crawford	742	
Labour	D. Crozier	454	
Liberal	Elspeth Attwooll	375	
Majority		2,329	
Turnout			

Ward 35: Scotstoun
Party	Candidate	Votes	%
Conservative	S. Taylor	2,431	
Labour	W. Hattan (Incumbent)	2,358	
SNP	G. Borthwick	1,715	
Majority		73	
Turnout			
Conservative gain from Labour			

Ward 36: Partick West
Party	Candidate	Votes	%
Conservative	A. Hodgins (Incumbent)	2,664	
SNP	C. Cassidy	1,609	
Labour	K. Murray	1,123	
Majority		1,055	
Turnout			

Ward 37: Drumry
Party	Candidate	Votes	%
SNP	Marion Crawford	1,949	
Labour	Marion Catto (Incumbent)	1,561	
Communist	T. Matthews	92	
Majority		388	
Turnout			
SNP gain from Labour			

Ward 38: Summerhill
Party	Candidate	Votes	%
SNP	J. O'Brien	1,955	
Labour	J. Gunn (Incumbent)	1,235	
Communist	J. C. McCarry	262	
Majority		720	
Turnout			
SNP gain from Labour			

Ward 39: Blairdardie
Party	Candidate	Votes	%
SNP	J. C. Whyte	1,550	
Conservative	I. Lawson	1,448	
Labour	J. N. Canning (Incumbent)	1,209	
Communist	O. Bain	85	
Majority		102	
Turnout			
SNP gain from Labour			

Ward 40: Knightscliffe
Party	Candidate	Votes	%
SNP	C. Darroch	1,776	
Labour	Constance Methven (Incumbent)	1,525	
Conservative	Marjory Montgomerie	1,013	
Communist	A. Lindsay	62	
Majority		241	
Turnout			
SNP gain from Labour			

Ward 41: Yoker
Party	Candidate	Votes	%
SNP	D. McLean	2,077	
Labour	J. McLean (Incumbent)	1,764	
Conservative	B. D. Cooklin	830	
Communist	J. Moffat	107	
Majority		313	
Turnout			
SNP gain from Labour			

Ward 42: Knightswood
Party	Candidate	Votes	%
SNP	J. Bain	1,642	
Labour	O. J. Davidson (Incumbent)	1,472	
Conservative	J. R. Howie	1,430	
SLP	C. Gordon	222	
Communist	D. Mackenzie	60	
Majority		170	
Turnout			
SNP gain from Labour			

Ward 43: Gorbals
Party	Candidate	Votes	%
Labour	J. Lavelle (Incumbent)	1,494	
SNP	T. P. McPhillips	1,198	
Communist	D. Elliot	99	
Majority		296	
Turnout			

Ward 44: Hutchesontown
Party	Candidate	Votes	%
SNP	G. McAulay	1,106	
Labour	Catherine Cantley (Incumbent)	894	
Conservative	F. Phillips	466	
Communist	D. Mackenzie	292	
Majority		212	
Turnout			
SNP gain from Labour			

Ward 45: Crosshill
Party	Candidate	Votes	%
Conservative	A. Green	1,953	
SNP	C. Campbell	1,630	
Labour	J. Barr	1,165	
Communist	K. Haldane	81	
Majority		323	
Turnout			

Ward 46: Prospecthill
Party	Candidate	Votes	%
SNP	W. McGuinness	2,272	
Labour	M. Moore	2,169	
Communist	D. Mackenzie	166	
Majority		103	
Turnout			
SNP gain from Labour			

Ward 47: Drumoyne
Party	Candidate	Votes	%
Labour	H. M. McNeill (Incumbent)	1,725	
SNP	Brenda Carson	1,337	
Conservative	Christina Brotherston	893	
Majority		388	
Turnout			

Ward 48: Fairfield
Party	Candidate	Votes	%
Labour	J. McDonald (Incumbent)	1,432	
SNP	C. McKenna	963	
Communist	D. McGeoch	45	
Majority		469	
Turnout			

Ward 49: Ibrox
Party	Candidate	Votes	%
Labour	A. McMahon (Incumbent)	2,200	
SNP	R. P. Mottram	1,831	
Conservative	L. Connolly	958	
Majority		369	
Turnout			

Ward 50: Kingston
Party	Candidate	Votes	%
Labour	B. A. Maan (Incumbent)	697	
SNP	A. Mitchell	327	
SLP	D. Deans	313	
Conservative	M. A. Hamid	137	
Majority		370	
Turnout			

Ward 51: Hillington
Party	Candidate	Votes	%
Labour	M. Kelly	2,817	
Conservative	R. Anderson	2,182	
SNP	Sheila Watterson	1,920	
Majority		635	
Turnout			

Ward 52: Bellahouston
Party	Candidate	Votes	%
Conservative	Christine R. Campbell	2,422	
Labour	N. Topping	1,560	
SNP	W. J. Reynolds	1,492	
Majority		862	
Turnout			
Conservative gain from Labour			

Ward 53: Cardonald
Party	Candidate	Votes	%
Conservative	A. Mackenzie	2,186	
Labour	Jean Allan	1,327	
Liberal	M. Kibby	258	
SNP	D. McBain	110	
Majority		759	
Turnout			
Conservative gain from Labour			

Ward 54: Crookston
Party	Candidate	Votes	%
Labour	T. R. Hamilton (Incumbent)	2,360	
SNP	H. Broghan	1,686	
Conservative	Catherine M. Mair	870	
Majority		674	
Turnout			

Ward 55: Pollokshields
Party	Candidate	Votes	%
Conservative	I. J. A. Dyer (Incumbent)	3,583	
SNP	A. M. Martin	1,042	
Labour	F. Craig	796	
Liberal	G. McKell	232	
Communist	F. J. McCloskey	84	
Majority		2,541	
Turnout			

Ward 56: Strathbungo
Party	Candidate	Votes	%
Conservative	Jean M. Hamilton	1,636	
SNP	Sheila McIntosh	1,130	
Labour	A. Irvine	734	
Liberal	R. McIntyre	120	
Majority		506	
Turnout			

Ward 57: Camphill
Party	Candidate	Votes	%
Conservative	J. K. Richmond (Incumbent)	2,617	
SNP	C. N. Birnie	801	
Labour	Margaret Brown	569	
Liberal	G. Ross	121	
Majority		1,816	
Turnout			

Ward 58: Pollokshaws
Party	Candidate	Votes	%
Conservative	Helen Hodgins	2,425	
Labour	J. F. Dunnachie (Incumbent)	2,116	
SNP	C. Graham	1,783	
Liberal	D. C. Anderson	134	
Majority		309	
Turnout			
Conservative gain from Labour			

Ward 59: Nitshill
Party	Candidate	Votes	%
Labour	F. Duffy (Incumbent)	1,853	
SNP	A. McIntosh	1,684	
Conservative	Catherine Lyon	481	
Communist	T. Biggam	151	
Liberal	P. C. Togneri	36	
Majority		205	
Turnout			

Ward 60: Darnley
Party	Candidate	Votes	%
SNP	F. Hannigan (Incumbent)	2,474	
Labour	A. Mutrie	1,599	
Conservative	Jenny E. F. Taylor	434	
SLP	J. Farrell	299	
Communist	A. Campbell	71	
Majority		875	
Turnout			

Ward 61: Newlands
Party	Candidate	Votes	%
Conservative	J. Young (Incumbent)	3,661	
SNP	N. Logan	653	
Labour	Rose McCloy	520	
Majority		3,008	
Turnout			

Ward 62: Mount Florida
Party	Candidate	Votes	%
Conservative	D. Mason (Incumbent)	2,350	
Labour	I. McNally	777	
SNP	Grace L. Logan	671	
Liberal	Moira Aitchison	123	
Majority		1,573	
Turnout			

Ward 63: King's Park
Party	Candidate	Votes	%
Conservative	M. Toshner (Incumbent)	2,461	
SNP	Heather Ewing	1,329	
Labour	M. J. Cunningham	558	
Liberal	A. Young	222	
Majority		1,132	
Turnout			

Ward 64: Castlemilk
Party	Candidate	Votes	%
Labour	G. Manson (Incumbent)	1,575	
SNP	W. A. Steven	1,176	
Conservative	Philomena A. Leven	803	
Communist	Iris Macdonald	105	
Majority		399	
Turnout			

Ward 65: Linn
Party	Candidate	Votes	%
Conservative	L. Gourlay (Incumbent)	2,181	
Labour	R. Macdonald	1,151	
SNP	A. Ogg	1,078	
Majority		1,030	
Turnout			

Ward 66: Cathkin
Party	Candidate	Votes	%
SNP	Brenda Johnson	1,179	
Labour	P. J. Lally (Incumbent)	1,147	
Conservative	A. Leven	625	
Communist	A. Hamilton	85	
Majority		32	
Turnout			
SNP gain from Labour			

Ward 67: Rutherglen South
Party	Candidate	Votes	%
Liberal	R. E. Brown	1,975	
SNP	Marie Bulloch	1,274	
Free Thinking Democratic Conservative	A. McCue	1,172	
Labour	J. R. Watson (Incumbent)	1,135	
Majority		701	
Turnout			
Liberal gain from Labour			

Ward 68: Rutherglen North
Party	Candidate	Votes	%
SNP	J. Bulloch	1,608	
Conservative	Christine MacInnes	1,564	
Labour	A. Moffat (Incumbent)	1,528	
Liberal	D. Nevin	272	
Majority		44	
Turnout			
SNP gain from Labour			

Ward 69: Baillieston/Garrowhill
Party	Candidate	Votes	%
Conservative	J. Reynolds (Incumbent)	2,099	
Labour	J. McGuigan	1,787	
SNP	W. Wright	1,690	
Liberal	Pauline Clarke	183	
Majority		312	
Turnout			

Ward 70: Carmyle/Springboig
Party	Candidate	Votes	%
SNP	J. Campbell	1,631	
Labour	Ellen McCulloch	1,231	
Conservative	A. Percy	1,164	
Liberal	D. Turner	625	
Majority		467	
Turnout			
SNP gain from Labour			

Ward 71: Cambuslang East
Party	Candidate	Votes	%
Conservative	A. R. James	2,679	
Labour	Helen McElhinney (Incumbent)	2,175	
SNP	Christine Latta	2,027	
Majority		504	
Turnout			
Conservative gain from Labour			

Ward 72: Cambuslang West
Party	Candidate	Votes	%
Conservative	J. Taylor (Incumbent)	2,666	
Labour	E. Johnson	2,063	
SNP	Adeline Murray	2,044	
Majority		603	
Turnout			

== Aftermath ==
While Labour still had the largest number of councillors, the party decided not to try retain power rejecting the possibility of coalition deals with either the Conservatives or the SNP. This paved the way for the Conservatives to form a minority administration, although they also refused to work with the SNP. The SNP group leader Frank Hannigan, reacted angrily to Labour's decision and called on their councillors to resign. He argued they had "ratted on their own voters" by handing power to the Conservatives who had won just 28% of the vote. This meant what would happen at the first meeting of the council was uncertain

When the Council met on 9 May SNP abstentions meant that Labour's nominee David Hodge was elected Lord Provost of Glasgow over the Conservatives' Jack Richmond. As the Conservatives had said that they would only form an administration if their candidate was elected as Lord Provost, this caused an uncertain situation. Ultimately Richmond urged his colleagues to form an administration nonetheless and they eventually agreed to do this after an internal vote among the Conservative group. However it was noted in The Glasgow Herald that many of their policies, including the sale of council houses, were unlikely to be supported by the majority on the council.

Ultimately the Conservative administration proved unstable and resigned in September 1979, paving the way for a minority Labour administration to take over. In 1980 The Glasgow Herald claimed that the three years of political uncertainty since the 1977 election meant Glasgow District Council had "gained an unenviable reputation for chaos and outrageous behaviour among its members". It further branded the situation "the longest running comedy show in the city" with one notorious incident seeing a Conservative councillor hiding in a chimney-piece during a meeting to "confuse a vote".
