= 1980 City of Glasgow District Council election =

1980 Scottish local government election

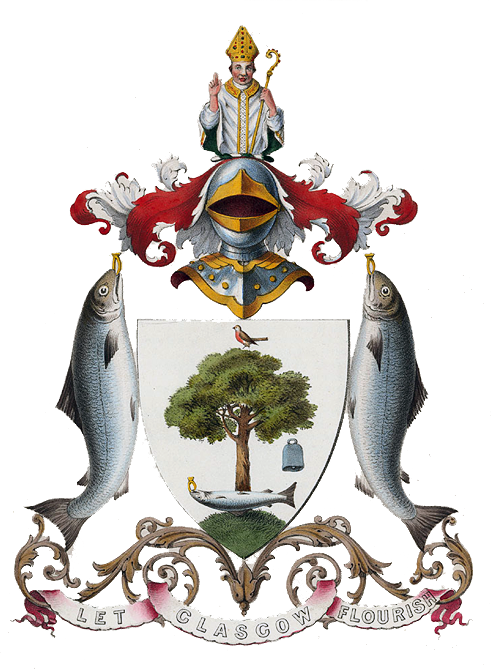
| ← 1977 | 1 May 1980 | 1984 → |

All 72 seats to City of Glasgow District Council 37 seats needed for a majority
| | First party | Second party | Third party |
|---|---|---|---|
| Party | Labour | Conservative | Liberal |
| Last election | 30 seats, 35.1% | 25 seats, 28.7% | 1 seat, 1.9% |
| Seats won | 58 | 11 | 3 |
| Seat change | ▲28 | ▼14 | ▲2 |
| Popular vote | 139,471 | 55,816 | 14,712 |
| Percentage | 54.7% | 21.9% | 5.8% |
| Swing | ▲19.6% | ▼6.8% | ▲3.9% |
Council Leader before election
No overall control
Elected Council Leader
Labour

The 1980 City of Glasgow District Council election took place on 1 May 1980, alongside elections to the councils of Scotland's various other districts. This was the third election to the City of Glasgow District Council.

== Background ==
The previous election, held in 1977, had seen Labour lose its majority on the council and while the party still had the largest number of councillors (30), the Labour group decided not to try retain power after rejecting the possibility of coalition deals with either the Conservatives or the SNP. This left the second placed Conservatives to form a minority administration, although they also refused to work with the SNP and prior to the first meeting of the council after the election it was uncertain what would happen. Ultimately the Council met on 9 May 1977, SNP abstentions meant that Labour's nominee David Hodge was elected Lord Provost of Glasgow over the Conservatives Jack Richmond. Although the Conservatives had said that they would only form an administration if Richmond was elected as Lord Provost, after an internal vote among the Conservative group they decided that they would form an administration after all. However it was noted in The Glasgow Herald that many of the Conservatives policies, including the sale of council houses, were unlikely to be supported by the majority on the council.

Ultimately, lacking support from other parties, the Conservative administration announced it would relinquish power in September 1979 after the Council rejected its plan to cut spending by up to £30 million pounds, paving the way for Labour to form a minority administration. According to The Glasgow Herald the political uncertainty since the 1977 election meant "Glasgow District Council has gained an unenviable reputation for chaos and outrageous behaviour among its members."

By the time of the election as a result of by-elections and other changes Labour held 32 seats to the Conservatives 22, the SNP's 14 and the Liberal Party's one. There were two independent councillors and one seat was vacant. Ahead of the election, the Herald reported that Labour were confident of success, with the party hopeful of gaining up to 20 seats, which would give them a large majority.

== Results ==
1980 City of Glasgow District Council election result
| Party | Seats | Gains | Losses | Net gain/loss | Seats % | Votes % | Votes | +/− |
|---|---|---|---|---|---|---|---|---|
| Labour | 58 | 28 | 0 | ▲28 | 80.6 | 54.7 | 139,471 | ▲19.6 |
| Conservative | 11 | 0 | 14 | ▼14 | 15.3 | 21.9 | 55,816 | ▼6.8 |
| Liberal | 3 | 2 | 0 | ▲2 | 4.2 | 5.8 | 14,712 | ▲3.9 |
| SNP | 0 | 0 | 16 | ▼16 | 0.0 | 15.9 | 40,639 | ▼16.8 |
| Communist | 0 | 0 | 0 | Steady | 0.0 | 0.9 | 2,325 | ▼0.7 |
| Independent | 0 | 0 | 0 | Steady | 0.0 | 0.2 | 436 | New |
| Other parties | 0 | 0 | 0 | Steady | 0.0 | 0.5 | 1,431 | |

== Ward results ==
Ward 1: Tollcross
| Party | Candidate | Votes | % |
|---|---|---|---|
| Labour | M. Adam | 2,416 | |
| Conservative | Mary Tindley | 979 | |
| SNP | N. Logan | 602 | |
| Majority | | 1,437 | |
| Turnout | | | |

Ward 2: Parkhead
| Party | Candidate | Votes | % |
|---|---|---|---|
| Labour | Susan Baird (Incumbent) | 2,492 | |
| Conservative | P.M Tindley | 496 | |
| SNP | Grace Logan | 439 | |
| Majority | | 1,996 | |
| Turnout | | | |

Ward 3: Carntyne
| Party | Candidate | Votes | % |
|---|---|---|---|
| Labour | H. Macrae (Incumbent) | 2,546 | |
| SNP | A. Livingstone | 567 | |
| Conservative | B.S. Clarke | 469 | |
| Majority | | 1,979 | |
| Turnout | | | |

Ward 4: Camlachie
| Party | Candidate | Votes | % |
|---|---|---|---|
| Labour | R. MacDonald | 991 | |
| Local Independent Labour | A. J. McTaggart (Incumbent) | 209 | |
| SNP | Margaret Humble | 199 | |
| Conservative | E. Griffith | 193 | |
| Majority | | 782 | |
| Turnout | | | |

Ward 5: Easterhouse
| Party | Candidate | Votes | % |
|---|---|---|---|
| Labour | W. Milligan | 2,282 | |
| SNP | Patricia Kennedy (Incumbent) | 958 | |
| Conservative | Margaret Watt | 112 | |
| Communist | G. Cleland | 68 | |
| Majority | | 1,324 | |
| Turnout | | | |
| Labour gain from SNP | | | |

Ward 6: Garthamlock
| Party | Candidate | Votes | % |
|---|---|---|---|
| Labour | D. Murphy | 2,993 | |
| SNP | D. Whyteside | 332 | |
| Ind Scot Nat | E. Hendry (Incumbent) | 332 | |
| Communist | J. Jackson | 184 | |
| Conservative | Isobel Russell | 169 | |
| Majority | | 2,617 | |
| Turnout | | | |
| Labour gain from SNP | | | |

Ward 7: Wellhouse
| Party | Candidate | Votes | % |
|---|---|---|---|
| Labour | N. Stobo (Incumbent) | 2,642 | |
| SNP | W. Logan | 339 | |
| Liberal | E. Bennett | 336 | |
| Conservative | Violet Fletcher | 129 | |
| Communist | D. McGregor | 82 | |
| Majority | | 2,303 | |
| Turnout | | | |

Ward 8: Queenslie
| Party | Candidate | Votes | % |
|---|---|---|---|
| Labour | W. Fay | 2,312 | |
| SNP | A. Hart | 818 | |
| Conservative | T. Steven | 112 | |
| Majority | | 1,594 | |
| Turnout | | | |
| Labour gain from SNP | | | |

Ward 9: Riddrie
| Party | Candidate | Votes | % |
|---|---|---|---|
| Labour | A. S. Livingstone | 2,312 | |
| Conservative | C. Gilbert (Incumbent) | 1,573 | |
| SNP | J. Cockburn | 490 | |
| Communist | J. Cockburn | 61 | |
| Majority | | 445 | |
| Turnout | | | |
| Labour gain from Conservative | | | |

Ward 10: Lethamhill
| Party | Candidate | Votes | % |
|---|---|---|---|
| Labour | D. Mason (Incumbent) | 1,635 | |
| SNP | A. Downie | 395 | |
| Conservative | Alison MacGregor | 121 | |
| Majority | | 1,240 | |
| Turnout | | | |

Ward 11: City
| Party | Candidate | Votes | % |
|---|---|---|---|
| Labour | T. Ennis (Incumbent) | 1,497 | |
| Conservative | Mary Herman | 345 | |
| Independent | Elizabeth Hunter | 78 | |
| Majority | | 1,152 | |
| Turnout | | | |

Ward 12: Townhead
| Party | Candidate | Votes | % |
|---|---|---|---|
| Labour | P. O'Rourke (Incumbent) | 1,546 | |
| Conservative | A. Harvey | 173 | |
| Majority | | 1,373 | |
| Turnout | | | |

Ward 13: Calton
| Party | Candidate | Votes | % |
|---|---|---|---|
| Labour | J.T.G. McQueenie (Incumbent) | 928 | |
| SNP | Stephanie C. Shiels | 96 | |
| Conservative | R.H. Dickson | 86 | |
| Communist | W. Spraggen | 39 | |
| Majority | | 832 | |
| Turnout | | | |

Ward 14: Dalmarnock
| Party | Candidate | Votes | % |
|---|---|---|---|
| Labour | J. Mullen (Incumbent) | 1,814 | |
| Conservative | J. G. Harris | 207 | |
| Majority | | 1,607 | |
| Turnout | | | |

Ward 15: Balornock
| Party | Candidate | Votes | % |
|---|---|---|---|
| Labour | D. Crozier (Incumbent) | 2,279 | |
| SNP | C. Donaldson | 463 | |
| Liberal | J. Kearns | 417 | |
| Communist | J. Brown | 68 | |
| Majority | | 1,816 | |
| Turnout | | | |

Ward 16: Robroyston
| Party | Candidate | Votes | % |
|---|---|---|---|
| Labour | J. Chatham (Incumbent) | 2,542 | |
| SNP | I.S. Hunter | 485 | |
| Communist | P.Taylor | 38 | |
| Majority | | 2,057 | |
| Turnout | | | |

Ward 17: Cowlairs
| Party | Candidate | Votes | % |
|---|---|---|---|
| Labour | C. Moore (Incumbent) | 488 | |
| SNP | D.A. Shaw | 163 | |
| Majority | | 325 | |
| Turnout | | | |

Ward 18: Petershill
| Party | Candidate | Votes | % |
|---|---|---|---|
| Labour | J. Henderson (Incumbent) | 1,686 | |
| SNP | W. J. Morton | 368 | |
| Communist | W. Moir | 46 | |
| Majority | | 1,318 | |
| Turnout | | | |

Ward 19: Milnbank
| Party | Candidate | Votes | % |
|---|---|---|---|
| Labour | J. McLean (Incumbent) | 2,092 | |
| Milnbank Progressive Conservative and Unionist | J. J. Wallace | 469 | |
| Communist | I. Donnolly | 51 | |
| Majority | | 1,623 | |
| Turnout | | | |

Ward 20: Dennistoun
| Party | Candidate | Votes | % |
|---|---|---|---|
| Labour | C. Brown | 2,445 | |
| Conservative | R. McKay (Incumbent) | 2,209 | |
| SNP | J. S. Winning | 264 | |
| Communist | W. Moir | 49 | |
| Independent Scottish Labour | D. McAleer | 35 | |
| Majority | | 236 | |
| Turnout | | | |
| Labour gain from Conservative | | | |

Ward 21: Summerston
| Party | Candidate | Votes | % |
|---|---|---|---|
| Labour | M. Buchanan | 2,600 | |
| SNP | S. M. Ewing (Incumbent) | 1,812 | |
| Liberal | Elspeth Attwooll | 382 | |
| Conservative | G. Paterson | 256 | |
| Communist | J. O'Rourke | 59 | |
| Majority | | 788 | |
| Turnout | | | |
| Labour gain from SNP | | | |

Ward 22: Wyndford
| Party | Candidate | Votes | % |
|---|---|---|---|
| Labour | R. Gray (Incumbent) | 1,900 | |
| Conservative | M. White | 419 | |
| Liberal | J. P. Kelly | 280 | |
| Communist | P. B. Smith | 54 | |
| Majority | | 1,481 | |
| Turnout | | | |

Ward 23: Ruchill
| Party | Candidate | Votes | % |
|---|---|---|---|
| Labour | J. Gaffney | 2,376 | |
| SNP | Helen Gough | 701 | |
| Communist | M. Meers | 70 | |
| Majority | | 1,675 | |
| Turnout | | | |

Ward 24: Milton
| Party | Candidate | Votes | % |
|---|---|---|---|
| Labour | A. McGarrity | 2,297 | |
| SNP | A. Sheer | 703 | |
| Communist | E. Graham | 66 | |
| Majority | | 1,594 | |
| Turnout | | | |

Ward 25: Possilpark
| Party | Candidate | Votes | % |
|---|---|---|---|
| Labour | R. Innes (Incumbent) | 2,862 | |
| Communist | D. Shannon | 123 | |
| Majority | | 2,739 | |
| Turnout | | | |

Ward 26: Cowcaddens
| Party | Candidate | Votes | % |
|---|---|---|---|
| Labour | Jean McFadden (Incumbent) | 2,747 | |
| SNP | T. Scouller | 497 | |
| Liberal | R. W. Stewart | 206 | |
| Communist | P. Murray | 58 | |
| Majority | | 2,250 | |
| Turnout | | | |

Ward 27: Botanic Gardens
| Party | Candidate | Votes | % |
|---|---|---|---|
| Conservative | Mary Goldie (Incumbent) | 944 | |
| Labour | J. Lafferty | 736 | |
| Communist | Eirene Morrison | 78 | |
| Majority | | 208 | |
| Turnout | | | |

Ward 28: Park
| Party | Candidate | Votes | % |
|---|---|---|---|
| Labour | D. Brown | 1,461 | |
| Conservative | Dorothy Henderson | 1,099 | |
| Ecology | J. F. Robins | 242 | |
| Communist | D. Laing | 99 | |
| Majority | | 362 | |
| Turnout | | | |
| Labour gain from Conservative | | | |

Ward 29: Kelvin
| Party | Candidate | Votes | % |
|---|---|---|---|
| Labour | D. Crawford (Incumbent) | 727 | |
| Independent | L. Hazra | 332 | |
| Conservative | J. Proctor | 286 | |
| Independent Social Democrat | B. Edwards | 26 | |
| Majority | | 395 | |
| Turnout | | | |

Ward 30: Woodside
| Party | Candidate | Votes | % |
|---|---|---|---|
| Labour | P. Taylor | 1,112 | |
| Conservative | Elizabeth Rennie | 497 | |
| Majority | | 615 | |
| Turnout | | | |
| Labour gain from Conservative | | | |

Ward 31: Partick East
| Party | Candidate | Votes | % |
|---|---|---|---|
| Labour | T. Schuller | 1,485 | |
| Conservative | D. Wood (Incumbent) | 1,030 | |
| SNP | G. Mackellar | 571 | |
| Communist | C. Woolfson | 99 | |
| Majority | | 455 | |
| Turnout | | | |
| Labour gain from Conservative | | | |

Ward 32: Anderston
| Party | Candidate | Votes | % |
|---|---|---|---|
| Labour | R. McTaggart (Incumbent) | 1,932 | |
| Conservative | B. D. Cooklin | 543 | |
| Communist | A. Jackson | 106 | |
| Majority | | 1,388 | |
| Turnout | | | |

Ward 33: Anniesland
| Party | Candidate | Votes | % |
|---|---|---|---|
| Conservative | W. Aitken (Incumbent) | 2,440 | |
| Labour | Patricia Chalmers | 697 | |
| Liberal | L. J. Clarke | 497 | |
| SNP | N. M. T. M. MacLeod | 549 | |
| Majority | | 1,743 | |
| Turnout | | | |

Ward 34: Kelvinside
| Party | Candidate | Votes | % |
|---|---|---|---|
| Conservative | R. N. S. Logan (Incumbent) | 2,389 | |
| Labour | R. A. Mowbray | 699 | |
| Liberal | S. Donaldson | 644 | |
| SNP | G. Fairbrother | 279 | |
| Majority | | 1,690 | |
| Turnout | | | |

Ward 35: Scotstoun
| Party | Candidate | Votes | % |
|---|---|---|---|
| Labour | W. R. Hattan | 3,125 | |
| Conservative | Winifred C. Childs | 1,892 | |
| SNP | J. Lang | 608 | |
| Liberal | R. Dunne | 228 | |
| Majority | | 1,233 | |
| Turnout | | | |
| Labour gain from Conservative | | | |

Ward 36: Partick West
| Party | Candidate | Votes | % |
|---|---|---|---|
| Conservative | A. H. Hodgins (Incumbent) | 2,079 | |
| Labour | A. Cowan | 1,565 | |
| SNP | J. Crawford | 716 | |
| Liberal | Joyce Polson | 241 | |
| Majority | | 514 | |
| Turnout | | | |

Ward 37: Drumry
| Party | Candidate | Votes | % |
|---|---|---|---|
| Labour | Marjorie O'Neill | 2,143 | |
| SNP | Marion Crawford (Incumbent) | 1,274 | |
| Communist | A. Munro | 72 | |
| Majority | | 869 | |
| Turnout | | | |
| Labour gain from SNP | | | |

Ward 38: Summerhill
| Party | Candidate | Votes | % |
|---|---|---|---|
| Labour | D. P. Wiseman | 2,148 | |
| SNP | J. O'Brien (Incumbent) | 1,093 | |
| Communist | J. McCarry | 129 | |
| Majority | | 1,055 | |
| Turnout | | | |
| Labour gain from SNP | | | |

Ward 39: Blairdardle
| Party | Candidate | Votes | % |
|---|---|---|---|
| Labour | Catherine Fyfe | 1,774 | |
| Conservative | I. M. Lawson | 1,011 | |
| SNP | J. C. Whyte (Incumbent) | 842 | |
| Majority | | 763 | |
| Turnout | | | |
| Labour gain from SNP | | | |

Ward 40: Knightcliffe
| Party | Candidate | Votes | % |
|---|---|---|---|
| Labour | J. Kernaghan | 2,085 | |
| SNP | C. Darroch (Incumbent) | 1,486 | |
| Conservative | L. M. Turpie | 550 | |
| Majority | | 599 | |
| Turnout | | | |
| Labour gain from SNP | | | |

Ward 41: Yoker
| Party | Candidate | Votes | % |
|---|---|---|---|
| Labour | T. Lenehan | 2,188 | |
| SNP | D. McLean (Incumbent) | 2,078 | |
| Conservative | D. Gibson | 351 | |
| Majority | | 110 | |
| Turnout | | | |
| Labour gain from SNP | | | |

Ward 42: Knightswood
| Party | Candidate | Votes | % |
|---|---|---|---|
| Labour | C. J. Davison | 2,035 | |
| SNP | J. Bain (Incumbent) | 1,482 | |
| Conservative | Celia Anne Lawson | 801 | |
| Communist | L. D. Bain | 138 | |
| Majority | | 553 | |
| Turnout | | | |
| Labour gain from SNP | | | |

Ward 43: Gorbals
| Party | Candidate | Votes | % |
|---|---|---|---|
| Labour | J. Lavelle (Incumbent) | 1,649 | |
| SNP | D. H. Waddell | 376 | |
| Conservative | D. G. Milne | 250 | |
| Communist | A. D. Elliot | 37 | |
| Majority | | 1,273 | |
| Turnout | | | |

Ward 44: Hutchesontown
| Party | Candidate | Votes | % |
|---|---|---|---|
| Labour | M. Moore | 1,823 | |
| SLP | J. Brown | 541 | |
| SNP | Josephine Docherty | 204 | |
| Conservative | F. Phillips | 135 | |
| Communist | J. Kay | 70 | |
| Majority | | 1,282 | |
| Turnout | | | |
| Labour gain from SNP | | | |

Ward 45: Crosshill
| Party | Candidate | Votes | % |
|---|---|---|---|
| Conservative | A. Green (Incumbent) | 1,623 | |
| Labour | S. Butt | 1,482 | |
| SNP | C. B. Campbell | 939 | |
| Communist | K. Haldane | 64 | |
| Majority | | 141 | |
| Turnout | | | |

Ward 46: Prospecthill
| Party | Candidate | Votes | % |
|---|---|---|---|
| Labour | C. Toppin | 2,317 | |
| SNP | W. McGuinness (Incumbent) | 1,635 | |
| Conservative | D. I. Gennis | 515 | |
| Communist | J. McGoldrick | 69 | |
| Majority | | 682 | |
| Turnout | | | |
| Labour gain from SNP | | | |

Ward 47: Drumoyne
| Party | Candidate | Votes | % |
|---|---|---|---|
| Labour | J. Barr | 2,194 | |
| Conservative | J. H. Walker | 505 | |
| SNP | A. F. Butler | 379 | |
| Majority | | 1,689 | |
| Turnout | | | |

Ward 48: Fairfield
| Party | Candidate | Votes | % |
|---|---|---|---|
| Labour | P. T. Keegan (Incumbent) | 1,120 | |
| SNP | S. Butler | 205 | |
| Conservative | G. W. McCaul | 121 | |
| Communist | J. Foster | 57 | |
| Majority | | 915 | |
| Turnout | | | |

Ward 49: Ibrox
| Party | Candidate | Votes | % |
|---|---|---|---|
| Labour | A. Young | 3,329 | |
| Conservative | Margaret Turnbull | 594 | |
| SNP | A. Cullen | 469 | |
| Majority | | 2,735 | |
| Turnout | | | |

Ward 50: Kingston
| Party | Candidate | Votes | % |
|---|---|---|---|
| Labour | B. Maan (Incumbent) | 493 | |
| SNP | J. Strang | 255 | |
| Conservative | L. Connolly | 73 | |
| Majority | | 238 | |
| Turnout | | | |

Ward 51: Hillington
| Party | Candidate | Votes | % |
|---|---|---|---|
| Labour | M. Kelly (Incumbent) | 4,059 | |
| Conservative | Jean Nixon | 1,346 | |
| SNP | W. A. Houston | 1,112 | |
| Majority | | 2,713 | |
| Turnout | | | |

Ward 52: Bellahouston
| Party | Candidate | Votes | % |
|---|---|---|---|
| Labour | J. F. Ross (Incumbent) | 2,278 | |
| Conservative | A. McIntyre | 1,726 | |
| SNP | K. Fee | 639 | |
| Majority | | 552 | |
| Turnout | | | |

Ward 53: Cardonald
| Party | Candidate | Votes | % |
|---|---|---|---|
| Labour | R. Keenan | 1,965 | |
| Conservative | A. Mackenzie (Incumbent) | 1,848 | |
| SNP | Katherine McKillen | 458 | |
| Majority | | 171 | |
| Turnout | | | |
| Labour gain from Conservative | | | |

Ward 54: Crookston
| Party | Candidate | Votes | % |
|---|---|---|---|
| Labour | T. R. Hamilton (Incumbent) | 3,370 | |
| SNP | H. Brogan | 854 | |
| Majority | | 2,156 | |
| Turnout | | | |

Ward 55: Pollockshields
| Party | Candidate | Votes | % |
|---|---|---|---|
| Conservative | J.A Dyer (Incumbent) | 2,656 | |
| Labour | E. Nolan | 1,097 | |
| Liberal | G. A. McKell | 688 | |
| SNP | Eirene Morrison | 257 | |
| Communist | J. Campbell | 82 | |
| Majority | | 1,559 | |
| Turnout | | | |

Ward 56: Strathbungo
| Party | Candidate | Votes | % |
|---|---|---|---|
| Conservative | Jean Hamilton (Incumbent) | 1,251 | |
| Labour | B. Sweeney | 1,090 | |
| SNP | I. C. Murray | 438 | |
| Majority | | 161 | |
| Turnout | | | |

Ward 57: Camphill
| Party | Candidate | Votes | % |
|---|---|---|---|
| Conservative | J. K. Richmond (Incumbent) | 1,965 | |
| Labour | J. Keating | 1,008 | |
| SNP | A. C. Yeoman | 304 | |
| Majority | | 957 | |
| Turnout | | | |

Ward 58: Pollockshaws
| Party | Candidate | Votes | % |
|---|---|---|---|
| Labour | J. McNally | 2,563 | |
| Conservative | Helen Hodgins (Incumbent) | 2,436 | |
| SNP | A. J. Dornan | 695 | |
| Scottish Independent Labour | S. Walsh | 39 | |
| Majority | | 127 | |
| Turnout | | | |
| Labour gain from Conservative | | | |

Ward 59: Nitshill
| Party | Candidate | Votes | % |
|---|---|---|---|
| Labour | Rose McCloy | 2,966 | |
| SNP | Catherine McMunnigal | 613 | |
| Conservative | Catherine M. Mair | 230 | |
| Majority | | 2,353 | |
| Turnout | | | |

Ward 60: Darnley
| Party | Candidate | Votes | % |
|---|---|---|---|
| Labour | J. McCarron | 2,683 | |
| SNP | F. Hannigan (Incumbent) | 2,472 | |
| Conservative | Jenny Taylor | 289 | |
| Liberal | A. S. Donnell | 118 | |
| Scottish Independent Labour | I. McIntyre | 39 | |
| Majority | | 211 | |
| Turnout | | | |
| Labour gain from SNP | | | |

Ward 61: Newlands
| Party | Candidate | Votes | % |
|---|---|---|---|
| Conservative | J. Young (Incumbent) | 3,022 | |
| Labour | T. Muir | 908 | |
| Majority | | 2,114 | |
| Turnout | | | |

Ward 62: Mount Florida
| Party | Candidate | Votes | % |
|---|---|---|---|
| Conservative | D. S. Mason (Incumbent) | 1,829 | |
| Labour | C. O'Driscoll | 1,184 | |
| SNP | D. Robinson | 416 | |
| Majority | | 645 | |
| Turnout | | | |

Ward 63: King's Park
| Party | Candidate | Votes | % |
|---|---|---|---|
| Conservative | M. Toshner (Incumbent) | 1,771 | |
| Labour | R. Meechan | 1,071 | |
| Liberal | B. Hamford | 477 | |
| SNP | W. Davidson | 454 | |
| Majority | | 700 | |
| Turnout | | | |

Ward 64: Castlemilk
| Party | Candidate | Votes | % |
|---|---|---|---|
| Labour | G. Manson (Incumbent) | 2,424 | |
| SNP | W. Steven | 596 | |
| Conservative | Jean Walker | 231 | |
| Communist | W. Davidson | 60 | |
| Majority | | 1828 | |
| Turnout | | | |

Ward 65: Linn
| Party | Candidate | Votes | % |
|---|---|---|---|
| Labour | P. Lally | 1,847 | |
| Conservative | L. Gourlay (Incumbent) | 1,775 | |
| SNP | J. P. Johnson | 497 | |
| Majority | | 72 | |
| Turnout | | | |
| Labour gain from Conservative | | | |

Ward 66: Cathkin
| Party | Candidate | Votes | % |
|---|---|---|---|
| Labour | Catherine Houston | 1,692 | |
| SNP | Brenda Y. Johnson (Incumbent) | 1,010 | |
| Conservative | Maisie M. Dean | 167 | |
| Majority | | 682 | |
| Turnout | | | |
| Labour gain from SNP | | | |

Ward 67: Rutherglen South
| Party | Candidate | Votes | % |
|---|---|---|---|
| Liberal | R. E. Brown (Incumbent) | 3,538 | |
| Labour | Margaret Robinson | 1,231 | |
| SNP | I MacAllister | 240 | |
| Communist | M. Dean | 49 | |
| Majority | | 2,307 | |
| Turnout | | | |

Ward 68: Rutherglen North
| Party | Candidate | Votes | % |
|---|---|---|---|
| Liberal | Gretel Ross | 2,099 | |
| Labour | Anne McAvoy | 1,850 | |
| Conservative | Christine MacInnes | 561 | |
| SNP | F. R. MacLean (Incumbent) | 400 | |
| Majority | | 249 | |
| Turnout | | | |
| Liberal gain from SNP | | | |

Ward 69: Baillieston/Garrowhill
| Party | Candidate | Votes | % |
|---|---|---|---|
| Labour | Sarah Hatton | 2,127 | |
| Conservative | J. Reynolds (Incumbent) | 1,558 | |
| SNP | Jane Watt | 552 | |
| Liberal | Pauline Clark | 260 | |
| Majority | | 569 | |
| Turnout | | | |
| Labour gain from Conservative | | | |

Ward 70: Carmyle/Springboig
| Party | Candidate | Votes | % |
|---|---|---|---|
| Labour | C. McNicol | 1,999 | |
| SNP | J. Campbell (Incumbent) | 1,128 | |
| Liberal | D. Turner | 859 | |
| Majority | | 871 | |
| Turnout | | | |
| Labour gain from SNP | | | |

Ward 71: Cambuslang East
| Party | Candidate | Votes | % |
|---|---|---|---|
| Labour | R. McKenzie | 2,740 | |
| Conservative | D. Houston (Incumbent) | 1,558 | |
| SNP | J. Taylor | 790 | |
| Liberal | D. Cousins | 600 | |
| Majority | | 1,182 | |
| Turnout | | | |
| Labour gain from Conservative | | | |

Ward 72: Cambuslang West
| Party | Candidate | Votes | % |
|---|---|---|---|
| Liberal | M. Kibby | 2,842 | |
| Labour | J. Handibode | 2,583 | |
| Conservative | J. D. D. Taylor (Incumbent) | 1,293 | |
| SNP | G. Clark | 539 | |
| Majority | | 259 | |
| Turnout | | | |
| Liberal gain from Conservative | | | |

== Outcome ==
Labour won a decisive victory gaining 26 seats to give them a 44 seat majority over all other parties. The SNP lost all of their seats while the Conservatives lost 11 of the 22 seats they held. The Liberals gained two seats (one from the Conservatives and one from the SNP). The Glasgow Herald observed the result was even more spectacular for Labour than had been predicted and attributed this to voters wishing to see an end to "the City Chambers comedy show" of the last few years. It also attributed the Labour gains from the Conservatives, which were reflected in other parts of Scotland, as a result of the unpopularity of Margaret Thatcher's government, which had been in power for one year.

Several prominent Conservative and SNP councillors lost their seats including the SNP's Stewart Ewing, who had in 1977 defeated the Labour group leader, and the Conservative former housing convener Derek Wood.
