= 1995 Glasgow City Council election =

1995 Scottish local government election

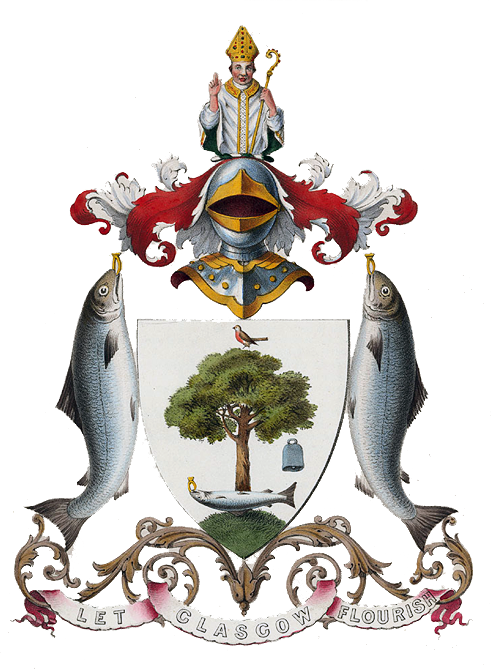
← 1992	5 May 1995	1999 →

All 83 seats to Glasgow City Council 42 seats needed for a majority
	First party	Second party	Third party
Party	Labour	Conservative	Liberal Democrats
Last election	54 seats, 46.2%	5 seats, 17.1%	1 seat, 6.4%
Seats won	77	3	1
Seat change	▲23	▼2	Steady
Popular vote	111,587	12,047	6,233
Percentage	61.5%	6.6%	3.4%
	Fourth party	Fifth party
Party	SNP	Scottish Militant Labour
Last election	2 seats, 24.7%	1 seat, 2.3%
Seats won	1	1
Seat change	▼1	Steady
Popular vote	41,453	8,471
Percentage	22.8%	4.7%
- Colours indicate winners in each ward Labour Conservative Liberal Democrat SNP Scottish Militant Labour
Council Leader before election
Labour
Elected Council Leader
Labour

Elections to Glasgow City Council were held on 6 April 1995, the same day as the other Scottish local government elections. The election was the first for the Glasgow City Council; a unitary authority which had been created by the Local Government etc. (Scotland) Act 1994 out of parts of the former City of Glasgow District Council (a district of the wider Strathclyde region for the previous 20 years); wards in Rutherglen and Cambuslang transferred from Glasgow to the new South Lanarkshire area.

== Results ==
1995 Glasgow City Council election result
Party	Seats	Gains	Losses	Net gain/loss	Seats %	Votes %	Votes	+/−
Labour	77			▲23		61.5	111,587	
Conservative	3			▼2		6.6	12,047	
SNP	1			▲1		22.8	41,453	
Scottish Militant Labour	1			▲1		4.6	8,471	
Liberal Democrats	1			Steady		3.4	6,233	
Independent Labour	0				0.0	5.4	574	
Independent	0				0.0	0.3	474	
Communist	0				0.0	0.0	45	
Natural Law	0				0.0	0.0	35	

== Ward results ==
Ward 1: Drumry
Party	Candidate	Votes	%
Labour	M O'Neill	1,021	49.9
Scottish Militant Labour	A Lynch	563	27.5
SNP	J Ruddy	258	12.6
Conservative	M McNeill	121	5.9
Independent	A Morton	48	2.3
Liberal Democrats	A Thompson	37	1.8
Majority		458	22.4
Turnout			34.2
Labour win (new seat)			

Ward 2: Summerhill
Party	Candidate	Votes	%
Labour	M Lee	1,021	49.9
Scottish Militant Labour	A Lynch	515	28.0
SNP	J O'Brien	270	14.7
Conservative	R Hill	26	2.0
Liberal Democrats	C Anderson	32	1.7
Majority		473	21.9
Turnout			31.6
Labour win (new seat)			

Ward 3: Blairdardie
Party	Candidate	Votes	%
Labour	S J Purcell	1,707	69.4
SNP	T Chalmers	475	19.3
Conservative	T Begg	181	7.4
Liberal Democrats	L A Douglas	96	3.9
Majority		1,232	50.1
Turnout			46.3
Labour win (new seat)			

Ward 4: Knightswood Park
Party	Candidate	Votes	%
Labour	C Gordon	1,839	64.8
SNP	I Smith	567	20.0
Independent	E Guthrie	318	11.2
Liberal Democrats	K Philbrick	112	3.9
Majority		1,272	
Turnout			43.6
Labour win (new seat)			

Ward 5: Knightswood South
Party	Candidate	Votes	%
Labour	E A Cameron	1,770	74.1
SNP	R M Rochran	492	20.6
Liberal Democrats	E J Wilson	128	5.4
Majority		1,278	
Turnout			43.0
Labour win (new seat)			

Ward 6: Yoker
Party	Candidate	Votes	%
Labour	C Roberton	1,765	74.9
SNP	P Boggis	507	21.5
Liberal Democrats	D A Mogenduff	86	3.6
Majority		1,258	
Turnout			39.0
Labour win (new seat)			

Ward 7: Anniesland
Party	Candidate	Votes	%
Labour	P A Strain	1,703	64.8
SNP	A MacEachran	507	19.3
Liberal Democrats	S G Hoggar	352	13.4
Scottish Green	N Baker	66	2.5
Majority		1,196	
Turnout			38.6
Labour win (new seat)			

Ward 8: Jordanhill
Party	Candidate	Votes	%
Liberal Democrats	C M Mason	1,347	48.4
Labour	P Ridgway	620	22.3
Conservative	G J Renucci	504	18.1
SNP	D J Caims	313	11.2
Majority		727	
Turnout			47.9
Liberal Democrats win (new seat)			

Ward 9: Kelvindale
Party	Candidate	Votes	%
Conservative	W Aitken	936	36.2
Labour	S Gilmore	858	33.2
Liberal Democrats	J Hook	461	17.8
SNP	B M Quail	284	11.0
Scottish Green	A Whitelaw	47	1.8
Majority		78	
Turnout			40.9
Conservative win (new seat)			

Ward 10: Scotstoun
Party	Candidate	Votes	%
Labour	J McFadden	1,642	66.3
SNP	M T Balfour	503	20.3
Liberal Democrats	R Meikle	169	6.8
Conservative	D H McPhie	161	6.5
Majority		1,139	
Turnout			42.6
Labour win (new seat)			

Ward 11: Victoria Park
Party	Candidate	Votes	%
Labour	H Ritchie	1,470	61.5
SNP	D Macleod	532	22.3
Conservative	M T Smith	222	9.3
Liberal Democrats	C P McGinty	165	6.9
Majority		938	
Turnout			40.5
Labour win (new seat)			

Ward 12: Broomhill
Party	Candidate	Votes	%
Labour	E Fitzgerald	1,356	52.5
SNP	P D Johnson	693	26.9
Conservative	R A P Brocklehurst	308	11.9
Liberal Democrats	P H Marron	224	8.7
Majority		663	
Turnout			40.7
Labour win (new seat)			

Ward 13: Hyndland
Party	Candidate	Votes	%
Labour	R Simpson	955	36.2
Conservative	R N S Logan	877	33.3
Liberal Democrats	C Thompson	446	16.9
SNP	J Brady	291	11.0
Scottish Green			
Majority			
Turnout			
Labour win (new seat)			

Ward 14: Hillhead
Party	Candidate	Votes	%
Labour	P Godman	763	53.1
SNP	L G Hawes	275	20.2
Liberal Democrats	J Money	140	10.3
Conservative	P I Crerar	126	9.3
Scottish Green	J A Taylor	91	6.7
Natural Law	H Fleming	6	0.4
Majority		448	
Turnout			22.0
Labour win (new seat)			

Ward 15: Partick
Party	Candidate	Votes	%
Labour	D Moxham	1,488	56.0
SNP	K McLean	682	25.7
Liberal Democrats	S Simpson	196	7.4
Conservative	L D Jamieson	184	6.9
Scottish Green	C Ballance	106	4.0
Majority		806	
Turnout			37.6
Labour win (new seat)			

Ward 16: Kelvin
Party	Candidate	Votes	%
Labour	J Andrews	1,234	62.3
SNP	G Roberts	396	20.0
Liberal Democrats	S Simpson	196	7.4
Conservative	L Jamieson	184	6.9
Natural Law	D Kras	22	1.1
Majority		838	
Turnout			27.4
Labour win (new seat)			

Ward 17: Firhill
Party	Candidate	Votes	%
Labour	B A Maan	1,122	63.1
SNP	S Bell	468	26.3
Conservative	J Dunnett	96	5.4
Liberal Democrats	E Shepherd	91	5.1
Majority		654	
Turnout			30.0
Labour win (new seat)			

Ward 18: Woodlands
Party	Candidate	Votes	%
Labour	H Malik	1,161	59.6
SNP	A Khan	604	31.0
Conservative	D Mitchell	183	9.4
Majority		557	
Turnout			29.8
Labour win (new seat)			

Ward 19: Kelvingrove
Party	Candidate	Votes	%
Labour	M Green	1,068	71.1
SNP	A Jack	279	18.6
Liberal Democrats	R M Taylor	81	5.4
Conservative	A Smith	75	5.0
Majority		557	
Turnout			29.8
Labour win (new seat)			

Ward 20: Anderston
Party	Candidate	Votes	%
Labour	A Mosson	1,170	75.2
SNP	M M Brown	267	17.2
Conservative	J J Trench	62	4.0
Liberal Democrats	L Clarke	57	3.7
Majority		903	
Turnout			29.7
Labour win (new seat)			

Ward 21: Merchant City
Party	Candidate	Votes	%
Labour	J Moynes	1,404	71.6
SNP	S Creighton-Ross	390	19.9
Conservative	P Wilkinson	98	5.0
Liberal Democrats	S O'Brien	61	3.1
Natural Law	T Leighton	7	0.4
Majority		1,014	
Turnout			32.4
Labour win (new seat)			

Ward 22: Milton
Party	Candidate	Votes	%
Labour	W Harley	1,689	75.8
SNP	D Torrance	539	24.2
Majority		1,150	
Turnout			39.2
Labour win (new seat)			

Ward 23: Possil
Party	Candidate	Votes	%
Labour	A McGarrity	1,714	83.9
SNP	J Byrne	328	16.1
Majority		1,386	
Turnout			38.8
Labour win (new seat)			

Ward 24: Keppoclhill
Party	Candidate	Votes	%
Labour	J Gray	1,090	71.9
Scottish Militant Labour	L A Gracie	240	15.8
SNP	A Juszczak	185	12.2
Majority		850	
Turnout			26.8
Labour win (new seat)			

Ward 25: Summerston
Party	Candidate	Votes	%
Labour	D McNulty	1,412	67.6
SNP	J McEwan	501	24.0
Liberal Democrats	J Alexander	105	5.0
Conservative	W P Rodgers	72	3.4
Majority		911	
Turnout			36.1
Labour win (new seat)			

Ward 26: Maryhill
Party	Candidate	Votes	%
Labour	F Dingwall	1,452	74.2
SNP	I McCartney	389	19.9
Liberal Democrats	E M Arrwooll	117	6.0
Majority		1,063	
Turnout			35.6
Labour win (new seat)			

Ward 27: Wyndford
Party	Candidate	Votes	%
Labour	R Gray	1,065	51.7
Independent Labour	W McAllister	574	27.9
SNP	J Campbell	331	16.1
Conservative	P Miller	91	4.4
Majority		391	
Turnout			37.3
Labour win (new seat)			

Ward 28: Robroyston
Party	Candidate	Votes	%
Labour	R Marshall	1,153	78.5
SNP	C Sreele	255	17.4
Conservative	P Bergin	60	4.1
Majority		898	
Turnout			29.4
Labour win (new seat)			

Ward 29: Gartcraig
Party	Candidate	Votes	%
Labour	F McAveety	1,891	70.2
SNP	J Campbell	544	20.2
Conservative	R Wilson	257	9,5
Majority		1,347	
Turnout			257
Labour win (new seat)			

Ward 30: Carntyne
Party	Candidate	Votes	%
Labour	G McGrath	1,338	69.3
SNP	D Johnston	449	23.3
Conservative	W McLachlan	144	7.5
Majority		889	
Turnout			32.9
Labour win (new seat)			

Ward 31: Royston
Party	Candidate	Votes	%
Labour	P Martin	1,803	83.5
SNP	J Sweeney	355	16.5
Majority		1,448	
Turnout			34.3
Labour win (new seat)			

Ward 32: Milnbank
Party	Candidate	Votes	%
Labour	E McDougall	1,729	70.7
SNP	W Douglas	573	23.4
Conservative	J Welsh	145	5.9
Majority		1,156	
Turnout			38.3
Labour win (new seat)			

Ward 33: Dennistoun
Party	Candidate	Votes	%
Labour	J P Macey	1,205	56.3
SNP	D W Ritchie	833	38.9
Conservative	R Mulholland	102	4.8
Majority		372	
Turnout			38.0
Labour win (new seat)			

Ward 34: Springburn
Party	Candidate	Votes	%
Labour	R Davey	1,868	79.1
SNP	I MacQuarrie	495	20.9
Majority		1,373	
Turnout			39.1
Labour win (new seat)			

Ward 35: Cowlairs
Party	Candidate	Votes	%
Labour	G Macdiarmid	1,235	76.3
SNP	E C Thomson	384	23.7
Majority		851	
Turnout			26.5
Labour win (new seat)			

Ward 36: Wallacewell
Party	Candidate	Votes	%
Labour	M Beckett	1,865	80.2
SNP	A Porter	460	19.8
Majority		1,405	
Turnout			38.6
Labour win (new seat)			

Ward 37: Calton
Party	Candidate	Votes	%
Labour	Y Anderson	1,099	75.5
SNP	A McMilan	284	19.5
Conservative	F M Rose	72	4.9
Majority		815	
Turnout			30.4
Labour win (new seat)			

Ward 38: Bridgeton
Party	Candidate	Votes	%
Labour	E Smith	1,333	84.1
SNP	Nicola Sturgeon	252	15.9
Majority		1,081	
Turnout			28.3
Labour win (new seat)			

Ward 39: Dalmarnock
Party	Candidate	Votes	%
Labour	D Stevenson	1,315	79.5
SNP	T Bruce	340	20.5
Majority		975	
Turnout			32.4
Labour win (new seat)			

Ward 40: Queenslie
Party	Candidate	Votes	%
Labour	G McCann	1,010	48.7
Scottish Militant Labour	C Stevenson	779	37.5
SNP	D I Ritchie	239	11.5
Conservative	S Wilson	48	2.3
Majority		231	
Turnout			38.7
Labour win (new seat)			

Ward 41: Greenfield
Party	Candidate	Votes	%
Labour	W Butler	1,842	75.4
SNP	J Williamson	500	20.5
Conservative	E J Bunting	100	4.1
Majority		1,342	
Turnout			40.5
Labour win (new seat)			

Ward 42: Barlanark
Party	Candidate	Votes	%
Labour	J Coleman	1,294	69.1
SNP	H McAuley	419	22.4
Scottish Militant Labour	A Brown	160	8.5
Majority		875	
Turnout			38.6
Labour win (new seat)			

Ward 43: Tollcross Park
Party	Candidate	Votes	%
Labour	M Adam	1,224	74.2
SNP	P Campbell	425	25.8
Majority		799	
Turnout			31.7
Labour win (new seat)			

Ward 44: Braidfauld
Party	Candidate	Votes	%
Labour	S Baird	1,163	58.6
Scottish Militant Labour	J R Nisbet	483	24.4
SNP	S Hosie	281	14.2
Conservative	M Kilpatrick	56	2.8
Majority		680	
Turnout			38.3
Labour win (new seat)			

Ward 45: Shettleston
Party	Candidate	Votes	%
Labour	G Ryan	1,772	68.0
SNP	J Campbell	833	32.0
Majority		939	
Turnout			42.5
Labour win (new seat)			

Ward 46: Mount Vernon
Party	Candidate	Votes	%
Labour	C C McNicol	1,676	64.3
SNP	S Robison	931	35.7
Majority		745	
Turnout			39.5
Labour win (new seat)			

Ward 47: Garrowhill
Party	Candidate	Votes	%
Labour	C McDonach	1,226	46.9
SNP	G C Cunningham	842	32.2
Conservative	I A Mowat	249	9.5
Scottish Militant Labour	H Morrow	159	6.1
Liberal Democrats	J C MacPherson	138	5.3
Majority		384	
Turnout			43.7
Labour win (new seat)			

Ward 48: Baillieston
Party	Candidate	Votes	%
Labour	D Hay	1,353	48.7
Scottish Militant Labour	J McVicar	968	34.9
SNP	T C McCusker	455	16.4
Majority		385	
Turnout			42.7
Labour win (new seat)			

Ward 49: Garthamlock
Party	Candidate	Votes	%
Labour	D Murphy	1,180	70.2
SNP	J McIntyre	325	19.3
Scottish Militant Labour	J Barrie	175	10.4
Majority		855	
Turnout			35.8
Labour win (new seat)			

Ward 50: Wellhouse
Party	Candidate	Votes	%
Labour	C McMaster	978	54.6
Scottish Militant Labour	C McVicar	559	31.2
SNP	P G Thompson	217	12.1
Conservative	W B Begg	36	2.0
Majority		419	
Turnout			32.1
Labour win (new seat)			

Ward 51: Easterhouse
Party	Candidate	Votes	%
Labour	R Quinn	1,120	69.9
SNP	P Cox	280	17.5
Scottish Militant Labour	S C Rankin	148	9.2
Conservative	J France	55	3.4
Majority		840	
Turnout			29.3
Labour win (new seat)			

Ward 52: Drumoyne
Party	Candidate	Votes	%
Labour	S Doman	1,591	64.4
SNP	B J Goodall	879	35.6
Majority		712	
Turnout			41.6
Labour win (new seat)			

Ward 53: Govan
Party	Candidate	Votes	%
Labour	A Simpson	1,182	54.5
SNP	E M kennedy	579	26.7
Scottish Militant Labour	A Sheridan	362	16.7
Communist	J Foster	45	2.1
Majority		917	
Turnout			35.2
Labour win (new seat)			

Ward 54: Ibrox
Party	Candidate	Votes	%
Labour	D Gaughan	1,432	70.6
SNP	P Donoghue	515	25.4
Conservative	F C Calderwood	81	4.0
Majority		917	
Turnout			35.2
Labour win (new seat)			

Ward 55: Kingston
Party	Candidate	Votes	%
Labour	S Butt	1,079	56.3
SNP	A Noble	652	34.0
Conservative	E N Stewart	187	9.7
Majority		427	
Turnout			37.5
Labour win (new seat)			

Ward 56: Pollokshields East
Party	Candidate	Votes	%
Labour	Chaudhry Mohammad Sarwar	1,539	57.6
SNP	A Hopkirk	626	23.4
Conservative	J Holland	253	9.5
Independent	P J Paton	108	4.0
Liberal Democrats	G C H Lalt	83	3.1
Scottish Green	M A Wright	63	2.4
Majority		913	
Turnout			46.2
Labour win (new seat)			

Ward 57: Maxwell Park
Party	Candidate	Votes	%
Conservative	C E Lyon	785	32.2
Labour	I Chesney	651	26.7
Liberal Democrats	M Asiam	514	21.1
SNP	A Wilson	486	20.0
Majority		134	
Turnout			44.2
Conservative win (new seat)			

Ward 58: Penilee
Party	Candidate	Votes	%
Labour	J Sharkey	2,481	75.5
SNP	J Sweeney	662	20.2
Conservative	J Nixon	142	4.3
Majority		1,819	
Turnout			54.4
Labour win (new seat)			

Ward 59: Craigton
Party	Candidate	Votes	%
Labour	A Watson	2,375	66.5
SNP	D Wilson	993	27.8
Conservative	M J Michie	204	5.7
Majority		1,382	
Turnout			51.2
Labour win (new seat)			

Ward 60: Cardonald
Party	Candidate	Votes	%
Labour	J McCarron	1,494	57.1
SNP	R M Mitchell	803	30.7
Conservative	D Gray	203	7.8
Liberal Democrats	F Wright	115	4.4
Majority		691	
Turnout			48.6
Labour win (new seat)			

Ward 61: Pollok
Party	Candidate	Votes	%
Scottish Militant Labour	T Sheridan	1,019	48.0
Labour	S Petrie	769	36.3
SNP	G W Carradine	333	15.7
Majority		250	
Turnout			41.2
Scottish Militant Labour win (new seat)			

Ward 62: Mosspark
Party	Candidate	Votes	%
SNP	K J Gibson	2,916	76.8
Labour	T A McKenna	793	20.9
Conservative	T Lawrie	89	2.3
Majority		2,123	
Turnout			56.7
SNP win (new seat)			

Ward 63: Crookston
Party	Candidate	Votes	%
Labour	W M Timoney	1,332	51.4
SNP	I Gibson	589	22.3
Scottish Militant Labour	P Donald	577	22.3
Conservative	O Duncan	91	3.5
Majority		743	
Turnout			46.5
Labour win (new seat)			

Ward 64: South Pollok
Party	Candidate	Votes	%
Labour	W O'Rourke	1,162	63.2
Scottish Militant Labour	C L Beaton	427	23.2
SNP	E Tedford	250	13.6
Majority		735	
Turnout			36.5
Labour win (new seat)			

Ward 65: Arden
Party	Candidate	Votes	%
Labour	G J Archer	1,004	64.5
Scottish Militant Labour	M Smith	330	21.2
SNP	R Tedford	222	14.3
Majority		674	
Turnout			36.9
Labour win (new seat)			

Ward 66: Levemholm
Party	Candidate	Votes	%
Labour	J Dodds	938	55.4
SNP	E McBride	437	25.8
Scottish Militant Labour	N Bennett	317	18.7
Majority		501	
Turnout			30.3
Labour win (new seat)			

Ward 67: Carnwadric
Party	Candidate	Votes	%
Labour	C Moore	1,544	66.3
SNP	S Farguharson	786	33.7
Majority		758	
Turnout			30.1
Labour win (new seat)			

Ward 68: Newlands
Party	Candidate	Votes	%
Labour	G Carroll	1,303	46.5
SNP	B Thomas	704	25.1
Conservative	J Docherty	555	19.8
Liberal Democrats	A Begg	240	8.6
Majority		599	
Turnout			45.1
Labour win (new seat)			

Ward 69: Cathcart
Party	Candidate	Votes	%
Conservative	J H Young	1,188	42.4
Labour	E Dinning	1,150	41.0
SNP	A J Kidd	390	13.9
Scottish Green	K Allan	77	2.7
Majority		38	
Turnout			47.1
Conservative win (new seat)			

Ward 70: Pollokshaws
Party	Candidate	Votes	%
Labour	R Gould	1,406	58.4
SNP	I Hunter	586	24.3
Conservative	M Thomas	236	9.8
Liberal Democrats	D M Jago	179	7.4
Majority		820	
Turnout			42.7
Labour win (new seat)			

Ward 71: Strathbungo
Party	Candidate	Votes	%
Labour	W R MacLellan	1,348	60.9
SNP	G S Newlands	533	24.1
Conservative	R Gray	212	9.6
Liberal Democrats	C Dick	121	5.5
Majority		815	
Turnout			36.0
Labour win (new seat)			

Ward 72: Langside
Party	Candidate	Votes	%
Labour	A Graham	1,123	56.7
SNP	J S Manclark	398	20.1
Conservative	I C Thomas	287	14.5
Liberal Democrats	R W Stewart	172	8.7
Majority		725	
Turnout			37.0
Labour win (new seat)			

Ward 73: Hutchesontown
Party	Candidate	Votes	%
Labour	J Mutter	777	50.5
SNP	J M Byrne	443	28.8
Scottish Militant Labour	M Wallace	319	20.7
Majority		334	
Turnout			34.8
Labour win (new seat)			

Ward 74: Oatlands
Party	Candidate	Votes	%
Labour	I Graham	1,538	75.3
SNP	T Reilly	504	24.7
Majority		1,034	
Turnout			35.2
Labour win (new seat)			

Ward 75: Govanhill
Party	Candidate	Votes	%
Labour	C McCafferty	1,592	73.6
SNP	I Samuel	571	26.4
Majority		1,021	
Turnout			33.7
Labour win (new seat)			

Ward 77: Mount Florida
Party	Candidate	Votes	%
Labour	J Lynch	1,366	60.0
SNP	A Bennet	500	21.9
Conservative	A S McInnes	412	18.1
Majority		866	
Turnout			43.2
Labour win (new seat)			

Ward 78: Aikenhead
Party	Candidate	Votes	%
Labour	L Fyfe	1,656	62.9
SNP	M Airlie	520	19.8
Conservative	W J Thomas	456	17.3
Majority		1,136	
Turnout			46.7
Labour win (new seat)			

Ward 79: Carmunnock
Party	Candidate	Votes	%
Labour	E Devine	1,189	68.5
SNP	M L Greene	355	20.4
Conservative	J Wright	193	11.1
Majority		834	
Turnout			34.7
Labour win (new seat)			

Ward 80: Castlemilk
Party	Candidate	Votes	%
Labour	P J Lally	1,687	75.7
SNP	R Shaw	542	24.3
Majority		1,145	
Turnout			41.3
Labour win (new seat)			

Ward 81: Glenwood
Party	Candidate	Votes	%
Labour	M Devine	912	60.8
Scottish Militant Labour	H Birrell	371	24.7
SNP	M Greene	217	14.5
Majority		541	
Turnout			35.7
Labour win (new seat)			

Ward 82: Toryglen
Party	Candidate	Votes	%
Labour	H McKenna	1,595	82.4
SNP	C F Milligan	340	17.6
Majority		1,255	
Turnout			41.3
Labour win (new seat)			

Ward 83: King's Park
Party	Candidate	Votes	%
Labour	J McKenzie	980	61.9
SNP	J M Organ	362	22.9
Conservative	J E F Taylor	240	15.2
Majority		618	
Turnout			43.3
Labour win (new seat)			
