= Electoral history of Nicola Sturgeon =

Elections featuring First Minister of Scotland

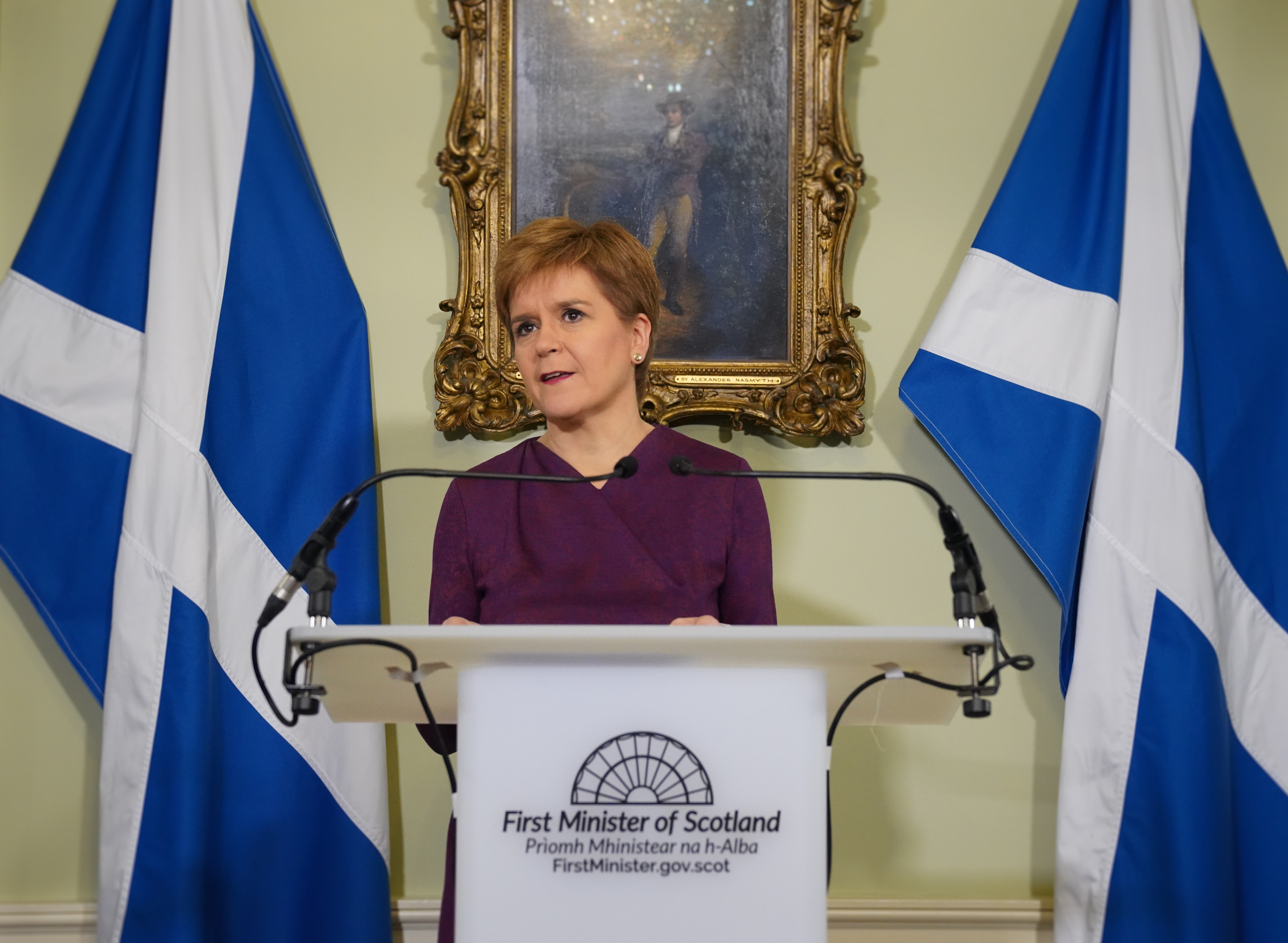
Nicola Sturgeon was the First Minister of Scotland and Leader of the Scottish National Party, the first women to hold either of the positions.

This is a summary of the electoral history of Nicola Sturgeon, the former First Minister of Scotland from 2014 to 2023 and Leader of the Scottish National Party from 2014 and 2023, and Member of the Scottish Parliament for various constituencies since 1999.

== Council elections ==
=== 1992 Cunninghame District Council election, Irvine North ===
Cunninghame District Council Election 1992: Irvine North
Party	Candidate	Votes	%	±%
Labour	J. McKinney	508	59.1	
SNP	Nicola Sturgeon	344	40	

=== 1994 Strathclyde Regional Council election, Baillieston/Mount Vernon ===
Strathclyde Regional Council Election 1994: Baillieston/Mount Vernon
Party	Candidate	Votes	%	±%
Labour	D. Hay	4,908	62.2	
SNP	Nicola Sturgeon	2,140	27.1	
Conservative	J.M. How	840	10.6	

=== 1995 Glasgow City Council election, Bridgeton ===
Glasgow City Council Election 1995: Bridgeton
Party	Candidate	Votes	%	±%
Labour	E. Smith	1,333	84.1	
SNP	Nicola Sturgeon	252	15.9	

== UK Parliamentary elections ==
=== 1992 UK Parliament election ===
General Election 1992: Glasgow Shettleston
Party	Candidate	Votes	%	±%
Labour	David Marshall	21,665	60.6	−3.0
SNP	Nicola Sturgeon	6,831	19.1	+6.4
Conservative	Norman Mortimer	5,396	15.1	+1.8
Liberal Democrats	Joan Orskov	1,881	5.3	−5.1
Majority		14,834	41.5	−8.8
Turnout		35,773	68.9	−1.5
Labour hold		Swing		

=== 1997 UK Parliament election ===
General Election 1997: Glasgow Govan
Party	Candidate	Votes	%	±%
Labour	Mohammad Sarwar	14,216	44.1	+1.0
SNP	Nicola Sturgeon	11,302	35.1	+7.4
Conservative	William Thomas	2,839	8.8	−10.9
Liberal Democrats	Bob Stewart	1,918	5.9	+0.4
Scottish Socialist	Alan McCombes	755	2.3	N/A
Independent	Peter Paton	325	1.0	N/A
Independent	Islam Badar	319	1.0	N/A
Independent	Zahid Abbasi	221	0.7	N/A
Referendum	Kenneth MacDonald	201	0.6	N/A
BNP	James White	149	0.5	N/A
Majority		2,914	9.0	N/A
Turnout		32,245	64.5	N/A
Labour Co-op hold		Swing	N/A	

== Scottish Parliamentary elections ==
=== 1999 Scottish Parliament election ===
==== Constituency results ====
1999 Scottish Parliament election: Glasgow Govan
Party	Candidate	Votes	%	±%
Labour	Gordon Jackson	11,421	43.31	N/A
SNP	Nicola Sturgeon	9,665	36.65	N/A
Conservative	Tasmina Ahmed-Sheikh	2,343	8.88	N/A
Liberal Democrats	Mohammed Aslam Khan	1,479	5.61	N/A
Scottish Socialist	Charlie McCarthy	1,275	4.83	N/A
Majority		1,756	6.66	N/A
Labour win (new seat)				

==== Additional member results ====
1999 Scottish Parliament election: Glasgow
Party	Elected candidates	Seats	+/−	Votes	%	+/−%
Labour		0	N/A	112,588	43.9%	N/A
SNP	Nicola Sturgeon; Dorothy-Grace Elder; Kenneth Gibson; Sandra White	4	N/A	65,360	25.5%	N/A
Conservative	Bill Aitken	1	N/A	20,239	7.9%	N/A
Scottish Socialist	Tommy Sheridan	1	N/A	18,581	7.2%	N/A
Liberal Democrats	Robert Brown	1	N/A	18,473	7.2%	N/A
Green		0	N/A	10,159	4.0%	N/A
Socialist Labour		0	N/A	4,391	1.7%	N/A
ProLife Alliance		0	N/A	2,357	0.9%	N/A
Scottish Unionist Party (modern)		0	N/A	2,283	0.9%	N/A
Communist		0	N/A	521	0.2%	N/A
Humanist		0	N/A	447	0.2%	N/A
Natural Law		0	N/A	419	0.2%	N/A
Socialist (GB)		0	N/A	309	0.1%	N/A
People's Choice		0	N/A	221	0.1%	N/A

=== 2003 Scottish Parliament election ===
==== Constituency results ====
2003 Scottish Parliament election: Glasgow Govan
Party	Candidate	Votes	%	±%
Labour	Gordon Jackson	7,834	37.06	−6.25
SNP	Nicola Sturgeon	6,599	31.22	−5.43
Scottish Socialist	Jimmy Scott	2,369	11.21	+6.38
Conservative	Faisal Butt	1,878	8.89	+0.01
Liberal Democrats	Paul Graham	1,807	8.55	+2.94
Majority		1,235	5.84	−0.82
Turnout		21,136	43.46	−6.06
Labour hold		Swing		

==== Additional member results ====
2003 Scottish Parliament election: Glasgow
Party	Elected candidates	Seats	+/−	Votes	%	+/−%
Labour		0	0	77,540	37.7%	-6.2%
SNP	Nicola Sturgeon; Sandra White	2	−2	34,894	17.1%	-8.4%
Scottish Socialist	Tommy Sheridan; Rosie Kane	2	+1	31,216	15.2%	+8.0%
Conservative	Bill Aitken	1	±0	15,299	7.5%	-0.4%
Liberal Democrats	Robert Brown	1	±0	14,839	7.5%	-0.4%
Green	Patrick Harvie	1	+1	14,570	7.1%	+3.1%
Scottish Senior Citizens		0	0	4,750	2.3%	N/A
Socialist Labour		0	0	3,091	1.5%	-0.2%
ProLife Alliance		0	0	2,477	1.2%	N/A
Scottish Unionist Party (modern)		0	0	2,349	1.1%	+0.2%
BNP		0	0	2,344	1.1%	N/A
Scottish People's		0	0	612	0.3%	N/A
UKIP		0	0	552	0.3%	N/A
Communist		0	0	345	0.2%	–

=== 2007 Scottish Parliament election ===
2007 Scottish Parliament election: Glasgow Govan
Party	Candidate	Votes	%	±%
SNP	Nicola Sturgeon	9,010	41.9	+10.7
Labour	Gordon Jackson	8,266	38.4	+1.3
Liberal Democrats	Chris Young	1,891	8.8	+0.3
Conservative	Martyn McIntyre	1,680	7.8	−1.1
Independent	Asif Nasir	423	2.0	N/A
Communist	Elinor McKenzie	251	1.2	N/A
Majority		744	3.5	
Turnout		22,741	45.4	
Rejected ballots		1,220	5.36	
SNP gain from Labour		Swing	4.7	

=== 2011 Scottish Parliament election ===
2011 Scottish Parliament election: Glasgow Southside
Party	Candidate	Votes	%	±%
SNP	Nicola Sturgeon	12,306	54.4	+14.8
Labour	Stephen Curran	7,957	35.2	−4.6
Conservative	David Meikle	1,733	7.7	0
Liberal Democrats	Kenn Elder	612	2.7	−6.9
Majority		4,349	19.2	
Turnout		22,608	43.1	
SNP win (new seat)				

Scottish Parliament election, 2007 Notional Result: Glasgow Southside
Party	Candidate	Votes	%	±%
Labour		8,543	39.8	
SNP		8,516	39.7	
Liberal Democrats		2,071	9.7	
Conservative		1,650	7.7	
Others		680	3.2	
Majority		27	0.1	
Labour hold		Swing		

=== 2016 Scottish Parliament election ===
2016 Scottish Parliament election: Glasgow Southside
Party	Candidate	Votes	%	±%
SNP	Nicola Sturgeon	15,287	61.4	+7.0
Labour	Fariha Thomas	5,694	22.9	−12.3
Conservative	Graham Hutchison	3,100	12.4	+4.8
Liberal Democrats	Kevin Lewsey	822	3.3	+0.6
Majority		9,593	38.5	
Turnout		24,903	47.8	
SNP hold		Swing	+9.7	

=== 2021 Scottish Parliament election ===
2021 Scottish Parliament election: Glasgow Southside
Party	Candidate	Votes	%	±%
SNP	Nicola Sturgeon	19,735	60.2	−1.2
Labour	Anas Sarwar	10,279	31.3	+8.4
Conservative	Kyle Thornton	1,790	5.5	−6.9
Liberal Democrats	Carole Ford	504	1.5	−1.8
Majority		9,456	28.9	−9.6
Turnout		33,027	59.78	+11.5
SNP hold		Swing	-4.8	

== Party elections ==
=== 2004 Scottish National Party depute leadership election ===
Candidate	Votes	
Candidate	Votes	%
Nicola Sturgeon ✓	3,521	53.9%
Fergus Ewing	1,605	24.6%
Christine Grahame	1,410	21.6%

=== 2014 Scottish National Party leadership election ===
Sturgeon was the only candidate in this election, and was therefore elected unopposed to the position of Leader of the Scottish National Party.

== First Minister Nominating Elections ==
First minister nominative elections
Parliamentary term	Date	Candidates	Votes received
4th Parliament	19 November 2014	Nicola Sturgeon	66
4th Parliament	19 November 2014	Ruth Davidson	15
5th Parliament	17 May 2016	Nicola Sturgeon	63
5th Parliament	17 May 2016	Willie Rennie	5
6th Parliament	18 May 2021	Nicola Sturgeon	64
6th Parliament	18 May 2021	Douglas Ross	31
6th Parliament	18 May 2021	Willie Rennie	4
