= Smith v Glasgow City District Council =

Labour law case in the United Kingdom

- Court: House of Lords
- Citation: [1987] ICR 796, 1987 SC (HL) 175, 1987 SLT 605

Keywords
- Unfair dismissal

Smith v Glasgow City District Council [1987] ICR 796 is a UK labour law case, concerning unfair dismissal on the requirement for an employer to state a main reason for a dismissal.

== Facts ==
Mr Smith claimed his dismissal from the Glasgow City District Council's Building and Works Department, after three complaints, and a majority decision by a special committee that he had to go, was unfair. A letter to him had set out three reasons that (i) he unduly expanded the workforce (ii) he failed to respond to legitimate requests (iii) he was irresponsible in not getting written instructions before spending money on expanding and recruiting.

The Tribunal found the second complaint was unfounded, but the dismissal was fair in any case. The EAT dismissed the appeal. The Inner House of the Court of Session held that the committee wrongly took the second complaint into consideration and so the dismissal had to be unfair. The council appealed.

== Judgment ==
Lord Mackay held the dismissal was unfair. First, the employer failed to show the principal reason for dismissal because it did not distinguish among the three complaints. Second, the employer relied upon the second complaint as part of the principal reason for dismissal. He said that a tribunal cannot impute a reason to the employer's dismissal which it did not have at the time of dismissal.

Lord Keith, Lord Brandon, Lord Ackner and Lord Oliver concurred.
