= 1992 City of Glasgow District Council election =

1992 Scottish local government election

1992 Glasgow District Council election
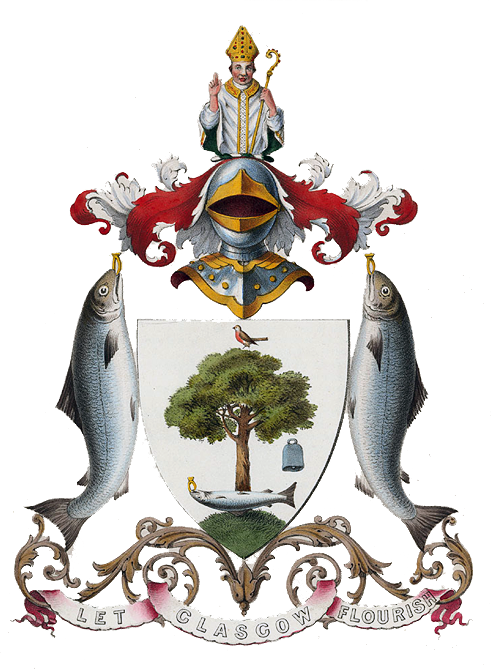
| ← 1988 | 7 May 1992 | 1995 → |

All 66 seats to Glasgow District Council 34 seats needed for a majority
| | First party | Second party | Third party |
|---|---|---|---|
| Party | Labour | Conservative | SNP |
| Last election | 60 seats, 58.0% | 4 seats, 14.3% | 0 seats, 19.6% |
| Seats won | 54 | 5 | 2 |
| Seat change | ▼6 | ▲1 | ▲2 |
| Popular vote | 81,225 | 30,065 | 43,290 |
| Percentage | 46.2% | 17.1% | 24.7% |
| Swing | ▼11.8% | ▲2.8% | ▲5.1% |
| | Fourth party | Fifth party | Sixth party |
| Party | Scottish Militant Labour | Independent Labour | Liberal Democrats |
| Last election | Did not contest | Did not contest | 2 seats, 6.3% |
| Seats won | 2 | 2 | 1 |
| Seat change | ▲2 | ▲2 | ▼1 |
| Popular vote | 4,045 | 3,394 | 11,234 |
| Percentage | 2.3% | 1.9% | 6.4% |
| Swing | New | New | ▲0.1% |
- Map showing results by ward.

Council Leader before election
Labour
Elected Council Leader
Labour

The 1992 City of Glasgow District Council election for the City of Glasgow District Council took place in May 1992, alongside elections to the councils of Scotland's various other districts.

== Results ==
1992 City of Glasgow District Council election result
| Party | Seats | Gains | Losses | Net gain/loss | Seats % | Votes % | Votes | +/− |
|---|---|---|---|---|---|---|---|---|
| Labour | 54 | 2 | 8 | ▼6 | 81.8 | 46.2 | 81,225 | ▼11.8 |
| Conservative | 5 | 2 | 1 | ▲1 | 7.6 | 17.1 | 30,065 | ▲2.8 |
| SNP | 2 | 2 | 0 | ▲2 | 3.0 | 24.7 | 43,290 | ▲5.1 |
| Scottish Militant Labour | 2 | 2 | 0 | ▲2 | 3.0 | 2.3 | 4,045 | New |
| Independent Labour | 2 | 2 | 0 | ▲2 | 3.0 | 1.9 | 3,394 | New |
| Liberal Democrats | 1 | 0 | 1 | ▼1 | 1.5 | 6.4 | 11,234 | ▲0.1 |
| Green | 0 | 0 | 0 | Steady | 0.0 | 1.4 | 2,454 | New |
| Communist | 0 | 0 | 0 | Steady | 0.0 | 0.1 | 180 | New |

== Ward results ==
Ward 59: Toryglen
| Party | Candidate | Votes | % |
|---|---|---|---|
| Labour | S MacQuarrie (incumbent) | 1,707 | 66.4 |
| SNP | J Mulla | 605 | 23.5 |
| Conservative | P McConnell | 257 | 10.0 |
| Majority | | 1102 | 55.9 |
| Turnout | | 1969 | 30.7 |

Ward 60: Rutherglen
| Party | Candidate | Votes | % |
|---|---|---|---|
| Liberal Democrats | Gretel Ross (incumbent) | 2,460 | 57.1 |
| Labour | Margaret Robinson | 1,075 | 24.9 |
| SNP | D Hamilton | 400 | 9.3 |
| Conservative | M McConnell | 372 | 8.6 |
| Majority | | 1385 | 32.2 |
| Turnout | | 4307 | 42.1 |

Ward 64: Fernhill
| Party | Candidate | Votes | % |
|---|---|---|---|
| Labour | M Caldwell | 1,744 | 38.0 |
| Liberal Democrats | M McLellan | 1,640 | 35.8 |
| SNP | A Pollock | 675 | 14.7 |
| Conservative | Jean Miller | 521 | 11.4 |
| Majority | | 104 | 2.2 |
| Turnout | | 4580 | 44.2 |

Ward 65: Cambuslang
| Party | Candidate | Votes | % |
|---|---|---|---|
| Labour | Robert Rooney (incumbent) | 1,520 | 34.1 |
| Liberal Democrats | David S Baillie | 1,178 | 26.4 |
| Conservative | R Muir | 1,042 | 23.4 |
| SNP | G Clark | 634 | 14.2 |
| Green | F B Stevenson | 85 | 1.9 |
| Majority | | 342 | 7.7 |
| Turnout | | 4459 | 40.3 |

Ward 66: Halfway
| Party | Candidate | Votes | % |
|---|---|---|---|
| Labour | David Keirs | 1,920 | 65.1 |
| SNP | Anne Higgins | 521 | 17.7 |
| Conservative | J Dingwall | 261 | 8.8 |
| Liberal Democrats | R Woolfe | 148 | 5.0 |
| Communist | R Ross | 99 | 3.4 |
| Majority | | 1399 | 47.4 |
| Turnout | | 2949 | 34.5 |

== See also ==
- 1995 South Lanarkshire Council election
