= 1984 City of Glasgow District Council election =

1984 Scottish local government election

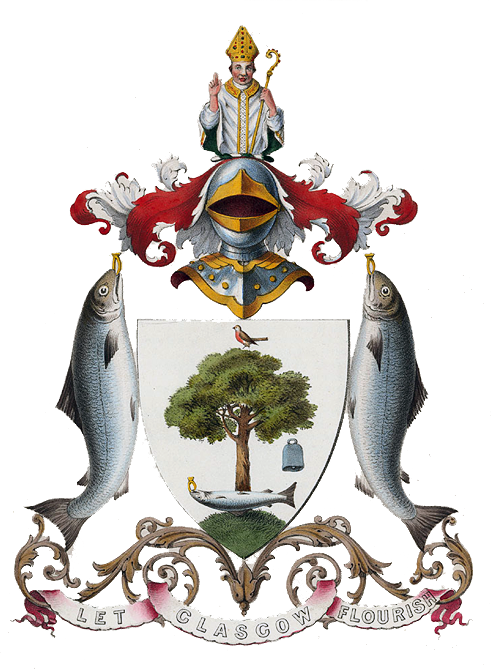
← 1980	3 May 1984	1988 →

All 66 seats to City of Glasgow District Council 34 seats needed for a majority
	First party	Second party	Third party
Party	Labour	Conservative	Alliance
Last election	58 seats, 54.7%	11 seats, 21.9%	3 seats, 5.8%
Seats won	59	5	2
Seat change	▲1	▼6	▼1
Popular vote	141,066	41,946	27,312
Percentage	60.1%	17.9%	11.6%
Swing	▲5.4%	▼4.0%	▲5.8%
- Map showing results in Glasgow District Council wards.
Council Leader before election
Labour
Elected Council Leader
Labour

Elections for the City of Glasgow District Council took place on 3 May 1984 alongside elections to the councils of the other districts in Scotland. The result was victory for the Labour party, who won 59 of the 66 wards.

== Results ==
1984 City of Glasgow District Council election
Party	Seats	Gains	Losses	Net gain/loss	Seats %	Votes %	Votes	+/−
Labour	59	1	0	▲1	89.4	60.1	141,066	▲5.4
Conservative	5	0	6	▼6	7.6	17.9	41,946	▼4.0
Alliance	2	0	1	▼1	3.0	11.6	27,312	▲5.8
SNP	0	0	0	Steady	0.0	9.7	22,641	▼6.2
Independent	0	0	0	Steady	0.0	0.0	116	▼0.2
Other parties	0	0	0	Steady	0.0	0.5	1,170	

== Ward results ==
Ward 59: Toryglen
Party	Candidate	Votes	%
Labour	B Campbell (incumbent)	2,607	68.0
Alliance	Isabella Nelson	528	13.8
Conservative	D McCallum	431	11.2
SNP	D Hamilton	266	6.9
Majority		2079	54.2
Turnout		3832	

Ward 60: Rutherglen
Party	Candidate	Votes	%
Alliance	Gretel Ross (incumbent)	2,544	48.8
Labour	K Ferguson	1,711	22.5
Conservative	Jean Miller	778	14.9
SNP	Williamina Proven	177	3.4
Majority		833	26.3
Turnout		5210	

Ward 64: Fernhill
Party	Candidate	Votes	%
Alliance	Robert Brown (incumbent)	2,618	45.0
Labour	Margaret Robinson	2,564	44.0
Conservative	Anne McCallum	457	7.8
SNP	W Ramsay	190	3.2
Majority		54	1.0
Turnout		5829	

Ward 65: Cambuslang
Party	Candidate	Votes	%
Labour	R McKenzie (incumbent)	2,471	45.2
Conservative	J Hawkins	1,449	26.5
Alliance	J McIntosh	1,202	22.0
SNP	J Smith	341	6.2
Majority		1022	18.7
Turnout		5463	

Ward 66: Halfway
Party	Candidate	Votes	%
Labour	J Cornfield	2,689	75.0
Conservative	Mary M Russell	355	10.0
SNP	J Higgins	268	7.5
Communist	G Massie	155	4.3
Independent	G Clark	116	3.2
Majority		2334	65.0
Turnout		3583	
