= David Hodge (Labour politician) =

Scottish politician (1909–1991)

Lord Provost of Glasgow
- In office 1977–1980
- Preceded by: Peter McCann
- Succeeded by: Michael Kelly

Personal details
- Born: 30 September 1909 Maryhill, Glasgow
- Died: 9 December 1991 (aged 82)
- Party: Scottish Labour Party

Military service
- Battles/wars: Second World War
- Military career
- Allegiance: United Kingdom
- Branch: RAF Coastal Command

David Hodge CBE OStJ DL JP (30 September 1909 – 9 December 1991) was a Scottish politician who was Lord Provost of Glasgow from 1977 to 1980. He was a member of the Scottish Labour Party.

Hodge was born in Glasgow, to David Hodge Sr., an employee at the gasworks, and Sarah Hodge (née Crilly). In his youth he played football for Greenock Morton F.C. before embarking on a career as an insurance agent. In the war he served in RAF Coastal Command.

In 1971, Hodge joined the Glasgow City Council. He later served as chairman of the magistrates committee and then as chairman of the licensing committee in 1974 after a reorganisation of the local government. He served as chairman of Glasgow Constituency Labour Party before becoming Lord Provost of Glasgow from May 1977 to 1980. He was one of the most popular lord provosts and enjoyed a high public profile. He was later credited with helping to lay the foundation for increasing tourism to the city.

Hodge became Lord Provost in the midst of a period of political uncertainty. The 1977 elections for Glasgow District Council saw Labour lose their majority, but they were still the largest party on the council with 30 seats to the Conservatives 25. Labour decided not to try retain power rejecting the possibility of coalition deals with either the Conservatives or the SNP. This seemed to pave the way for the Conservatives to try to form a minority administration, although they also refused to work with the SNP. However Labour did decide to nominate Hodge as a candidate for Lord Provost. When the Council met on 9 May 1977 SNP abstentions meant that Hodge was elected as Lord Provost over the Conservatives Jack Richmond. As the Conservatives had said they would only form an administration if a Conservative held this office, this caused an uncertain situation. Ultimately Richmond urged his colleagues to form an administration nonetheless and they eventually agreed to do this after an internal vote among the Conservative group.

During his term of office he was involved in a memorable April Fools' Day prank, when it was reported that he would be singing in the lead in Scottish Opera's next production of Il Rapolfo. He also unveiled a statue "The Concept of Kentigern".

In 1980, Hodge was appointed a Commander of the Order of the British Empire (CBE) in the New Year Honours and received an honorary degree of Doctor of Laws from the University of Strathclyde.

Hodge, who was Roman Catholic, was an Officer of the Order of St John. He and his wife Mary, who died in 1989, had three children together. David was previously married in 1939 to Dorothy Quinn. They had a daughter in 1940 and Dorothy died in 1941 from colon cancer. So in total, he had four daughters.
