= 1974 City of Glasgow District Council election =

City of Glasgow District Council election

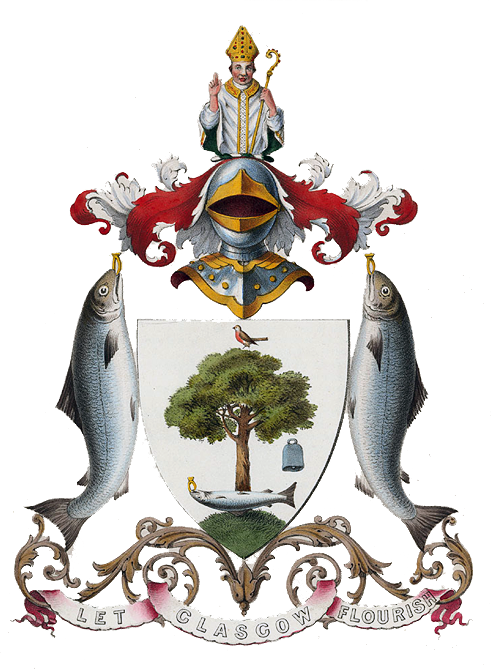
- 4 May 1974

All 72 seats to City of Glasgow District Council 36 seats needed for a majority
	First party	Second party
Party	Labour	Conservative
Seats won	55	17
Popular vote	149,755	90,285
Percentage	47.7%	28.8%
Council control after election
Labour

Elections to City of Glasgow District Council were held on 7 May 1974, on the same day as the other Scottish local government elections. This was the first election to the district council following the implementation of the Local Government (Scotland) Act 1973.

The election used the 72 wards created by the Formation Electoral Arrangements in 1974. Each ward elected one councillor using first-past-the-post voting.

Labour took control of the council after winning a majority. The party took 55 of the 72 seats and almost half of the popular vote. The Conservatives were the second-largest party and won the remaining 17 seats.

== Background ==
Glasgow was made a burgh in 1175. Following the local government reforms in 1890, Glasgow became one of the four Counties of Cities and was administratively separate from the surrounding counties of Dunbartonshire, Lanarkshire and Renfrewshire.

Following the recommendations in the Wheatly Report, the old system of counties and burghs – which had resulted in a mishmash of local government areas in which some small burghs had larger populations but far fewer responsibilities than some large burghs and even counties – was to be replaced by a new system of regional and district councils. The Local Government (Scotland) Act 1973 implemented most of the recommendations in the Wheatly Report. The City of Glasgow District Council – placed within the Strathclyde region – took in a larger area than its predecessor as the burgh of Rutherglen and an area of Lanarkshire including Cambuslang was incorporated into the city.

== Results ==
1974 City of Glasgow District Council election result
Party	Seats	Gains	Losses	Net gain/loss	Seats %	Votes %	Votes	+/−
Labour	55			N/A	76.4	47.7	149,755	N/A
Conservative	17			N/A	23.6	28.8	90,285	N/A
SNP	0			N/A	0.0	19.2	60,198	N/A
Liberal	0			N/A	0.0	2.2	6,786	N/A
Communist	0			N/A	0.0	1.2	3,830	N/A
Independent	0			N/A	0.0	0.4	1,393	N/A
Residents	0			N/A	0.0	0.3	932	N/A
Independent Progressive	0			N/A	0.0	0.2	533	N/A
Scottish Workers Republican Party	0			N/A	0.0	0.0	95	N/A

== Aftermath ==
The City of Glasgow was one of 11 districts in the newly created Strathclyde region that was won by Labour after the party took 55 of the 72 seats. The Conservatives won the remaining 17 seats. Labour also won control of the regional council which held its first election on the same day. Across Scotland, Labour won the most votes, the most seats and the most councils of any party.
