= John Young (Scottish politician) =

Scottish politician (1930–2011)

Member of the Scottish Parliament for West of Scotland (1 of 7 Regional MSPs)
- In office 6 May 1999 – 31 March 2003

Personal details
- Born: 21 December 1930 Glasgow, Scotland
- Died: 3 November 2011 (aged 80)
- Party: Scottish Conservative
- Spouse: Doris (deceased)
- Children: 1

John Henderson Young (21 December 1930 – 3 November 2011) was a Scottish Conservative Party politician. He served as a Member of the Scottish Parliament (MSP) for the West of Scotland region from 1999 to 2003.

== Early life ==
John Henderson Young was born on 21 December 1930 in Glasgow, where he attended Hillhead High School before enrolling in the Scottish College of Commerce. He also studied a management course at Glasgow University.

== Local politics ==
Having originally been elected as a councillor in Glasgow in 1961, Young became leader of Glasgow District Council in 1977, a role he held until 1980.

== Scottish Parliament ==
Young was elected as an MSP for the West of Scotland region in 1999. At the time of his election he was 69, making him the second oldest MSP after Winnie Ewing of the Scottish National Party.

In the Scottish Parliament he was the Conservative group's Deputy Spokesman on Transport and Environment and was a member of the Scottish Parliamentary Corporate Body. He retired at the 2003 election.

== Death ==
John Young died on 3 November 2011, at the age of 80. He was predeceased by his wife, Doris, and survived by one son, Peter.
