= Susan Baird =

British politician (1940–2009)

Susan Baird CBE (26 May 1940 – 24 January 2009) was the Labour Party Councillor for the Braidfauld ward of the City of Glasgow, Scotland. She served as the second female Lord Provost of the city from 1988 to 1992.

She was appointed CBE in the 1991 New Year Honours.

Baird was the recipient of the 1991 St Mungo Prize, awarded to the individual who has done most in the previous three years to improve and promote the city of Glasgow.
