= 1988 City of Glasgow District Council election =

1988 Scottish local government election

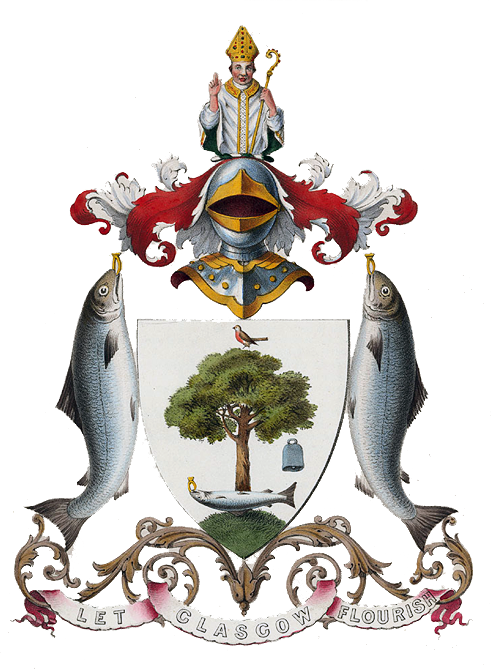
- 5 May 1988

All 66 seats to City of Glasgow District Council 34 seats needed for a majority
	First party	Second party	Third party
Party	Labour	Conservative	SSLD
Last election	59 seats, 60.1%	5 seats, 17.9%	2 seats,11.6%
Seats won	60	4	2
Seat change	▲1	▼1	Steady
Popular vote	141,357	34,757	15,630
Percentage	58.0%	14.3%	6.4%
Swing	▼2.1%	▼4.0%	▼5.3%
- Map showing results in Glasgow District Council wards.
Council Leader before election
Labour
Elected Council Leader
Labour

Elections for the City of Glasgow District Council took place on Thursday 5 May 1988, alongside elections to the councils of Scotland's various other districts.

Labour continued its control of the council whilst the Conservative vote share continued to drop. Voter turnout was 42%, up from 40.3% in the previous election.

== Results ==
1988 City of Glasgow District Council election
Party	Seats	Gains	Losses	Net gain/loss	Seats %	Votes %	Votes	+/−
Labour	60	1	0	▲1	90.9	58.0	141,357	▼2.1
Conservative	4	0	1	▼1	6.1	13.9	34,757	▼4.0
SSLD	2	0	0	Steady	3.0	6.3	15,630	▼5.3
SNP	0	0	0	Steady	0.0	19.6	47,853	▲9.9
Independent	0	0	0	Steady	0.0	1.0	338	▲1.0
Green	0	0	0	Steady	0.0		1,592	
Communist	0	0	0	Steady	0.0		417	
Anti Poll Tax Union	0	0	0	Steady	0.0		271	
Drumchapel Anti Poll Tax Group	0	0	0	Steady	0.0		183	
Independent Labour	0	0	0	Steady	0.0		1,064	
Revolutionary Communist	0	0	0	Steady	0.0		39	
Scottish Republican Socialist	0	0	0	Steady	0.0		159	

== Ward results ==
Ward 59: Toryglen
Party	Candidate	Votes	%
Labour	S MacQuarrie	3,060	76.5
SNP	Lesley Beattie	648	16.2
Conservative	R Gray	291	7.3
Majority		2412	60.3
Turnout		3999	

Ward 60: Rutherglen
Party	Candidate	Votes	%
SLD	Gretel Ross (incumbent)	2,713	48.7
Labour	M Moore	1,755	31.5
Conservative	Jean Miller	648	11.6
SNP	E Young	457	8.2
Majority		1158	20.7
Turnout		5573	

Ward 64: Fernhill
Party	Candidate	Votes	%
SLD	Robert Brown (incumbent)	2,954	45.3
Labour	Margaret Robinson	2,835	43.5
SNP	J Ross	419	6.4
Conservative	J C Gilbert	313	4.8
Majority		119	1.8
Turnout		6521	

Ward 65: Cambuslang
Party	Candidate	Votes	%
Labour	Robert Rooney (incumbent)	2,223	37.4
SLD	David S Baillie	1,573	26.4
Conservative	I Grant	1,163	19.5
SNP	Ellen C McColl	990	16.6
Majority		650	11.0
Turnout		5949	

Ward 66: Halfway
Party	Candidate	Votes	%
Labour	J Cornfield	3,276	75.0
SNP	Anne Higgins	758	17.3
Conservative	Margaret McConnell	336	7.7
Majority		2940	67.3
Turnout		4370	
