= City of Glasgow (1975–1996) =

Local government district in the Strathclyde region of Scotland from 1975 to 1996

Coordinates: 55.86°N 4.26°W

- Glasgow district's wards in 1984
- Population
  - 1994: 681,470
- History
  - Created: 1975
  - Abolished: 1996
  - Succeeded by: Glasgow City Council
- Status: District
- Government: City of Glasgow District Council
  - HQ: Glasgow City Chambers

The City of Glasgow (Scottish Gaelic: Baile Ghlaschu) was a local government district in the Strathclyde region of Scotland from 1975 to 1996.

== Local government ==
As its name suggests, the district (one of 19 overall across the Strathclyde region, which contained more than half of Scotland's population) almost entirely comprised the city of Glasgow that was located within the historic county of Lanarkshire, although for most purposes had operated under its own controlling body, the Glasgow Corporation, since 1893.

In the Local Government (Scotland) Act 1973 leading to its creation, the district's desired composition was described as:

- The county of the city of Glasgow. In the county of Lanark—the burgh of Rutherglen; in the Eighth district, the electoral divisions of Bankhead, Cambuslang Central, Cambuslang North, Hallside, Rutherglen, and those parts of Cambuslang South and Carmunnock electoral divisions lying outwith the designated area of East Kilbride New Town; in the Ninth district, the electoral divisions of Baillieston, Garrowhill, Mount Vernon and Carmyle, Springboig.

This reorganisation thus extended the city boundaries eastwards to include adjacent parts of Lanarkshire, including the historic royal burgh of Rutherglen and its environs plus neighbouring Cambuslang, small towns which had previously resisted the advances of Glasgow into their territory.

The high population of Glasgow, Scotland's largest city, in comparison to other parts of Scotland presented issues for planners. With around 680,000 residents, its district was far bigger than the next-largest (Edinburgh, c. 410,000) which itself was double the population of the third-largest (Aberdeen, c. 210,000). Glasgow was also the capital of the powerful Strathclyde region, with the district offices at Glasgow City Chambers and the Strathclyde Regional Council offices at Nye Bevan House about 1.3 kilometres (0.81 mi) to the west at India Street.

During the two decades of the district's existence, the city successfully emerged from a period of serious economic decline and negative reputation to present itself as a modern city and tourist destination, exemplified by the Glasgow's miles better civic marketing campaign followed by the success of the Glasgow Garden Festival in 1988 and recognition as the European City of Culture in 1990.

The Local Government etc. (Scotland) Act 1994 abolished all of the districts and regions. The City of Glasgow District territory became the Glasgow City unitary council area; the boundaries remained largely the same as the Glasgow District, other than Cambuslang and Rutherglen (four wards) being re-allocated to South Lanarkshire following a local referendum supporting this proposal.

== Election results summary ==
=== 1974 ===
- 72 wards, 1 councillor each, 1974 City of Glasgow District Council election
  - 55 (76.4%) won by Scottish Labour Party from 149,755 overall votes (47.7%)
  - 17 (23.6%) won by Scottish Conservative Party from 90,285 overall votes (28.8%)
  - 0 won by Scottish National Party from 60,198 overall votes (19.2%)
  - 0 won by Scottish Liberal Party from 6,786 overall votes (2.2%)
  - 0 won by other parties from 6,783 overall votes (3.1%)

=== 1977 ===
- 72 wards, 1 councillor each, 1977 City of Glasgow District Council election
  - 30 (▼25, 41.7%) won by Scottish Labour Party from 100,649 overall votes (35.1%) ▼12.6%
  - 25 (▲8, 34.7%) won by Scottish Conservative Party from 82,113 overall votes (28.7%) ▼0.1%
  - 16 (▲16, 22.2%) won by Scottish National Party from 93,695 overall votes (32.7%) ▲13.5%
  - 1 (▲1, 1.4%) won by Scottish Liberal Party from 5,439 overall votes (1.9%) ▼0.3%
  - 0 won by other parties from 5,543 overall votes (2.1%) ▼1.0%

=== 1980 ===
- 72 wards, 1 councillor each, 1980 City of Glasgow District Council election
  - 58 (▲28, 80.6%) won by Scottish Labour Party from 139,471 overall votes (54.7%) ▲19.6%
  - 11 (▼14, 15.3%) won by Scottish Conservative Party from 55,816 overall votes (21.9%)▼6.8%
  - 3 (▲2, 4.2%) won by Scottish Liberal Party from 14,712 overall votes (5.8%) ▲3.9%
  - 0 (▼16) won by Scottish National Party from 40,639 overall votes (15.9%) ▲2.4%
  - 0 won by other parties from 4,192 overall votes (1.6%) ▼0.5%

=== 1984 ===
- Boundary change: 66 wards, 1 councillor each, 1984 City of Glasgow District Council election
  - 59 (89.4%) won by Scottish Labour Party from 141,066 overall votes (60.1%) ▲5.4%
  - 5 (7.6%) won by Scottish Conservative Party from 41,946 overall votes (17.9%) ▼5.4%
  - 1 (3.0%) won by SDP-Liberal Alliance from 27,312 overall votes (11.6%) ▲5.8%
  - 0 won by Scottish National Party from 22,641 overall votes (9.7%) ▼6.2%
  - 0 won by other parties from 1,286 overall votes (0.5%) ▼1.1%

=== 1988 ===
- 66 wards, 1 councillor each, 1988 City of Glasgow District Council election
  - 60 (▲1, 90.9%) won by Scottish Labour Party from 141,357 overall votes (58.0%) ▼2.1%
  - 4 (▼1, 6.1%) won by Scottish Conservative Party from 34,757 overall votes (13.9%) ▼4.0%
  - 2 (▲1, 3.0%) won by Social and Liberal Democrats from 15,630 overall votes (6.3%) ▼5.3%
  - 0 won by Scottish National Party from 47,853 overall votes (19.6%) ▲9.9%
  - 0 won by other parties from 2,668 overall votes (2.3%) ▲1.8%

=== 1992 ===
- 66 wards, 1 councillor each, 1992 City of Glasgow District Council election
  - 54 (▼6, 81.8%) won by Scottish Labour Party from 81,225 overall votes (46.2%) ▼11.8%
  - 5 (▲1, 7.6%) won by Scottish Conservative Party from 30,065 overall votes (17.1%) ▲3.2%
  - 2 (▲2, 3.0%) won by Scottish National Party from 43,290 overall votes (24.7%) ▲5.1%
  - 2 (▲2, 3.0%) won by Scottish Militant Labour from 4,045 overall votes (2.3%) ▲2.3%
  - 2 (▲2, 3.0%) won by Independent Labour Group from 3,394 overall votes (1.9%) ▲1.9%
  - 1 (▼1, 1.5%) won by Scottish Liberal Democrats from 11,234 overall votes (6.4%) ▲0.1%
  - 0 won by other parties from 2,634 overall votes (1.5%) ▲0.8%

== See also ==
- Glasgow (European Parliament constituency)
- Politics of Glasgow
- Subdivisions of Scotland
