= Bashir Maan =

British politician (1926–2019)

Bashir Maan, CBE
- Born: 22 October 1926; Qila Didar Singh, Punjab, British India (now Pakistan)
- Died: 20 December 2019 (aged 93); Glasgow, Scotland, United Kingdom
- Education: MSc
- Children: 4

Bashir Maan CBE (22 October 1926 – 20 December 2019) was a Pakistani-Scottish politician, businessman, judge, community worker and writer. In 1970 he became the first Muslim to be elected to a representative office in the United Kingdom, serving as a Labour Party councillor for the Kingston ward of the City of Glasgow Corporation.

== Early life ==
Bashir Maan was born in Maan village, near Qila Didar Singh, Gujranwala District, British India (now in present-day Pakistan). He completed high school at DB High School, Qila Didar Singh. He was an undergraduate and worked as a clerk in Lahore. As a student, between 1943 and 1947, he was involved in the struggle for independence of the Indian sub-continent and the creation of Pakistan. Following this, he organised the rehabilitation of Muslim refugees from India to his locality. Ultimately, he decided to leave for the United Kingdom.

== Move to Glasgow ==
He arrived in Glasgow from his native Pakistan in March 1953 at the age of 26. Beginning as a student and door to door salesman, in 1967 he went on to open one of the first shops in Glasgow to sell alcohol at heavily discounted prices. He subsequently sold this side of his business concerns due to the conflict that it had with his religious beliefs.

== Civil service ==
In 1968 Bashir Maan was appointed the first Asian and Muslim Justice of the Peace (in Scotland) for the City of Glasgow. In 1970, he was the first Muslim to be elected to a public office in the United Kingdom, serving as a Labour Party councillor for the Kingston ward of the City of Glasgow Corporation. His political career in Glasgow went on to span 33 years. In February 1974 he ran as the Labour candidate for Parliament at East Fife. During this time he also held several judicial appointments such as Magistrate, Police Judge, District Court Judge and Bailie of the City of Glasgow. He retired from politics in 2003 after completing his four-year term as Convenor of the Strathclyde Joint Police Board. He allowed his Labour Party membership to lapse in 2004 when it became clear that the public had been misled by those behind the Iraq war.

== Anti-gay stance ==
Bashir Maan was asked to resign as President of the Scottish Council for Voluntary Organisations in 2006 after deploring the teaching of gay sex education in schools. "These politicians, through certain elements of sex education in schools, are motivating young, innocent children to indulge in premature sex that is resulting in teenage pregnancies. As if that were not enough, gay sex education is being added to the sex curriculum in schools. This will encourage experiments with homosexuality among young children and add to the growing creed of homosexuality."

Bashir Maan spearheaded the campaign by the Council of Glasgow Imams to encourage Muslims not to vote for candidates in Scotland's 2012 local government elections. "Every voter will have to make sure the person they are voting for is not in favour of same-sex marriage. It is up to them who to vote for but they should ask every person who comes to them and asks for their support."

== Advocacy ==
Bashir Maan has played a major role in encouraging the Muslim community's confidence and integration in Scotland especially Glasgow and supporting mutual understanding and respect between communities. In 1966 he became involved in planning and development for what is now the grand central mosque of Glasgow, completed in 1983. He visited Bosnia and Herzegovina with many Scottish Christian leaders and made the plight of the Muslims known to all. He highlighted the positive role of Pakistan Army troops serving as UN peacekeepers there to the world through a series of articles in the press.

== Recognition and honours ==
He has held many prominent positions with both local and national Pakistani organisations, including Founding Chair of the Scottish Pakistani Association and President of the Standing Conference of Pakistani Organisations in the UK and Eire (SCOPO). In 1977, the then Home Secretary appointed him a Deputy Chairman of the Commission for Racial Equality for a three years. In 2000, he was elected the President of the Scottish Council of Voluntary Organisations, a post he held until being asked to resign for anti-gay views in 2006. He has been awarded three honorary degrees of doctorate and two fellowships by Scottish universities. He was Convener of the Muslim Council of Scotland and past President of the Islamic Centre Glasgow.

In recognition of his extensive work in the community, race relations and the voluntary sector, he was presented with the CBE in the Queen's New Year's Honours List in 2000.

Other honours and awards:

2014 – Bediuzaman Said Nursi Lifetime Achievement Award at the Scottish Muslim Achievement Awards. 2013 – Civic Lifetime Achievement Award at the Ethnic Minority Impact Awards, CEMVO Scotland. 2013 – Scottish Family Values Award by The Church of Jesus Christ of Latter-day Saints. 2008 – Award of Excellence Lifetime Achievement by the Al-Khair Foundation. 2007 – Lifetime Achievement Award by the Islam Channel's Global Peace and Unity Event. 2004 – Lifetime Achievement Award at the Azaadi Community Achievement Awards. 2002 – Alija Izetbegovic award for good citizenship in the "Awards for Excellence" organised by The Muslim News. (date unknown) - MCB Award for Lifelong Contribution to the British Muslim Community by the Muslim Council of Britain.

== Publications ==
He contributed to the press and has published three books New Scots, The Thistle and the Crescent and Muslims in Scotland. In The Thistle and the Crescent, Bashir Maan states "East and West or Islam and Christianity are not irreconcilable. Only ignorance, bigotry, injustice and double standards on the West's part and genuine grievances and frustration on the East's part are driving them apart." He further comments, "in the light of the great positive values of the teaching of the Qur'an and the practical successes which resulted from it, the inadequate perceptions of Judaism and Christianity cannot be accounted serious weaknesses, such as to negate all that is sound and true."

== Personal life ==
Bashir Maan had four children, five grandchildren and twelve great-grandchildren. He and most of his family are the subjects of a photographic portrait included in the series 'A Scottish Family Portrait' by Verena Jaekel, commissioned for the Scottish National Portrait Gallery in Edinburgh until 31 October 2012.

== Death ==
Bashir Maan died on 20 December 2019, aged 93.

== Bibliography ==
- The New Scots: The Story of Asians in Scotland, John Donald Publishers, 1992
- The Thistle and the Crescent: a study of Scottish-Islam relations, Argyll Publishing, 21 February 2008
- Muslims in Scotland, Argyll Publishing, 2015
