= Bill Aitken (politician) =

Scottish politician (born 1947)

Convener of the Justice Committee
- In office 14 May 2007 – 21 February 2011
- Preceded by: Pauline McNeill
- Succeeded by: John Lamont

Member of the Scottish Parliament for Glasgow (1 of 7 Regional MSPs)
- In office 6 May 1999 – 22 March 2011

Personal details
- Born: William Mackie Aitken; 15 April 1947 (age 78) Glasgow, Scotland
- Party: Conservative
- Profession: insurance, legislator

William Mackie Aitken (born 15 April 1947) is a Scottish Conservative politician. He was a Member of the Scottish Parliament (MSP) for Glasgow from 1999 to 2011, Scottish Conservative Spokesperson for Justice, and Convener of the Justice Committee from 2007 to 2011.

== Background, education and career ==
Aitken was born in Glasgow, and educated at Allan Glen's School in the city and Glasgow College of Technology (now Glasgow Caledonian University). He worked in the Financial Services/Insurance Industry for 34 years (1965–1999). He is a supporter of Partick Thistle Football Club. His interests include sports, reading and foreign travel.

Following involvement in youth politics he was elected a Glasgow City Councillor in 1977 for the Anniesland ward, subsequently becoming the Convener of the Licensing Committee and Vice Convener of the Personnel Committee. He served as Leader of the Opposition for two terms prior to becoming MSP for Glasgow in 1999. He was a District Court Judge (1985–2000), and is also a Justice of the Peace and a Deputy Lord Lieutenant of the Glasgow City Council (1993–present).

Following his election to the Scottish Parliament, he became Conservative Party Spokesman on Housing and Justice prior to becoming Chief Whip in 2003. He then became Scottish Shadow Cabinet Secretary for Justice and also the Convener of the Parliament's Justice Committee. He was a trustee of the Scottish Parliamentary Contributory Pension Fund.

On 19 May 2010, it was announced that he would step down at the next Holyrood election, to be held on 5 May 2011.

In February 2011 he caused controversy when he suggested that a woman who was recently gang raped in Glasgow may have been a prostitute, as the victim claimed that she was dragged from one side of the city centre to another, a location known for prostitution. On 21 February 2011 he resigned as Convenor of the Scottish Parliament justice committee in response to this controversy.
