= Glasgow Southside =

Region or constituency of the Scottish Parliament

- Burgh constituency for the Scottish Parliament
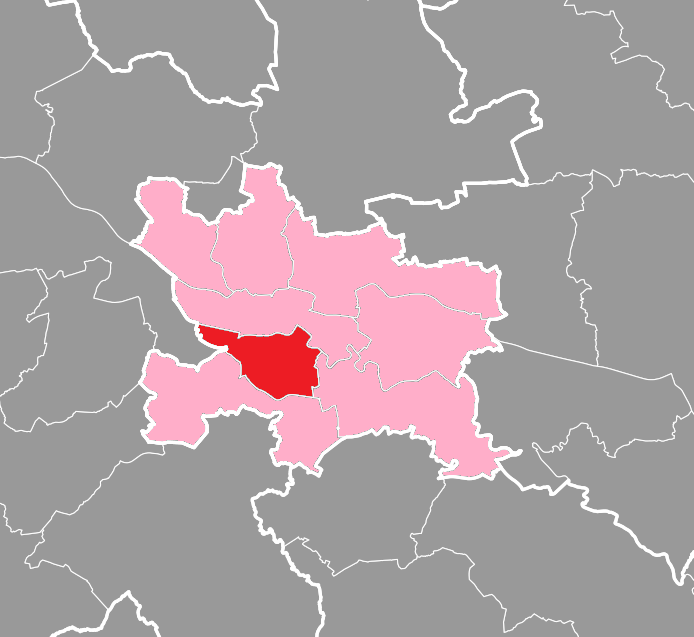

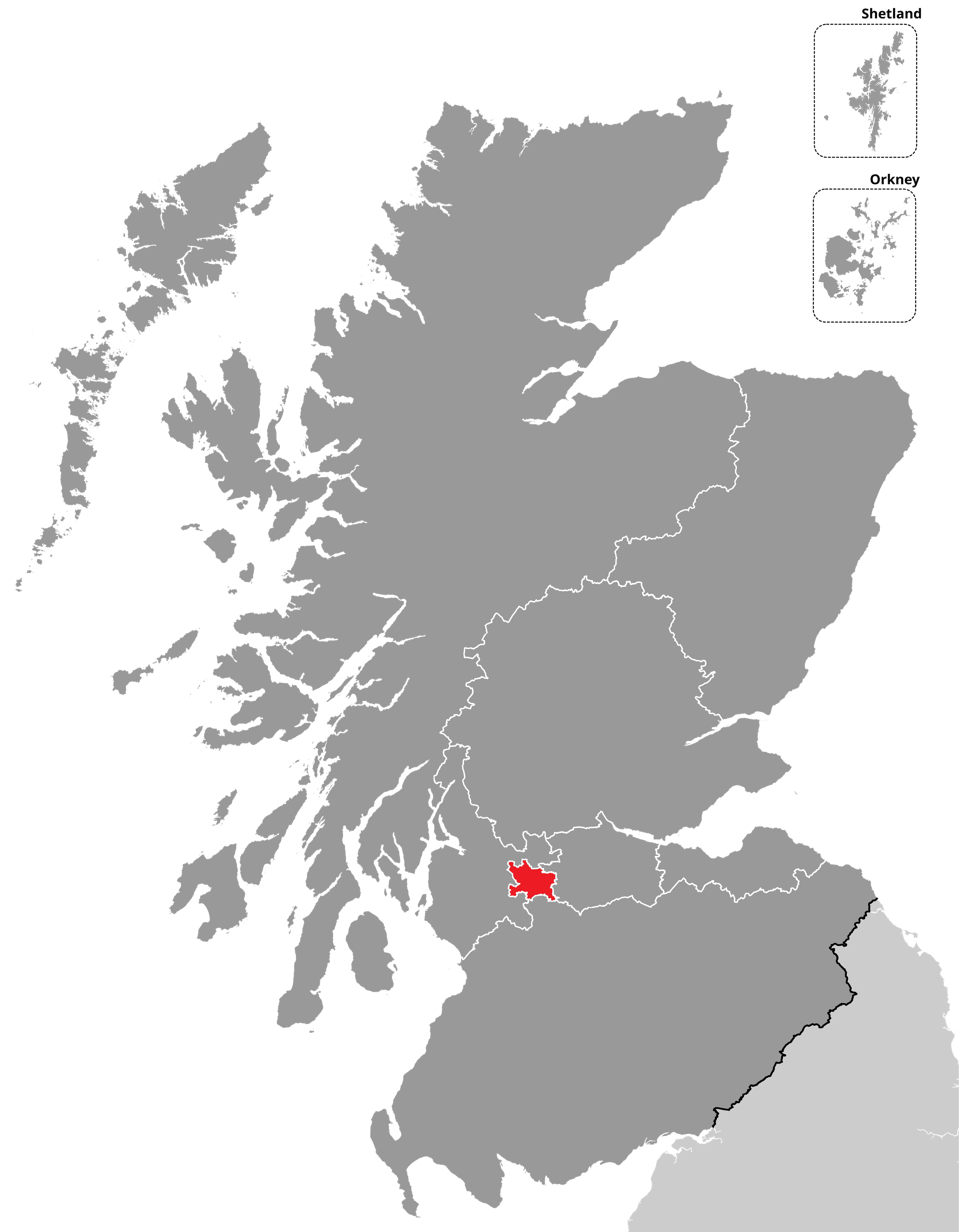
- Glasgow Southside shown within the Glasgow electoral region and the region shown within Scotland
- Electoral region: Glasgow
- Electorate: 66,001 (2026)

Current constituency
- Created: 2011
- Party: Scottish Greens
- MSP: Holly Bruce
- Council area: Glasgow City

Glasgow Southside is a burgh constituency of the Scottish Parliament, being one of eight constituencies within the Glasgow City council area. It elects one Member of the Scottish Parliament (MSP) by the plurality (first past the post) method of election. Under the additional-member electoral system used for elections to the Scottish Parliament, it is also one of eight constituencies in the Glasgow electoral region, which elects seven additional members, in addition to the eight constituency MSPs, to produce a form of proportional representation for the region as a whole.

The seat was held by Nicola Sturgeon, First Minister of Scotland from 2014 to 2023, for the Scottish National Party (SNP). She held it from the time that the seat was created for 2011 Scottish Parliament election, until standing down as an MSP in 2026. The SNP were unable to hold the seat at the 2026 Scottish Parliament election, when it was won by Holly Bruce of the Scottish Greens.

== Electoral region ==
The other seven constituencies of the Glasgow region are Glasgow Anniesland, Glasgow Baillieston and Shettleston, Glasgow Cathcart and Pollok, Glasgow Central, Glasgow Easterhouse and Springburn, Glasgow Kelvin and Maryhill, and Rutherglen and Cambuslang. The region covers most of the Glasgow City council area, and a north-western portion of the South Lanarkshire council area.

Prior to the second periodic review of Scottish Parliament boundaries in 2025, the other eight constituencies of the Glasgow region were Glasgow Anniesland, Glasgow Cathcart, Glasgow Kelvin, Glasgow Maryhill and Springburn, Glasgow Pollok, Glasgow Provan, Glasgow Shettleston, and Rutherglen. The region covered the Glasgow City council area and a north-western portion of the South Lanarkshire council area.

== Constituency boundaries and council areas ==
Map of boundaries (2011-2026)

The constituency was created following the first periodic review of Scottish Parliament boundaries, and was first contested at the 2011 Scottish Parliament election. The electoral wards used to define the seat were:

- In full: Southside Central, Pollokshields
- In part: Govan (shared with Pollok)

At the second periodic review of Scottish Parliament boundaries changes were recommended by Boundaries Scotland, with the new boundaries set to be used for the 2026 Scottish Parliament election. The electoral wards used to define the Glasgow Southside at this review were:

- Pollokshields (entire ward)
- Langside (entire ward)
- Southside Central (shared with Glasgow Central)

== Constituency profile ==
The constituency has attracted a high amount of media interest over the years due to its status as the constituency of the former First Minister. A profile in The Scotsman described it as, "one of Scotland’s most diverse constituencies. It takes in the gated mansions of Pollokshields as well as Ibrox and Govan, which once teemed with shipyard workers. It takes in Strathbungo, with its Greek Thomson terraces as well as the Gorbals, a former melting pot of Irish, Italian and Jewish immigration."

Problems with slum landlords and other vermin, and refuse collections have been highlighted as particular issues in the area. During the 2021 Scottish Parliament election, Glasgow City Council were accused of dispatching cleaners to the constituency to spruce it up prior to press events in the area.

== Member of the Scottish Parliament ==
The former First Minister, Nicola Sturgeon, represented the constituency from its creation in the 2011 election, until stepping down from Holyrood in 2026. She was previously an MSP for the Glasgow regional list from 1999 to 2007, and Glasgow Govan between 2007 and 2011 until the abolition of that constituency.

Holly Bruce of the Scottish Greens gained the seat from the SNP at the 2026 Scottish Parliament election, becoming the first Green MSP to win a constituency seat in Glasgow.

Election	Member	Party
2011	Nicola Sturgeon	Scottish National Party
2026	Holly Bruce	Scottish Greens

== Elections ==
=== 2020s ===
2026 Scottish Parliament election: Glasgow Southside (Note: Note that changes in vote share are shown with respect to the notional result of the 2021 election, calculated to account for boundary changes)
Party	Candidate	Constituency			Regional		
Party	Candidate	Votes	%	±%	Votes	%	±%
Green	Holly Bruce	14,048	36.5	New	14,121	36.6	▲15.4
SNP	Kaukab Stewart (Note: Incumbent member on the party list, or for another constituency)	10,947	28.4	▼32.5	9,763	25.3	▼14.9
Labour	Rashid Hussain	7,300	19.0	▼9.0	6,631	17.2	▼4.5
Reform	Gordon Millar	3,019	7.8	New	2,931	7.6	▲7.5
Conservative	Ross Hutton	1,383	3.6	▼4.2	1,551	4	▼5.4
Liberal Democrats	Rachel Park	1,143	3.0	▲0.9	1,367	3.5	▲1.8
Independent Green Voice					424	1.1	
AtLS					336	0.9	
Scottish Socialist					304	0.8	
Scottish Family					241	0.6	
Scottish Common Party	Kamran Butt	512	1.3	New	312	0.8	
Independent	Craig Houston				169	0.4	
Workers Party					153	0.4	
Independent	Arzoo Abdullah	147	0.4	New			
ISP					125	0.3	
Scottish Christian					82	0.2	
UKIP					17	0.0	
Independent	Elspeth Kerr				40	0.1	
Majority		3,101	8.1				
Valid votes		38,499			38,567		
Invalid votes		172			106		
Turnout		38,671	58.6	▼1.2	38,673	58.6	
Green gain from SNP		Swing					
Notes

2021 Scottish Parliament election: Glasgow Southside
Party	Candidate	Constituency			Regional		
Party	Candidate	Votes	%	±%	Votes	%	±%
SNP	Nicola Sturgeon (Note: Incumbent member for this constituency)	19,735	60.2	▼1.2	13,661	41.6	▼3.7
Labour Co-op	Anas Sarwar (Note: Sarwar stood on a joint ticket on behalf of Scottish Labour and the Scottish Co-operative Party. The regional list vote is for Scottish Labour only.) (Note: Incumbent member on the party list, or for another constituency)	10,279	31.3	▲8.4	7,729	23.5	▲3.6
Green					6,063	18.4	▲4.8
Conservative	Kyle Thornton	1,790	5.5	▼6.9	2,901	8.8	▼2.8
Alba					636	1.9	New
Liberal Democrats	Carole Ford	504	1.5	▼1.8	575	1.7	▼0.3
Independent Green Voice					295	0.9	New
All for Unity					223	0.7	New
Scottish Family					161	0.5	New
No label	Greg Energy Adviser	147	0.4	New			
Liberal	Derek Jackson	102	0.3	New			
Freedom Alliance (UK)	Carol Dobson	204	0.6	New	99	0.3	New
TUSC					95	0.3	New
Women's Equality					88	0.3	▼0.6
Communist					81	0.3	New
Scottish Libertarian					52	0.2	New
Abolish the Scottish Parliament					51	0.2	New
UKIP					48	0.2	▼1.5
Independent	Jayda Fransen	46	0.1	New			
SDP					32	0.1	New
Reform					31	0.1	New
Independent	Craig Ross				19	0.1	New
Reclaim					16	0.1	New
Renew					10	0.0	New
Independent	Daniel Donaldson				10	0.0	New
Majority		9,456	28.9	▼9.6			
Valid votes		32,807			32,876		
Invalid votes		220			113		
Turnout		33,027	59.78	▲11.5	32,989	59.71	▲11.3
SNP hold		Swing		▼4.8			

=== 2010s ===
2016 Scottish Parliament election: Glasgow Southside
Party	Candidate	Constituency			Regional		
Party	Candidate	Votes	%	±%	Votes	%	±%
SNP	Nicola Sturgeon (Note: Incumbent member for this constituency)	15,287	61.4	▲7.0	11,393	45.3	▲3.2
Labour	Fariha Thomas	5,694	22.9	▼12.3	5,002	19.9	▼9.4
Green					3,444	13.7	▲5.8
Conservative	Graham Hutchison	3,100	12.4	▲4.7	2,935	11.7	▲5.0
Liberal Democrats	Kevin Lewsey	822	3.3	▲0.6	516	2.1	▼0.1
UKIP					420	1.7	▲1.2
RISE					387	1.5	New
Solidarity					335	1.3	New
Women's Equality					209	0.8	New
BUP					190	0.8	New
Animal Welfare					172	0.7	New
Scottish Christian					136	0.5	0.0
Independent	Andrew McCullagh				15	0.1	New
Majority		9,593	38.5	▲19.3			
Valid votes		24,903			25,154		
Invalid votes		279			68		
Turnout		25,182	48.3	▲4.7	25,222	48.4	▲4.8
SNP hold		Swing		▲9.7			
Notes

2011 Scottish Parliament election: Glasgow Southside
Party	Candidate	Constituency			Regional		
Party	Candidate	Votes	%	±%	Votes	%	±%
SNP	Nicola Sturgeon (Note: Incumbent member for the Glasgow Govan constituency)	12,306	54.4	N/A	9,548	42.1	N/A
Labour	Stephen Curran	7,957	35.2	N/A	6,648	29.3	N/A
Green					1,779	7.8	N/A
Conservative	David Meikle	1,733	7.7	N/A	1,518	6.7	N/A
Respect					1,359	6.0	N/A
Liberal Democrats	Kenn Elder	612	2.7	N/A	497	2.2	N/A
All-Scotland Pensioners Party					319	1.4	N/A
BNP					261	1.2	N/A
Socialist Labour					200	0.9	N/A
Scottish Socialist					149	0.7	N/A
Scottish Christian					119	0.5	N/A
UKIP					114	0.5	N/A
Pirate					68	0.3	N/A
Scottish Unionist					68	0.3	N/A
Independent	Caroline Johnstone				17	0.1	N/A
Scottish Homeland Party					16	0.1	N/A
Majority		4,349	19.2	N/A			
Valid votes		22,608			22,680		
Invalid votes		203			147		
Turnout		22,811	43.6	N/A	22,827	43.6	N/A
SNP win (new seat)							

== See also ==
- Politics of Glasgow
- Glasgow South (UK Parliament constituency)

Preceded by Aberdeenshire East	Constituency represented by the First Minister; 2014 – 2023	Succeeded by Glasgow Pollok
Preceded by Glasgow Govan	Constituency represented by the Deputy First Minister of Scotland; 2011–2014	Succeeded by Perthshire North
