= 2022 Glasgow City Council election =

Glasgow City Council election

- 5 May 2022

All 85 seats to Glasgow City Council 43 seats needed for a majority
- Registered: 464,091
- Turnout: 38.4%
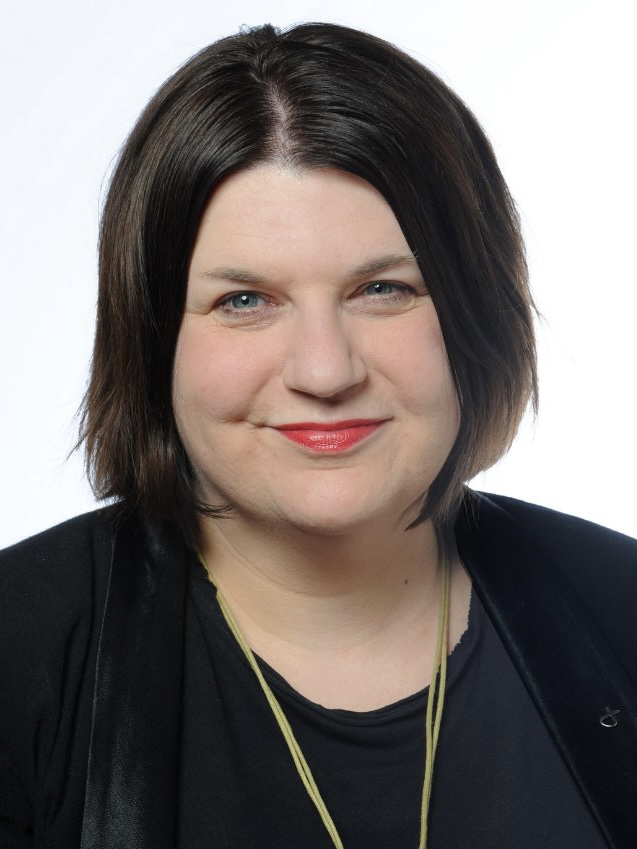

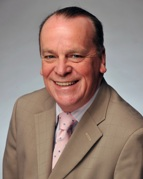

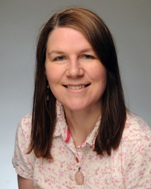

	First party	Second party
Leader	Susan Aitken	Malcolm Cunning
Party	SNP	Labour
Leader's seat	Langside	Linn
Last election	39 seats, 41.0%	31 seats, 30.2%
Seats before	35	29
Seats won	37	36
Seat change	▼2	▲5
Popular vote	61,543	58,516
Percentage	35.5%	33.8%
Swing	▼5.5%	▲3.6%
	Third party	Fourth party
Leader	Jon Molyneux & Martha Wardrop	Thomas Kerr
Party	Green	Conservative
Leader's seat	Pollokshields & Hillhead	Shettleston
Last election	7 seats, 8.7%	8 seats, 14.6%
Seats before	6	7
Seats won	10	2
Seat change	▲3	▼6
Popular vote	23,716	17,741
Percentage	13.7%	10.2%
Swing	▲5.0%	▼4.4%
- The 23 new multi-member wards

Leader before election
Susan Aitken
(SNP)
No overall control
Leader after election
Susan Aitken (SNP)
No overall control

Elections to Glasgow City Council took place on 5 May 2022 on the same day as the 31 other Scottish local government elections. As with other Scottish council elections, it was held using single transferable vote (STV) – a form of proportional representation – in which multiple candidates are elected in each ward and voters rank candidates in order of preference.

Despite losing two seats, the Scottish National Party (SNP) were returned as the largest party on the council for the second consecutive election, returning 37 councillors out of 85 – six shy of an overall majority. Labour regained some of the ground they had lost at the previous election after winning 36 seats – up five from 2017. The Greens bettered their record-breaking performance from 2017 as they won 10 seats – an increase of three – while the Conservatives lost three-quarters of their seats as they returned just two councillors.

Following the election, the SNP and Greens reached a "working agreement" which allowed the minority SNP administration to remain in control and Cllr Susan Aitken was again returned as council leader.

== Background ==
=== Previous election ===
At the previous election in 2017, the Scottish National Party (SNP) won the most seats on the council for the first time. The SNP gained 12 seats to hold 39, four shy of an overall majority, while Labour lost 13 seats, which left them with 31 as they fell from the largest party to second place. The Conservatives gained seven seats to record their best result in Glasgow since 1980 with eight seats. The Greens had a similarly record-breaking result as they recorded their best ever result in Glasgow picking up seven seats, two more than 2012. The Liberal Democrats lost their only seat. As a result, the SNP formed a minority administration to run the council.

2017 Glasgow City Council election result
Party	Seats	Vote share
SNP	39	41.0%
Labour	31	30.2%
Conservatives	8	14.6%
Greens	7	8.7%

=== Electoral system ===
The election used the 23 wards created following the fifth statutory review of electoral arrangements conducted by Local Government Boundary Commission for Scotland in 2016, with 85 councillors elected. Each ward elected either three or four councillors, using the single transferable vote (STV) electoral system – a form of proportional representation – where candidates are ranked in order of preference.

=== Composition ===
Following the 2017 election, several changes in the composition of the council occurred. Most were changes to the political affiliation of councillors including SNP councillors Glenn Elder, Russell Robertson, Michael Cullen and Elspeth Kerr and Green councillor Martin Bartos who resigned from their respective parties to become independents. Labour councillor Anne McTaggart defected and joined the SNP and Conservative councillor Tony Curtis resigned from the party before he was disqualified from the council for not attending a meeting in six months. Labour councillor Jim Coleman was also disqualified for not attending a meeting in six months.

SNP councillors Michelle Ferns and John Letford defected to the Alba Party. Three by-elections were held and resulted in a Labour hold, a Labour gain from Conservative and an SNP gain from Labour. Labour councillor Gary Gray died in February 2022 which left a vacancy on the council which would not be filled as it was less than six months before the election.

Composition of Glasgow City Council
Party	2017 election	Dissolution
SNP	39	35
Labour	31	29
Conservative	8	7
Green	7	6
Independent	0	5
Alba	0	2

Notes

1. Note 1: A vacancy created less than six months before the election was not filled so there were only 84 councillors prior to the poll.

=== Retiring Councillors ===
Retiring councillors
Council Ward	Party	Retiring Councillor
Linn	Independent	Glenn Elder
Newlands/Auldburn	SNP	Josephine Docherty
Newlands/Auldburn	Conservative	Kyle Thornton
Greater Pollok	SNP	David McDonald
Greater Pollok	SNP	Rhiannon Spear
Govan	Labour	John Kane
Govan	Green	Allan Young
Langside	Labour	Archie Graham
Langside	SNP	Anna Richardson
Langside	Green	Tanya Wisely
Calton	SNP	Jennifer Layden
Victoria Park	Labour	Maggie McTernan
Garscadden/Scotstounhill	Independent	Michael Cullen
Drumchapel/Anniesland	SNP	Malcolm Balfour
Maryhill	Alba	John Letford
Maryhill	Labour	Jane Morgan
Springburn/Robroyston	Labour	Martin McElroy
East Centre	Labour	Frank Docherty
East Centre	Labour	Marie Garrity
East Centre	Independent	Russell Robertson
Shettleston	Alba	Michelle Ferns
Baillieston	SNP	Elaine Ballantyne
Baillieston	Conservative	Philip Charles
Dennistoun	Green	Kim Long
Partick East/Kelvindale	Independent	Martin Bartos
Partick East/Kelvindale	Labour	Martin Rhodes

=== Candidates ===
The total number of candidates fell from 209 in 2017 to 201. As was the case five years previous, the SNP fielded the highest number of candidates at 49 (seven less than in 2017) across the 23 wards. Unlike 2017, the SNP were the only party to field enough candidates to win an outright majority as Labour only put forward 42 candidates – one fewer than the previous election. All of the Labour candidates stood under the "Glasgow Labour" banner, an official alternative description registered by the UK Labour Party that its candidates can use on the ballot papers. Both the Greens and the Conservatives also contested every ward with both standing 23 candidates which was the same as the previous election. The 20 candidates fielded by the Liberal Democrats were one less than in 2017 while the number of independent candidates fell from 14 to nine.

As they had in 2017, the Trade Unionist and Socialist Coalition (TUSC) stood seven candidates while the Scottish Socialist Party put forward four candidates – up one from the previous election. The number of United Kingdom Independence Party (UKIP) candidates fell by 90 per cent to one while the Libertarians (two) and the Social Democratic Party (SDP) (one) stood the same number of candidates as they had in 2017. Contesting elections in Glasgow City for the first time were the Alba Party (14 candidates), the Freedom Alliance (three), Volt UK (one) and the Scottish Family Party (one). Solidarity – who had contested every election in Glasgow since 2003 – and No Referendum Maintain Union Pro-Brexit – who had also stood at the 2017 election – did not stand any candidates.

== Results ==
2022 Glasgow City Council election
Party	Seats	Gains	Losses	Net gain/loss	Seats %	Votes %	Votes	+/−
SNP	37	1	3	▼2	43.5	35.5	61,543	▼5.5
Labour	36	5	0	▲5	42.3	33.8	58,516	▲3.6
Green	10	3	0	▲3	11.8	13.7	23,716	▲5.0
Conservative	2	0	6	▼6	2.3	10.2	17,741	▼4.4
Liberal Democrats	0	0	0	Steady	0.0	2.4	4,242	▼0.5
Independent	0	0	0	Steady	0.0	1.8	3,151	▲0.5
Alba	0	0	0	Steady	0.0	1.4	2,440	New
TUSC	0	0	0	Steady	0.0	0.3	573	Steady
Scottish Socialist	0	0	0	Steady	0.0	0.3	519	▲0.2
Volt	0	0	0	Steady	0.0	0.2	421	New
Freedom Alliance	0	0	0	Steady	0.0	0.1	181	New
Scottish Family	0	0	0	Steady	0.0	0.1	91	New
Scottish Libertarian	0	0	0	Steady	0.0	0.0	59	Steady
SDP	0	0	0	Steady	0.0	0.0	50	Steady
UKIP	0	0	0	Steady	0.0	0.0	46	▼0.6
Total	85						173,289	

=== Ward summary ===
Results of the 2022 Glasgow City Council election by ward
Ward	%	Seats	%	Seats	%	Seats	%	Seats	%	Seats	Total
Ward	SNP		Lab		Grn		Con		Others		Total
Linn	33.4	2	32.0	2	6.0	0	11.5	0	17.1	0	4
Newlands/Auldburn	33.1	1	32.8	1	8.4	1	11.3	0	14.3	0	3
Greater Pollok	38.5	2	43.7	2	3.9	0	9.4	0	4.5	0	4
Cardonald	39.2	2	42.0	2	5.4	0	8.8	0	4.6	0	4
Govan	38.3	2	29.7	1	15.1	1	10.0	0	6.9	0	4
Pollokshields	30.6	2	23.4	1	22.1	1	12.5	0	11.4	0	4
Langside	32.3	2	26.7	1	27.9	1	8.6	0	4.4	0	4
Southside Central	34.3	1	31.5	2	18.1	1	4.1	0	12.0	0	4
Calton	39.4	2	34.2	2	12.7	0	10.4	0	3.3	0	4
Anderston/City/Yorkhill	33.0	2	30.1	1	25.8	1	6.7	0	4.4	0	4
Hillhead	28.6	1	22.1	1	36.2	1	6.7	0	6.3	0	3
Victoria Park	26.6	1	28.4	1	23.4	1	15.8	0	5.8	0	3
Garscadden/Scotstounhill	40.7	2	38.7	2	8.3	0	10.3	0	2.0	0	4
Drumchapel/Anniesland	37.9	2	38.2	2	6.1	0	9.5	0	8.3	0	4
Maryhill	42.1	2	34.0	1	12.3	0	8.2	0	3.4	0	3
Canal	38.1	2	35.4	2	5.6	0	5.2	0	15.8	0	4
Springburn/Robroyston	41.2	2	41.7	2	4.2	0	9.0	0	3.7	0	4
East Centre	42.1	2	37.3	2	3.4	0	9.9	0	7.3	0	4
Shettleston	35.4	1	39.2	2	5.0	0	16.7	1	3.6	0	4
Baillieston	38.2	1	38.3	1	4.1	0	16.6	1	2.8	0	3
North East	42.6	1	44.0	2	3.0	0	8.6	0	1.8	0	3
Dennistoun	35.1	1	29.2	1	26.2	1	6.2	0	3.3	0	3
Partick East/Kelvindale	28.4	1	32.2	2	20.9	1	13.3	0	5.2	0	4
Total	35.5	37	33.8	36	13.7	10	10.2	2	6.8	0	85

=== Seats changing hands ===
Below is a list of seats which elected a different party or parties from 2017 in order to highlight the change in political composition of the council from the previous election. The list does not include defeated incumbents who resigned or defected from their party and subsequently failed re-election while the party held the seat.

Seats changing hands
Seat	2017		2022	
Seat	Party	Member	Party	Member
Linn	Conservative	Euan Blockley	Labour	Catherine Vallis
Newlands/Auldburn	Conservative	Kyle Thornton	Greens	Leòdhas Iain Massie
Pollokshields	Conservative	David Meikle	SNP	Zen Ghani
Southside Central	SNP	Mhairi Hunter	Greens	Elaine Gallagher
Calton	Conservative	Robert Connelly	Labour	George Redmond
Victoria Park	Conservative	Ade Aibinu	Greens	Lana Reid-McConnell
Shettleston	SNP	Michelle Ferns	Labour	Jill Pidgeon
North East	SNP	Mandy Morgan	Labour	Sharon Greer
Partick East/Kelvindale	Conservative	Tony Curtis	Labour	Lilith Johnstone

Notes

1. Note 1: In 2017, Michelle Ferns was elected as an SNP candidate but subsequently defected to the Alba Party.
2. Note 2: In 2017, Tony Curtis was elected as a Conservative candidate but later resigned from the party.

== Ward results ==
=== Linn ===
The SNP (2) and Labour (1) retained the seats they had won at the previous election while Labour also gained one seat from the Conservatives.

Linn – 4 seats
Party	Candidate	FPv%	Count								
Party	Candidate	FPv%	1	2	3	4	5	6	7	8	9
Labour	Malcolm Cunning (incumbent)	23.9	2,152								
SNP	Paul McCabe	21.5	1,934								
SNP	Margaret Morgan (incumbent)	11.9	1,070	1,084	1,193	1,222	1,542	1,643	1,985		
Conservative	Euan Blockley (incumbent)	11.5	1,035	1,063	1,063	1,074	1,080	1,199	1,255	1,259	
Independent	James Toner	9.4	849	863	867	893	935	997			
Labour	Catherine Vallis	8.0	724	943	945	952	1,031	1,222	1,421	1,480	1,940
Liberal Democrats	Joe McCauley	6.4	572	606	610	619	691				
Green	Keith Warwick	6.0	544	552	559	577					
Alba	Angela Jones	1.3	114	119	121						
Electorate: 22,308 Valid: 8,994 Spoilt: 200 Quota: 1,799 Turnout: 41.2%

=== Newlands/Auldburn ===
The SNP and Labour retained the seats they had won at the previous election while the Greens gained one seat from the Conservatives.

Newlands/Auldburn – 3 seats
Party	Candidate	FPv%	Count									
Party	Candidate	FPv%	1	2	3	4	5	6	7	8	9	10
SNP	Sean Ferguson	27.4	2,074									
Labour	Stephan Curran (incumbent)	25.5	1,928									
Conservative	Kim Schmulian	11.3	857	858	859	864	868	896	904	986	1,330	
Independent	Craig Ross	9.0	682	686	687	697	713	736	774	868		
Green	Leòdhas Iain Massie	8.4	638	664	665	689	701	741	1,004	1,213	1,369	1,509
Labour	Linda Devlin	7.3	554	563	591	606	627	682	762			
SNP	Rage Rage	5.7	428	555	556	564	618	627				
Liberal Democrats	Hugh Southall	2.3	175	177	178	181	187					
Alba	Ralph Raja Suleman	1.9	147	149	149	157						
TUSC	Jeannie Robertson	1.1	82	84	84							
Electorate: 18,963 Valid: 7,565 Spoilt: 214 Quota: 1,892 Turnout: 41.0%

=== Greater Pollok ===
The SNP (2) and Labour (2) retained the seats they had won at the previous election.

Greater Pollok – 4 seats
Party	Candidate	FPv%	Count									
Party	Candidate	FPv%	1	2	3	4	5	6	7	8	9	10
Labour	Saqib Ahmed (incumbent)	29.3	2,598									
SNP	William Graham	28.1	2,494									
Labour	Rashid Hussain (incumbent)	14.4	1,278	1,957								
SNP	Roza Salih	10.3	917	931	1,486	1,511	1,512	1,519	1,528	1,573	1,597	1,855
Conservative	Matt Ventisei	9.4	833	859	862	883	891	898	920	926	959	983
Green	Chris McFadyen	3.9	349	361	419	431	436	450	477	511	540	
Liberal Democrats	Awais Quershi	1.3	120	130	135	152	157	161	165	172		
Alba	Tahir Jameel	1.0	92	100	117	123	129	131	141			
Scottish Family	Paul Laird	1.0	91	96	106	112	121	130				
TUSC	Eric Stevenson	0.6	51	55	57	64	70					
UKIP	Christopher Ho	0.5	46	53	57	60						
Electorate: 25,241 Valid: 8,869 Spoilt: 269 Quota: 1,774 Turnout: 36.2%

=== Cardonald ===
The SNP (2) and Labour (2) retained the seats they had won at the previous election.

Cardonald – 4 seats
Party	Candidate	FPv%	Count							
Party	Candidate	FPv%	1	2	3	4	5	6	7	8
SNP	Elaine McSporran (incumbent)	29.0	2,489							
Labour	Jim Kavanagh (incumbent)	27.6	2,367							
Labour	Matt Kerr (incumbent)	14.4	1,236	1,275	1,809					
SNP	Alex Wilson (incumbent)	10.2	872	1,476	1,496	1,507	1,532	1,548	1,647	2,007
Conservative	Stephen Paxton	8.8	755	758	776	789	792	836	857	886
Green	Ellie Gomersall	5.4	461	514	522	532	535	581	619	
Alba	Alexander Torrance	2.2	189	211	222	225	226	233		
Liberal Democrats	Ross Chalmers	1.8	153	159	168	182	192			
SDP	Robin Dudfield	0.6	50	53	56	59				
Electorate: 22,574 Valid: 8,572 Spoilt: 242 Quota: 1,715 Turnout: 39.0%

=== Govan ===
The SNP (2), Labour (1) and the Greens (1) retained the seats they had won at the previous election.

Govan – 4 seats
Party	Candidate	FPv%	Count									
Party	Candidate	FPv%	1	2	3	4	5	6	7	8	9	10
Labour	Imran Alam	19.7	1,272	1,281	1,295							
SNP	Richard Bell (incumbent)	18.3	1,181	1,186	1,190	1,190	1,200	1,225	1,394			
Green	Dan Hutchison	15.1	975	1,011	1,025	1,025	1,037	1,057	1,136	1,145	1,187	1,359
SNP	Stephen Dornan (incumbent)	12.3	794	803	808	808	824	846	1,073	1,154	1,188	1,276
Labour	Ruth Hall	10.0	644	651	668	670	705	717	733	736	1,042	
Conservative	Mamun Rashid	10.0	644	645	665	665	671	679	684	685		
SNP	Funmi Fajemiseye	7.7	498	502	503	503	510	533				
Alba	Uche Gladys Emordi	2.0	132	143	147	147	156					
Independent	John Flanagan	1.9	124	128	130	130						
Liberal Democrats	Neil O'Docherty	1.5	97	100								
Scottish Socialist	Bill Bonnar	1.5	95									
Electorate: 20,026 Valid: 6,456 Spoilt: 233 Quota: 1,292 Turnout: 33.4%

=== Pollokshields ===
The SNP, Labour and the Greens retained the seats they had won at the previous election while the SNP also gained a seat from the Conservatives.

Pollokshields – 4 seats
Party	Candidate	FPv%	Count									
Party	Candidate	FPv%	1	2	3	4	5	6	7	8	9	10
Green	Jon Molyneux (incumbent)	22.1	2,290									
SNP	Zen Ghani	16.9	1,755	1,824	1,843	1,864	1,945	2,044	2,097			
Labour	Hanif Raja (incumbent)	16.5	1,709	1,730	1,738	1,798	1,869	1,948	2,541			
SNP	Norman MacLeod (incumbent)	13.6	1,412	1,451	1,462	1,482	1,518	1,596	1,653	1,727	1,746	1,914
Conservative	David Meikle (incumbent)	12.5	1,299	1,301	1,302	1,364	1,372	1,433	1,491	1,570	1,570	
Labour	Fariha Thomas	6.9	712	726	745	797	822	897				
Volt	Ewan Hoyle	4.1	421	451	461	511	528					
Alba	Muhammad Shoaib	3.5	367	368	375	375						
Liberal Democrats	Carole Louise Ford	3.0	309	320	322							
TUSC	Tom Ruddell	0.8	88	101								
Electorate: 21,978 Valid: 10,362 Spoilt: 189 Quota: 2,073 Turnout: 48.0%

=== Langside ===
The SNP (2), Labour (1) and the Greens (1) retained the seats they had won at the previous election.

Langside – 4 seats
Party	Candidate	FPv%	Count								
Party	Candidate	FPv%	1	2	3	4	5	6	7	8	9
Green	Holly Bruce	27.9	3,173								
SNP	Susan Aitken (incumbent)	25.5	2,899								
Labour	Stephen Ignatius Docherty	16.5	1,870	1,978	2,022	2,030	2,058	2,113	2,346		
Labour	Aileen Mary McKenzie (Note: Sitting councillor for Springburn/Robroyston.)	10.2	1,163	1,281	1,297	1,310	1,359	1,457	1,769	1,828	
Conservative	Bruce Whyte	8.6	975	979	982	988	996	1,036			
SNP	Paul Leinster	6.8	775	1,212	1,719	1,767	1,847	1,872	1,884	1,887	2,240
Liberal Democrats	Michael Edward Shields	2.0	225	272	278	286	303				
TUSC	Ronnie Stevenson	1.3	153	224	229	261					
Alba	Chigozie Anne Osuchukwu	1.1	125	136	145						
Electorate: 24,680 Valid: 11,358 Spoilt: 239 Quota: 2,272 Turnout: 47.0%

=== Southside Central ===
Labour retained both of their seats while the SNP retained one of their two seats and the Greens gained a seat from the SNP.

Southside Central – 4 seats
Party	Candidate	FPv%	Count							
Party	Candidate	FPv%	1	2	3	4	5	6	7	8
SNP	Alexander Belic (incumbent)	18.9	1,460	1,462	1,467	1,485	1,491	1,615		
Green	Elaine Gallagher	18.1	1,395	1,405	1,431	1,504	1,522	1,544		
Labour	Soryia Siddique (incumbent)	16.5	1,271	1,274	1,288	1,299	1,341	1,513	1,518	1,743
SNP	Mhairi Hunter (incumbent)	15.4	1,185	1,188	1,193	1,201	1,204	1,237	1,289	
Labour	James Scanlon (incumbent)	15.0	1,161	1,164	1,183	1,196	1,298	1,338	1,342	1,594
Alba	Kamran Butt	8.1	623	624	628	638	664			
Conservative	Tariq Parvez	4.1	317	317	329	330				
Scottish Socialist	Paul Robert Donnelly	2.0	154	160	161					
Liberal Democrats	Sam Glasgow-Jackson	1.4	110	112						
Independent	Jamie Dyer	0.5	41							
Electorate: 20,537 Valid: 7,717 Spoilt: 296 Quota: 1,544 Turnout: 39.0%

=== Calton ===
The SNP (2) and Labour (1) retained the seats they had won at the previous election while Labour gained one seat from the Conservatives.

Calton – 4 seats
Party	Candidate	FPv%	Count								
Party	Candidate	FPv%	1	2	3	4	5	6	7	8	9
SNP	Greg Hepburn (incumbent)	24.2	1,472								
Labour	George Redmond	17.1	1,039	1,045	1,057	1,065	1,080	1,247			
Labour	Cecilia O'Lone (incumbent)	17.1	1,037	1,056	1,071	1,096	1,112	1,341			
Green	Kate Samuels	12.7	772	786	799	814	866	914	941	946	
Conservative	Robert Connelly (incumbent)	10.4	634	636	647	653	659				
SNP	Linda Pike	9.1	551	714	724	751	1,054	1,069	1,085	1,087	1,676
SNP	Olu Shokunbi	6.1	368	397	402	416					
Alba	Catherine McKernan	2.0	120	129	136						
Liberal Democrats	Alexander Palmer	1.3	79	81							
Electorate: 19,673 Valid: 6,072 Spoilt: 202 Quota: 1,215 Turnout: 31.9%

=== Anderston/City/Yorkhill ===
The SNP (2), Labour (1) and the Greens (1) retained the seats they won at the previous election.

Anderston/City/Yorkhill – 4 seats
Party	Candidate	FPv%	Count									
Party	Candidate	FPv%	1	2	3	4	5	6	7	8	9	10
Green	Christy Mearns (incumbent)	25.8	1,527									
Labour	Philip Braat (incumbent)	24.4	1,439									
SNP	Eva Bolander (incumbent)	22.8	1,349									
SNP	Angus Millar (incumbent)	10.2	603	783	801	938	940	947	974	992	1,016	1,236
Conservative	Susan McCourt	6.7	395	399	408	410	418	422	431	463		
Labour	John Gerard Carson	5.7	337	401	597	606	610	616	629	712	900	
Liberal Democrats	Matthew James Clark	2.5	145	168	175	178	184	187	198			
Independent	Benn Rapson	0.8	48	64	64	65	69	83				
Independent	Carla Arrighi	0.6	36	39	39	41	45					
Scottish Libertarian	Nick Thomson	0.5	31	33	33	33						
Electorate: 21,667 Valid: 5,910 Spoilt: 180 Quota: 1,183 Turnout: 28.1%

=== Hillhead ===
The Greens, the SNP and Labour retained the seats they had won at the previous election.

Hillhead – 3 seats
Party	Candidate	FPv%	Count	
Party	Candidate	FPv%	1	2
Green	Martha Wardrop (incumbent)	36.2	2,507	
SNP	Ken Andrew (incumbent)	28.7	1,984	
Labour	Hanzala Malik (incumbent)	22.1	1,532	1,914
Conservative	Mark Russell	6.7	464	477
Liberal Democrats	Theo Lockett	5.4	377	547
Freedom Alliance (UK)	Colin McMillan	0.9	61	71
Electorate: 18,586 Valid: 6,925 Spoilt: 73 Quota: 1,732 Turnout: 37.7%

=== Victoria Park ===
The SNP and Labour retained the seats they had won at the previous election while the Greens gained a seat from the Conservatives.

Victoria Park – 3 seats
Party	Candidate	FPv%	Count		
Party	Candidate	FPv%	1	2	3
Labour	Eunis Jassemi	28.4	2,447		
SNP	Feargal Dalton (incumbent)	26.6	2,291		
Green	Lana Reid-McConnell	23.4	2,016	2,102	2,200
Conservative	Ade Aibinu (incumbent)	15.8	1,364	1,419	1,422
Liberal Democrats	James Douglas Speirs	4.2	358	445	453
Alba	Mahmood Ullah	1.6	141	145	153
Electorate: 17,512 Valid: 8,617 Spoilt: 84 Quota: 2,155 Turnout: 49.7%

=== Garscadden/Scotstounhill ===
The SNP (2) and Labour (2) retained the seats they had won at the previous election.

Garscadden/Scotstounhill – 4 seats
Party	Candidate	FPv%	Count					
Party	Candidate	FPv%	1	2	3	4	5	6
Labour	Bill Butler (incumbent)	27.9	2,403					
SNP	Chris Cunningham (incumbent)	26.8	2,310					
Labour	Eva Murray (incumbent)	10.9	940	1,438	1,452	1,512	1,548	1,795
Conservative	Steven Morrison	10.3	886	932	935	966	968	1,001
SNP	Rosemary Ugbah	8.6	745	751	821	829		
Green	John Hamelink	8.3	712	747	802	845	939	
SNP	Malcolm Mitchell	5.3	460	479	802	845	1,554	1,993
Liberal Democrats	Hugh Waterfield	2.0	173	186	189			
Electorate: 22,355 Valid: 8,629 Spoilt: 293 Quota: 1,726 Turnout: 39.9%

=== Drumchapel/Anniesland ===
The SNP (2) and Labour (2) retained the seats they had won at the previous election.

Drumchapel/Anniesland − 4 seats
Party	Candidate	FPv%	Count						
Party	Candidate	FPv%	1	2	3	4	5	6	7
Labour	Paul Carey (incumbent)	27.8	2,011						
SNP	Anne McTaggart (incumbent)	20.0	1,446						
SNP	Fyeza Ikhlaq	13.1	945	959	969	971	1,278	1,366	1,626
Labour	Patricia Ferguson	10.3	747	1,191	1,209	1,240	1,252	1,368	1,495
Conservative	Pauline Sutherland	9.5	689	701	701	724	727	771	792
Green	Duncan Webford	6.1	438	444	475	498	523	610	
Independent	Elspeth Kerr (incumbent)	5.2	376	409	434	454	464		
SNP	Cylina Porch	4.8	350	358	369	373			
Liberal Democrats	Richard Frank Stalley	1.6	118	122	127				
Scottish Socialist	Joe Meehan	1.5	106	112					
Electorate: 21,148 Valid: 7,226 Spoilt: 222 Quota: 1,446 Turnout: 35.2%

=== Maryhill ===
The SNP (2) and Labour (1) retained the seats they had won at the previous election.

Maryhill − 3 seats
Party	Candidate	FPv%	Count						
Party	Candidate	FPv%	1	2	3	4	5	6	7
Labour	Keiran O'Neill	26.9	1,523						
SNP	Franny Scally (incumbent)	22.6	1,279	1,285	1,289	1,301	1,313	1,384	1,686
SNP	Abdul Bostani	19.5	1,106	1,110	1,110	1,121	1,132	1,166	1,481
Green	Amy Irene Marquez	12.3	696	699	704	737	779	908	
Conservative	Heather MacLeod	8.2	463	467	479	499			
Labour	Gwen Farrell Wall	7.1	402	481	489	523	720		
Liberal Democrats	Derek Dunnington	2.4	136	138	150				
Freedom Alliance (UK)	Damian Matthew Clark	1.0	58	58					
Electorate: 15,292 Valid: 5,663 Spoilt: 201 Quota: 1,416 Turnout: 38.3%

=== Canal ===
The SNP (2) and Labour (2) retained the seats they had won at the previous election.

Canal − 4 seats
Party	Candidate	FPv%	Count									
Party	Candidate	FPv%	1	2	3	4	5	6	7	8	9	10
SNP	Allan Gow (incumbent)	25.4	1,470									
Labour	Fiona Higgins	23.5	1,363									
Independent	Brian Land	12.8	746	760	770	779	793	798	831	875	877	
Labour	Robert Mooney (incumbent)	11.9	690	698	851	871	888	899	1,036	1,087	1,089	1,418
SNP	Jacqueline McLaren (incumbent)	8.8	512	733	739	743	761	976	979	1,172		
Green	Seonad Mairi Hoy	5.6	322	344	351	367	377	399	410			
Conservative	Maria Wells	5.2	299	300	305	316	321	322				
SNP	Sandra Watson	3.9	226	251	252	256	268					
Alba	Martin Lawson Olu-Osagie	1.7	96	99	100	103						
Liberal Democrats	Scott Simpson	1.2	68	69	74							
Electorate: 19,686 Valid: 5,792 Spoilt: 346 Quota: 1,159 Turnout: 31.2%

=== Springburn/Robroyston ===
Labour (2) and the SNP (2) retained the seats they had won at the previous election.

Springburn/Robroyston − 4 seats
Party	Candidate	FPv%	Count					
Party	Candidate	FPv%	1	2	3	4	5	6
Labour	Audrey Dempsey	32.2	2,184					
SNP	Graham Campbell (incumbent)	24.9	1,690					
SNP	Christina Cannon (incumbent)	16.3	1,109	1,149	1,439			
Labour	Thomas Rannachan	9.6	650	1,282	1,290	1,302	1,323	1,379
Conservative	Richard Johnson	9.0	614	643	643	644	649	671
Green	Madeleine Guthrie	4.2	288	308	319	348	383	443
Liberal Democrats	Peter Davies	2.1	143	162	166	170	181	
Alba	Farah Hamid	1.6	112	120	122	128		
Electorate: 19,948 Valid: 6,790 Spoilt: 252 Quota: 1,359 Turnout: 35.3%

=== East Centre ===
The SNP (2) and Labour (2) retained the seats they had won at the previous election.

East Centre − 4 seats
Party	Candidate	FPv%	Count										
Party	Candidate	FPv%	1	2	3	4	5	6	7	8	9	10	11
Labour	Ann Jenkins	28.1	1,954										
SNP	Declan Blench	19.4	1,348	1,364	1,365	1,376	1,380	1,431					
SNP	Annette Christie (incumbent)	14.9	1,014	1,024	1,025	1,036	1,040	1,101	1,133	1,174	1,753		
Conservative	Faten Hameed	9.9	688	710	717	725	746	749	749	806	811	819	
Labour	Kieran Turner	9.2	642	1,046	1,064	1,074	1,102	1,149	1,150	1,238	1,259	1,328	1,719
SNP	Kilian Riley	8.2	568	573	573	586	588	635	639	656			
Independent	William McLachlan	3.6	249	265	271	286	299	318	319				
Green	Hannah Smith	3.5	240	249	266	281	293						
Alba	Tony Osy	1.5	101	102	106								
Liberal Democrats	Ruth Lindsay	1.3	90	109	113	117							
TUSC	Matt Dobson	0.9	63	68									
Electorate: 20,113 Valid: 6,957 Spoilt: 268 Quota: 1,392 Turnout: 35.9%

=== Shettleston ===
Labour and the Conservatives retained the seats they had won at the previous election while the SNP retained one of their two seats and Labour gained one seat from the SNP.

Shettleston − 4 seats
Party	Candidate	FPv%	Count						
Party	Candidate	FPv%	1	2	3	4	5	6	7
SNP	Laura Doherty (incumbent)	27.8	2,048						
Labour	Frank McAveety (incumbent)	27.0	1,986						
Conservative	Thomas Kerr (incumbent)	16.7	1,232	1,238	1,269	1,288	1,294	1,333	1,368
Labour	Jill Pidgeon	12.3	903	928	1,316	1,346	1,379	1,468	1,899
SNP	David Turner (Note: Sitting councillor for Baillieston.)	7.6	556	985	997	1,004	1,045	1,292	
Green	Julie Ann Christie	5.0	370	433	445	463	524		
Scottish Socialist	Liam McLaughlan	2.2	164	176	188	194			
Liberal Democrats	Henry Sullivan	1.4	105	108	113				
Electorate: 20,542 Valid: 7,364 Spoilt: 256 Quota: 1,473 Turnout: 37.1%

=== Baillieston ===
Labour, the SNP and the Conservatives retained the seats they had won at the previous election.

Baillieston − 3 seats
Party	Candidate	FPv%	Count						
Party	Candidate	FPv%	1	2	3	4	5	6	7
Labour	Kevin John Lalley	30.5	2,209						
SNP	Alex Kerr	23.8	1,723	1,736	1,746	1,859			
Conservative	John Daly	16.6	1,206	1,223	1,260	1,279	1,279	1,510	1,867
SNP	Lauren Martin	14.4	1,046	1,056	1,064	1,154	1,194	1,384	
Labour	Mary McNab	7.9	568	882	940	998	1,000		
Green	Ryan Kelly	4.1	298	304	348				
Liberal Democrats	Tony Hughes	2.8	205	211					
Electorate: 18,569 Valid: 7,255 Spoilt: 166 Quota: 1,814 Turnout: 40.0%

=== North East ===
The SNP retained one of the two seats they had won at the previous election while Labour retained their seat and gained one from the SNP.

North East − 3 seats
Party	Candidate	FPv%	Count							
Party	Candidate	FPv%	1	2	3	4	5	6	7	8
Labour	Maureen Burke (incumbent)	34.0	1,532							
SNP	Ruairi Kelly (incumbent)	29.0	1,305							
SNP	Mandy Morgan (incumbent)	13.6	612	624	770	771	775	846	862	
Labour	Sharon Greer	9.9	447	790	798	804	815	852	1,067	1,349
Conservative	John White	8.6	389	403	404	407	415	422		
Green	Iain McLarty	3.0	136	141	151	157	175			
TUSC	Annie McAllister	1.2	52	56	57	62				
Scottish Libertarian	Cam Milne	0.6	28	31	31					
Electorate: 15,312 Valid: 4,501 Spoilt: 158 Quota: 1,126 Turnout: 30.4%

=== Dennistoun ===
The SNP, Labour and the Greens retained the seats they had won at the previous election.

Dennistoun − 3 seats
Party	Candidate	FPv%	Count		
Party	Candidate	FPv%	1	2	3
Labour	Elaine McDougall (incumbent)	29.2	1,595		
Green	Anthony Carroll	26.1	1,431		
SNP	Allan Casey (incumbent)	24.5	1,337	1,362	1,388
SNP	Lorna Finn	10.7	582	609	626
Conservative	Fiona McNider Connelly	6.2	339	370	370
Liberal Democrats	Fergus McCann	1.8	96	143	148
TUSC	Oisín Duncan	1.5	84	109	117
Electorate: 15,386 Valid: 5,464 Spoilt: 154 Quota: 1,367 Turnout: 36.5%

=== Partick East/Kelvindale ===
Labour, the SNP and the Greens retained the seats they had won at the previous election while Labour also gained one seat from the Conservatives.

Partick East/Kelvindale − 4 seats
Party	Candidate	FPv%	Count								
Party	Candidate	FPv%	1	2	3	4	5	6	7	8	9
Labour	Jill Brown (incumbent)	28.7	2,939								
Green	Blair Anderson	20.9	2,138								
SNP	Kenny McLean (incumbent)	17.6	1,800	1,828	1,854	1,855	1,874	1,910	3,004		
Conservative	Naveed Asghar	13.3	1,364	1,400	1,401	1,424	1,429	1,515	1,519	1,535	
SNP	Linsey Wilson	10.8	1,101	1,112	1,139	1,140	1,162	1,182			
Liberal Democrats	Nicholas Moohan	3.8	388	424	431	440	451				
Labour	Lilith Johnstone	3.5	358	1,110	1,130	1,141	1,153	1,323	1,354	1,654	2,378
Alba	Udochukwu Kings Nwaokorobia	0.8	81	82	82	87					
Freedom Alliance (UK)	Di McMillan	0.6	62	64	65						
Electorate: 21,995 Valid: 10,231 Spoilt: 133 Quota: 2,047 Turnout: 47.1%

== Aftermath ==
Despite losing two seats, the SNP retained their position as the largest party ahead of Labour. The result was welcomed by First Minister of Scotland Nicola Sturgeon who called the SNP's gain from the Conservatives in Pollokshields "seismic". Labour group leader Cllr Malcolm Cunning said the results pointed to the people in Glasgow looking for change after the party gained five seats. The election saw both the first refugees – Cllr Abdul Bostani and Cllr Roza Salih – to be elected as a councillor in Scotland and the first transgender person – Cllr Elaine Gallagher – elected to Glasgow City Council.

After the election, the SNP reached a working agreement with the Greens, similar in nature to the co-operation agreement in the Scottish Government but the Greens would not form part of the administration. Cllr Susan Aitken was returned as council leader and Cllr Richard Bell was elected as deputy leader, replacing David McDonald who had stood down before the election. Cllr Jacqueline McLaren was selected as Lord Provost – replacing Labour's Cllr Philip Braat – and, as part of the agreement with the Greens, Cllr Christy Mearns was re-elected as deputy Lord Provost.

Cllr Cunning was replaced as leader of the Labour group by Cllr George Redmond shortly after the election.

In April 2024, Springburn/Robroyston councillor Audrey Dempsey was suspended by Labour pending an investigation following allegedly racist social media posts. She later quit the party to sit as an independent councillor.

Former Lord Provost Cllr Braat was arrested and charged in connection with stalking offences in October 2024. He was also suspended by Labour pending an investigation.

In January 2025, Cllr Thomas Kerr defected from the Conservatives to Reform UK – a move branded "very disappointing" by party leader Russell Findlay – leaving the party with just one member on the council. He is the first Reform councillor in Glasgow and the fifth in Scotland.

Shettleston councillor Frank McAveety, a former council leader, MSP and Scottish Executive minister, was charged with electoral fraud in April 2025. He is alleged to have given a false address when standing for election to Glasgow City Council in 2022.

Springburn and Robroyston councillor Audrey Dempsey defected to Reform UK on 28 August 2025.

Three Green councillors, Dan Hutchison, Seonad Hoy and Leodhas Massie, defected to Your Party on 24 October 2025.

Council leader Susan Aitken announced her intention to stand down from the role in May 2026. She will formally resign and a new leader will be chosen at a meeting of the council on 10 September 2026.

=== Linn by-election ===
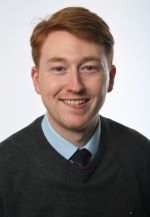
Cllr John Carson was elected following the Linn by-election.

In September 2022, Labour councillor for Linn and former group leader Malcolm Cunning died. A by-election was held on 17 November 2022 and was won by Labour candidate John Carson.

Linn by-election (17 November 2022) − 1 seat
Party	Candidate	FPv%	Count							
Party	Candidate	FPv%	1	2	3	4	5	6	7	8
Labour	John Carson	43.4	2,227	2,227	2,227	2,239	2,256	2,381	2,524	2,674
SNP	Chris Lang-Tait	33.2	1,702	1,703	1,703	1,716	1,750	1,777	1,789	2,046
Green	Jen Bell	8.0	409	409	410	419	433	482	503	
Conservative	Pauline Sutherland	6.4	327	329	332	332	335	374		
Liberal Democrats	Joe McCauley	5.7	294	299	299	301	304			
Alba	Kirsty Fraser	1.8	90	90	91	97				
Scottish Socialist	George Willis MacDougall	0.9	46	49	52					
UKIP	Christopher Ho	0.4	19	20						
Freedom Alliance (UK)	Diane McMillan	0.4	18							
Electorate: 22,340 Valid: 5,132 Spoilt: 73 Quota: 2,567 Turnout: 23.3%

=== Hillhead by-election ===
On 14 December 2023, Labour councillor for Hillhead Hanzala Malik died. A by-election was held on 7 March 2024 and was notable as the first by-election in Scotland won by the Greens after Seonad Hoy was elected.

Hillhead by-election (7 March 2024) − 1 seat
Party	Candidate	FPv%	Count						
Party	Candidate	FPv%	1	2	3	4	5	6	7
Labour	Ruth Hall	31.8	1,298	1,299	1,340	1,367	1,472	1,721	
Green	Seonad Hoy	31.5	1,284	1,284	1,298	1,353	1,372	1,908	2,605
SNP	Malcolm McConnell	24.9	1,015	1,017	1,025	1,062	1,076		
Conservative	Faten Hameed	5.3	217	221	233	240			
Independent Green Voice	Alistair McConnachie	3.2	133	135	146				
Liberal Democrats	Daniel O'Malley	2.6	106	110					
Independent	Ryan McGinley	0.5	22						
Electorate: 17,009 Valid: 4,075 Spoilt: 63 Quota: 2,038 Turnout: 24.3%

=== November 2024 by-elections ===
In September 2024, Drumchapel/Anniesland councillor Patricia Ferguson and North East councillor Maureen Burke (both Labour) resigned their council seats after successfully being elected as MPs for Glasgow West and Glasgow North East respectively at the 2024 United Kingdom general election. Shortly after, Labour councillor for Maryhill, Keiran O'Neill, resigned for personal reasons. By-elections were held on 21 November 2024 and were won by Labour candidates Mary McNab, Davena Rankin and Marie Garrity.

During the by-election campaign, Labour leader Anas Sarwar u-turned on his stance on means-testing the Winter Fuel Allowance in Scotland – a move which was called "hypocritical" and "convenient" by Kilian Riley, SNP candidate for the North East ward. The policy had previously been blamed for Labour losses following by-elections in Dundee.

A second by-election was required for the North East ward after McNab did not resign from her position as an employee of Glasgow City Council within the required timeframe. An initial legal challenge from Labour saw the issue referred to Sheriff Principal Aisha Anwar for a ruling but the party dropped the challenge in January 2025 after McNab accepted she should have been disqualified and resigned her council seat.

Drumchapel/Anniesland by-election (21 November 2024) − 1 seat
Party	Candidate	FPv%	Count						
Party	Candidate	FPv%	1	2	3	4	5	6	7
Labour	Davena Rankin	34.3	1,084	1,108	1,143	1,193	1,263	1,385	1,857
SNP	Adekemi Giwa	26.3	830	841	847	971	1,083	1,134	
Reform	Allan Douglas Lyons	12.8	405	412	461	473	524		
Independent	Elsbeth Kerr	9.4	297	310	331	372			
Green	Christopher Lavelle	8.3	263	270	275				
Conservative	Steven Morrison	5.8	184	196					
Liberal Democrats	Michael Edward Shields	2.9	93						
Electorate: 20,895 Valid: 3,156 Spoilt: 42 Quota: 1,579 Turnout: 15.3%

Maryhill by-election (21 November 2024) − 1 seat
Party	Candidate	FPv%	Count						
Party	Candidate	FPv%	1	2	3	4	5	6	7
Labour	Marie Garrity	35.9	999	1,013	1,043	1,057	1,163	1,258	1,731
SNP	Lorna Margaret Finn	29.2	814	817	820	868	1,052	1,093	
Reform	David Jamie McGowan	12.7	353	360	384	398	410		
Green	Ellie Gomersall	12.1	338	352	357	372			
Alba	Nick Durie	4.2	118	121	127				
Conservative	Susan McCourt	3.2	89	100					
Liberal Democrats	Daniel John O'Malley	2.7	75						
Electorate: 14,619 Valid: 2,786 Spoilt: 40 Quota: 1,394 Turnout: 19.3%

North East by-election (21 November 2024) − 1 seat
Party	Candidate	FPv%	Count						
Party	Candidate	FPv%	1	2	3	4	5	6	7
Labour	Mary McNab	34.3	630	642	655	671	708	808	1,069
SNP	Kilian Riley	32.2	591	596	605	632	638	686	
Reform	Robert McGregor	18.2	336	337	349	366	397		
Conservative	Thomas Haddow	5.3	99	104	107	111			
Green	Hayley McDonald	4.2	77	79	94				
TUSC	Anne McAllister	3.7	68	72					
Liberal Democrats	Peter McLaughlin	1.9	36						
Electorate: 15,040 Valid: 1,837 Spoilt: 31 Quota: 919 Turnout: 12.4%

=== Partick East/Kelvindale by-election ===
In September 2024, SNP councillor for Partick East/Kelvindale Kenny McLean died following an illness. A by-election was held on 5 December 2024 and was won by Labour candidate James Adams.

Partick East/Kelvindale by-election (5 December 2024) − 1 seat
Party	Candidate	FPv%	Count			
Party	Candidate	FPv%	1	2	3	4
Labour	James Adams	37.5	1,723	1,854	2,143	2,485
SNP	Cylina Porch	23.1	1,062	1,089	1,112	1,532
Green	Heloise Le Moal	18.2	837	870	927	
Conservative	Faten Hameed	13.7	632	707		
Liberal Democrats	Nicholas Budgen	7.4	339			
Electorate: 21,307 Valid: 4,593 Spoilt: 36 Quota: 2,297 Turnout: 21.7%

=== March 2025 by-elections ===
Two by-elections were held on 20 March 2025 due to the death of Southside Central Labour councillor James Scanlon and previous North East by-election winner McNab resigned amid a legal challenge to allow her to take up her seat which was subsequently dropped. The by-elections were won by SNP candidates Mhairi Hunter and Donna McGill.

Southside Central by-election (20 March 2025) − 1 seat
Party	Candidate	FPv%	Count							
Party	Candidate	FPv%	1	2	3	4	5	6	7	8
SNP	Mhairi Hunter	30.0	1,126	1,129	1,132	1,159	1,187	1,243	1,775	2,305
Labour	Samina Rashid	27.4	1,027	1,034	1,045	1,079	1,107	1,150	1,366	
Green	Laura Vroomen	21.5	805	805	814	837	856	994		
Scottish Socialist	Olivia Murphy	7.2	271	272	274	301	323			
Reform	Danny Raja	5.9	222	241	267	277				
Liberal Democrats	Nicholas Budgen	4.1	155	157	172					
Conservative	Kyle Park	2.7	102	105						
UKIP	Travis Power	1.1	41							
Electorate: 20,348 Valid: 3,749 Spoilt: 66 Quota: 1,875 Turnout: 18.7%

North East by-election (20 March 2025) − 1 seat
Party	Candidate	FPv%	Count							
Party	Candidate	FPv%	1	2	3	4	5	6	7	8
SNP	Donna McGill	34.5	689	690	692	700	711	754	815	1,060
Labour	Debbie Duffy	28.7	573	576	581	591	612	623	728	
Reform	Rob Maddison	23.6	472	482	484	489	506	516		
Conservative	Kyle Cannon	4.1	81	85	87	88				
Green	Hayley McDonald	3.5	70	70	82	90	97			
TUSC	Anne McAllister	2.6	52	53	55					
Liberal Democrats	Peter McLaughlin	1.9	37	37						
UKIP	Christopher Ho	1.2	24							
Electorate: 14,955 Valid: 1,998 Spoilt: 31 Quota: 1,000 Turnout: 13.6%
