= Volt UK =

British political party

Volt United Kingdom Volt Y Deyrnas Unedig
- Abbreviation: Volt UK / Volt
- Leader: Jamie Beresford
- Treasurer: Luis Perdigao
- Campaigns officer: Vacant
- Founded: 6 January 2020; 6 years ago
- Registered: PP8009
- Headquarters: London
- Women's wing: Volt Women UK
- Ideology: Social liberalism; Progressivism; Pro-Europeanism
- Political position: Centre to centre-left
- European political alliance: Volt Europa
- Colours: Purple

Website
- voltuk.org

National sections of Volt Europa. The borders of the European Union are shown in red.

Volt United Kingdom, commonly known as Volt UK, is a pro-European minor political party in the United Kingdom. It is the British branch of Volt Europa, a political movement that operates on a European level.

== History ==
Volt UK was founded in London on 6 January 2020, with Philipp Gnatzy as its first leader.

=== 2021 ===
In the 2021 local elections, the party stood one candidate for election to a local authority, Luis Perdigao in Cubbington & Leek Wootton Ward in Warwickshire; he lost, with about 2% of the vote. He campaigned in particular for improvements in the transport sector and public transport, in addition to avoiding damage from Brexit.

In London, Volt backed Richard Hewison, Rejoin EU's candidate in the London mayoral election, and the two parties stood a joint list for the London-wide assembly election. Hewison received 1.1% of the mayoral vote, while the two parties received 49,389 votes (1.91%) for the Assembly, not winning a seat.

The party also stood, unsuccessfully, in the Scottish Parliament election on a joint list with Renew Scotland.

=== 2022 ===
In May 2022, the party contested the Glasgow City Council election. Volt received 4.1% of the first-preference vote in the Pollokshields ward, not winning a seat.

=== 2023 ===
On 2 August Volt announced Ewan Hoyle as their candidate for the Rutherglen and Hamilton West by-election, the first party candidate in a national election. He received 46 votes, 0.15% of those cast.

=== 2024 ===
Three Volt UK candidates: Charlotte Blake, Alessandro Gallo, and Marianne Mandujano, were included on the Rejoin EU candidate list for the 2024 London Assembly election on 2 May 2024. Rejoin EU received 2.52% of the vote (62,528 votes), finishing in sixth place and retaining their deposit.

Volt UK stood two candidates in the 2024 general election: Annaliese Cude in Newton Abbot, and Jason Hughes in Stroud. Neither were elected.

=== 2025 ===
On 6 April 2025, Jason Hughes was announced as Volt UK's candidate for the Runcorn and Helsby by-election.

=== 2026 ===
On 19 February 2026 Volt UK endorsed the Rejoin EU candidate Joseph O'Meachair for the 2026 Gorton and Denton by-election.

== Ideology and policies ==
The party states that it supports the "5+1 fundamental challenges" defined by Volt Europa: a smart state, economic renaissance, social equality, global balance, citizen empowerment, and European reform. In addition to the pan-European policies of Volt, additional policies of the British branch include electoral reform, rejoining the EU, action to address climate change, and reform of political campaigns.

== Volt Scotland ==
Volt Scotland is the Scottish branch of Volt UK. It stood two candidates in the 2021 Scottish Parliament election on Renew Scotland's party list, though neither were elected. For the Scottish Parliament elections, Volt endorsed a multiple-choice referendum on the issue of Scottish independence, alongside Renew Scotland. Renew Scotland contested five regions and no constituencies in the election, receiving 493 votes nationwide. Volt UK also stood one candidate at the 2022 Scottish local elections, with their candidate receiving 4.06% of first preference votes in the four-member Pollokshields ward.

== Electoral performance ==
=== Scottish Parliament ===
Election	Political party	Constituency			Regional			Total seats	+/–	Government
Election	Political party	Vote	%	Seats	Vote	%	Seats	Total seats	+/–	Government
2021	Volt Scotland (as part of Renew Scotland)	N/A		0 / 73	493 (Renew Scotland)	0.02% (Renew Scotland)	0 / 56	0 / 129	New	—N/a

Renew Scotland contested in five regions and no constituencies in the 2021 Scottish Parliament election.

=== 2024 general election ===
The party fielded two candidates at the 2024 United Kingdom general election on 4 July 2024, one in Newton Abbot and one in Stroud. The candidates accumulated a total of 267 votes and came last in both constituencies.

Election year	Constituency	# of total votes	% of overall vote	# of seats won	Outcome
2024	Newton Abbott	104 ▲	0.2% ▲	0 / 650	No seats
2024	Stroud	163 ▲	0.3% ▲	0 / 650	No seats

=== By-elections ===
The party stood a candidate in the 2026 Antony Parish Council by-election on 3 September 2026, who came second and was not elected.

Election year	Constituency	# of seats won	Outcome
2026	Antony Parish	0 / 1	No seats
