= Wards of Glasgow =

- Electoral Districts (Wards)
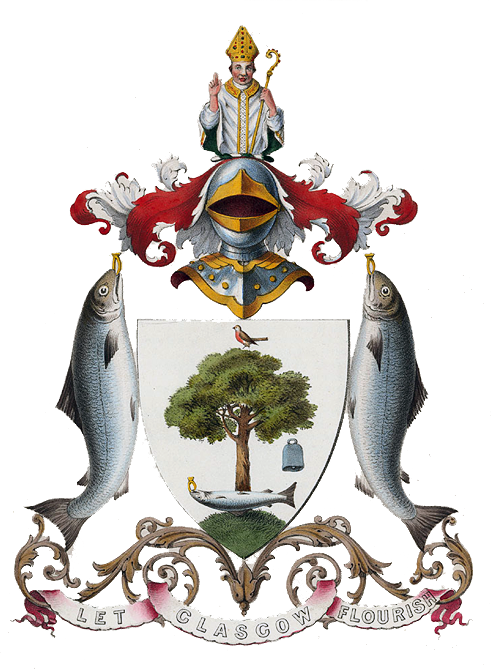
- This is the coat of arms for the City of Glasgow Corporation. Two bodies have followed the Corporation and used their own version of the city coat of arms: The City Of Glasgow District Council and the current local authority, the City Of Glasgow Council / Glasgow City Council.
- Country: Scotland
- City: Glasgow
- Council: Glasgow City Council

Area
  - Total: 176 km^{2} (68 sq mi)

Population 2015
  - Total: 606,340
  - Density: 3,450/km^{2} (8,920/sq mi)

The City of Glasgow is divided into a number of wards. These electoral districts, as they are also known, are used to elect councillors to Glasgow City Council. The council, composed of the elected members from each ward, provides local government services to the City of Glasgow.

There are 23 wards situated within the perimeters of Glasgow City Council. Each one elects 3 or 4 councillors every five years in the Scottish local council elections. The most recent elections were held in 2022.

Glasgow City Council is one of the 32 council areas for Scotland (each council containing a number of wards). The boundaries for all Scottish council areas and their sub divisional wards are regulated and regularly reviewed by the Local Government Boundary Commission for Scotland.

== Map ==
The following is a map of the party representation for each ward following the 2022 Glasgow City Council election.

Results of the 2022 local council elections for Glasgow

Party colour	Party name
	Conservative
	Scottish Green
	Labour
	Scottish National Party

== List of Wards (2017) ==
The following is a list of each Glasgow ward and its population data.

Ward Number	Ward Name	Location with respect to the River Clyde	Area (km^{2})	Population (2015 estimate)	Density (inhabitants/km^{2})	Seats
1.	Linn	South	11.10	29,575	2,664	4
2.	Newlands/Auldburn	South	9.93	23,144	2,330	3
3.	Greater Pollok	South	11.70	30,729	2,626	4
4.	Cardonald	South	7.27	29,639	4,076	4
5.	Govan	South	8.26	26,769	3,240	4
6.	Pollokshields	South	6.29	27,983	4,448	3
7.	Langside	South	4.67	29,060	6,222	4
8.	Southside Central	South	4.29	25,266	5,889	4
9.	Calton	North	6.38	27,460	4,304	4
10.	Anderston/City/Yorkhill	North	5.75	30,184	5,249	4
11.	Hillhead	North	2.92	25,411	8,702	3
12.	Victoria Park	North	4.41	20,950	4,750	3
13.	Garscadden/Scotstounhill	North	5.94	30,565	5,145	4
14.	Drumchapel/Anniesland	North	7.30	29,432	4,031	4
15.	Maryhill	North	4.99	22,244	4,457	3
16.	Canal	North	14.40	25,000	1,736	4
17.	Springburn/Robroyston	North	9.50	27,237	2,867	4
18.	East Centre	North	6.36	27,991	4,401	4
19.	Shettleston	North	10.40	25,806	2,481	4
20.	Baillieston	North	10.10	21,663	2,144	3
21.	North East	North	14.90	20,457	1,372	3
22.	Dennistoun	North	5.21	20,861	4,004	3
23.	Partick East/Kelvindale	North	3.91	28,914	7,394	4
Σ	Total (Glasgow City)	31 Wards *8 - South/15 - North*	175.98	606,340	3,445	85

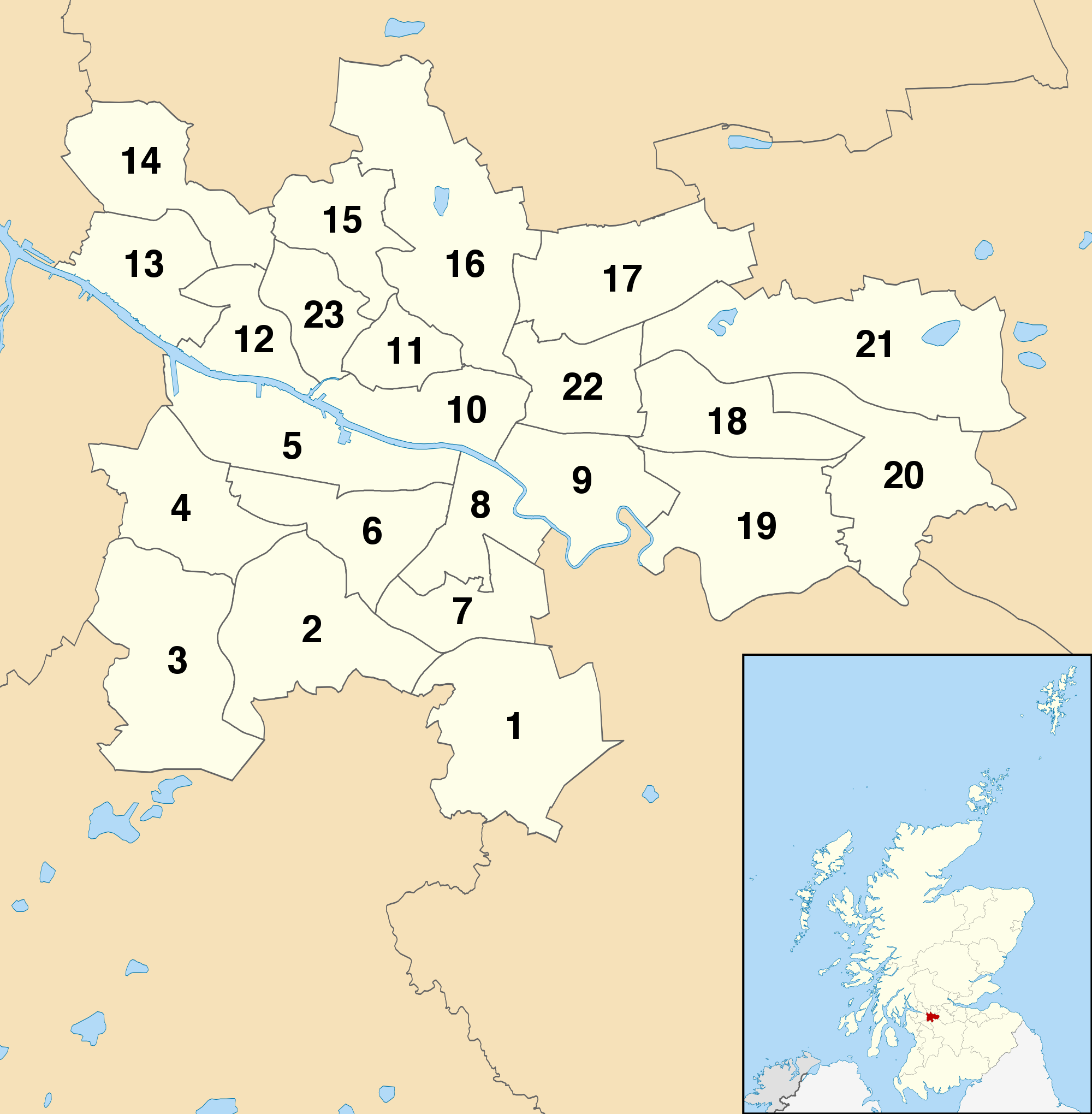
Glasgow wards by number

== Previous ward systems ==
=== 2007 to 2017 multi-member wards ===
Prior to the introduction of the 2017 boundaries, a similar multi-member system divided among 21 wards was introduced for the 2007 council election, also used in 2012:

Ward	Number of councillors	Representation (2012)
1. Linn	4	2 Lab; 1 SNP; 1 Lib Dem
2. Newlands/Auldburn	3	2 Lab; 1 SNP
3. Greater Pollok	4	2 Lab; 2 SNP
4. Craigton	4	2 Lab; 2 SNP
5. Govan	4	3 Lab; 1 SNP
6. Pollokshields	3	1 Lab; 1 Con; 1 SNP
7. Langside	3	2 SNP; 1 Lab
8. Southside Central	4	2 Lab; 2 SNP
9. Calton	3	2 Lab; 1 SNP
10. Anderston/City	4	2 SNP; 1 Lab; 1 Green
11. Hillhead	4	2 Lab; 1 SNP; 1 Green
12. Partick West	4	2 SNP; 1 Green; 1 Ind
13. Garscadden/Scotstounhill	4	2 Lab; 2 SNP
14. Drumchapel/Anniesland	4	3 Lab; 1 SNP
15. Maryhill/Kelvin	4	2 Lab; 2 SNP
16. Canal	4	2 Lab; 1 Ind; 1 Green
17. Springburn	3	2 Lab; 1 SNP
18. East Centre	4	2 Lab; 2 SNP
19. Shettleston	4	3 Lab; 1 SNP
20. Baillieston	4	2 Lab; 2 SNP
21. North East	4	3 Lab; 1 SNP

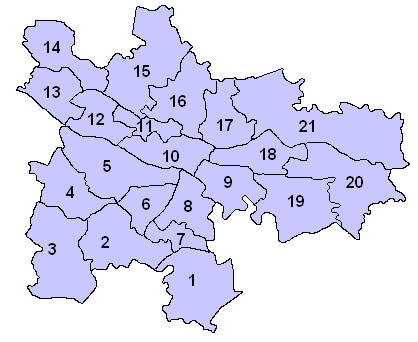
Map of Multi-member wards by number, used in 2007 and 2012 council elections

=== 1995 to 2007 single-member wards ===
From 1999 until the 2007 election, there were 79 councillors elected from 79 small single-member wards by the plurality (first past the post) system of election. The result from this system in 2003 was 69 of the 79 councillors representing the Labour Party, although that party gained only around half the votes cast in the election to the council, and the Scottish National Party represented by just four councillors, despite gaining some 20% of the votes. There were also three Liberal Democrat councillors, one from the Conservative party, and one from the Scottish Socialist Party.

The earlier election returns were even more skewed in terms of seats versus overall vote share due to the voting system in use: in 1999 council election result, Labour received 74 seats (94%) from 49% of the vote and the SNP received two seats from 29% vote share. In the first GCC election in 1995, which included 83 wards, Labour won 77 (93%) of the seats from approximately 62% of the overall vote, while the SNP's 23% overall vote share gave them only one seat.

Wards list (1999 and 2003 elections)

Ward	Ward	Ward	Ward
1. Drumry; 2. Summerhill; 3. Blairdardie; 4. Knightswood Park; 5. Knightswood South; 6. Yoker; 7. Anniesland; 8. Jordanhill; 9. Kelvindale; 10. Scotstoun; 11. Victoria Park; 12. Hayburn; 13. Hyndland; 14. Hillhead; 15. Partick; 16. Kelvingrove; 17. Anderston; 18. Woodlands; 19. North Kelvin; 20. Wyndford	21. Maryhill; 22. Summerston; 23. Milton; 24. Ashfield; 25. Firhill; 26. Keppochhill; 27. Merchant City; 28. Royston; 29. Cowlairs; 30. Springburn; 31. Wallacewell; 32. Milnbank; 33. Dennistoun; 34. Calton; 35. Bridgeton/ Dalmarnock; 36. Parkhead; 37. Carntyne; 38. Robroyston; 39. Gartcraig; 40. Queenslie	41. Greenfield; 42. Barlanark; 43. Shettleston; 44. Tollcross Park; 45. Braidfauld; 46. Mount Vernon; 47. Baillieston; 48. Garrowhill; 49. Garthamlock; 50. Easterhouse; 51. Drumoyne; 52. Govan; 53. Ibrox; 54. Kingston; 55. Mosspark; 56. North Cardonald; 57. Penilee; 58. Cardonald; 59. Pollok; 60. Crookston	61. Nitshill; 62. Darnley; 63. Carnwadric; 64. Maxwell Park; 65. Pollokshields East; 66. Hutchesontown; 67. Govanhill; 68. Strathbungo; 69. Battlefield; 70. Langside; 71. Pollokshaws; 72. Newlands; 73. Cathcart; 74. Mount Florida; 75. Toryglen; 76. Kings Park; 77. Castlemilk; 78. Carmunnock; 79. Glenwood

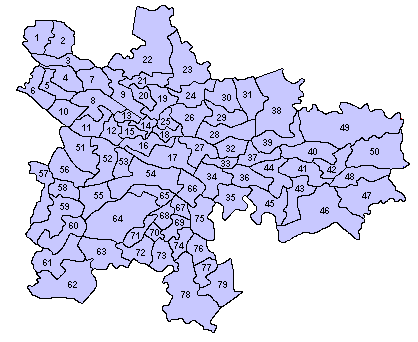
Map of 79 wards used in 1999 and 2003 council elections (amended from 1995, 83 wards)

== See also ==
- Demographics of Glasgow
- Politics of Glasgow
- Subdivisions of Scotland
