= Holly Bruce =

Scottish Greens politician

Holly Bruce MSP
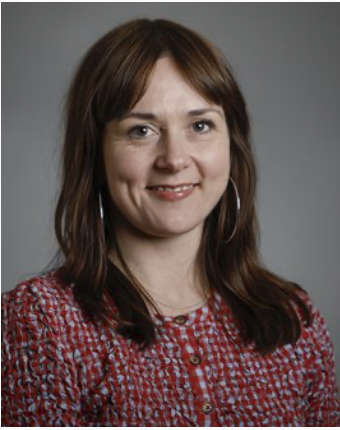
- Official portrait, 2026

Member of Scottish Parliament for Glasgow Southside
- Incumbent
- Assumed office 7 May 2026
- Preceded by: Nicola Sturgeon
- Majority: 3,101 (8.1%)

Scottish Green Shadow portfolios
- 2026-: Social Justice

Councillor for Langside
- Incumbent
- Assumed office 5 May 2022

Personal details
- Born: Holly Hay Bruce; 2 October 1993 (age 33) Fraserburgh, Aberdeenshire, Scotland
- Party: Scottish Greens
- Education: Fraserburgh Academy
- Alma mater: University of Aberdeen; University of Glasgow

Holly Hay Bruce (born 2 October 1993) is a Scottish politician. A member of the Scottish Greens, she has served as the member of the Scottish Parliament (MSP) for Glasgow Southside since 2026.

Prior to her election to the Scottish Parliament, Bruce served as a councillor for the Langside ward on Glasgow City Council from 2022. During her time on the council she was associated with campaigns relating to housing, active travel, environmental policy and local community services in Glasgow's south side.

Bruce is one the first two Scottish Greens candidates, with Lorna Slater, to win a constituency seat at a Scottish general election, rather than via a regional list. She won the seat from the Scottish National Party, succeeding former first minister Nicola Sturgeon, who stood down in the election.

== Early life ==
Bruce was born on 2 October 1993 in Fraserburgh, Aberdeenshire. She has stated that she became involved in politics at an early age, citing issues including class and feminism as key influences. She has also referenced the 2014 Scottish independence referendum as a factor in increasing her political engagement.

Bruce studied Scots law at the University of Aberdeen, serving as communities president at Aberdeen University Students' Union and graduating with a Bachelor of Laws (LLB) degree in 2015. She later completed a Master of Laws (LLM) degree in Intellectual Property and the Digital Economy at the University of Glasgow in 2018.

== Political career ==
=== Local government ===
Bruce was elected as a councillor for the Langside ward in the 2022 Glasgow City Council election. She secured election on first-preference votes, ahead of Scottish National Party council leader Susan Aitken, in one of the party's strongest results in the city.

During her time on the council, she has supported policies aimed at improving public safety and accessibility in urban spaces, including measures such as improved street lighting, expanded public facilities, and increased community consultation in local planning decisions. In 2022 Bruce led a successful motion for feminist town planning to be written into policy, which saw Glasgow become the first “Feminist City” in the UK.

In October 2025, Bruce introduced a motion addressing childcare provision in Glasgow. The proposal highlighted shortages in out-of-school care and nursery places, citing long waiting lists and high demand for early years provision.

=== Member of the Scottish Parliament ===
Bruce was selected as the Green candidate for the Glasgow Southside seat in the 2026 election to the Scottish Parliament following an internal party selection process. Her candidacy formed part of the party's effort to win its first constituency seat, with Glasgow Southside identified as a potential target based on recent electoral performance when Nicola Sturgeon was leaving the Scottish Parliament.

Bruce's campaign was successful and she was elected on 7 May 2026, winning the seat that had been held by Sturgeon since 2007. She defeated the SNP candidate and equalities minister, Kaukab Stewart, by over 3,000 votes. Her win, alongside Lorna Slater's win in Edinburgh Central, marked the first time a Green MSP had won a constituency seat in the parliament, as all previous Green MSPs had been elected through the party list vote.

After being elected, Bruce told the digital platform Greater Govanhill about her plans. "[T]wo main issues that we've been focusing on in Glasgow is bringing rent controls to Glasgow as soon as possible," she said. "[A]nd I know that Glasgow Southside really wants to see that ASAP. Also, public transport is another big issue – one of the top lines for the campaign has been free bus travel for everyone in Scotland. So we want to work on that on day one in Parliament. And also my track record as a councillor has been to advocate for feminist town planning, so I would like to see and start working with the chief town planner in Scotland and how we can make that a reality nationally."

Bruce is currently the Scottish Green's spokesperson for Social Justice.

== Personal life ==
Bruce has lived in Glasgow since moving there for university in 2016. She is bisexual and has been openly supportive of transgender rights.

According to her published register of interests as a councillor, Bruce has declared employment as a regional support officer to Patrick Harvie, along with memberships of organisations including Unite the Union and the Scottish Green Party. Until October 2025, she was a shareholder in Brewdog.
