= Hillhead (ward) =

Electoral ward in Glasgow, Scotland

Hillhead: Scottish Gaelic: Ceann a' Chnuic; Scots: Hullheid
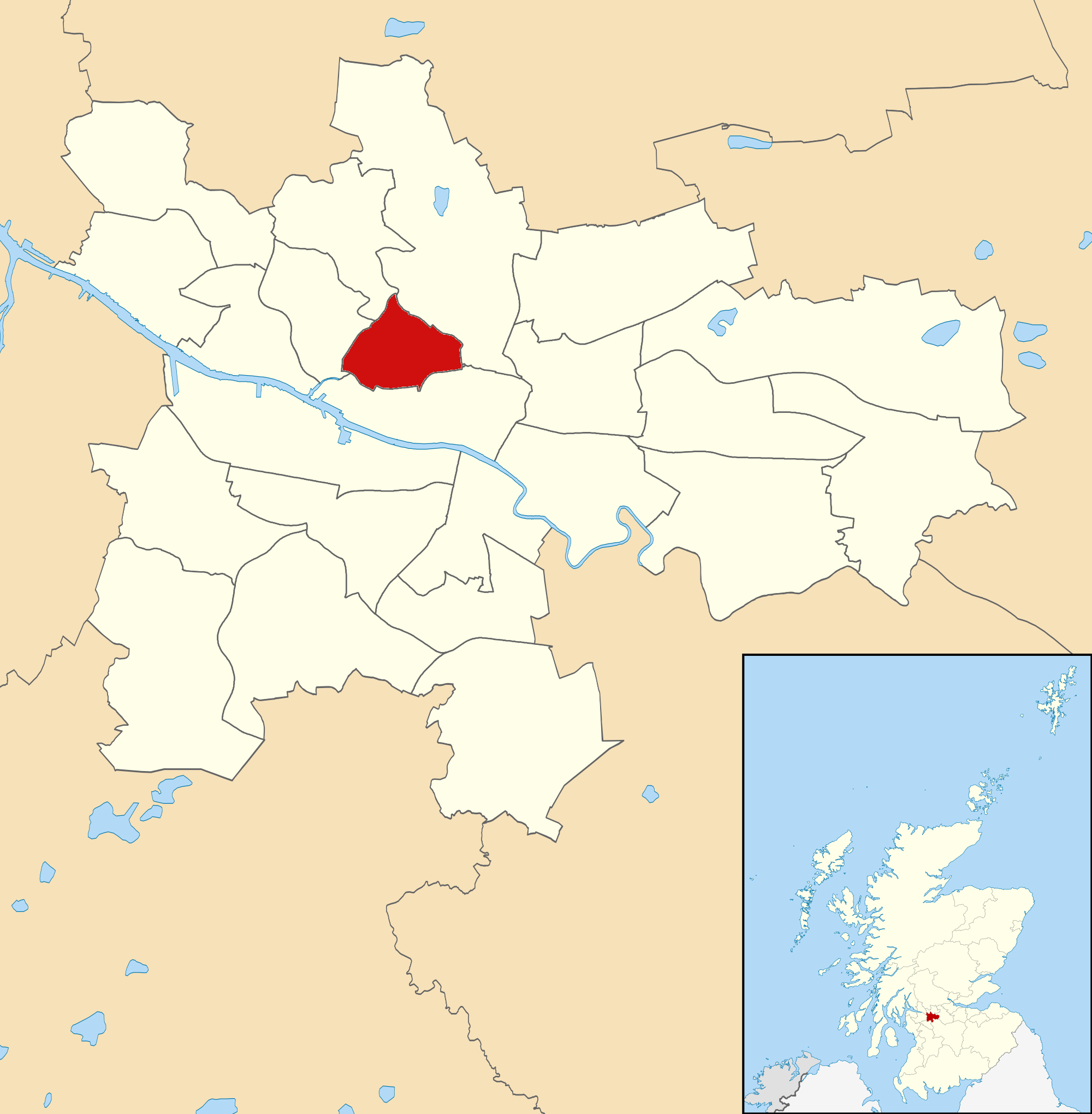
- Hillhead Ward (2017) within Glasgow

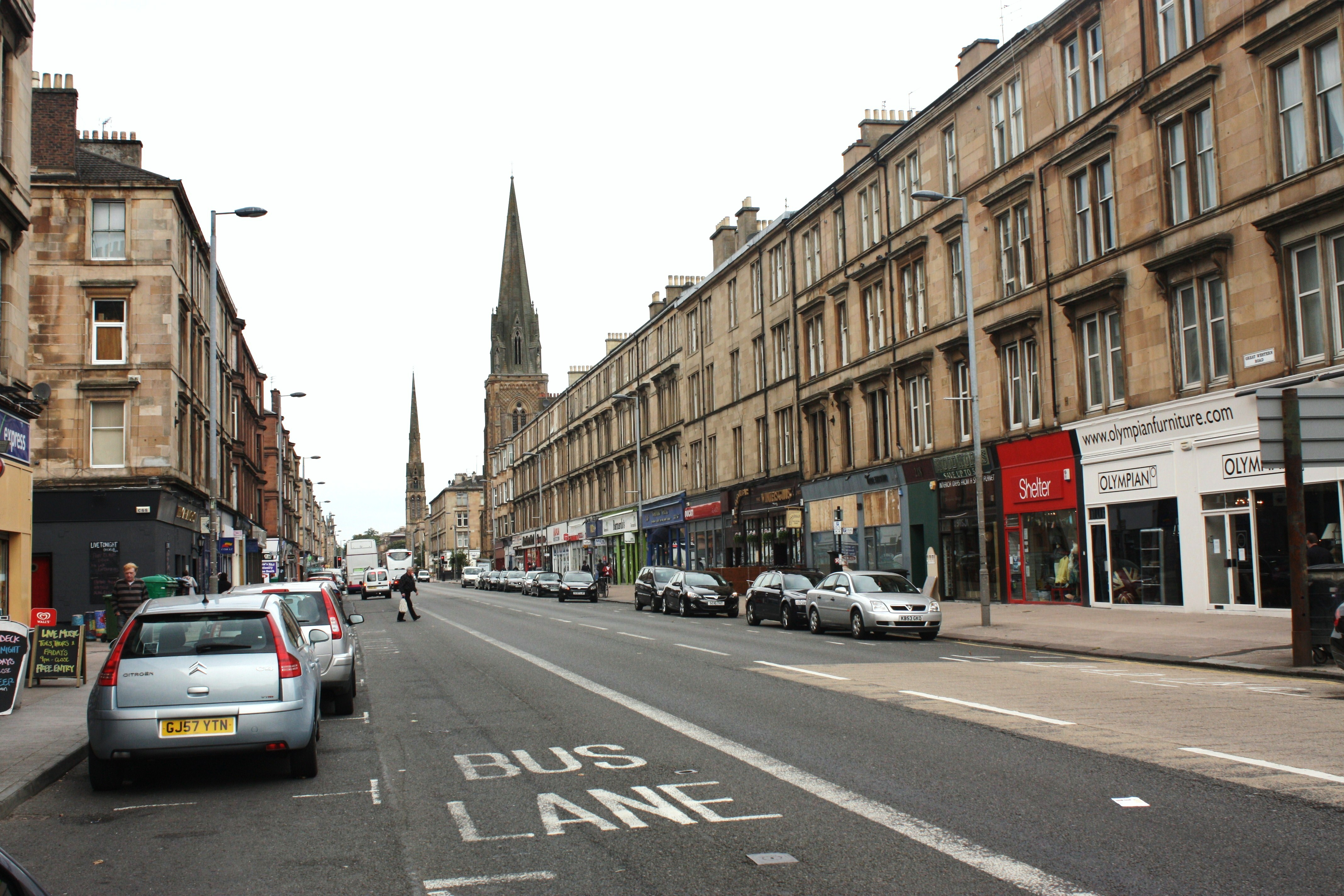
- View looking west along Great Western Road which bisects the Hillhead ward
- Area: 2.92 km^{2} (1.13 sq mi)
- Population: 25,411 (2015)
  - Density: 8,702.4/km^{2} (22,539/sq mi)
- Council area: Glasgow City Council
- Lieutenancy area: Glasgow
- Country: Scotland
- Sovereign state: United Kingdom
- Post town: GLASGOW
- Postcode district: G3, G4, G12, G20
- Dialling code: 0141
- Police: Scotland
- Fire: Scottish
- Ambulance: Scottish

Hillhead (Ward 11) is one of the 23 wards of Glasgow City Council. On its creation in 2007 and in 2012, it returned four council members, using the single transferable vote system. For the 2017 Glasgow City Council election, the boundaries were changed substantially, the ward slightly decreased in population and returned three members.

== Boundaries ==
Situated to the west of Glasgow city centre, the core of the ward which has remained since its 2007 creation consists of Hillhead, Kelvinbridge, Gilmorehill (the University of Glasgow main campus), Woodlands and Woodside, with boundaries being the M8 motorway to the south-east and the Port Dundas branch of the Forth and Clyde Canal to the north-east.

Other aspects of the ward were substantially altered in 2017, with the Dowanhill and Hyndland neighbourhoods reassigned to a new Partick East/Kelvindale ward and Byres Road becoming the south-west boundary; most of the North Kelvinside neighbourhood (streets to the east of Queen Margaret Drive, which became Hillhead's north-west boundary) was gained from the Canal ward, and the Park District (along with Kelvingrove Park itself) was gained from the Anderston/City ward, with the park's south entrances the new southern boundary of Hillhead.

Following these alterations, it was the smallest ward in physical size but the most densely populated, despite the park taking up a proportion of the territory.

== Demographics ==
According to the 2011 census, the ethnicity of the population was:

Ethnicity	Proportion
White Scottish/British	68.97%
White Irish	3%
Other White	8%
Mixed Ethnic Groups	1.17%
Indian	2.33%
Pakistani	6.08%
Bangladeshi	0.02%
Chinese	4.89%
Other Asian	1.61%
African	1.81%
Caribbean or Black	0.03%
Other Ethnic Group	1.63%

== Councillors ==
Election	Councillors			
2007	Hanzala Malik (Labour)	George A Roberts (SNP)	Martha Wardrop (Green)	Kenneth Elder (Liberal Democrats)
2011 by	Hanzala Malik (Labour)	Ken Andrew (SNP)	Martha Wardrop (Green)	Kenneth Elder (Liberal Democrats)
2012	Martin McElroy (Labour)	Ken Andrew (SNP)	Martha Wardrop (Green)	Pauline McKeever (Labour)
2017	Hanzala Malik (Labour)	Ken Andrew (SNP)	Martha Wardrop (Green)	3 seats
2022	Hanzala Malik (Labour)	Ken Andrew (SNP)	Martha Wardrop (Green)	3 seats
2024 by	Seonad Hoy (Green)	Ken Andrew (SNP)	Martha Wardrop (Green)	3 seats

== Election results ==
=== 2024 by-election ===
On 7 March 2024 a by-election was held following the death of Labour councillor Hanzala Malik.

Hillhead by-election (7 March 2024) − 1 seat
Party	Candidate	FPv%	Count						
Party	Candidate	FPv%	1	2	3	4	5	6	7
Labour	Ruth Hall	31.8	1,298	1,299	1,340	1,367	1,472	1,721	
Green	Seonad Hoy	31.5	1,284	1,284	1,298	1,353	1,372	1,908	2,605
SNP	Malcolm McConnell	24.9	1,015	1,017	1,025	1,062	1,076		
Conservative	Faten Hameed	5.3	217	221	233	240			
Independent Green Voice	Alistair McConnachie	3.2	133	135	146				
Liberal Democrats	Daniel O'Malley	2.6	106	110					
Independent	Ryan McGinley	0.5	22						
Electorate: 17,009 Valid: 4,075 Spoilt: 63 Quota: 2,038 Turnout: 24.3%

=== 2022 election ===
Hillhead – 3 seats
Party	Candidate	FPv%	Count	
Party	Candidate	FPv%	1	2
Green	Martha Wardrop (incumbent)	36.2	2,507	
SNP	Ken Andrew (incumbent)	28.7	1,984	
Labour	Hanzala Malik (incumbent)	22.1	1,532	1,914
Conservative	Mark Russell	6.7	464	477
Liberal Democrats	Theo Lockett	5.4	377	547
Freedom Alliance (UK)	Colin McMillan	0.9	61	71
Electorate: 18,586 Valid: 6,925 Spoilt: 73 Quota: 1,732 Turnout: 37.7%

=== 2017 election ===
Hillhead – 3 seats
Party	Candidate	FPv%	Count							
Party	Candidate	FPv%	1	2	3	4	5	6	7	8
Green	Martha Wardrop (incumbent)	25.63%	1,718							
Labour	Hanzala Malik	21.73%	1,457	1,464	1,465	1,469	1,625	1,935		
SNP	Ken Andrew (incumbent)	22.49%	1,508	1,516	1,519	1,522	1,545	1.575	1,624	2,632
SNP	Caroline Welsh	14.66%	983	998	1,000	1,004	1,030	1,046	1,076	
Conservative	Martyn McIntyre	10.14%	680	680	686	693	744			
Liberal Democrats	Matthew Clark	4.45%	298	303	307	311				
No label	Douglas Timmons	0.51%	34	34	37					
Scottish Libertarian	Anthony Sammeroff	0.39%	26	26						
Electorate: 17,923 Valid: 6,704 Spoilt: 89 Quota: 1,677 Turnout: 37.9%

=== 2012 election ===
Hillhead – 4 seats
Party	Candidate	FPv%	Count												
Party	Candidate	FPv%	1	2	3	4	5	6	7	8	9	10	11	12	13
SNP	Ken Andrew (incumbent)	24.62%	1,424												
Green	Martha Wardrop (incumbent)	17.62%	1,019	1,037	1,037	1,039	1,049	1,055	1,099	1,185					
Labour	Martin McElroy	17.31%	1,001	1,015	1,018	1,019	1,023	1,030	1,041	1,068	1,071	1,129	1,211		
Labour	Pauline McKeever	12.14%	702	709	710	711	712	712	720	741	746	799	835	880	1,019
SNP	Mark Smith	8.44%	488	676	676	678	682	683	690	711	720	780	826	827	
Conservative	Alexander Inglis	6.54%	378	380	383	386	394	413	415	464	465	541			
Independent	Ruth Simpson	5.79%	335	340	340	340	343	355	356	386	391				
Liberal Democrats	Kenneth Elder (incumbent)	4.10%	237	244	245	248	252	255	259						
Scottish Socialist	Frances Curran	1.42%	82	86	86	86	87	89							
UKIP	Neil Craig	0.85%	49	51	56	57	65								
Scottish Christian	Murdo MacLeod	0.74%	43	44	44	46									
Glasgow First	Iain Firth	0.22%	13	14	15										
Britannica Party	Charles Baillie	0.21%	12	13											
Electorate: 20,981 Valid: 5,783 Spoilt: 113 Quota: 1,157 Turnout: 28.10%

=== 2011 by-election ===
On 17 November 2011 a by-election was held following the death of SNP councillor George Roberts. The seat was held by the SNP's Ken Andrew.

Hillhead by-election (17 November 2011) - 1 seat
Party	Candidate	FPv%	Count						
Party	Candidate	FPv%	1	2	3	4	5	6	7
SNP	Ken Andrew	32.75	1,026	1,027	1,030	1,079	1,174	1,386	1,851
Labour	Martin McElroy	30.17	945	946	950	992	1,057	1,276	
Green	Stuart Leckie	13.88	435	436	441	556	639		
Conservative	Maya Forrest	11.87	372	374	384	441			
Liberal Democrats	Ewan Hoyle	9.80	307	310	311				
UKIP	Neil Craig	1.14	36	37					
Britannica Party	Charles Baillie	0.35	11						
Electorate: 23,243 Valid: 3,132 Spoilt: 40 Quota: 1,567 Turnout: 3,172 (13.65%)

=== 2007 election ===
2007 Council election: Hillhead
Party	Candidate	FPv%	Count							
Party	Candidate	FPv%	1	2	3	4	5	6	7	8
SNP	George A Roberts	21.14	1,899							
Green	Martha Ferguson Wardrop	18.64	1,675	1,705	1,709	1,778	1,924			
Liberal Democrats	Kenneth Elder	13.18	1,184	1,193	1,196	1,214	1,245	1,276	1,562	1,926
Labour	Hanzala Malik (Note: Outgoing councillor for Woodlands single-member ward.)	13.27	1,192	1,196	1,197	1,203	1,267	1,277	1,379	1,433
Labour	Martin Rhodes	12.02	1,080	1,085	1,088	1,092	1,114	1,125	1,160	1,288
Conservative	John Anderson	10.15	912	918	930	932	941	945	974	
Liberal Democrats	Abdul A Khan	5.15	463	469	477	490	526	554		
Solidarity	Akhter Khan	3.83	344	354	362	411				
Scottish Socialist	Anthea Irwin	2.05	184	187	194					
Independent	Neil Craig	0.57	51	51						
Electorate: 20,826 Valid: 8,984 Spoilt: 144 Quota: 1,797 Turnout: 43.84%

== See also ==
- Wards of Glasgow
