= Jon Molyneux =

Scottish politician

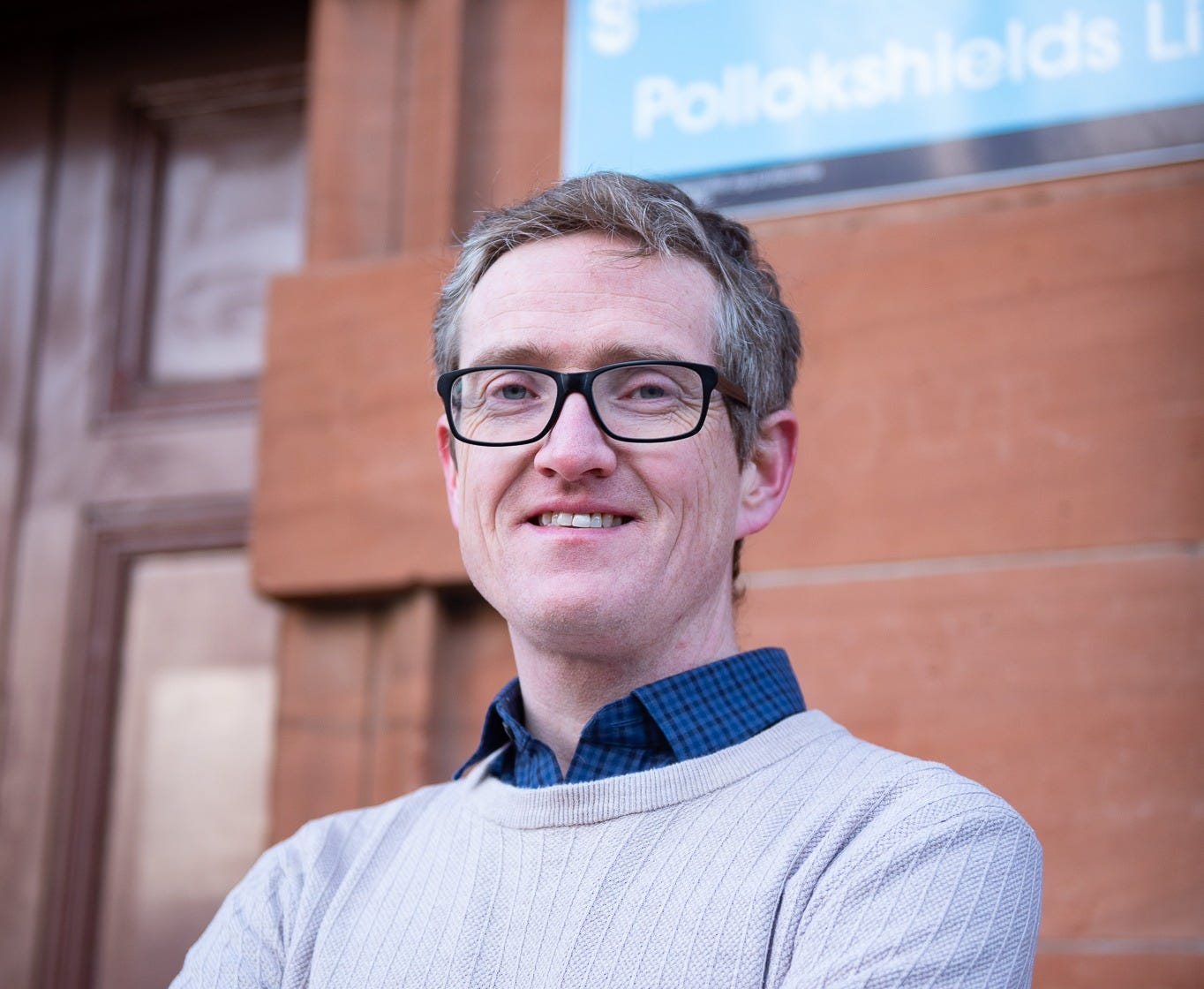
- Molyneux at Pollokshields Library

Councillor for Pollokshields
- Incumbent
- Assumed office 2017

Personal details
- Party: Scottish Greens

Jon Molyneux is a Scottish politician and councillor in Glasgow, representing the Scottish Greens. He has served on Glasgow City Council since 2017, representing the Pollokshields ward.

== Political career ==
Molyneux was elected as a councillor to Glasgow City Council in the 2017 local elections.

Following the 2022 local elections, he was appointed to a number of council committees and external bodies.

He was involved in negotiations leading to an agreement between the Scottish National Party and the Scottish Greens on the 2026–27 council budget.

== Council roles and appointments ==
Molyneux has served as a member of several committees of Glasgow City Council, including:

- City Administration Committee
- Emergency Committee
- Senior Officer Workforce Committee

He has also held roles on associated bodies, including:

- Glasgow City Integration Joint Board
- Pollokshields Area Partnership

In addition, he has represented the council on external organisations, including:

- COSLA Convention (appointed 19 May 2022)
- Hidden Gardens Trust (appointed 23 June 2022)
- Glasgow Building Preservation Trust (appointed 11 December 2025)

== Policy and public positions ==
=== Fireworks regulation and civic events ===
Molyneux has supported stricter regulation of fireworks.

He has also contributed to discussions on the potential return of publicly funded civic fireworks displays.

=== Culture and music scene ===
He has advocated for Glasgow's music scene and the protection of cultural venues, including the Sub Club.

=== Public commentary and freedom of expression ===
Molyneux has commented on public controversy surrounding the Irish hip-hop group Kneecap, opposing calls for the group to be removed from the TRNSMT music festival, and brought a motion to Glasgow City Council relating to the issue.

== Writing and media ==
Molyneux was a regular columnist for the Glasgow Times.

== Community activity ==
Molyneux has participated in charity fundraising initiatives including “The Glasgow Way” walk.
