= Linn (ward) =

Electoral ward in Glasgow, Scotland

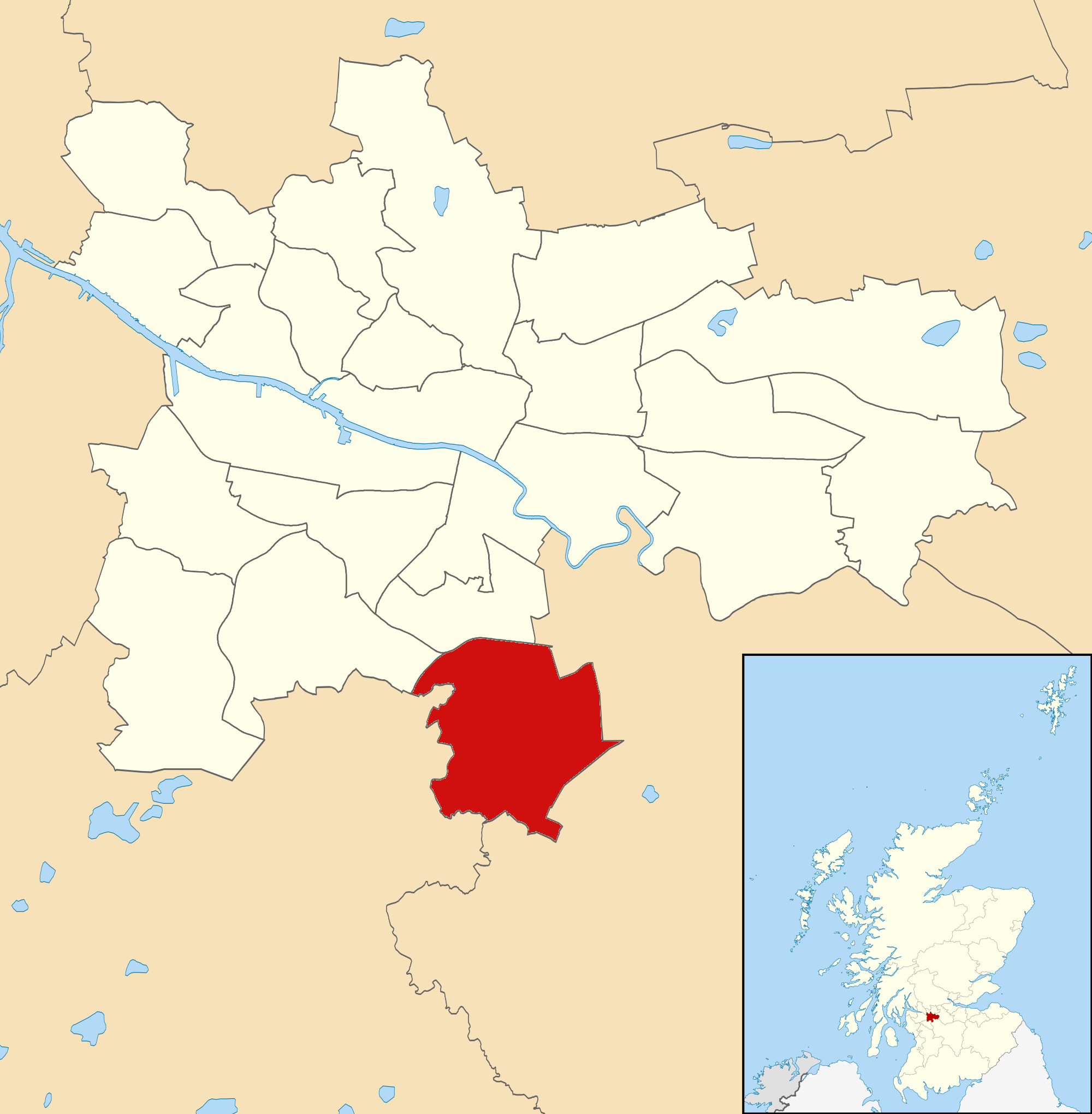
- Linn Ward (2017) within Glasgow

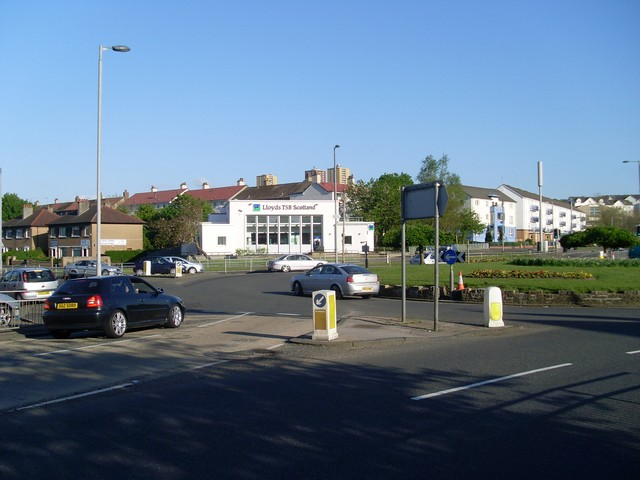
- Croftfoot roundabout looking south towards Castlemilk
- Area: 4.3 sq mi (11 km^{2})
- Population: 29,575 (2015)
  - Density: 6,877.9/sq mi (2,655.6/km^{2})
- Council area: Glasgow City Council
- Lieutenancy area: Glasgow
- Country: Scotland
- Sovereign state: United Kingdom
- Post town: GLASGOW
- Postcode district: G44, G45, G76
- Dialling code: 0141
- Police: Scotland
- Fire: Scottish
- Ambulance: Scottish

Linn (Ward 1) is one of the 23 wards of Glasgow City Council. There are 4 councillors for the area; as of 19 November 2022, it is represented by the Scottish National Party and Scottish Labour, who have two councillors each.

== History ==
In September 2022, Councillor Malcolm Cunning died. A by-election was called for 17 November.

== Boundaries ==
The southernmost ward of Glasgow, Linn includes the areas of Castlemilk, Croftfoot and Simshill, those parts of Cathcart, King's Park and Muirend that are south and east of the Cathcart Circle Lines, and the separate village of Carmunnock. The ward also contains Linn Park and the Cathkin Braes. The boundaries have remained unchanged since the creation of the ward in 2007.

== Demographics ==
According to the 2011 census, the ethnicity of the population is:

| Ethnicity | Proportion |
|---|---|
| White Scottish/British | 90.59% |
| White Irish | 2.82% |
| Other White | 1.96% |
| Mixed Ethnic Groups | 0.23% |
| Indian | 0.48% |
| Pakistani | 2.03% |
| Bangladeshi | 0.02% |
| Chinese | 0.36% |
| Other Asian | 0.22% |
| African | 0.93% |
| Caribbean or Black | 0.17% |
| Other Ethnic Group | 0.18% |

== Councillors ==
| Election | Councillors | | | |
|---|---|---|---|---|
| 2007 | David Ritchie (SNP) | Sadie Docherty (Labour) | John McKenzie (Labour) | Margot Clark (Liberal Democrats) |
| 2012 | Glenn Elder (SNP) | Sadie Docherty (Labour) | Malcolm Cunning (Labour) | Margot Clark (Liberal Democrats) |
| 2017 | Glenn Elder (SNP) | Margaret Morgan (SNP) | Malcolm Cunning (Labour) | Euan Blockley (Conservative) |
| 2022 | Paul McCabe (SNP) | Margaret Morgan (SNP) | Malcolm Cunning (Labour) | Catherine Vallis (Labour) |
| 2022 | Paul McCabe (SNP) | Margaret Morgan (SNP) | John Carson (Labour) | Catherine Vallis (Labour) |

== Election results ==
=== 2022 by-election ===
A by-election was held on 17 November 2022 to replace Malcolm Cunning.

Linn by-election (17 November 2022) − 1 seat
| Party | Candidate | FPv% | Count | | | | | | | |
| Party | Candidate | FPv% | 1 | 2 | 3 | 4 | 5 | 6 | 7 | 8 |
|---|---|---|---|---|---|---|---|---|---|---|
| Labour | John Carson | 43.4 | 2,227 | 2,227 | 2,227 | 2,239 | 2,256 | 2,381 | 2,524 | 2,674 |
| SNP | Chris Lang-Tait | 33.2 | 1,702 | 1,703 | 1,703 | 1,716 | 1,750 | 1,777 | 1,789 | 2,046 |
| Green | Jen Bell | 8.0 | 409 | 409 | 410 | 419 | 433 | 482 | 503 | |
| Conservative | Pauline Sutherland | 6.4 | 327 | 329 | 332 | 332 | 335 | 374 | | |
| Liberal Democrats | Joe McCauley | 5.7 | 294 | 299 | 299 | 301 | 304 | | | |
| Alba | Kirsty Fraser | 1.8 | 90 | 90 | 91 | 97 | | | | |
| Scottish Socialist | George Willis MacDougall | 0.9 | 46 | 49 | 52 | | | | | |
| UKIP | Christopher Ho | 0.4 | 19 | 20 | | | | | | |
| Freedom Alliance (UK) | Diane McMillan | 0.4 | 18 | | | | | | | |
Electorate: 22,340 Valid: 5,132 Spoilt: 73 Quota: 2,567 Turnout: 23.3%

=== 2022 election ===
2022 Glasgow City Council election

Linn – 4 seats
| Party | Candidate | FPv% | Count | | | | | | | | |
| Party | Candidate | FPv% | 1 | 2 | 3 | 4 | 5 | 6 | 7 | 8 | 9 |
|---|---|---|---|---|---|---|---|---|---|---|---|
| Labour | Malcolm Cunning (incumbent) | 23.9 | 2,152 | | | | | | | | |
| SNP | Paul McCabe | 21.5 | 1,934 | | | | | | | | |
| SNP | Margaret Morgan (incumbent) | 11.9 | 1,070 | 1,084 | 1,193 | 1,222 | 1,542 | 1,643 | 1,985 | | |
| Conservative | Euan Blockley (incumbent) | 11.5 | 1,035 | 1,063 | 1,063 | 1,074 | 1,080 | 1,199 | 1,255 | 1,259 | |
| Independent | James Toner | 9.4 | 849 | 863 | 867 | 893 | 935 | 997 | | | |
| Labour | Catherine Vallis | 8.0 | 724 | 943 | 945 | 952 | 1,031 | 1,222 | 1,421 | 1,480 | 1,940 |
| Liberal Democrats | Joe McCauley | 6.4 | 572 | 606 | 610 | 619 | 691 | | | | |
| Green | Keith Warwick | 6.0 | 544 | 552 | 559 | 577 | | | | | |
| Alba | Angela Jones | 1.3 | 114 | 119 | 121 | | | | | | |
Electorate: 22,308 Valid: 8,994 Spoilt: 200 Quota: 1,799 Turnout: 41.2%

=== 2017 election ===
2017 Glasgow City Council election

Linn – 4 seats
| Party | Candidate | FPv% | Count | | | | | | | | | | |
| Party | Candidate | FPv% | 1 | 2 | 3 | 4 | 5 | 6 | 7 | 8 | 9 | 10 | 11 |
|---|---|---|---|---|---|---|---|---|---|---|---|---|---|
| SNP | Glenn Elder (incumbent)†† | 18.70% | 1,646 | 1,648 | 1,655 | 1,655 | 1,720 | 1,864 | | | | | |
| SNP | Margaret Morgan | 11.72% | 1,032 | 1,032 | 1,037 | 1,040 | 1,105 | 1,357 | 1,439 | 1,532 | 1,802 | | |
| Labour | Malcolm Cunning (incumbent) | 15.32% | 1,348 | 1,357 | 1,365 | 1,370 | 1,400 | 1,415 | 1,417 | 1,558 | 1,655 | 1,661 | 2,646 |
| Conservative | Euan Blockley | 15.85% | 1,395 | 1,410 | 1,411 | 1,415 | 1,426 | 1,429 | 1,429 | 1,580 | 1,613 | 1,613 | 1,657 |
| Labour | Alan Stewart | 11.69% | 1,029 | 1,034 | 1,039 | 1,047 | 1,070 | 1,078 | 1,080 | 1,173 | 1,279 | 1,285 | |
| Independent | Cathy Milligan | 8.45% | 744 | 752 | 768 | 797 | 845 | 866 | 874 | 937 | | | |
| Liberal Democrats | Margot Clark (incumbent) | 7.68% | 676 | 676 | 678 | 685 | 707 | 714 | 716 | | | | |
| SNP | Paul Leinster | 5.09% | 448 | 448 | 448 | 450 | 466 | | | | | | |
| Green | Alan Digney | 3.27% | 288 | 293 | 303 | 310 | | | | | | | |
| Independent | Bobby Pollock | 0.78% | 69 | 72 | 74 | | | | | | | | |
| Solidarity | Max Brodie | 0.76% | 67 | 70 | | | | | | | | | |
| UKIP | John Cowan | 0.66% | 58 | | | | | | | | | | |
Electorate: 22,310 Valid: 8,800 Spoilt: 259 Quota: 1,761 Turnout: 40.6%

=== 2012 election ===
2012 Glasgow City Council election

Linn – 4 seats
| Party | Candidate | FPv% | Count | | | | | | | |
| Party | Candidate | FPv% | 1 | 2 | 3 | 4 | 5 | 6 | 7 | 8 |
|---|---|---|---|---|---|---|---|---|---|---|
| Labour | Malcolm Cunning | 25.14% | 1,858 | | | | | | | |
| Labour | Sadie Docherty (incumbent) | 20.90% | 1,545 | | | | | | | |
| SNP | Glenn Elder | 20.01% | 1,479 | | | | | | | |
| Liberal Democrats | Margot Clark (incumbent) | 12.09% | 894 | 938 | 949 | 961 | 970 | 1,026 | 1,300 | 1,548 |
| SNP | Stewart McDonald | 9.43% | 697 | 736 | 742 | 751 | 778 | 851 | 900 | |
| Conservative | Andrew Morrison | 7.03% | 520 | 533 | 534 | 539 | 546 | 569 | | |
| Green | Lisa Jones | 2.73% | 202 | 229 | 234 | 261 | 315 | | | |
| TUSC | Frank Young | 1.61% | 119 | 138 | 142 | 166 | | | | |
| Glasgow First | Lesley Ingram | 1.06% | 78 | 111 | 116 | | | | | |
Electorate: 22,192 Valid: 7,392 Spoilt: 169 Quota: 1,479 Turnout: 34.07%

=== 2007 election ===
2007 Glasgow City Council election

2007 Council election: Linn (4 members)
| Party | Candidate | FPv% | Count | | | | | | | |
| Party | Candidate | FPv% | 1 | 2 | 3 | 4 | 5 | 6 | 7 | 8 |
|---|---|---|---|---|---|---|---|---|---|---|
| SNP | David Ritchie | 21.35 | 2,043 | | | | | | | |
| Labour | Sadie Docherty | 18.63 | 1,782 | 1,789 | 1,798 | 1,807 | 1,826 | 1,849 | 1,896 | 1,947 |
| Liberal Democrats | Margot Clark | 13.42 | 1,284 | 1,302 | 1,311 | 1,318 | 1,350 | 1,458 | 1,532 | 1,866 |
| Labour | John McKenzie (Note: Outgoing councillor for Castlemilk single-member ward.) | 14.44 | 1,381 | 1,389 | 1,395 | 1,417 | 1,433 | 1,459 | 1,514 | 1,530 |
| Labour | Allan Stewart | 9.98 | 955 | 961 | 970 | 980 | 990 | 1,001 | 1,078 | 1,105 |
| Conservative | Esme H Clark | 9.39 | 898 | 905 | 906 | 961 | 991 | 1,005 | 1,015 | |
| Solidarity | Frank Young | 4.13 | 395 | 409 | 469 | 478 | 498 | | | |
| Green | Chloe Helen Stewart | 3.09 | 296 | 310 | 328 | 338 | 359 | | | |
| Independent | Chris Lang | 2.29 | 219 | 224 | 229 | 239 | | | | |
| Scottish Unionist | Harry McArthur | 1.72 | 165 | 166 | 170 | | | | | |
| Scottish Socialist | Gordon Thomson | 1.56 | 149 | 156 | | | | | | |
Electorate: 21,624 Valid: 9,567 Spoilt: 217 Quota: 1,914 Turnout: 45.25%

== See also ==
- Wards of Glasgow
