= Martha Wardrop =

Scottish politician (born 1969)

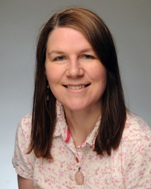
Cllr Martha Wardrop

Bailie Martha Wardrop is a Scottish Green politician. She is a Glasgow city councillor, first elected in the Hillhead ward in 2007 and subsequently re-elected in 2012, 2017 and 2022.

She was born in St Andrews, grew up in Fife and has lived in Glasgow since moving there as a student in 1988.

Between 2011 and 2013, she was joint convenor of the party.

== Awards and honours ==
In 2015, she jointly won 'politician of the year' at RSPB's Nature of Scotland Awards.

Party political offices
| Preceded by Eleanor Scott | Co-Convenor of the Scottish Greens; 2011–2013; With: Patrick Harvie | Succeeded by Maggie Chapman |
