= Hanzala Malik =

Scottish politician (1956–2023)

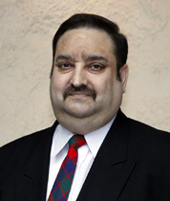
- Malik in 2011

Deputy Convener of the European and External Relations Committee
- In office 14 June 2011 – 24 March 2016
- Convener: Christina McKelvie
- Preceded by: Sandra White
- Succeeded by: Lewis MacDonald

Member of the Scottish Parliament for Glasgow (1 of 7 Regional MSPs)
- In office 5 May 2011 – 24 March 2016

Personal details
- Born: 26 November 1956 Glasgow, Scotland
- Died: December 2023 (aged 67) Glasgow, Scotland
- Party: Scottish Labour Party
- Education: University of Paisley

Hanzala Shaheed Malik (26 November 1956 – December 2023) was a Scottish Labour Party politician. He was a Member of the Scottish Parliament (MSP) for the Glasgow region from 2011 until 2016.

== Early life and career ==
Born in Glasgow to a Pakistani father and a Scottish mother on 26 November 1956, Malik gained a BSc degree in Computing with Business Administration from the University of Paisley. Before working in politics, he worked in both the private and public sector including serving as a police special constable and member of the Territorial Army.

== Political career ==
Malik was a Glasgow City Councillor for the one-member ward of Hillhead from 1995 to 2007, then as one of four in the larger multi-member of the same name from 2007 to 2012. In his role as a councillor, Malik was a member of council committees which included Education, Development and Regeneration, Finance, Housing, Licensing, Policy and Resources.

Malik was elected as a Labour MSP for the Glasgow region in the 2011 Scottish Parliament election (he declined to vacate his council seat until elections the following year, despite a by-election already being arranged for the ward after the death of another councillor). He was eleventh on Labour's regional list at the election in May 2016 and was not re-elected. He was re-elected as a Glasgow City councillor, again for Hillhead, in May 2017.

Malik endorsed Anas Sarwar in the 2021 Scottish Labour leadership election.

== Personal life and death ==
Malik was mixed-race; his father was born in Pakistan and his mother was born in Scotland. He had been married for over forty years and had two children and two grandchildren.

Hanzala Malik died in December 2023, at the age of 67.
