= Pollokshields (ward) =

Electoral ward in Glasgow, Scotland

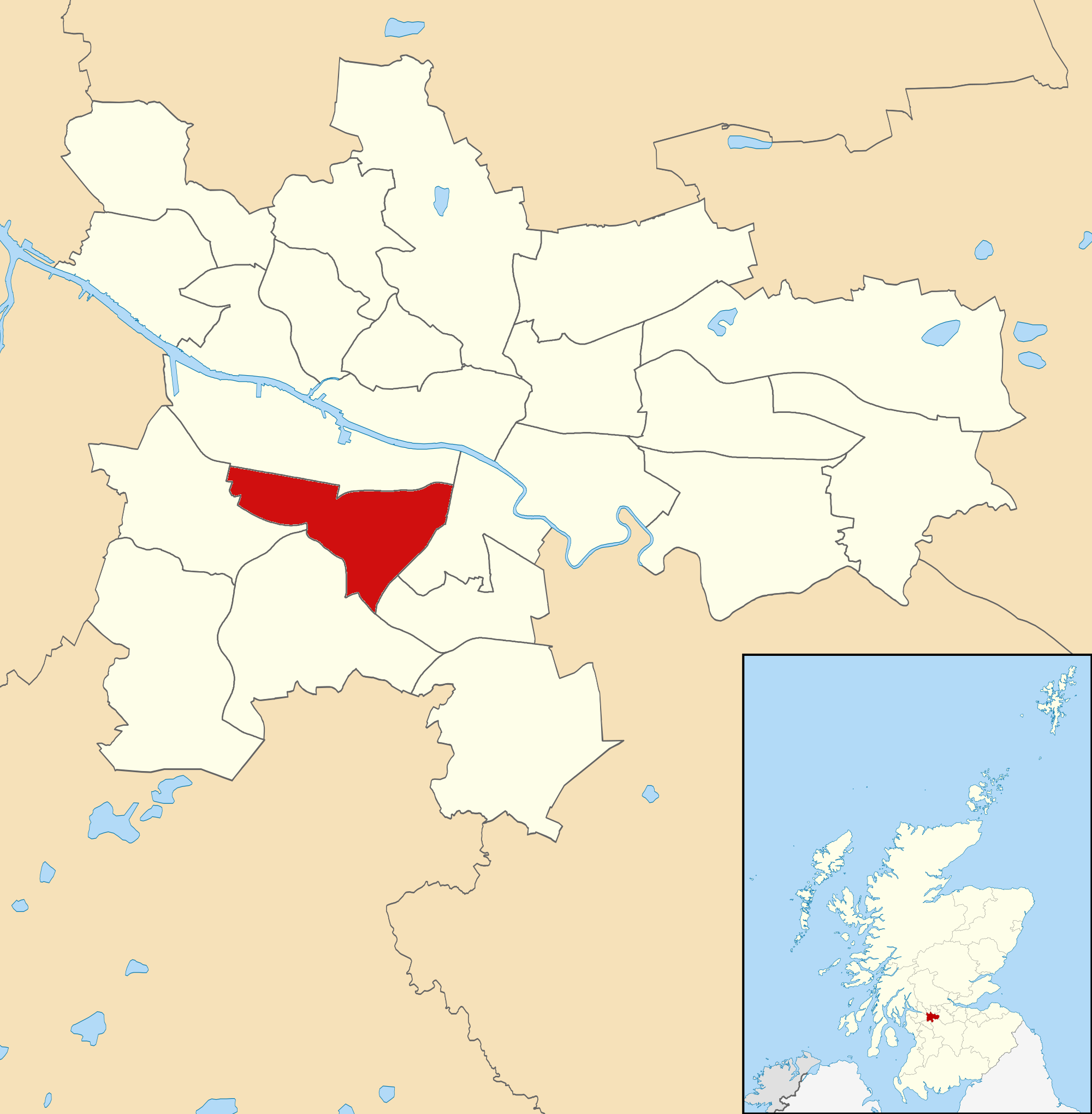
- Pollokshields Ward (2017) within Glasgow

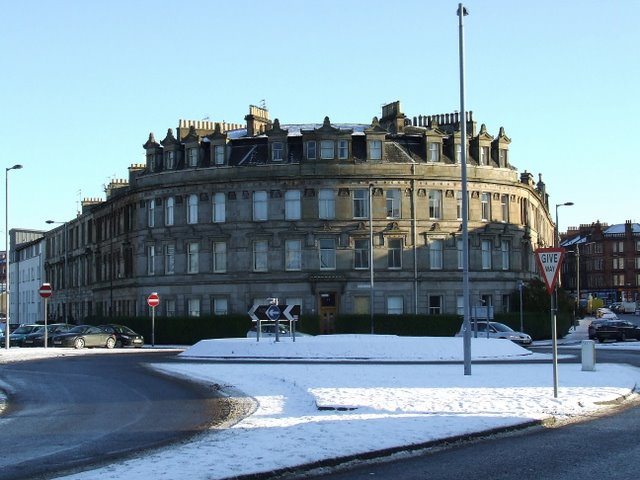
- Tenements on the corner of Nithsdale Road and Nithsdale Drive in the Pollokshields ward.
- Area: 6.29 km^{2} (2.43 sq mi)
- Population: 28,266 (2019)
  - Density: 4,448.8/km^{2} (11,522/sq mi)
- Council area: Glasgow City Council
- Lieutenancy area: Glasgow
- Country: Scotland
- Sovereign state: United Kingdom
- Post town: GLASGOW
- Postcode district: G41, G43, G51
- Dialling code: 0141
- Police: Scotland
- Fire: Scottish
- Ambulance: Scottish

Pollokshields (Ward 6) is one of the 23 wards of Glasgow City Council. On its creation in 2007 and in 2012 it returned three council members, using the single transferable vote system. For the 2017 Glasgow City Council election, the boundaries were changed, the ward increased in size and returned four members.

== Boundaries ==
Located on the South Side of Glasgow, the ward includes Pollokshields itself as well as Crossmyloof, Strathbungo and the western part of Shawlands. The 2017 expansion took in Bellahouston, Craigton and Dumbreck from the Govan ward.

The ethnic makeup of the expanded Pollokshields ward using the 2011 census population statistics was:

- 69.3% White Scottish / British / Irish / Other
- 26.9% Asian (Mainly Pakistani)
- 2% Black (Mainly African)
- 1.6% Mixed / Other Ethnic Group

This makes it one of the most ethnically diverse wards in Glasgow.

== Councillors ==
Election	Councillors			
2007	David Meikle (Conservative)	Irfan Rabbani (Labour)	Khalil-ur Rahman Malik (SNP)	3 seats
2012	David Meikle (Conservative)	Hanif Raja (Labour)	Norman MacLeod (SNP)	3 seats
2017	David Meikle (Conservative)	Hanif Raja (Labour)	Norman MacLeod (SNP)	Jon Molyneux (Green)
2022	Zen Ghani (SNP)	Hanif Raja (Labour)	Norman MacLeod (SNP)	Jon Molyneux (Green)

== Election results ==
=== 2022 election ===
2022 Glasgow City Council election

Pollokshields – 4 seats
Party	Candidate	FPv%	Count									
Party	Candidate	FPv%	1	2	3	4	5	6	7	8	9	10
Green	Jon Molyneux (incumbent)	22.1	2,290									
SNP	Zen Ghani	16.9	1,755	1,824	1,843	1,864	1,945	2,044	2,097			
Labour	Hanif Raja (incumbent)	16.5	1,709	1,730	1,738	1,798	1,869	1,948	2,541			
SNP	Norman MacLeod (incumbent)	13.6	1,412	1,451	1,462	1,482	1,518	1,596	1,653	1,727	1,746	1,914
Conservative	David Meikle (incumbent)	12.5	1,299	1,301	1,302	1,364	1,372	1,433	1,491	1,570	1,570	
Labour	Fariha Thomas	6.9	712	726	745	797	822	897				
Volt	Ewan Hoyle	4.1	421	451	461	511	528					
Alba	Muhammad Shoaib	3.5	367	368	375	375						
Liberal Democrats	Carole Louise Ford	3.0	309	320	322							
TUSC	Tom Ruddell	0.8	88	101								
Electorate: 21,978 Valid: 10,362 Spoilt: 189 Quota: 2,073 Turnout: 48.0%

=== 2017 election ===
2017 Glasgow City Council election

Pollokshields – 4 seats
Party	Candidate	FPv%	Count							
Party	Candidate	FPv%	1	2	3	4	5	6	7	8
SNP	Norman MacLeod (incumbent)	24.34%	2,504							
Conservative	David Meikle (incumbent)	23.04%	2,370							
Labour	Hanif Raja (incumbent)	15.09%	1,552	1,570	1,607	1,621	1,700	2,378		
Green	Jon Molyneux	13.59%	1,399	1,461	1,482	1,497	1,645	1,727	1,786	2,760
SNP	Nighet Riaz	11.88%	1,222	1,542	1,549	1,556	1,569	1,617	1,684	
Labour	Fariha Thomas (incumbent) *	8.17%	841	848	878	890	954			
Liberal Democrats	Ewan Hoyle	2.94%	302	311	382	413				
UKIP	Iain Cameron	0.95%	98	100	132					
Electorate: 21,700 Valid: 10,288 Spoilt: 261 Quota: 2,058 Turnout: 48.6%

* = Sitting Councillor for Govan ward.

=== 2012 election ===
2012 Glasgow City Council election

Pollokshields – 3 seats
Party	Candidate	FPv%	Count						
Party	Candidate	FPv%	1	2	3	4	5	6	7
Labour	Hanif Raja	24.19%	1,828	1,837	1,854	1,897			
SNP	Norman MacLeod	21.92%	1,657	1,662	1,671	1,702	1,703	1,865	3,181
Conservative	David Meikle (incumbent)	22.15%	1,674	1,682	1,683	1,730	1,731	1,832	1,878
SNP	Khalil Malik (incumbent)	19.01%	1,437	1,439	1,455	1,466	1,467	1,613	
Green	Patrick McAleer	8.04%	608	614	652	707	709		
Liberal Democrats	Bill Fraser	2.91%	220	224	224				
TUSC	Akhtar Khan	1.20%	91	94					
Glasgow First	Andrina Morrison	0.57%	43						
Electorate: 18,117 Valid: 7,558 Spoilt: 178 Quota: 1,890 Turnout: 42.70%

=== 2007 election ===
2007 Glasgow City Council election

2007 Council election: Pollokshields (3 members)
Party	Candidate	FPv%	Count							
Party	Candidate	FPv%	1	2	3	4	5	6	7	8
Labour	Irfan Rabbani†††††	26.92	2,575							
SNP	Khalil-ur Rahman Malik	21.50	2,057	2,082	2,123	2,256	2,309	2,624		
Conservative	David Meikle	15.00	1,435	1,445	1,452	1,460	1,593	1,610	1,632	1,839
Green	Ian Ruffell	10.90	1,043	1,060	1,096	1,206	1,280	1,321	1,374	1,835
Liberal Democrats	Isobel Nelson	9.02	863	883	893	918	1,001	1,030	1,070	
Independent	Muhammad Shoaib	6.19	592	605	611	633	656			
Independent	Karin Currie	4.58	438	441	453	472				
Solidarity	Fatima Uygun	3.97	380	388	418					
Scottish Socialist	Ali Ashraf	1.92	184	188						
Electorate: 17,029 Valid: 9,567 Spoilt: 149 Quota: 2,392 Turnout: 57.07%

== See also ==
- Wards of Glasgow
