= Independent Green Voice =

- Founder: Alistair McConnachie
- Leader: Alistair McConnachie
- Founded: March 2003
- Registered: 14 March 2003
- Headquarters: c/o Clyde Offices; 2nd Floor; 48 West George Street; Glasgow; Scotland; G2 1BP
- Ideology: Ultranationalism; Scottish unionism; British unionism; Euroscepticism
- Political position: Right-wing to far-right
- Colours: Black and white
- Slogan: Organic Green Voice (2026); Organic, Local, Democratic (2021)
- Scottish Parliament: 0 / 129
- Local government in Scotland: 0 / 1,227

Website
- www.igv.family

Independent Green Voice (IGV) is a minor right-wing to far-right political party in Scotland. Founded by Alistair McConnachie, it was registered with the Electoral Commission in March 2003.

The party's performances at the 2021 and 2026 Scottish Parliament election were strong enough to trigger suggestions that voters may have confused IGV with the Scottish Greens and voted for IGV in error. It was speculated this could have cost the Scottish Greens two seats in the Scottish Parliament in 2021, and at least one in 2026.

== Overview ==
=== Background ===
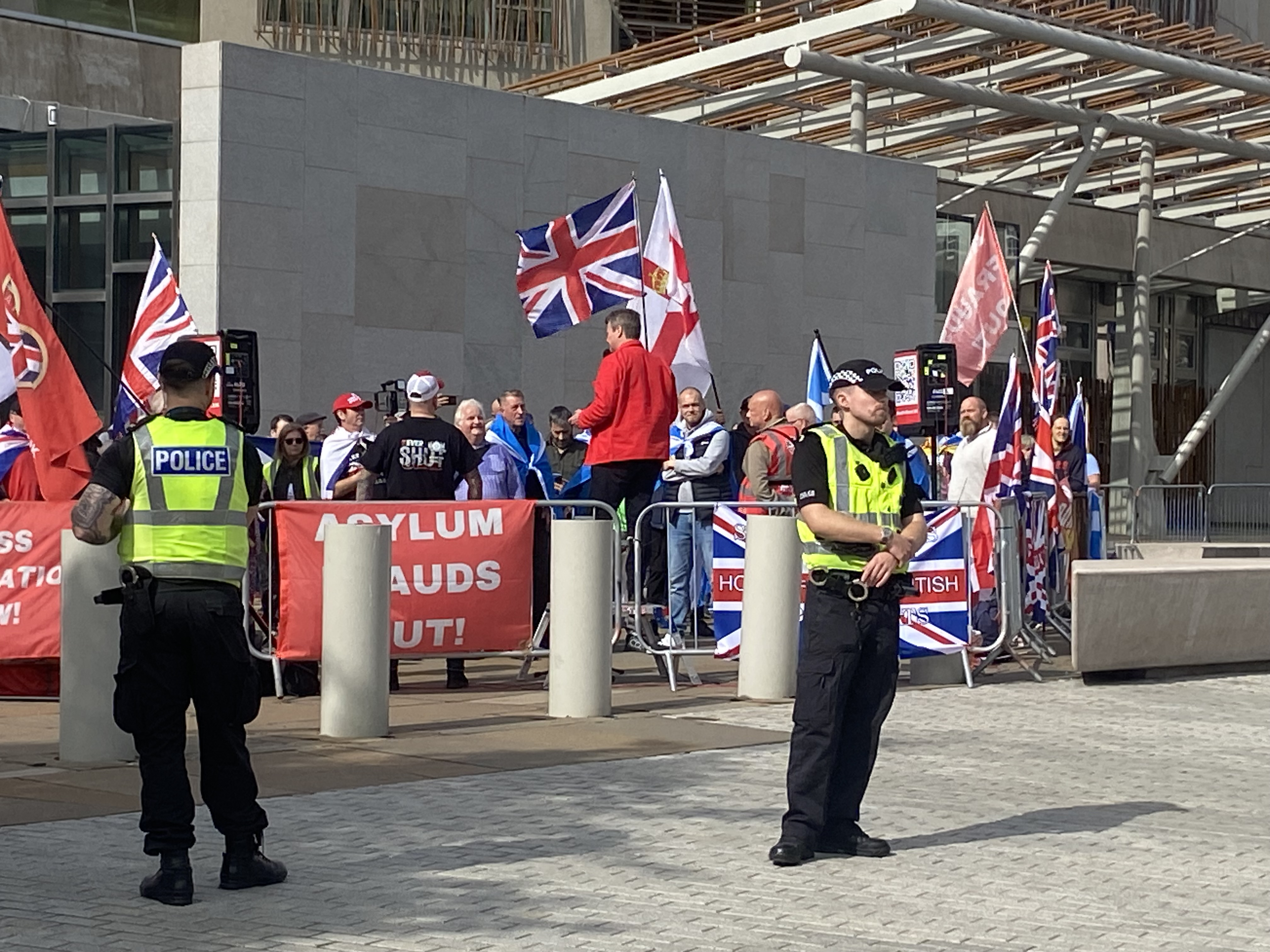
McConnachie (in red jacket) speaking at an anti-immigration protest in September 2025

Independent Green Voice was founded by Alistair McConnachie, a far-right activist and former Scottish organiser for the UK Independence Party (UKIP). UKIP refused to renew his membership for questioning the Holocaust. In 2012, McConnachie founded a pro-Union group called 'A Force for Good'. Two candidates, Max Dunbar and John Robertson, were former British National Party (BNP) activists, who stood in the South Scotland and Central Scotland regional list constituencies for Independent Green Voice in 2021 respectively. Dunbar is a former treasurer of the BNP's Scotland branch.

=== 2021 Scottish Parliament election ===
On 23 March 2021, the party registered a new emblem with the Electoral Commission that consists of an image of a leaf and the words "Independent Green Voice" in capital letters, with "Green" being in a larger font than "Independent" or "Voice". Following the results of the 2021 Scottish Parliament election and the party's surprise performance, there were suggestions that voters may have confused IGV with the Scottish Greens and voted for IGV in error.

The Scottish Greens were 1,000 votes short of gaining a list seat in Glasgow (where IGV received 2,210 votes) and 100 votes short of gaining one in South Scotland (where IGV received 1,690 votes).

The Scottish Greens reported that they had complained to the Electoral Commission about the name when IGV was first registered, although reports note they did not raise concerns about the emblem prior to the election.

On 22 May 2021, the Electoral Commission ruled out a review of the name or emblem, stating "No concerns were raised with us in relation to this application to add an emblem to a long-registered party. We are satisfied that there are clear and sufficient differences between the two party's registered names, descriptions and emblems to avoid confusion."

It was disclosed in 2026 that the Commission's then-CEO, Bob Posner, raised concerns internally about whether IGV's identification could be perceived to pose a risk of confusing voters, and—following the results of 2021 election—questioned if an "internal prompt objective review" of the party's registration should take place. It was reported that this view was objected to by other senior officials within the organisation—one of which deemed the issue a 'borderline case'—with Posner separately expressing that the similarity of the emblems "does not mean that voters were actually confused or misled."

=== 2024 Hillhead by-election ===
The party stood in a by-election in Hillhead, a ward of Glasgow City Council, in April 2024, with the Scottish Greens stating IGV was "masquerading as a green voice". Ballot Box Scotland's Allan Faulds stated that the dynamics of the ranked-choice voting system in place would prevent any attempts by IGV from stymieing the Greens' chances in the seat, as "any genuinely confused voters" would be likely to rank the IGV first and Greens second, and that "since IGV will drop out very early on that is to all intents and purposes as good as" ranking the Greens first regardless. The by-election was won by the Green candidate after seven counts of preference flows, with the IGV present in the first three counts and registering enough votes in each to prevent the Green candidate from ranking first in those.

=== 2026 Scottish Parliament election ===
The party registered an improved number of votes and higher vote share at the 2026 election, concurrent to an also greater share of the vote—and seat count—for the official Scottish Greens. Theoretical analysis by The National suggested that the party was strong enough in the Mid Scotland and Fife regional constituency to prevent the Scottish Greens from achieving a second list seat in that region, which instead was awarded to the Scottish Conservatives candidate Stephen Kerr. Prior to the election, Scottish Greens co-leader Ross Greer spoke of the potential of IGV's presence on the ballot to mislead voters, which the party's intention to run their "biggest ever digital campaign" was partially attributable to. One of the party's six candidates in the 2026 Scottish Parliament election was ex-BNP candidate Max Dunbar.

The Scottish Greens subsequently demanded the resignation of Electoral Commission head Vijay Rangarajan over the affair. A Commission spokesperson reiterated the organisation's response in 2021, of "clear and sufficient differences" between the two parties' names and emblems, and that "[i]t is for voters to judge a party's manifesto and policy positions, not the Electoral Commission." Co-leader Gillian Mackay, in reaction to The National reporting of this and the 2021 internal correspondence about the issue, questioned if the organisation "genuinely believe[d] that a party with no manifesto, no campaigning presence and no media coverage legitimately won 20,000 votes across Scotland", and claimed the organisation's lack of action was "deeply insulting to the thousands of Scots who were effectively disenfranchised by a wrecking party led by a far right extremist."

== Ideology ==
The Independent Green Voice is a right-wing to far-right party. Ideologically, it is ultranationalist, unionist, and anti-immigration. The electoral slogans used by the party were "Democracy, Localism, Nature", "The Natural Alternative", and "Sustainability, Solidarity, Security". It postulates creating a Scottish debt commission and an annual civil liberties conference. It opposes immigration, and calls for a "Green Organic Scotland".

The party's leader, Alistair McConnachie, was previously a member of the UK Independence Party, but was expelled in 2001 for questioning the Holocaust. After founding the Independent Green Voice, McConnachie denied that he was a Holocaust denier and was now "prepared to accept that six million Jews perished" although he questioned "some aspects, specifically with regard to the existence of execution gas chambers". In the 2007 Scottish Parliament election, the party made an election pledge to "invite Iranian leaders, including President Ahmadinejad, to Scotland to dialogue with the Scottish people." The party was labelled a "front for fascists" by a Scottish Greens spokesperson after the 2021 election.

On its website, the party describes itself as "the authentic green party for ecology, localism, and democracy". It adheres to a political philosophy based on the thought of Carl Jung and oriented around "self-determination at a national, local and personal level". Independent Green Voice postulates "ecological awareness", "localised economics", "popular democracy", "energy independence", "food sovereignty", and "free speech". Economically, the party's key postulate is "Money Reform" which "identifies the creation of money as a debt, by the private banking system for its own private profit, as a key driver of ecologically destructive and unsustainable economic growth". As such, the party postulates a need to reform the "privately-created, debt-based money system".

== Electoral history ==
=== Scottish Parliament ===
Election	Constituency			Regional			Total seats	+/–	Rank	Government
Election	Votes	%	Seats	Votes	%	Seats	Total seats	+/–	Rank	Government
2003	1,300	0.1	0 / 73				0 / 129		20th	Not in parliament
2007				496	0.00	0 / 56	0 / 129		▼30th	Not in parliament
2021				9,756	0.36	0 / 56	0 / 129		▲9th	Not in parliament
2026				19,975	0.87	0 / 56	0 / 129		▲8th	Not in parliament
