= List of burghs in Scotland =

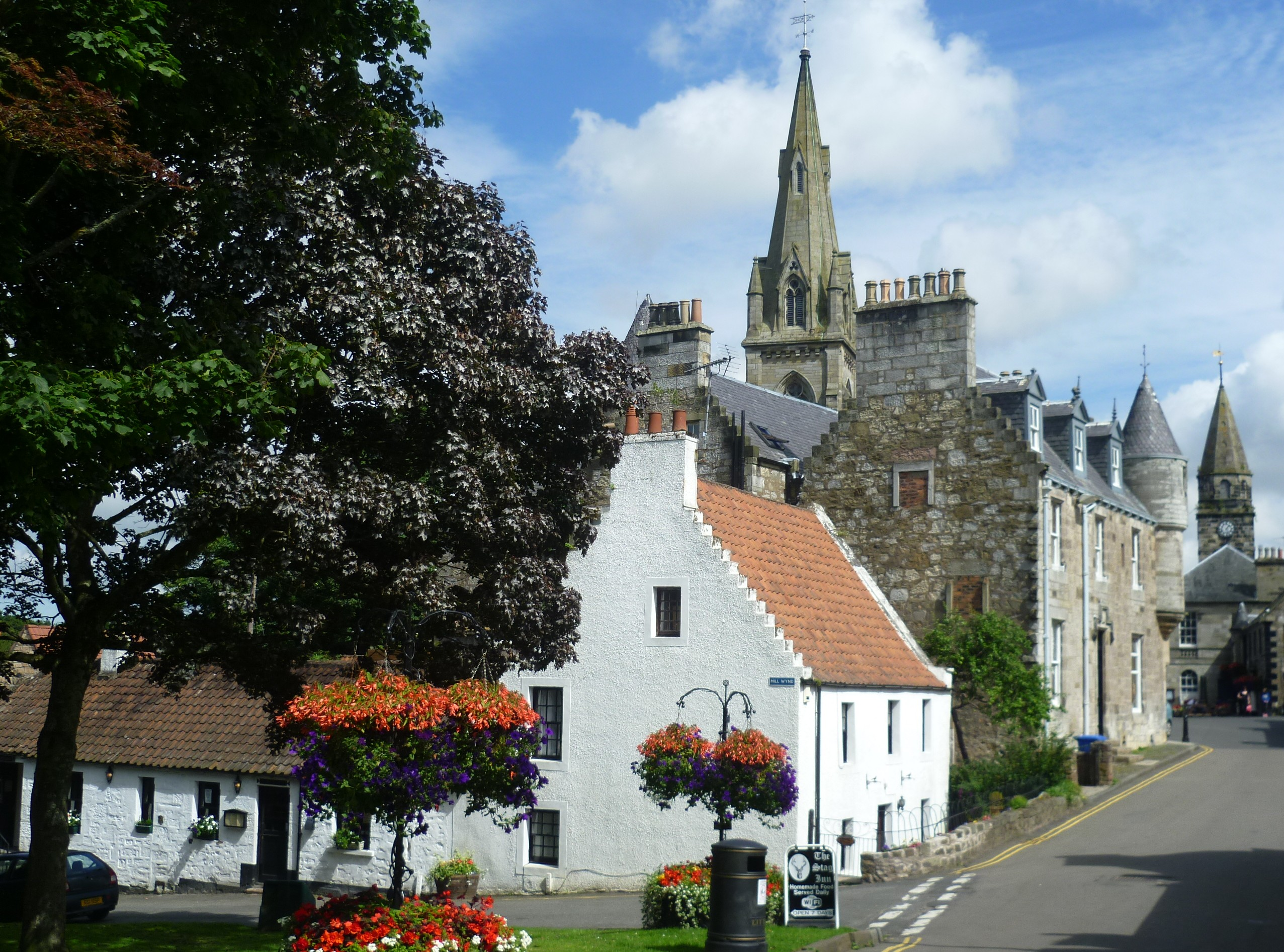
The small burgh of Falkland, Fife, created a royal burgh in 1458 and a police burgh in the 1890s

The following list includes all effective burghs in Scotland from the coming into force of the Burgh Police (Scotland) Act 1892 (55 & 56 Vict. c. 55), in 1893. "Ineffective" burghs, which had not used legislation to adopt a "police system", take on local government duties and reform their town councils, were abolished on this date.

Burgh (/ˈbʌrə/ BURR-ə) is the Scots term for a town or a municipality. It corresponds to the Scandinavian Borg and the English Borough.

Burghs are listed below under the name of the county to which they belonged. The county boundaries used are those effective for local government purposes from circa 1890 until 1975. During this period four burghs were also counties, or counties of cities in Scotland.

== Counties of cities ==
These four burghs were counties of cities, being independent from the surrounding counties for all judicial and local government purposes.

Burgh	Date of adoption of police system	Earlier burghal history	Post Union parliamentary burgh status
Aberdeen royal burgh (County of a City from 1899: previously straddled Aberdeenshire and Kincardineshire)	1862 ^{[note a]}	Royal burgh from 1124	One of the Aberdeen Burghs 1708 to 1832; Aberdeen burgh constituency 1832 to 1885
Dundee royal burgh (County of a city from 1894: previously in Forfarshire)	1837	Royal burgh from 1191–1195	One of the Perth Burghs 1708 to 1832; Dundee burgh constituency 1832 to 1950
Edinburgh royal burgh (County of a City from 13th century)	1805 (by Private Act)	Royal burgh from 1124–1127	Edinburgh burgh constituency 1708 to 1885
Glasgow royal burgh (County of a City from 1893: previously in Lanarkshire)	1800 (by Private Act)^{[note b]}	Royal burgh 1611	One of the Clyde Burghs 1708 to 1832; Glasgow burgh constituency 1832 to 1885

Note a: Royal Burgh of Aberdeen absorbed Aberdeenshire burghs of Old Aberdeen burgh (burgh of barony 1489, police burgh 1860), Woodside (police burgh 1860) in 1891.

Note b: Royal Burgh of Glasgow absorbed the following burghs in the years shown; all were within Renfrewshire unless otherwise noted:

- 1846: Gorbals (private act 1808; within Lanarkshire)
- 1891: Crosshill (police burgh 1871), Govanhill (police burgh 1876; within Lanarkshire), Hillhead (police burgh 1869; within Lanarkshire), Pollokshields (police burgh 1876), Pollokshields East (police burgh 1880)
- 1905: Kinning Park (police burgh 1871)
- 1912: Govan (burgh of barony 1607, police burgh 1864; within Lanarkshire until 1891), Partick (police burgh 1852; within Lanarkshire until 1891), Pollokshaws (burgh of barony 1813, police burgh 1858)

== Aberdeenshire ==
Note: The royal burgh of Aberdeen was part of this county until 1899.

Burgh	Date of adoption of police system	Earlier burghal history	Post Union parliamentary burgh status
Inverurie royal burgh	1867	Royal burgh 1558	One of the Elgin Burghs 1708 to 1918
Kintore royal burgh	1873	Royal burgh 1506-7	One of the Elgin Burghs 1708 to 1918
Ballater burgh	1891	None	None
Ellon burgh	1893	Burgh of barony 1707	None
Fraserburgh burgh	1840	Burgh of barony 1546; Burgh of regality 1601	None
Huntly burgh	1834	Burgh of barony 1488; Burgh of regality 1684	None
Old Meldrum	1893	Burgh of barony 1671	None
Peterhead burgh	1860	Burgh of barony 1587; Parliamentary burgh 1832	One of the Elgin Burghs 1832 to 1918
Rattray	N/A	Royal burgh 1563	None
Rosehearty	1892	Burgh of barony 1681	None
Turriff burgh	1858	Burgh of barony 1512	None

== Angus (also known as Forfarshire) ==
Note: The royal burgh of Dundee was part of this county until 1894.

Burgh	Date of adoption of police system	Earlier burghal history	Post Union parliamentary burgh status
Arbroath royal burgh	1836	Royal burgh 1599 [or perhaps 1555, when Johne Lyne was a commissioner for "Abirbrothok" at a convention of the royal burghs of Scotland.]	One of the Aberdeen Burghs 1708 to 1832 and of the Montrose Burghs 1832 to 1950
Brechin royal burgh	1893?	Royal burgh status ratified 1641	One of the Aberdeen Burghs 1708 to 1832 and of the Montrose Burghs 1832 to 1950
Forfar royal burgh	1857	Created royal burgh c 1123 - 62	One of the Perth Burghs 1708 to 1832 and of the Montrose Burghs 1832 to 1950
Montrose royal burgh	1833	Created royal burgh by c 1124 - 53	One of the Aberdeen Burghs 1708 to 1832 and of the Montrose Burghs 1832 to 1950
Broughty Ferry burgh - now part of Dundee	1864–1913 ‡	None	None
Carnoustie burgh	1889	None	None
Kirriemuir burgh	1834	Burgh of barony 1459; Burgh of regality 1670	None
Monifieth burgh	1895	None	None

‡ Absorbed by Dundee royal burgh 1913

== Argyll ==
Burgh	Date of adoption of police system	Earlier burghal history	Post Union parliamentary burgh status
Campbeltown royal burgh	1846	Royal burgh 1700; Previously burgh of barony 1667	One of the Ayr Burghs 1708 to 1832
Inveraray royal burgh	1833	Royal burgh 1648; Previously burgh of barony 1474	One of the Ayr Burghs 1708 to 1832
Dunoon burgh	1868	Burgh of barony 1835	None
Lochgilphead burgh	1858	None	None
Oban burgh	1862	Burgh of barony 1820; Parliamentary burgh 1832	One of the Ayr Burghs 1832 to 1918
Tobermory burgh	1875	None	None

== Ayrshire ==
Burgh	Date of adoption of police system	Earlier burghal history	Post Union parliamentary burgh status
Ayr royal burgh	1850	Created royal burgh c. 1203-6	One of the Ayr Burghs 1708 to 1950
Irvine royal burgh	1875	Royal burgh 1372	One of the Ayr Burghs 1708 to 1950
Ardrossan burgh	1865	Burgh of barony 1846	One of the Ayr Burghs 1918 to 1950
Cumnock and Holmhead burgh	1866	Cumnock created burgh of barony 1680	None
Darvel burgh	1873	None	None
Galston burgh	1864	None	None
Girvan burgh	1889	Burgh of barony 1668	None
Kilmarnock burgh	1847	Burgh of barony 1592; Parliamentary burgh 1832	One of the Kilmarnock Burghs 1832 to 1918
Kilwinning burgh	1889	None	None
Largs burgh	1876	Burgh of barony 1595 (as Newton of Gogo, re-erected as Largs 1629)	None
Maybole burgh	1857	Burgh of barony 1516	None
Newmilns and Greenholm burgh	1834	Burgh of barony 1490; Burgh of regality 1707	None
Prestwick burgh	1903	Ancient burgh of barony dating from 10th century Confirmed 1600	One of the Ayr Burghs 1918 to 1950
Saltcoats burgh	1885	Burgh of barony 1529; Confirmed 1586	One of the Ayr Burghs 1918 to 1950
Stevenston burgh	1952	None	None
Stewarton burgh	1868	None	None
Troon burgh	1896	None	One of the Ayr Burghs 1918 to 1950

== Banffshire ==
Burgh	Date of adoption of police system	Earlier burghal history	Post Union parliamentary burgh status
Banff royal burgh	1840	Created royal burgh c. 1203-6	One of the Elgin Burghs 1708 to 1918
Cullen royal burgh	1870	Royal burgh 1372	One of the Elgin Burghs 1708 to 1918
Aberchirder burgh	1889	None	None
Aberlour burgh	1894	Burgh of barony 1814	None
Buckie burgh	1888	None	None
Dufftown burgh	1863	None	None
Findochty burgh	1915	None	None
Keith burgh	1889	None	None
Macduff burgh	1853	Burgh of barony 1528	None
Portknockie burgh	1912	None	None
Portsoy burgh	1889	Burgh of barony 1550	None

== Berwickshire ==
Burgh	Date of adoption of police system	Earlier burghal history	Post Union parliamentary burgh status
Lauder royal burgh	1875	Confirmed 1502	One of the Haddington Burghs 1708 to 1885
Coldstream burgh	1833	Burgh of barony 1621	None
Duns burgh	1842	Burgh of barony 1490	None
Eyemouth burgh	1866	Burgh of barony 1598	None

== Buteshire ==
Burgh	Date of adoption of police system	Earlier burghal history	Post Union parliamentary burgh status
Rothesay royal burgh	1846	Royal burgh 1401	One of the Ayr Burghs 1708 to 1832
Millport burgh	1864	None	None

== Caithness ==
Burgh	Date of adoption of police system	Earlier burghal history	Post Union parliamentary burgh status
Wick royal burgh	1862	Royal burgh 1589	One of the Tain Burghs 1708 to 1832 and of the Wick Burghs 1832 to 1918
Thurso burgh	1841	Burgh of barony 1633	None

== Clackmannanshire ==
Burgh	Date of adoption of police system	Earlier burghal history	Post Union parliamentary burgh status
Alloa burgh	1854	Burgh of regality 1497, reerected 1620	None
Alva burgh	1876	None	None
Dollar burgh	1891	Burgh of regality 1702	None
Tillicoultry burgh	1871	Burgh of barony 1634	None

== Dumfriesshire ==
Burgh	Date of adoption of police system	Earlier burghal history	Post Union parliamentary burgh status
Annan royal burgh	1858	Royal burgh by 1532	One of the Dumfries Burghs 1708 to 1918
Dumfries royal burgh	1833	Royal burgh c 1186; Absorbed Maxwelltown burgh (Kirkcudbrightshire) in 1930	One of the Dumfries Burghs 1708 to 1918
Lochmaben royal burgh	1858	Confirmed 1612; Recognised as royal burgh by 1447	One of the Dumfries Burghs 1708 to 1918
Sanquhar royal burgh	1890	Royal burgh 1598; Originally burgh of barony 1484	One of the Dumfries Burghs 1708 to 1918
Langholm burgh	1845	Burgh of barony 1621; Burgh of regality 1687	None
Lockerbie burgh	1863	None	None
Moffat burgh	1864	Burgh of regality 1648; Confirmed 1662	None

== Dunbartonshire ==
Burgh	Date of adoption of police system	Earlier burghal history	Post Union parliamentary burgh status
Dumbarton royal burgh	1833	Royal burgh by 1532	One of the Clyde Burghs 1708 to 1832, of the Kilmarnock Burghs 1832 to 1918 and of the Dumbarton Burghs 1918 to 1950
Bearsden burgh	1958	None	None
Clydebank burgh	1886	None	One of the Dumbarton Burghs 1918 to 1950
Cove and Kilcreggan burgh	1865	None	None
Cumbernauld burgh	1968	Burgh of barony 1649 - 1893	None
Helensburgh burgh	1846	Burgh of barony 1802	None
Kirkintilloch burgh	1836	Burgh of barony 1526	None
Milngavie burgh	1875	Burgh of regality 1648; Confirmed 1662	None

== East Lothian (also known as Haddingtonshire) ==
Burgh	Date of adoption of police system	Earlier burghal history	Post Union parliamentary burgh status
Dunbar royal burgh	1863	'Free' burgh 1370	One of the Haddington Burghs 1708 to 1885
Haddington royal burgh	1858	Created royal burgh c 1124 - 53	One of the Haddington Burghs 1708 to 1885
North Berwick royal burgh	1860	Royal burgh by 1425	One of the Haddington Burghs 1708 to 1885
Cockenzie and Port Seton burgh	1885	Burgh of barony (as Cockenzie) 1591; Burgh of regality (as Winton) 1686	None
East Linton burgh	1863	None	None
Prestonpans burgh	1862	Burgh of barony 1552	None
Tranent burgh	1860	Burgh of barony 1542	None

== Edinburghshire ==
See Midlothian

== Elginshire ==
See Morayshire

== Fife ==
Burgh	Date of adoption of police system	Earlier burghal history	Post Union parliamentary burgh status
Anstruther Easter royal burgh	1841–1929 †	Royal burgh 1583, previously burgh of barony 1572	One of the Anstruther Burghs 1708 to 1832 and of the St Andrews Burghs 1832 to 1918
Anstruther Wester royal burgh	1893?–1929 †	Royal burgh 1587, previously burgh of barony 1541	One of the Anstruther Burghs 1708 to 1832 and of the St Andrews Burghs 1832 to 1918
Auchtermuchty royal burgh	1874	Royal burgh 1517	None
Burntisland royal burgh	1833	Royal burgh 1541	One of the Dysart Burghs 1708 to 1832 and of the Kirkcaldy Burghs 1832 to 1950
Crail royal burgh	1893?	Royal burgh since 1198, chartered 1314 - 29	One of the Anstruther Burghs 1708 to 1832 and of the St Andrews Burghs 1832 to 1918
Culross royal burgh	1893?	Royal burgh 1592; Previously burgh of barony 1490	One of the Stirling Burghs 1708 to 1918
Cupar royal burgh	1834	Royal burgh by 1327	One of the Perth Burghs 1708 to 1832
Dunfermline royal burgh	1811 - by private act	Royal burgh status restored 1594	One of the Stirling Burghs 1708 to 1918 and of the Dunfermline Burghs 1918 to 1950
Dysart royal burgh	1834–1930 ‡	Royal burgh 1587; Previously burgh of barony 1510	One of the Dysart Burghs 1708 to 1832 and of the Kirkcaldy Burghs 1832 to 1950
Earlsferry royal burgh	1893?–1929 †	Royal burgh status confirmed 1589	None
Elie and Earlsferry royal burgh	1929 †	Created 1929 from two burghs	None
Falkland royal burgh	1893?	Royal burgh 1458	None
Inverkeithing royal burgh	1892	Royal burgh 13th century	One of the Stirling Burghs 1708 to 1918 and of the Dunfermline Burghs 1918 to 1950
Kilrenny royal burgh	1848–1929 †	Royal burgh 1592, previously burgh of regality 1578	One of the Anstruther Burghs 1708 to 1832 and of the St Andrews Burghs 1832 to 1918
Kilrenny, Anstruther Easter and Anstruther Wester royal burgh	1929	Created 1929 from three royal burghs	None
Kincardine burgh	Not adopted. Burgh abolished 1893	Burgh of barony 1663	None
Kinghorn royal burgh	1833	Royal burgh 12th century	One of the Dysart Burghs 1708 to 1832 and of the Kirkcaldy Burghs 1832 to 1950
Kirkcaldy royal burgh	1811 (by private act)	Royal burgh 1644; Previously ecclesiastical burgh Absorbed Dysart royal burgh 1930	One of the Dysart Burghs 1708 to 1832 and of the Kirkcaldy Burghs 1832 to 1950
Newburgh royal burgh	1850s	Royal burgh 1631, previously burgh of regality 1600	None
Pittenweem royal burgh	1842	Royal burgh 1541, burgh of barony 1526	One of the Anstruther Burghs 1708 to 1832 and of the St Andrews Burghs 1832 to 1918
St Andrews royal burgh	1893?	Royal burgh 1620; Previously burgh of regality 1614 and ecclesiastical burgh (12th century)	One of the Perth Burghs 1708 to 1832
Buckhaven and Methil burgh	1891	Buckhaven burgh of barony 1662, did not endure	One of the Kirkcaldy Burghs 1918 to 1950
Cowdenbeath burgh	1890	None	One of the Dunfermline Burghs 1918 to 1950
Elie burgh	1865–1929 †	Burgh of barony 1599	None
Ladybank burgh	1877	None	None
Leslie burgh	1865	Burgh of barony (as Leslie Green) 1458	None
Leven burgh	1867	Burgh of barony 1609	None
Lochgelly burgh	1876	None	One of the Dunfermline Burghs 1918 to 1950
Markinch burgh	1891	Burgh of barony 1673	None
Newport-on-Tay burgh	1887	None	None
St. Monance burgh	1933	Burgh of barony 1596	None
Tayport burgh	1887	Burgh of barony (as Ferry-Port on Craig)1599; Burgh of regality (as Ferry-Port on Craig)1725	None

† Burghs merged 1929

‡ Dysart absorbed by Kircaldy royal burgh 1930

== Forfarshire ==
See Angus

== Haddingtonshire ==
See East Lothian

== Inverness-shire ==
Burgh	Date of adoption of police system	Earlier burghal history	Post Union parliamentary burgh status
Inverness royal burgh	1862	Created royal burgh c 1130 - 53	One of the Inverness Burghs 1708 to 1918
Fort William burgh	1875	Burgh of barony as Gordonsburgh 1618	None
Kingussie burgh	1867	Burgh of barony 1464	None

== Kincardineshire ==
Burgh	Date of adoption of police system	Earlier burghal history	Post Union parliamentary burgh status
Inverbervie royal burgh	1893?	Royal burgh by 1341	One of the Aberdeen Burghs 1708 to 1832 and of the Montrose Burghs 1832 to 1950
Banchory burgh	1885	May have been a burgh of barony 1805	None
Laurencekirk burgh	1889	Burgh of barony 1779	None
Stonehaven burgh	1889	Burgh of barony 1587	None

== Kinross-shire ==
Burgh	Date of adoption of police system	Earlier burghal history	Post Union parliamentary burgh status
Kinross burgh	1864	Burgh of barony 1541; Burgh of regality 1685	None

== Kirkcudbrightshire ==
Burgh	Date of adoption of police system	Earlier burghal history	Post Union parliamentary burgh status
Kirkcudbright royal burgh	1893?	Royal burgh 1445	One of the Dumfries Burghs 1708 to 1918
New Galloway royal burgh	1892	Royal burgh 1630	One of the Wigtown Burghs 1708 to 1885
Castle Douglas burgh	1862	Burgh of barony 1791	None
Dalbeattie burgh	1858	None	None
Gatehouse of Fleet burgh	1852	Burgh of barony 1795	None
Maxwelltown burgh	1833–1931 †	Burgh of barony 1810	None

† Maxwelltown burgh was absorbed by Dumfries royal burgh 1931.

== Lanarkshire ==
Note: The royal burgh of Glasgow was part of the county until 1893.

Burgh	Date of adoption of police system	Earlier burghal history	Post Union parliamentary burgh status
Lanark royal burgh	1855	Created royal burgh 1153 - 59	One of the Linlithgow Burghs 1708 to 1832 and of the Falkirk Burghs 1832 to 1918
Rutherglen royal burgh	1863	Created royal burgh 1124 -53	One of the Clyde Burghs 1708 to 1832 and of the Kilmarnock Burghs 1832 to 1918
Airdrie burgh	1849	Burgh of barony 1821; Parliamentary burgh 1832	One of the Falkirk Burghs 1832 to 1918
Biggar burgh	1863	Burgh of barony 1451	None
Bishopbriggs burgh	1964	None	None
Coatbridge burgh	1885	Created burgh by private act 1885	None
East Kilbride burgh	1963	None	None
Govan burgh	1864–1912 ‡	Burgh of barony 1607	None
Hamilton burgh	1857	Burgh of regality 1669	One of the Falkirk Burghs 1832 to 1918
Hillhead burgh	1869–1891 ‡	None	None
Maryhill burgh	1856–1891 ‡	None	None
Motherwell burgh	1865–1920 †	None	None
Motherwell and Wishaw burgh	1920	Formed 1920 from two burghs	None
Partick burgh	1852–1912 ‡	None	None
Wishaw burgh	1855–1920 †	None	None

† Burghs merged 1920

‡ Burghs absorbed by Glasgow royal burgh on dates shown

== Linlithgowshire ==
See West Lothian

== Midlothian (also known as Edinburghshire) ==
Note: The royal burgh of Edinburgh and its liberties formed a separate county of itself from the thirteenth century.

Burgh	Date of adoption of police system	Earlier burghal history	Post Union parliamentary burgh status
Bonnyrigg burgh	1865–1920 †	None	None
Bonnyrigg and Lasswade burgh	1930	Formed 1930 from two burghs	None
Dalkeith burgh	1878	Burgh of barony 1401; Burgh of regality 1540	None
Lasswade burgh	1881–1920 †	None	None
Leith burgh	1862–1920 ‡	Burgh of barony 1636; Parliamentary burgh 1832	One of the Leith Burghs 1832 to 1918
Loanhead burgh	1884	Burgh of barony 1669	None
Musselburgh burgh	1849	Burgh of regality 1562; Parliamentary burgh 1832	One of the Leith Burghs 1832 to 1918
Penicuik burgh	1866	None	None
Portobello burgh	1850–1896 ‡	Parliamentary burgh 1832	One of the Leith Burghs 1832 to 1918

† Burghs merged 1920

‡ Burghs absorbed by Edinburgh royal burgh in years shown (Portobello continued, however, as a separate parliamentary burgh until 1918)

== Morayshire (also known as Elginshire) ==
Burgh	Date of adoption of police system	Earlier burghal history	Post Union parliamentary burgh status
Elgin royal burgh	1833	Royal burgh status confirmed 1457	One of the Elgin Burghs 1708 to 1918
Forres royal burgh	1836	Re-erected as royal burgh 1496	One of the Inverness Burghs 1708 to 1918
Burghead burgh	1900	None	None
Grantown-on-Spey burgh	1898	Burgh of regality 1694	None
Lossiemouth and Branderburgh burgh	1890	None	None
Rothes burgh	1884	None	None

== Nairnshire ==
Burgh	Date of adoption of police system	Earlier burghal history	Post Union parliamentary burgh status
Nairn royal burgh	1841	Royal burgh status regained 1476	One of the Inverness Burghs 1708 to 1918

== Orkney ==
Burgh	Date of adoption of police system	Earlier burghal history	Post Union parliamentary burgh status
Kirkwall royal burgh	1838	Royal burgh 1486	One of the Tain Burghs 1708 to 1832 and of the Wick Burghs 1832 to 1918
Stromness burgh	1856	Burgh of barony 1817	None

== Peeblesshire ==
Burgh	Date of adoption of police system	Earlier burghal history	Post Union parliamentary burgh status
Peebles royal burgh	1864	Royal burgh c. 1153	One of the Linlithgow Burghs 1707 to 1832
Innerleithen burgh	1868	None	None

== Perthshire ==
Burgh	Date of adoption of police system	Earlier burghal history	Post Union parliamentary burgh status
Auchterarder royal burgh	1894	Reinstated as royal burgh 1951	None
Perth royal burgh	1865	Royal burgh c. 1124 - 1127	One of the Perth Burghs 1708 to 1832; Perth burgh constituency 1832 to 1950
Aberfeldy burgh	1887	None	None
Abernethy burgh	1877	Burgh of barony 1459	None
Alyth burgh	1834	Burgh of barony 1488	None
Blairgowrie burgh	1833–1930 †	Burgh of barony 1634	None
Blairgowrie and Rattray burgh	1930	Formed 1930 from two burghs	None
Callander burgh	1866	None	None
Coupar Angus burgh	1852	Burgh of barony 1607	None
Crieff burgh	1864	None	None
Doune burgh	1890	None	None
Dunblane burgh	1870	Burgh of regality 1442	None
Pitlochry burgh	1947	None	None
Rattray burgh	1877–1930 †	None	None

† Burghs merged 1930

== Renfrewshire ==
Burgh	Date of adoption of police system	Earlier burghal history	Post Union parliamentary burgh status
Renfrew royal burgh	1855	Royal burgh status 1397	One of the Clyde Burghs 1708 to 1832 and of the Kilmarnock Burghs 1832 to 1918
Barrhead burgh	1894	None	None
Crawfurdsdyke burgh	adopted into Greenock 1840	Burgh of barony 1642	None
Crosshill burgh	1871–1891 †	None	None
Gourock burgh	1858	Burgh of barony 1694	None
Govanhill burgh	1876–1891 †	None	None
Greenock burgh	1840	Burgh of barony 1635; Parliamentary burgh 1832	None
Johnstone burgh	1857	None	None
Kinning Park burgh	1871–1905 †	None	None
Paisley burgh	1806 (Private Act)	Burgh of barony 1488; Burgh of regality 1587	None
Pollokshaws burgh	1858–1912 †	Burgh of barony 1813	None
Pollokshields burgh	1876–1891 †	None	None
Pollokshields East burgh	1880–1891 †	None	None
Port Glasgow burgh	1800 (Private Act)	Burgh of barony 1668	One of the Kilmarnock Burghs 1832 to 1918

† Burghs absorbed by Glasgow royal burgh on dates shown

== Ross and Cromarty (Ross-shire and Cromartyshire) ==
Burgh	Date of adoption of police system	Earlier burghal history	Post Union parliamentary burgh status
Dingwall royal burgh	1834	Royal burgh 1498	One of the Tain Burghs 1708 to 1832 and of the Wick Burghs 1832 to 1918
Fortrose royal burgh	1867	Union of Rosemarkie and Fortrose royal burghs 1661	One of the Inverness Burghs 1708 to 1918
Tain royal burgh	1854	Royal burgh 1439	One of the Tain Burghs 1708 to 1832 and of the Wick Burghs 1832 to 1918
Cromarty burgh	1848	Burgh of barony 1685; Parliamentary burgh 1832	One of the Wick Burghs 1832 to 1918
Invergordon burgh	1864	Burgh of barony 1694	None
Stornoway burgh	1863	Burgh of barony 1607	None

== Roxburghshire ==
Burgh	Date of adoption of police system	Earlier burghal history	Post Union parliamentary burgh status
Jedburgh royal burgh	1847	Royal burgh status restored by 1424	One of the Haddington Burghs 1708 to 1885
Hawick burgh	1845	Burgh of barony 1511, burgh of regality 1669	One of the Hawick Burghs 1868 to 1918
Kelso burgh	1838	Burgh of barony 1614	None
Melrose burgh	1895	Burgh of barony 1605; Burgh of regality 1620	None

== Selkirkshire ==
Burgh	Date of adoption of police system	Earlier burghal history	Post Union parliamentary burgh status
Selkirk royal burgh	1863	Royal burgh by 1328	One of the Linlithgow Burghs 1708 to 1832 and of the Hawick Burghs 1868 to 1918
Galashiels burgh	1850	Burgh of barony 1599	One of the Hawick Burghs 1868 to 1918

== Stirlingshire ==
Burgh	Date of adoption of police system	Earlier burghal history	Post Union parliamentary burgh status
Stirling royal burgh	1857	Created royal burgh c 1124 - 1127	One of the Stirling Burghs 1707 to 1918 and of the Stirling and Falkirk Burghs 1918 to 1950
Bridge of Allan burgh	1870	None	None
Denny and Dunipace burgh	1877	None	
Falkirk burgh	1859	Burgh of barony 1600; Burgh of regality 1646; Parliamentary burgh 1832	One of the Falkirk Burghs 1832 to 1918 and of the Stirling and Falkirk Burghs 1918 to 1950
Grangemouth burgh	1872	None	One of the Stirling and Falkirk Burghs 1918 to 1950
Kilsyth burgh	1878	Burgh of barony 1620	None

== Sutherland ==
Burgh	Date of adoption of police system	Earlier burghal history	Post Union parliamentary burgh status
Dornoch royal burgh	1891	Royal burgh 1628	One of the Tain Burghs 1708 to 1832 and of the Wick Burghs 1832 to 1918

== West Lothian (also known as Linlithgowshire) ==
Burgh	Date of adoption of police system	Earlier burghal history	Post Union parliamentary burgh status
Linlithgow royal burgh	1866	Royal burgh from c. 1138	One of the Linlithgow Burghs 1708 to 1832 and of the Falkirk Burghs 1832 to 1918
Queensferry royal burgh	1882	Royal burgh 1636	One of the Stirling Burghs 1708 to 1918
Armadale burgh	1864	None	None
Bathgate burgh	1865	Burgh of barony 1663	None
Bo'ness burgh	1883	Burgh of regality 1668	None
Whitburn burgh	1861	None	None

== Wigtownshire ==
Burgh	Date of adoption of police system	Earlier burghal history	Post Union parliamentary burgh status
Stranraer royal burgh	1848	Royal burgh 1617	One of the Wigtown Burghs 1708 to 1885
Whithorn royal burgh	1873	Royal burgh 1511	One of the Wigtown Burghs 1708 to 1885
Wigtown royal burgh	1893 ?	Royal burgh 1469	One of the Wigtown Burghs 1708 to 1885
Newton Stewart burgh	1861	Burgh of barony 1677	None

== Zetland ==
Burgh	Date of adoption of police system	Earlier burghal history	Post Union parliamentary burgh status
Lerwick burgh	1833	Burgh of barony 1818	None

== See also ==
- Burgh
- List of towns and cities in Scotland by population
- List of UK place names with royal patronage
- List of towns in England, Northern Ireland, Republic of Ireland, Wales
- List of cities in the United Kingdom
- District of burghs
