= Municipality =

Local government area

A municipality is usually a single administrative division having corporate status and powers of self-government or jurisdiction as granted by national and regional laws to which it is subordinate.

The term municipality may also mean the governing body of a given municipality. A municipality is a general-purpose administrative subdivision, as opposed to a special-purpose district.

The English word is derived from French municipalité, which in turn derives from the Latin municipalis, based on the word for social contract (municipium), referring originally to the Latin communities that supplied Rome with troops in exchange for their own incorporation into the Roman state (granting Roman citizenship to the inhabitants) while permitting the communities to retain their own local governments (a limited autonomy).

A municipality can be any political jurisdiction from a sovereign state such as the Principality of Monaco to a small village such as West Hampton Dunes, New York.

The territory over which a municipality has jurisdiction may encompass:

- only one populated place such as a city, town, or village
- several such places (e.g., early jurisdictions in the U.S. state of New Jersey (1798–1899) as townships governing several villages, municipalities of Mexico, municipalities of Colombia)
- only parts of such places, sometimes boroughs of a city, such as the 34 municipalities of Santiago, Chile.

== Political powers ==
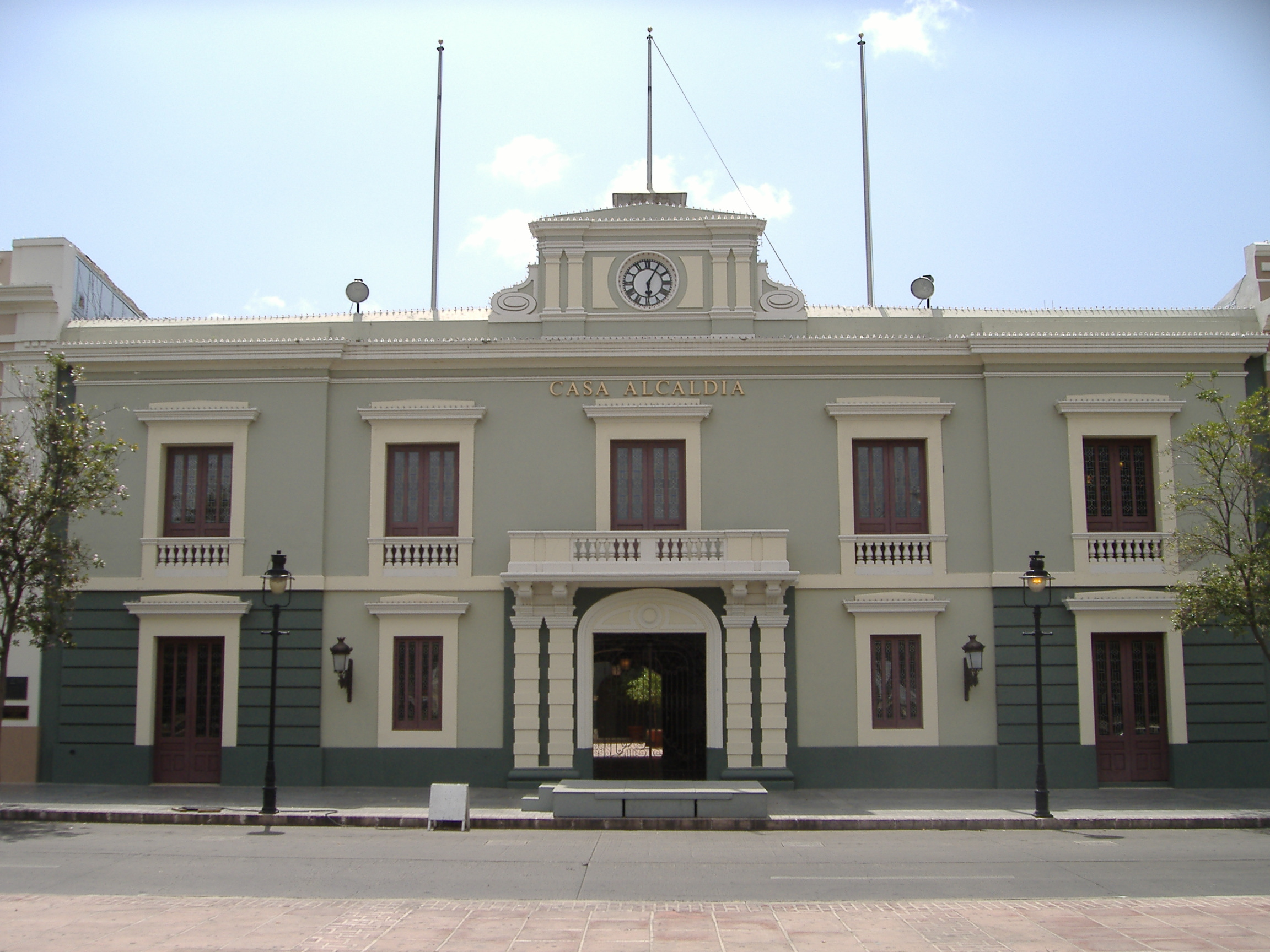
The Ponce City Hall, in the city of Ponce, Puerto Rico, is the seat of the government for both the city and the surrounding barrios making up the municipality.

Powers of municipalities range from virtual autonomy to complete subordination to the state. Municipalities may have the right to tax individuals and corporations with income tax, property tax, and corporate income tax but may also receive substantial funding from the state. In some European countries such as Germany, municipalities have the constitutional right to supply public services through municipally owned public utility companies.

== Terms in various countries ==
New York City's composite five boroughs are all counties containing historical municipalities.: 1. Manhattan; 2. Brooklyn; 3. Queens; 4. The Bronx; 5. Staten Island; In 1898, all of the municipalities within the five boroughs were merged into one municipality, and the five counties became boroughs of the new New York City municipality. The five boroughs, however, still have the status of counties.

City or town municipalities (red-colored) with other non-town municipalities in Finland (2020)

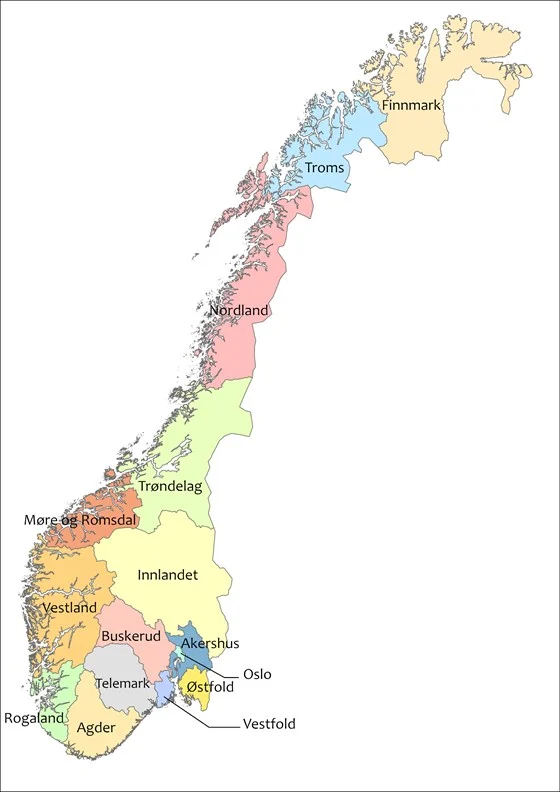
In Norway, both the first-level administrative divisions and the second-level administrative divisions are municipalities. Norway has 15 first-level municipalities (which are shown in this image), which are called fylkeskommuner (county municipalities) and share borders with the country's counties. They are further divided into 357 second-level municipalities called primærkommuner (primary municipalities) or just kommuner (municipalities).

=== Municipality ===
Terms cognate with "municipality", mostly referring to territory or political structure, are Spanish municipio (Spain) and municipalidad (Chile), Catalan municipi, Portuguese município.

- In Brazil, a município is the local government that is recognized by the Brazilian Federal Constitution and established through state constitutions. It is the smallest territorial division holding executive and legislative powers. Since the Constitution of 1988, all municípios are members of the federation. Colloquially, the local population uses the terms municipality and city interchangeably although the constitution defines "city" as the seat of the municipality.

=== Commune ===
In many countries, terms cognate with "commune" are used, referring to the community living in the area and the common interests:

- in Romance languages, such as in French commune (France, French-speaking Belgium and Switzerland, French-speaking Africa, e.g. Benin), in Italian comune (Italy, Italian-speaking Switzerland, e.g. Ticino), in Portuguese comuna (Angola), in Romanian comună (Romania), and in Spanish comuna (Chile);
- in Nordic languages such as in Danish and Norwegian kommune (Denmark, Norway), in Faroese kommuna (Faroe Islands), and in Swedish kommun (Sweden, Finland);
- in West Germanic languages such as in Dutch gemeente (Netherlands, Dutch-speaking areas of Belgium), Luxembourgish Gemeng (Luxembourg) and German Gemeinde (Austria, Germany);
- in Finnish kunta (Finland);
- in Ukrainian hromada (Ukraine); and
- in Polish gmina (Poland).

The same terms Gemeente (Dutch) or Gemeinde (German) may be used for church congregations or parishes such as in the German and Dutch Protestant churches.

=== Other terms ===
In Greece, the word Δήμος (demos) is used, also meaning "community"; the word is known in English from the compound democracy ("rule by the people").

In some countries, the Spanish term ayuntamiento, referring to a municipality's administration building, is extended by synecdoche to denote the municipality itself. In Moldova and Romania, both municipalities (municipiu; urban administrative units) and communes (comună; rural units) exist, and a commune may be part of a municipality.

In many countries, comparable entities may exist with various names.

=== English-speaking ===
- In Australia, the term local government area (LGA) is used in place of the generic municipality. Here, the "LGA Structure covers only incorporated areas of Australia. Incorporated areas are legally designated parts of states and territories over which incorporated local governing bodies have responsibility."
- In Canada, municipalities are local governments established through provincial and territorial legislation, usually within general municipal statutes. Types of municipalities within Canada include cities, district municipalities, municipal districts, municipalities, parishes, rural municipalities, towns, townships, villages, and villes among others. The province of Ontario has different tiers of municipalities, including lower, upper, and single tiers. Types of upper tier municipalities in Ontario include counties and regional municipalities. Nova Scotia also has regional municipalities, which include cities, counties, districts, or towns as municipal units.
- In India, a municipality (also known as municipal council) is an urban local body that administers a city of population 100,000 or more (the criteria varies from state to state). However, there are exceptions to that, as previously municipalities were constituted in urban centers with population over 20,000, so all the urban bodies which were previously classified as municipality were reclassified as municipality even if their population was under 100,000. It interacts directly with the state government, but it is administratively part of its district. Generally, smaller district cities and bigger towns have a municipality. Municipalities are also a form of local self-government entrusted with some duties and responsibilities, as enshrined in the Constitutional (74th Amendment) Act,1992.
- In the United Kingdom, the term was used until the Local Government Act 1972 came into effect in 1974 in England and Wales and until 1975 in Scotland and 1976 in Northern Ireland, "both for a city or town which is organized for self-government under a municipal corporation, and also for the governing body itself. Such a corporation in Great Britain consists of a head as a mayor or provost, and of superior members, as aldermen and councillors". Since local government reorganisation, the unit in England, Northern Ireland and Wales is known as a district and in Scotland as a council area. A district may be awarded borough or city status, or can retain its district title.
- In Jersey, a municipality refers to the honorary officials elected to run each of the 12 parishes into which it is subdivided. This is the highest level of regional government in this jurisdiction.
- In Trinidad and Tobago, "municipality" is usually understood as a city, town, or other local government unit, formed by municipal charter from the state as a municipal corporation. A town may be awarded borough status and, later on, may be upgraded to city status. Chaguanas, San Fernando, Port of Spain, Arima and Point Fortin are the 5 current municipalities in Trinidad and Tobago.
- In the United States, "municipality" is usually understood as a city, town, village, or other local government unit, formed by municipal charter from the state as a municipal corporation. In a state law context, some U.S. state codes define "municipality" more widely, from the state itself to any political subdivisions given jurisdiction over an area that may include multiple populated places and unpopulated places (see also: Local government in the United States#Municipal governments).

=== Chinese-speaking ===
- In the People's Republic of China, a direct-administered municipality (直辖市 in pinyin: zhíxiáshì) is a municipality with equal status to a province: Beijing Municipality, Chongqing Municipality, Shanghai Municipality, and Tianjin Municipality (see also: Direct-administered municipalities of China).
- In the Republic of China (Taiwan), a special municipality (直轄市 in pinyin: zhíxiáshì) is a municipality with equal status to a province: Kaohsiung, New Taipei, Taichung, Tainan, Taipei, and Taoyuan (see also: Special municipality (Taiwan)).

== Municipal corporation ==
Municipal corporation is the legal term for a local governing body, which can include (but is not necessarily limited to) cities, counties, towns, townships, charter townships, villages, and boroughs. The term can also be used to describe municipally owned corporations.

Municipal incorporation occurs when such municipalities become self-governing entities under the laws of the state or province in which they are located. Often, this event is marked by the award or declaration of a municipal charter. A city charter or town charter or municipal charter is a legal document establishing a municipality, such as a city or town.

When a municipality revokes its right to self-government, it disincorporates.

=== By country ===
==== Bangladesh ====
There are 13 city corporations in Bangladesh. Two of them are located in the capital Dhaka and the remaining 11 are located in the most populous cities of the eight divisions. They carry out major works in the cities and perform socio-economic and civic functions. In addition, there are 330 municipalities in the eight divisions of Bangladesh. A city corporation is a much stronger and larger Local governing body than a municipal corporation. This is because a city corporation consists of a metropolitan city of a district and a municipal corporation consists of a municipal area in a sub-district.

==== Canada ====
In Canada, charters are granted by provincial authorities.

==== India ====
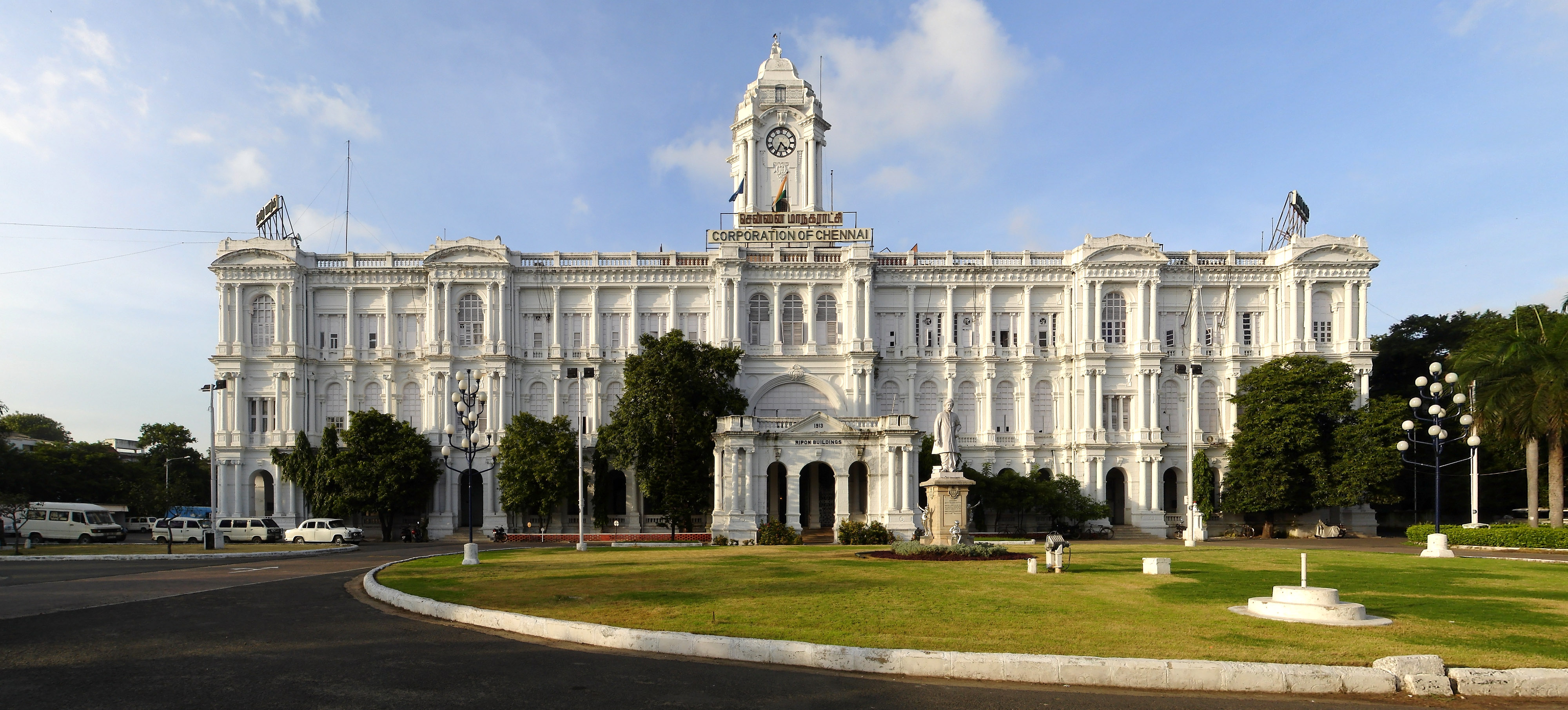
Chennai Corporation headquarters

Municipal corporations are the local bodies responsible for governing large urban areas in India. Their establishment is mandated by the 74th amendment, and each municipal corporation is established through and governed by municipal acts passed by state legislatures. The Greater Chennai Corporation is the oldest municipal corporation in India, and the oldest in the Commonwealth outside Britain.

==== Ireland ====
The title "corporation" was used in boroughs from soon after the Norman conquest until the Local Government Act 2001. Under the 2001 act, county boroughs were renamed "cities" and their corporations became "city councils"; other borough corporations were renamed "borough councils".

After the Partition of Ireland, the corporations in the Irish Free State were Dublin, Cork, Limerick and Waterford (county boroughs) and Drogheda, Kilkenny, Sligo, Clonmel, and Wexford (non-county boroughs). Dún Laoghaire gained borough status in 1930 as "The Corporation of Dun Laoghaire". Galway's borough status, lost in 1840, was restored in 1937; it was formally styled "the Mayor, Aldermen and Burgesses of the Borough of Galway" but referred to as "the Corporation".

==== New Zealand ====
The New Zealand Constitution Act 1852 allowed municipal corporations to be established within the new provinces of New Zealand. The term fell out of favour following the abolition of the provinces in 1876.

==== Pakistan ====
Municipal corporations are local government bodies responsible for running the city system of Pakistan. They have been established under their respective Local Government Acts of the provinces. Article 140-A of the Constitution of Pakistan, introduced by the 18th Amendment in 2010, mandates that each province must establish a local government system by law and devolve political, administrative, and financial power to elected local representatives.

==== United Kingdom ====
The ancient boroughs of England and Wales were typically incorporated by a royal charter, though some were boroughs by prescription. The Municipal Corporations Act 1835 and Municipal Corporations Act 1882 abolished the corporations of rotten boroughs and other small rural areas. The Local Government Act 1888 aligned the powers of the remaining borough corporations with those of the new urban district councils. All borough corporations were replaced under the Local Government Act 1972, with corporations now being designated as "councils", with the exception of the City of London Corporation.

The corporations of the burghs of Scotland were similar in origin and were reformed or replaced in the nineteenth century before being abolished by the Local Government (Scotland) Act 1973. The Irish borough corporations within what is now Northern Ireland were reformed by the Municipal Corporations (Ireland) Act 1840 and Local Government (Ireland) Act 1898 and replaced by the Local Government Act (Northern Ireland) 1972.

==== United States ====
Most U.S. states and territories have at least two tiers of local government: counties and municipalities. Louisiana uses the term parish, Alaska uses the term borough, and Connecticut uses the term planning region for what the U.S. Census Bureau terms county equivalents in those states. Civil townships or towns are used as subdivisions of a county in 20 states, mostly in the Northeast and Midwest.

Population centers may be organized into incorporated municipalities of several types, including the city, town, borough, and village. The types and nature of these municipal entities vary from state to state. In addition to these general-purpose local governments, states may also create special-purpose local governments. Depending on the state, local governments may operate under their own charters or under general law, or a state may have a mix of chartered and general-law local governments. Generally, in a state having both chartered and general-law local governments, the chartered local governments have more local autonomy and home rule. Municipalities are typically subordinate to a county government, with some exceptions. Certain cities, for example, have consolidated with their county government as consolidated city-counties. In Virginia, cities are completely independent from the county in which they would otherwise be a part. In some states, particularly in New England, towns form the primary unit of local government below the state level, in some cases eliminating the need for county government entirely. Many rural areas and even some suburban areas of many states have no municipal government below the county level.

In addition to counties and municipalities, states often create special purpose authorities, such as school districts and districts for fire protection, sanitary sewer service, public transportation, public libraries, public parks or forests, water resource management, and conservation districts. Such special purpose districts may encompass areas in multiple municipalities or counties. According to the US Census Bureau's data collected in 2012, there were 89,004 local government units in the United States. This data shows a decline from 89,476 units since the last census of local governments performed in 2007.

Each of the five permanently inhabited U.S. territories is also subdivided into smaller entities. Puerto Rico has 78 municipalities, and the Northern Mariana Islands has four municipalities. Guam has villages, the U.S. Virgin Islands has districts, and American Samoa has districts and unorganized atolls.

Each Indian Reservation is subdivided in various ways. For example, the Navajo Nation is subdivided into agencies and chapter houses, while the Blackfeet Nation is subdivided into communities.

=== Municipal corporations as enterprises ===
According to one definition of the term, municipal corporations are "organisations with independent corporate status, managed by an executive board appointed primarily by local government officials, and with majority public ownership". Some such corporations rely on revenue from user fees, distinguishing them from agencies and special districts funded through taxation, although this is not always the case. Such municipal corporations result from a process of "externalization", and require different skills and orientations from the respective local governments, and follow common changes in the institutional landscape of public services. They are argued to be more efficient than government bureaucracies, having been observed as generally more successful in providing most public goods and services, despite seeming to have higher failure rates initially, hypothetically because of their legal and managerial status.

== Municipalities by country ==
| Country | Term | Example | Subdivision of | Quantity | Notes | Further reading |
|---|---|---|---|---|---|---|
| Brazil | município | Blumenau, Cuiabá, Maceió, Porto Alegre | a state (estado), which is part of a region (região) | 5,570 | A municipality usually is divided in the urban part, the city (cidade), and the rural part. | List of municipalities of Brazil |
| Croatia | Općina | Fužine, Bosiljevo, Klana, Kršan | Županija (county in English) | 428 | A municipality usually has center village of same name. Exception: Vinodolska općina - center village: Bribir. | Municipalities of Croatia |
| Denmark | kommune | Aarhus, Frederiksberg | Region | 98 | | Municipalities of Denmark |
| Finland | Kunta | Kerava | Region | 308 | | Municipalities of Finland |
| Greece | Deme / Δήμος | Athens, Thessaloniki | | 332 | A municipality usually is divided in Municipal Units and them into Communities. | List of municipalities of Greece |
| Ireland | bardas, contae or comhairle | Baile Átha Cliath | a province (cúige) or a county (contae) | 31 | A municipality usually has authority of the whole county. In some cases however, authority is reduced to a subdivision of the county for highly populated regions, especially in Dublin (Baile Átha Cliath) | Local governments in the Republic of Ireland |
| Italy | Comune | Venezia | a comune which is part of a province (provincia) which is part of a region (regione). | 7,896 | Municipio is used for subdivisions of larger comuni; in some cases, municipalities are united to form mountain communities (comunità montane) | List of municipalities of Italy |
| India | municipality (nagar palika, or nagar parishad in Hindi) | Bangaon Municipality: Jalpaiguri Municipality; Darjeeling Municipality; Jagtial Municipality; English Bazar Municipality | a state or union territory | 1937 | It is an administrative unit that governs a specific urban area, such as a town or city. Municipalities are established under state legislation and operate under the framework of the relevant state municipal acts. Municipalities have their own elected bodies, which typically include a mayor or chairperson and councilors representing different wards or constituencies within the urban area. | Municipal governance in India |
| Netherlands | municipality (gemeente) | Government of Amsterdam; Government of Rotterdam | a province or special municipality which falls under no province but directly under the central government. | 345 | It is the lowest administrative unit of the country that governs a specific area, such as a town or city. Municipalities fall under the Dutch Municipalities Act. It is governed by a directly elected municipal council, a municipal executive and a mayor. | Municipal council (Netherlands) |
| Philippines | bayan, munisipyo or munisipalidad | Janiuay | a province (lalawigan or probinsya, except for Pateros) | 1,488 | A municipality is the official name for a town and is divided into barangays. Municipalities with a larger population and income may become a city through a city charter. | Municipalities of the Philippines |
| Portugal | município | Lisbon, Sintra, Vila Nova de Gaia | 18 districts and 2 autonomous regions (Azores and Madeira) | 308 | Usually a municipality is named after its largest or historically most important town or city. Municipalities are typically much larger than the city or town after which they are named. | List of municipalities of Portugal |
| Puerto Rico | municipio | Arecibo | none | 78 | municipality consists of an urban area (termed a city or town) plus all of its surrounding barrios comprising the municipality. It has a popularly elected administration and a municipal mayor. The seat of the municipal government is located in such urban area and serves the entire municipal jurisdiction. | Municipalities of Puerto Rico |
| Sweden | kommun | Stockholm Municipality, Gothenburg Municipality, Malmö Municipality, Ale Municipality | a region (region), the 21 self-governing areas consisting of one or more municipalities) a county (län), subdivision of the national state into 21 areas administered by County administrative boards. Regions and counties often follow the same geographical borders. | 290 | According to the Instrument of Government, Swedish democracy is realised through a parliamentary form of government and through local selfgovernment. Municipalities are independent of the regions and counties in which they are located. Before 1971, municipalities were incorporated as either cities (stad), market towns (köping) or rural municipalities (landskommun). The city-label is still used for marketing purposes, but lacks legal status and cannot be used in formal governing documents. For resident and land registration purposes, Sweden is also divided in 2 523 districts (distrikt), based on the historic Church of Sweden parishes of 1999. The districts lack authority, governing body and agency. | Municipalities of Sweden |
| Ukraine | Hromada / Громада | Vovchansk hromada, Staryi Ostropil hromada | a region (oblast) | 1469 | A hromada usually is divided in Starosta Districts (старостинські округи) or City Raions (міські райони/райони в місті). | List of hromadas of Ukraine |

- In Portuguese language usage, there are two words to distinguish the territory and the administrative organ. When referring to the territory, the word concelho is used, when referring to the organ of State, the word município is used. This differentiation is in use in Portugal and some of its former overseas provinces, but it is no longer in use in Brazil, where município refers to the territorial boundaries and prefeitura is its administrative organ.

== See also ==
- Council of European Municipalities and Regions
- Council–manager government
- Creature of statute
- Lists of municipalities
- Mayor–council government
