= Thomas Niven =

Scottish minister

Thomas Brown William Niven (15 March 1834 – 17 December 1914) was a Scottish minister who served as Moderator of the General Assembly of the Church of Scotland 1906–1907. He was a minister for more than 50 years and was also an author.

== Life ==
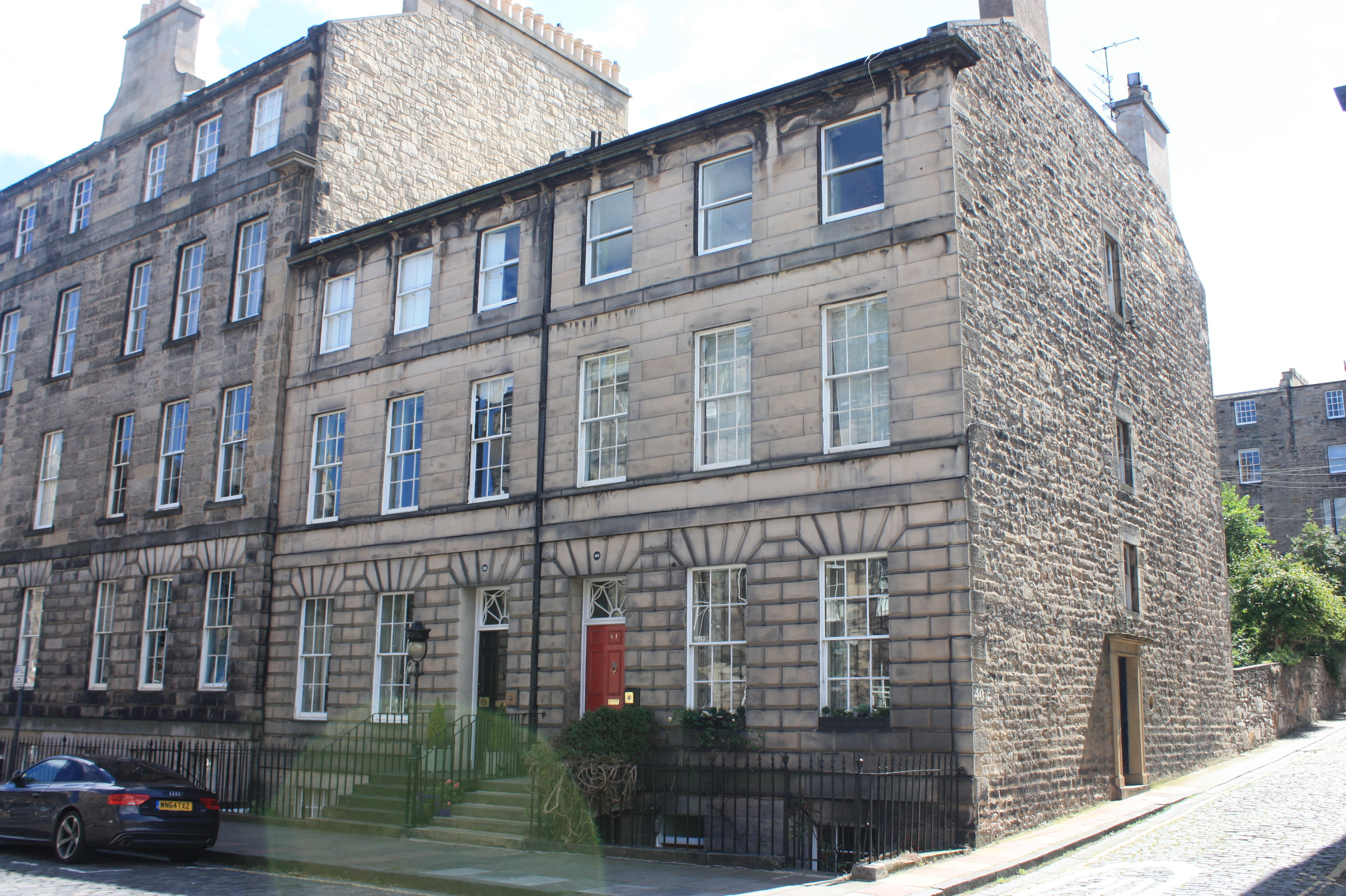
Niven's house at 40 Northumberland Street, Edinburgh (red door on right)

Thomas was born in the manse at Balfron on 15 March 1834 the son of Rev Dr Alexander Niven, the local minister since 1825. He came from a long line of Scottish clergy. He was educated privately then studied divinity at the University of Edinburgh.

He began his ministry in May 1858 at the Mission in Renton, West Dunbartonshire but within a year moved to assist at St George's Church in Edinburgh. Through a connection to the Earl of Stair he was ordained to preach at Cranston, Midlothian in October 1859. In 1868 he moved to the Glasgow Tron Church. In 1870 he turned down an offer of a post at St. Andrew's Church in Montreal, Canada. In 1872 he moved again to Linlithgow On leaving the Tron, he commented that such a post required all a man's youthful energy and vigour. At Linlithgow he found the manse pleasing. However, his puritanical spirit called him to a more humble life, and he moved back to do Mission work in 1876, this time in Pollokshields one of Glasgow's poorer districts. The small congregation were meeting in temporary accommodation when he arrived, but within a couple of years numbers increased and £25,000 was raised to build a church building. He stayed here for the remainder of his working life, living at Coldstream House on Albert Road.

He wrote a volume of the historical series edited by Robert Story- Church history of Scotland past and present. volume III. From the Revolution to the Present Time. In 1893 the University of Edinburgh awarded him an honorary doctorate, Doctor of Divinity (DD), in recognition of his preaching and his literary work. In 1868, while at the Tron, he was installed as a Freemason and became a Grand Officer at the Grand Lodge of Scotland in 1893. He was also secretary of the West of Scotland Bible Society.

In May 1906, Moderator Andrew J. Milne died in office and on 22 May Niven succeeded him. Niven celebrated his fifty years of ministerial work in 1909 and was gifted a portrait. In November 1910, he announced his intention to retire from Pollockshaws Parish Church. He retired in 1911 and was succeeded by Rev Norman Caie DD. He retired to the New Town in Edinburgh living at 40 Northumberland Street.

He died on 17 December 1914.
