= Pollokshields Library =

Library in Glasgow, Scotland

Coordinates: 55.84108°N 4.27290°W

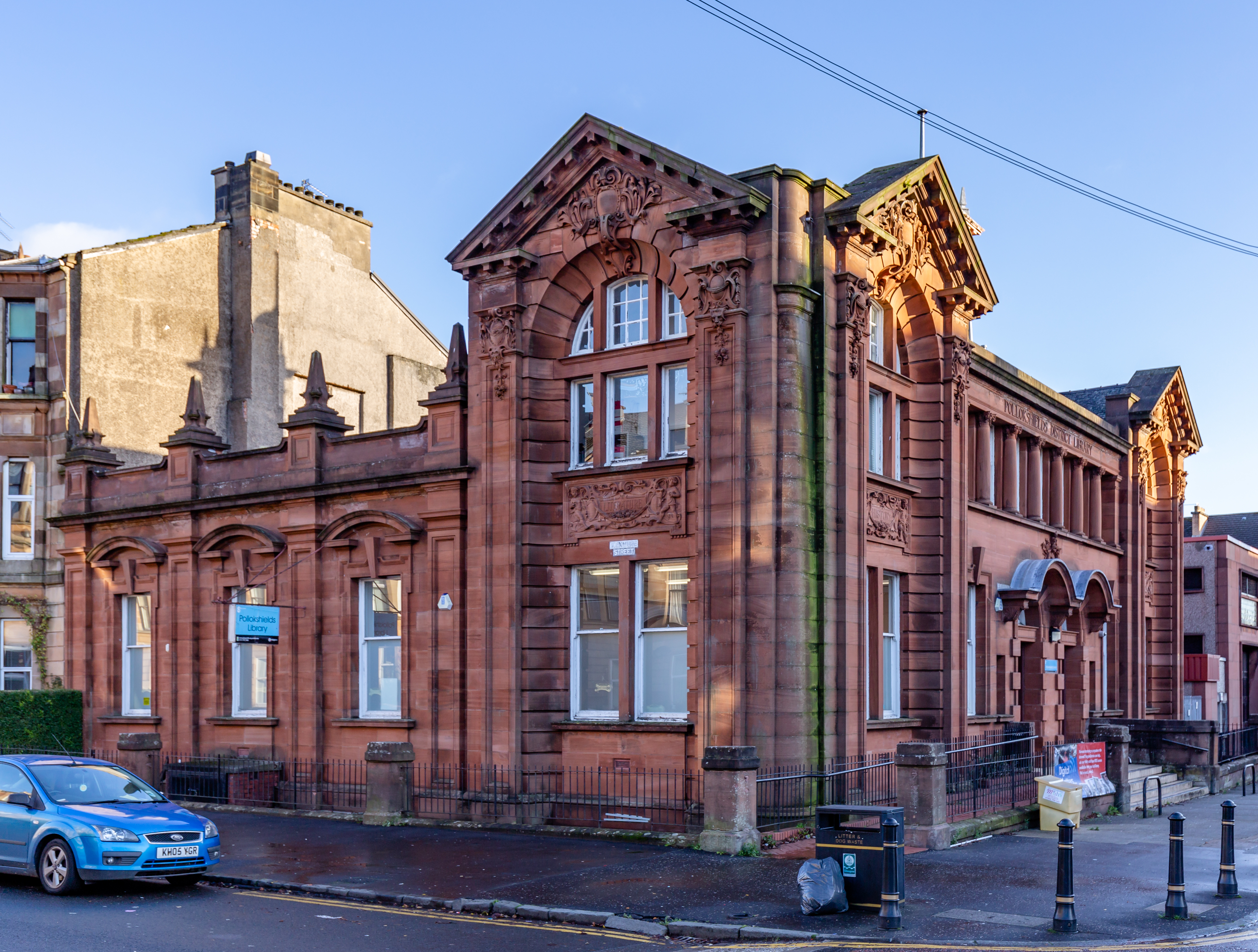
Pollokshields Library

Pollokshields Library is in Leslie Street, central Pollokshields, Glasgow. The plans were prepared by Thomas Gilmour under the supervision of City Engineer and Surveyor, Alexander B. McDonald. The library was officially opened on 20 February 1907 by Sir John Stirling Maxwell. The Edwardian Baroque building is protected as a category B listed building.

The area is home to many New Scots, consisting mainly of Sri Lankan, Pakistani and Indian residents. The library holds a good stock of books and magazines in Urdu, as well as English.

Regular events are held at the library, including talks by authors, children's activities and reading challenges.
