= Lists of municipalities =

== Africa ==
- Algeria
  - Municipalities of Algeria
- Angola
  - Municipalities of Angola
- Benin
  - Communes of Benin
- Burundi
  - Communes of Burundi
- Cape Verde
  - Municipalities of Cape Verde
- Cameroon
  - List of municipalities in Cameroon
- Djibouti
  - Sub-prefectures of Djibouti
- Equatorial Guinea
  - Municipalities of Equatorial Guinea
- Ivory Coast
  - Communes of Ivory Coast
- Lesotho
  - Community councils of Lesotho
- Libya
  - Municipalities of Libya
- Morocco
  - List of municipalities, communes, and arrondissements of Morocco
- Mozambique
  - Municipalities of Mozambique
- Namibia
  - Municipalities of Namibia
- Niger
  - Communes of Niger
- Nigeria
  - Local government areas of Nigeria
- Rwanda
  - Districts of Rwanda
- São Tomé and Príncipe
  - Municipalities of São Tomé and Príncipe
- Senegal
  - Communes of Senegal
- Sierra Leone
  - Districts of Sierra Leone
- Somalia
  - Districts of Somalia
- South Africa
  - Municipalities of South Africa
- Tunisia
  - Municipalities of Tunisia
- Zambia
  - Municipalities of Zambia
- Zimbabwe
  - Municipalities of Zimbabwe

== Asia ==
- Armenia
  - Municipalities of Armenia
- Azerbaijan
  - Municipalities of Azerbaijan
- Bahrain
  - Municipalities of Bahrain
- Bangladesh
  - Municipalities of Bangladesh
- Bhutan
  - Gewogs of Bhutan
- Brunei
  - Municipalities of Brunei
- Cambodia
  - List of districts, municipalities and sections in Cambodia
- China
  - Townships of China
  - Districts of Hong Kong
  - Municipalities and parishes of Macau
- Georgia
  - Lists of municipalities of Georgia
- India
  - Municipalities of India
- Indonesia
  - Municipalities of Indonesia
- Japan
  - Municipalities of Japan
- Lebanon
  - List of municipalities of Lebanon
- Malaysia
  - Municipalities of Malaysia
- Myanmar
  - Townships of Myanmar
- Nepal
  - Municipalities of Nepal
- North Korea
  - Municipalities of North Korea
- Philippines
  - Municipalities of the Philippines
- Qatar
  - Municipalities of Qatar
- Saudi Arabia
  - Municipalities of Saudi Arabia
- South Korea
  - Municipalities of South Korea
- Sri Lanka
  - Municipal councils of Sri Lanka
- Taiwan
  - Townships of Taiwan
- Tajikistan
  - Municipalities of Tajikistan
- Thailand
  - List of municipalities in Thailand
- Timor-Leste
  - Municipalities of Timor-Leste
- United Arab Emirates
  - Emirates of the United Arab Emirates
- Vietnam
  - Municipalities of Vietnam

== Australia/Oceania ==
- Australia
  - Municipalities of Australia
- Fiji
  - Municipalities of Fiji
- Kiribati
  - Municipalities of Kiribati
- Marshall Islands
  - Municipalities of the Marshall Islands
- Micronesia
  - Municipalities of Micronesia
- Nauru
  - Municipalities of Nauru
- New Zealand
  - Municipalities of New Zealand
- Palau
  - Municipalities of Palau
- Papua New Guinea
  - Municipalities of Papua New Guinea
- Samoa
  - Municipalities of Samoa
- Solomon Islands
  - Municipalities of the Solomon Islands
- Tonga
  - Municipalities of Tonga
- Tuvalu
  - Municipalities of Tuvalu
- Vanuatu
  - Municipalities of Vanuatu

== Europe ==
- Albania
  - Municipalities of Albania
- Andorra
  - Parishes of Andorra
- Austria
  - Municipalities of Austria
- Belarus
  - Municipalities of Belarus
- Belgium
  - Municipalities of Belgium
- Bosnia and Herzegovina
  - Municipalities of Bosnia and Herzegovina
- Bulgaria
  - Municipalities of Bulgaria
- Croatia
  - Municipalities of Croatia
- Cyprus
  - Municipalities of Cyprus
- Czech Republic
  - List of municipalities in the Czech Republic
- Denmark
  - Municipalities of Denmark
  - Municipalities of the Faroe Islands
  - Municipalities of Greenland
- Estonia
  - List of municipalities of Estonia
- Finland
  - List of municipalities of Finland
- France
  - Lists of communes of France
- Germany
  - Municipalities of Germany
- Greece
  - Municipalities of Greece
- Hungary
  - Municipalities of Hungary
- Iceland
  - Municipalities of Iceland
- Ireland
  - Municipalities of Ireland
- Italy
  - List of municipalities of Italy
- Latvia
  - Municipalities of Latvia
- Liechtenstein
  - Municipalities of Liechtenstein
- Lithuania
  - Municipalities of Lithuania
- Luxembourg
  - Municipalities of Luxembourg
- Malta
  - Local councils of Malta
- Moldova
  - Communes of Moldova
- Monaco
  - Municipality of Monaco
- Montenegro
  - Municipalities of Montenegro
- Netherlands
  - Municipalities of the Netherlands
- North Macedonia
  - Municipalities of North Macedonia
- Norway
  - Municipalities of Norway
- Poland
  - List of Polish gminas
- Portugal
  - List of municipalities of Portugal
- Romania
  - Communes of Romania
- Russia
  - Municipalities of Russia
- San Marino
  - Municipalities of San Marino
- Scotland
  - Municipalities of Scotland
- Serbia
  - Municipalities of Serbia
- Slovakia
  - Municipalities of Slovakia
- Slovenia
  - Municipalities of Slovenia
- Spain
  - List of municipalities in Spain
- Sweden
  - Municipalities of Sweden
- Switzerland
  - List of municipalities of Switzerland
- Turkey
  - Municipalities of Turkey
- Ukraine
  - List of hromadas of Ukraine
- United Kingdom
  - Municipalities of the United Kingdom
- Vatican City
  - Vatican City

== North America ==
- Antigua and Barbuda
  - List of settlements in Antigua and Barbuda
- The Bahamas
  - List of cities in the Bahamas
- Barbados
  - List of cities, towns and villages in Barbados
- Belize
  - List of municipalities in Belize
- Canada
  - Lists of municipalities in Canada
    - List of municipalities in Alberta
    - List of municipalities in British Columbia
    - List of municipalities in Manitoba
    - List of municipalities in New Brunswick
    - List of municipalities in Newfoundland and Labrador
    - List of municipalities in the Northwest Territories
    - List of municipalities in Nova Scotia
    - List of municipalities in Nunavut
    - List of municipalities in Ontario
    - List of municipalities in Prince Edward Island
    - List of municipalities in Quebec
    - List of municipalities in Saskatchewan
    - List of municipalities in Yukon
- Costa Rica
  - Districts of Costa Rica
- Cuba
  - Municipalities of Cuba
- Dominica
  - List of towns and villages in Dominica
- Dominican Republic
  - List of municipalities of the Dominican Republic
- El Salvador
  - List of municipalities of El Salvador
- Grenada
  - List of cities in Grenada
- Guatemala
  - Municipalities of Guatemala
- Haiti
  - List of communes of Haiti
- Honduras
  - Municipalities of Honduras
- Jamaica
  - List of cities and towns in Jamaica
- Mexico
  - Municipalities of Mexico
- Nicaragua
  - Municipalities of Nicaragua
- Panama
  - Districts of Panama
- Saint Kitts and Nevis
  - List of cities and towns in Saint Kitts and Nevis
- Saint Lucia
  - List of cities in Saint Lucia
- Saint Vincent and the Grenadines
  - List of cities, towns and villages in Saint Vincent and the Grenadines
- Trinidad and Tobago
  - Municipalities of Trinidad and Tobago
- United States
  - List of cities in Alabama
  - List of cities in Alaska
  - List of cities in Arizona
  - List of cities in Arkansas
  - List of cities in California
  - List of cities in Colorado
  - List of cities in Connecticut
  - List of cities in Delaware
  - List of cities in Florida
  - List of cities in Georgia
  - List of cities in Hawaii
  - List of cities in Idaho
  - List of cities in Illinois
  - List of cities in Indiana
  - List of cities in Iowa
  - List of cities in Kansas
  - List of cities in Kentucky
  - List of cities in Louisiana
  - List of cities in Maine
  - List of cities in Maryland
  - List of cities in Massachusetts
  - List of cities in Michigan
  - List of cities in Minnesota
  - List of cities in Mississippi
  - List of cities in Missouri
  - List of cities in Montana
  - List of cities in Nebraska
  - List of cities in Nevada
  - List of cities in New Hampshire
  - List of cities in New Jersey
  - List of cities in New Mexico
  - List of cities in New York
  - List of cities in North Carolina
  - List of cities in North Dakota
  - List of cities in Ohio
  - List of cities in Oklahoma
  - List of cities in Oregon
  - List of cities in Pennsylvania
  - List of cities in Rhode Island
  - List of cities in South Carolina
  - List of cities in South Dakota
  - List of cities in Tennessee
  - List of cities in Texas
  - List of cities in Utah
  - List of cities in Vermont
  - List of cities in Virginia
  - List of cities in Washington
  - List of cities in West Virginia
  - List of cities in Wisconsin
  - List of cities in Wyoming
  - List of municipalities in American Samoa
  - List of municipalities in Guam
  - List of municipalities in Northern Mariana Islands
  - List of municipalities in Puerto Rico
  - List of municipalities in United States Virgin Islands

== South America ==
- Argentina
  - Municipalities of Argentina
- Bolivia
  - Municipalities of Bolivia
- Brazil
  - Municipalities of Brazil
- Chile
  - Municipalities of Chile
- Colombia
  - Municipalities of Colombia
- Ecuador
  - Municipalities of Ecuador
- Guyana
  - Municipalities of Guyana
- Paraguay
  - Municipalities of Paraguay
- Peru
  - Municipalities of Peru
- Suriname
  - Municipalities of Suriname
- Uruguay
  - Municipalities of Uruguay
- Venezuela
  - Municipalities of Venezuela
