= Ernest Dunlop =

Scottish bacteriologist

Ernest McMurchie Dunlop FRSE MC (1893–1969) was a Scottish bacteriologist who also served with distinction in the First World War, winning the Military Cross.

== Life ==
He was born in Glasgow on 15 November 1893 the son of Thomas Dunlop, a chemist in the Pollokshields district, and his wife Grace McFadyean. He attended Hutchesons' Grammar School and in 1910, aged 16, went to Glasgow University to study Medicine. He received distinctions in Anatomy and Physiology and also qualified in Gynaecology. In 1916 he won the Brunton Memorial Prize for Distinction in Medicine.

He then volunteered for the Royal Army Medical Corps his battalion being attached to the 14th battalion Worcestershire Regiment, landing in France on 21 June 1916. He was raised to Lieutenant on 9 August 1916. He reached the rank of Captain and was awarded the Military Cross on 1 January 1919 for bravery during the conflict.

In 1919 he returned to civilian life and gained a post at Glasgow University. In 1922 he began lecturing in Bacteriology. In 1932 he received a Chair in Bacteriology at Durham University and remained there until retiral in 1959.

In 1944 he was elected a Fellow of the Royal Society of Edinburgh. His proposers were Sir Robert Muir, Alexander Murray Drennan, and Thomas J. Mackie.

He retired to Ayrshire in his native Scotland and died there on 29 April 1969.
