= Pollokshields =

Area of Glasgow, Scotland

Coordinates: 55.8423°N 4.2850°W

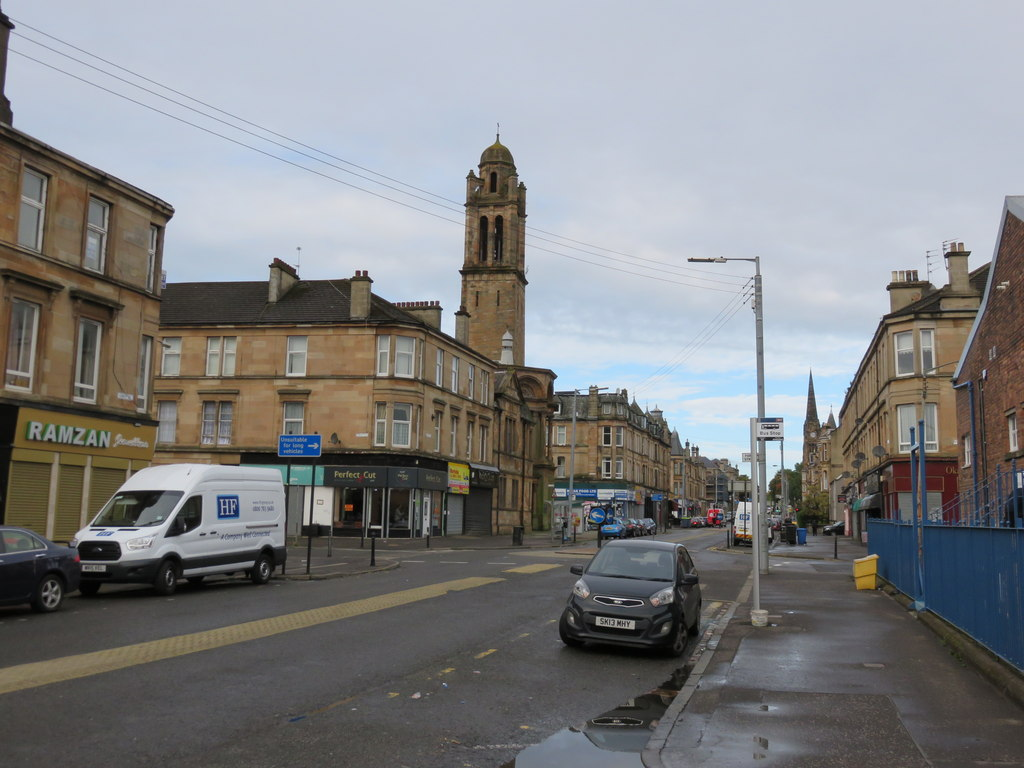
- Albert Drive, East Pollokshields

- Location within Glasgow
- Area: 1.59 km^{2} (0.61 sq mi)
- Population: 9,738 (2015)
  - Density: 6,125/km^{2} (15,860/sq mi)
- Community council: Pollkshields
- Council area: Glasgow City Council
- Lieutenancy area: Glasgow
- Country: Scotland
- Sovereign state: United Kingdom
- Post town: GLASGOW
- Postcode district: G41
- Dialling code: 0141
- Police: Scotland
- Fire: Scottish
- Ambulance: Scottish
- UK Parliament: Glasgow South West
- Scottish Parliament: Glasgow Southside

Pollokshields (Scottish Gaelic: Buthan Phollaig, Scots: Powkshiels) is an area in the Southside of Glasgow, Scotland. Its modern boundaries are largely man-made, being formed by the M77 motorway to the west and northwest with the open land of Pollok Country Park and the Dumbreck neighbourhood beyond, by the Inverclyde Line railway and other branches which separate its territory from the largely industrial areas of Kinning Park, Kingston and Port Eglinton, and by the Glasgow South Western Line running from the east to south, bordering Govanhill, Strathbungo, Crossmyloof and Shawlands residential areas. There is also a suburban railway running through the area.

Pollokshields is a conservation area which was developed in Victorian times according to a plan promoted by the original landowners, the Stirling-Maxwells of Pollok, whose association with the area goes as far back as 1270. The core of the area was constructed in two distinct and contrasting styles, with the western part consisting mainly of large villas with gardens along sweeping, undulating tree-lined boulevards, whereas the eastern part (once a separate burgh) is formed by three-storey sandstone tenements typical of many parts of the city from the era, arranged in a tight grid of streets on relatively flat ground. The former Glasgow Corporation Tramways workshops are in Pollokshields and were home to the Glasgow Museum of Transport from 1964 to 1987 and are home to Tramway since 1988.

== History ==
Pollokshields was established by the Stirling-Maxwell family in 1849, and was set out or 'feued' by the Edinburgh architect David Rhind. Many well-known Glaswegian architects contributed to its development, and it contains villas by Alexander 'Greek' Thomson among others. There are several contributions by contemporaries of Charles Rennie Mackintosh including a series of good 'Glasgow style' tenements by the architect Harry Clifford, who was also responsible for the 'A' listed Pollokshields Burgh Hall, in Scottish Baronial style. The building was inaugurated in 1890 along with the adjoining Maxwell Park, the land for which was given by Sir John Stirling-Maxwell of Nether Pollok in 1888.

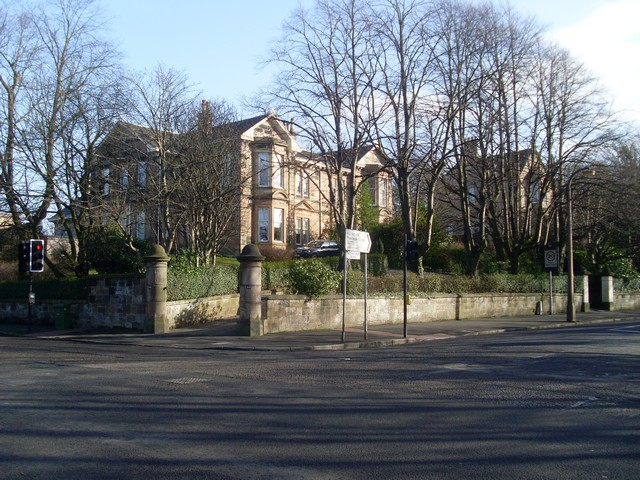
Villas on Nithsdale Road

Such was its early population growth, Pollokshields attained 'burgh' status in 1876. However, this ended in 1891 when, after being offered favourable tax terms, the residents of the burgh agreed for it to become a suburb of the growing city of Glasgow. The Victorian and Edwardian architecture and the parks of this area have remained almost untouched, leaving the feeling of a leafy Victorian suburb, while being well within the city.

In March 2004, local white youth Kriss Donald was abducted from Kenmure Street in Pollokshields, then tortured and murdered in a racially motivated attack. Five men of Pakistani descent, also from Pollokshields, were later jailed for the crime, four receiving life sentences. The case drew attention to the issue of Asian gang culture and associated crime and violence in the area.

In May 2021, residents came out to protest an attempt from the Home Office to detain two men living on Kenmure Street. Hundreds of people surrounded the van in the street to prevent it from moving, with one man lying under the van for nine hours until it was confirmed that the detainees were to be released. With the help of a lawyer and politicians, including Nicola Sturgeon who discussed it with the UK Home Office, the men were released to the local mosque and allowed back into their homes. The protest led to significant news coverage.

The area was subject to local youths causing disorder relating to fireworks in the period around Bonfire Night (5 November), to the extent that council approval was granted in 2024 for a Fireworks Control Zone (FCZ) to be issued prohibiting their use (the first of its kind in Glasgow); however, the deadline for submission of the relevant paperwork was missed. Although some explosives were seized by police and efforts made to clear streets of flammable debris, more widespread disorder was seen that year, including a car being set alight, rockets being fired at moving vehicles and the setting of a bonfire in the middle of Albert Drive which burned for several hours and had fireworks added to it periodically which exploded at random in the direction of residential homes.

== Education ==
In and around Pollokshields are four primary schools (Pollokshields Primary on Albert Drive; Glendale Primary and Glendale Gaelic School on a shared campus located on the south edge of Pollokshields; and St Albert's Primary on Maxwell Drive) and three secondary schools (Bellahouston Academy, located on the western edge of Pollokshields at the M77 motorway; Shawlands Academy in the Shawlands area approximately a mile south of Pollokshields; and Hutchesons Grammar School, a private school with its senior campus in Pollokshields and its junior and pre-school campus nearby). Craigholme School, another private institution with buildings on Nithsdale Road and St Andrews Drive, closed in 2020.

== Demographics ==
Pollokshields had a total population of 27,983 as of 2015, however this referred to the wider council ward encompassing several other neighbourhoods (Crossmyloof, Craigton, Strathbungo and parts of Shawlands).

The population is culturally diverse, with a significant Pakistani population.

== Architecture ==
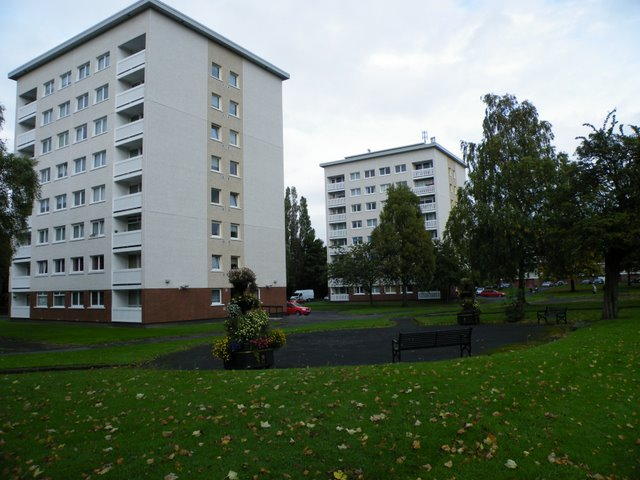
Refurbished 1960s apartment blocks at St Andrew's Crescent

The architecture in Pollokshields is predominantly a mixture of Victorian tenements and large detached and semi-detached properties dating back to the late 19th and early 20th centuries. One of the more significant residential developments outwith this style is a group of seven 1960s brutalist eight-storey cube-shaped blocks on either side of St Andrew's Drive (west of Shields Road) and an L-shaped complex of contemporary deck-access flats, managed by the Southside Housing Association and refurbished in the 2010s. At that time most of a larger deck-access complex on the south side of the road constructed in two adjoining 'T' shapes was demolished in stages to be replaced by new properties.

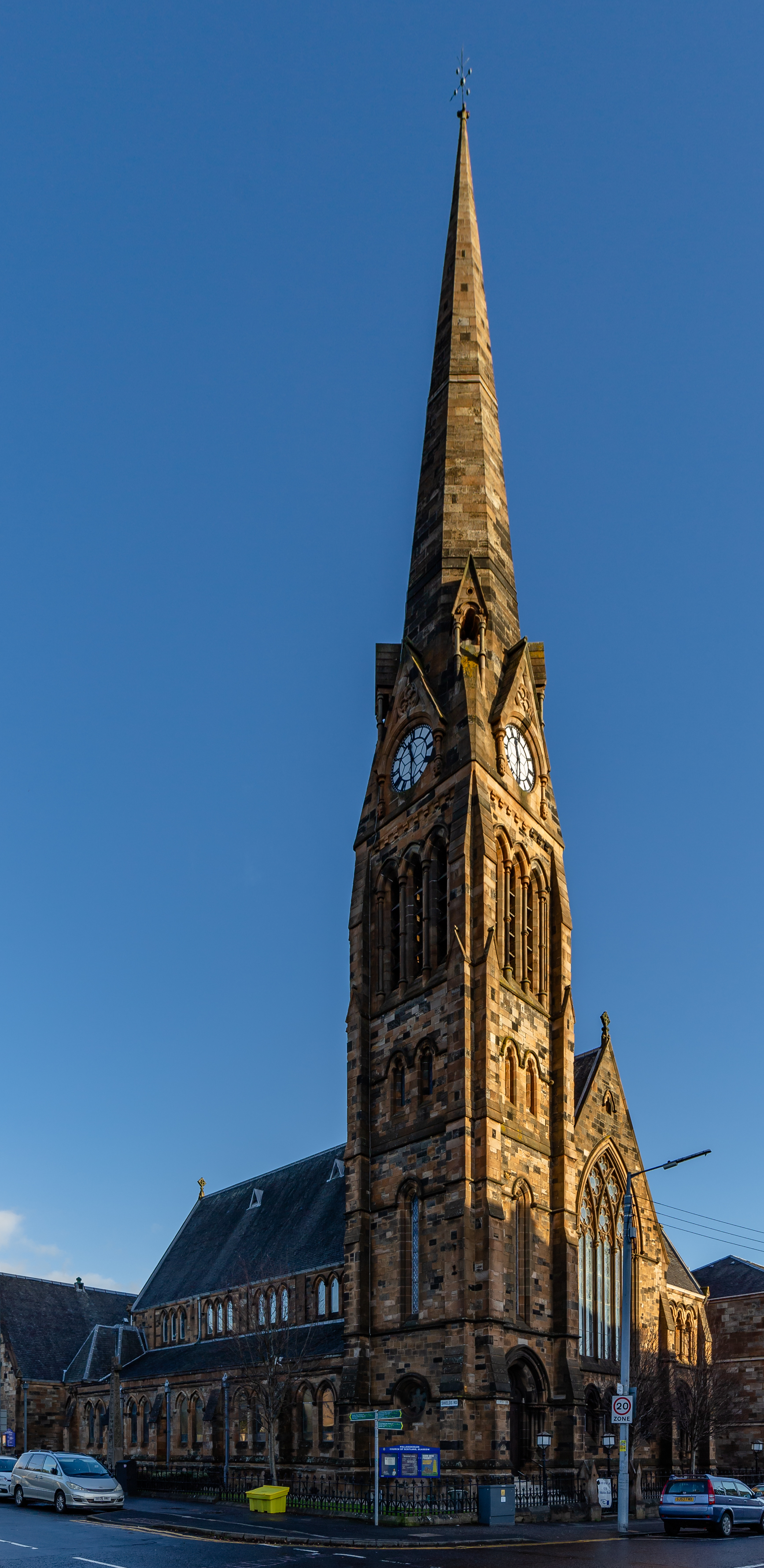
Pollokshields Church of Scotland

The Church of St Albert the Great in Pollokshields was originally built for a congregation of the United Presbyterian Church. The Italian Renaissance design by John B. Wilson was also used in another building, Stockwell Free Church, in 1887. St Albert's original title was Albert Road Church, after Queen Victoria's consort, Prince Albert, rather than the German saint of the same name who is the current patron. The Archdiocese of Glasgow acquired the church in 1965 for the new parish and with minimal interference to the original interior or exterior design, it was brought back into use as a church in 1967. The cream sandstone facade has a very attractive octagonal vestibule and tall bell tower. St Ninian's church is part of the Scottish Episcopal Church located on the corner of Albert Drive and Pollokshaws Road.

Pollokshields Parish Church of the Church of Scotland was built as Pollokshields Established Church by Robert Baldie in 1877–1878. The architecture is mixed Gothic with an early English tower with tabernacles above the broaches of the spire at the southwest comer of the building. The tower has a clock face on each of its four sides. The south (entrance) front has a large geometrical window above a row of trefoil-headed windows with stiff leaf capitals. The side aisles have twin lancet windows beneath the clerestory of triple lancet windows to the main church. The interior has aisle arcades formed by polished granite columns on high octagonal sandstone bases with French Gothic capitals supporting pointed arches beneath the clerestory windows and the high scissor-braced roof trusses. Each column cap is different. The timber roof of the side aisles and the main trusses add to the grandeur of the interior. The south balcony is reached by a staircase from the east porch. The deep chancel was remodelled in 1912–1914 with new organ, pulpit and communion table.

Sherbrooke St. Gilbert's Church is another Church of Scotland congregation. The church was built in 1894 and had to be rebuilt following a serious fire in 1994. It is located on Nithsdale Road, close to Dumbreck railway station.

=== Burgh Hall ===
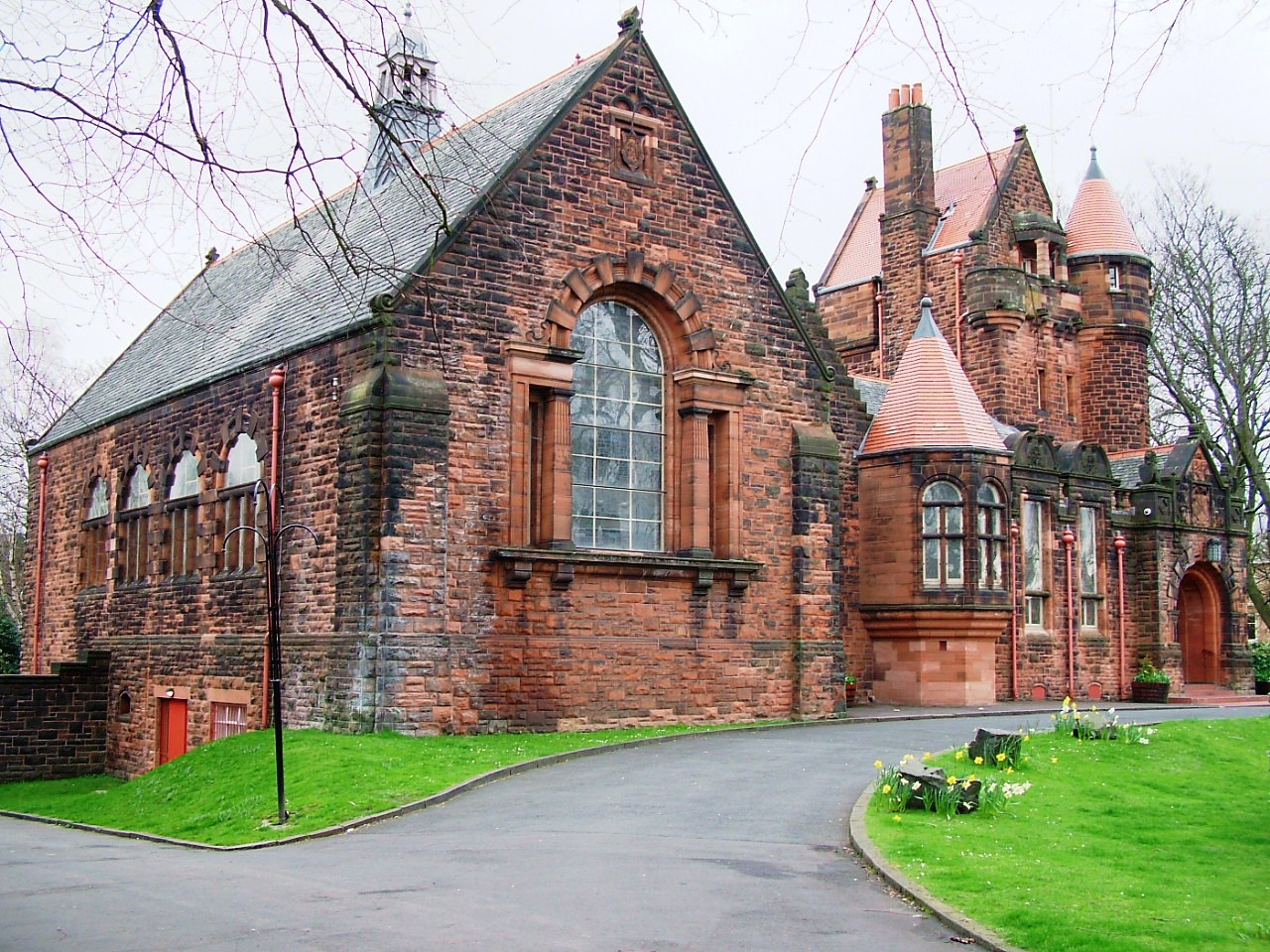
Pollokshields Burgh Hall

Pollokshields Burgh Hall was designed by Harry Clifford during the Scottish Renaissance in the late 19th century and is currently listed as a significant building of Pollokshields. Built in Ballochmyle Red Freestone, it was opened in 1890 by Sir John Stirling Maxwell, whose coat of arms is depicted in the entrance porch in the stone of the Hall and is recorded in marble in the floor. At one end of the building there is a high tower with a balcony. Throughout the building there are detailed stained-glass windows from the town of Pollokshields. The lodge house adjacent comprises two flats; the Sanitary Inspector and the Park Gardener used these facilities as living accommodation, and they are currently privately let by the Burgh Hall trust. In 1891 the Burgh Hall passed into the hands of Glasgow Council when the city extended its boundaries. In 1938 the back of the building was enlarged; this meant that the last gallery in the spacious hall had to be sacrificed in order to permit the building of the extension.

By 1975 it was being used by the Social Work Department of Strathclyde Regional Council as an occupational day centre. In 1982 a decision was taken to sell it on the open market. This proved controversial—the residents of Pollokshields protested due to its connection to the heritage of the town and the historical significance to the area. Further protests ensued, so a charitable trust was formed to ensure that the building would continue to be publicly owned. The Trust acquired the building for £1 in 1986. Only in 1991 was the title transferred, with the condition that the derelict lodge house be restored within five years. Historic Scotland supported the heritage campaign, as well as other organisations such as the Heritage Lottery Fund, Glasgow City Council, and the Glasgow Development Agency. The lodge house and the ground floor of the Hall were completely refurbished and reopened around 1997. The lower ground floor has since attracted further funding and what was once little more than cellar space has been converted to a contemporary conference room, which can be directly accessed from the outside.

== Sports ==
Clydesdale Cricket Club is located at Titwood on the periphery of Pollokshields. Founded in Kinning Park in 1848 by Archibald Campbell, it was formed by members of two previous clubs which played on Glasgow Green, to cater for the burgeoning residential developments south of the river Clyde. It is now the oldest surviving team sports club in Glasgow. On moving to Pollokshields in 1873, the club sold its previous grounds in Kinning Park to the world famous football club called Rangers. At that time, the club also fielded a football team, Clydesdale, which were runners-up to Queen's Park in the first Scottish Cup final in 1874, after many associated with the club had been instrumental in the foundation of the Scottish Football Association.

== Transport ==
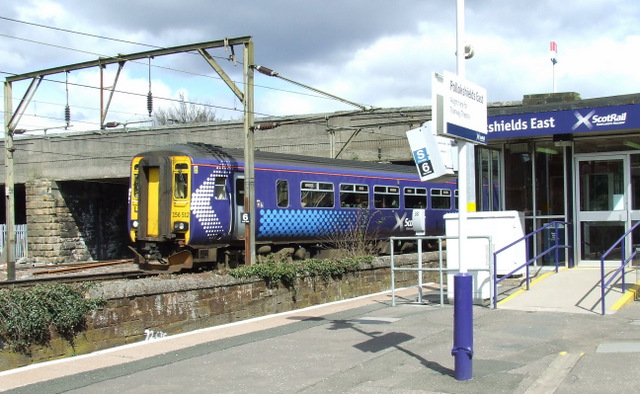
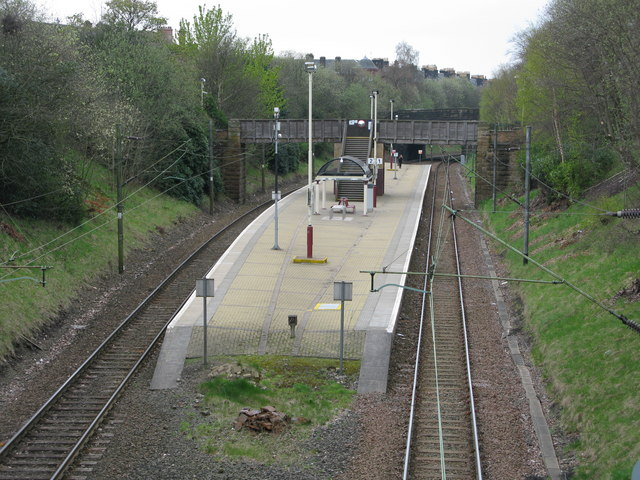
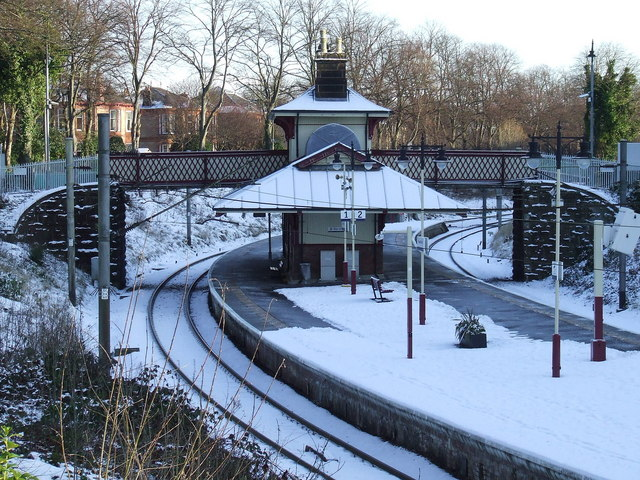
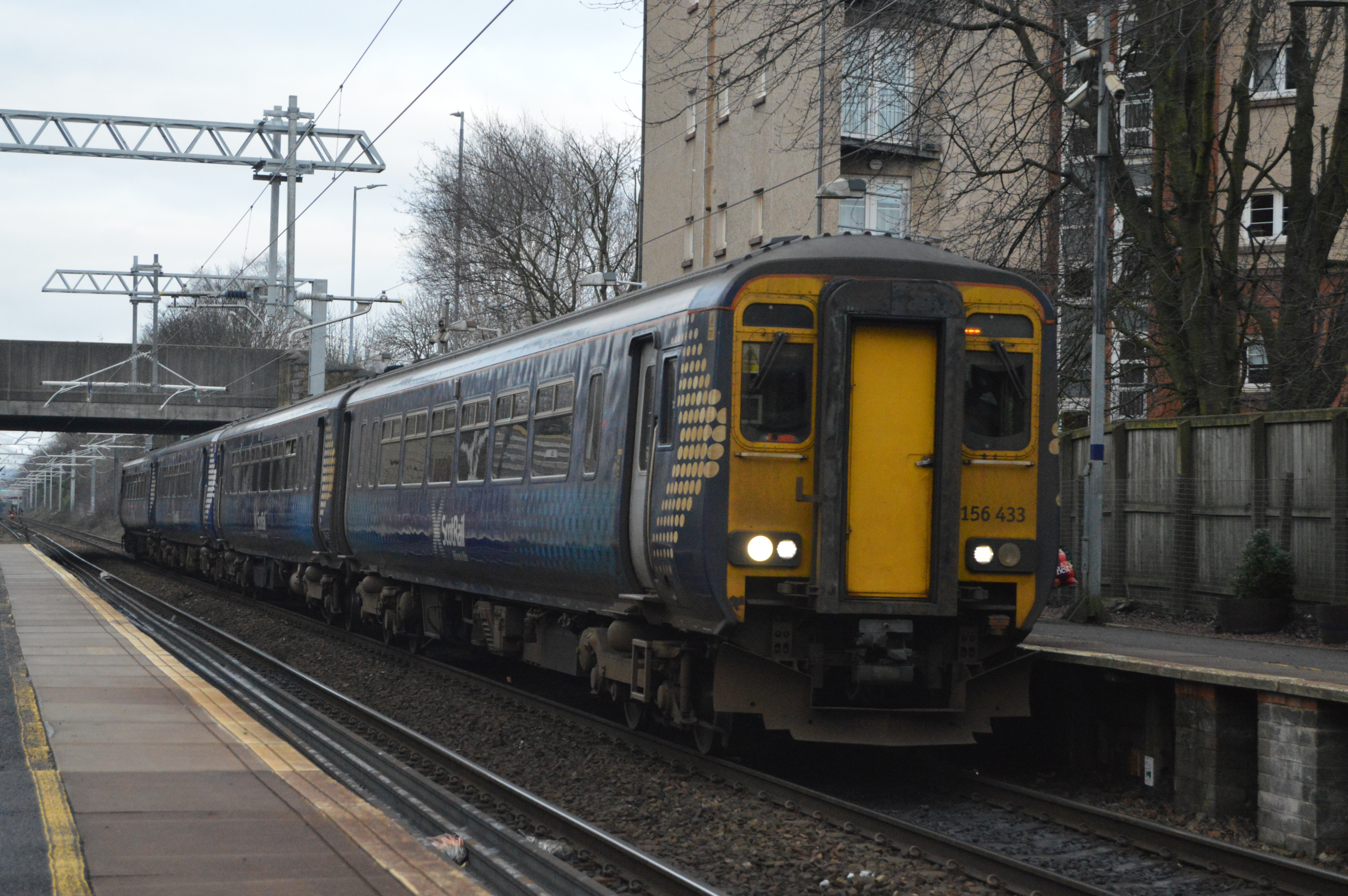
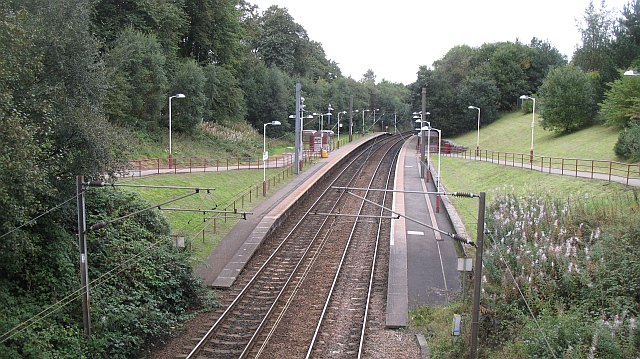
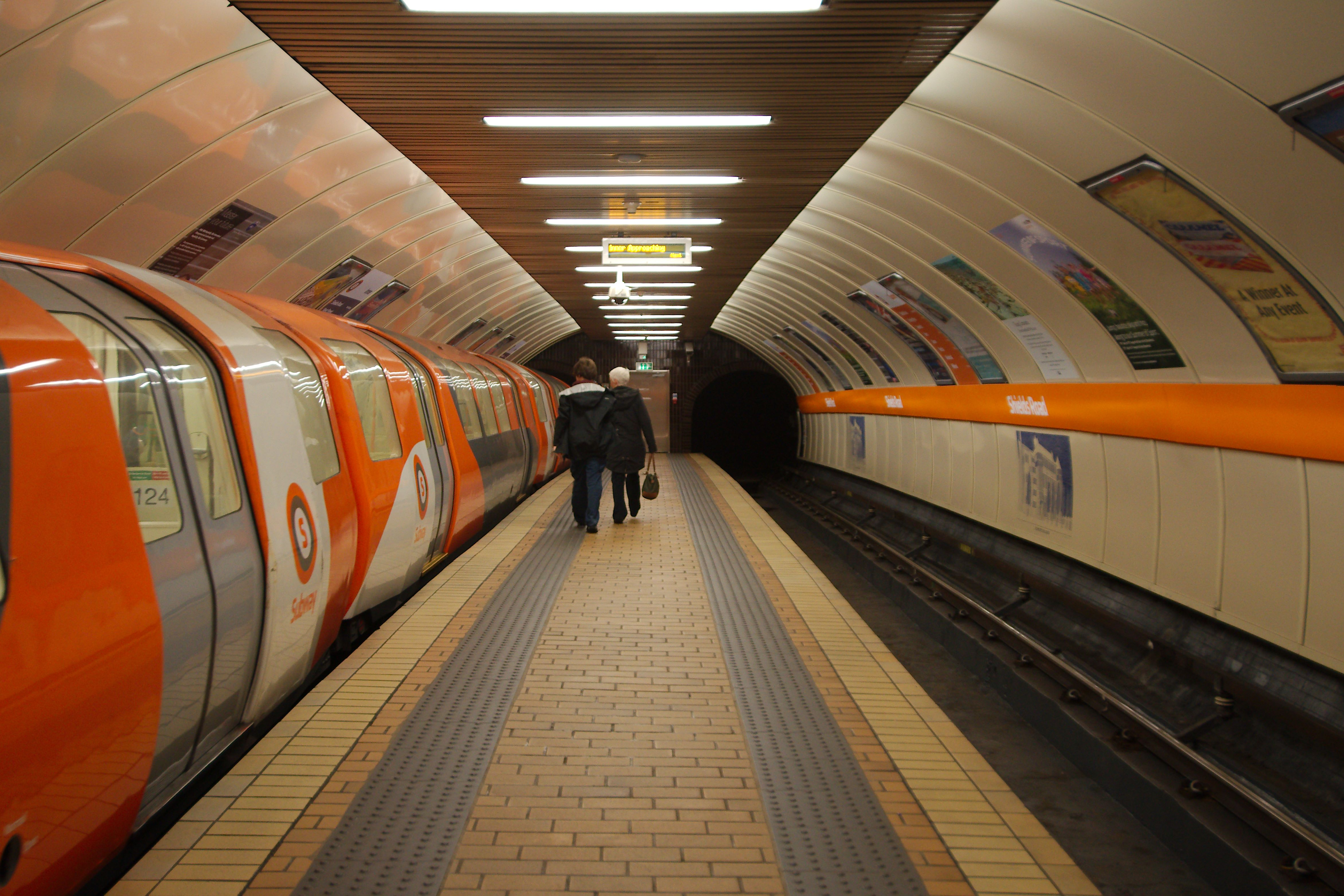
Rail and Subway Stations in the area

Pollokshields has three open railway stations: Maxwell Park, Pollokshields East and Pollokshields West, all on the Cathcart Circle Line. Crossmyloof on the Glasgow South Western Line and Dumbreck on the Paisley Canal Line are also nearby. Closed railway stations include Pollokshields and Strathbungo.

The area is also served by Shields Road subway station on the Glasgow Subway, located in a non-residential area to the north, and by numerous bus routes.

For road transport, the M8, M74, and M77 motorways all serve Pollokshields, while the A77 road runs along the eastern edge of the area.

== Notable residents ==
Notable people who have lived in Pollokshields include:

- Professor Ernest Dunlop – bacteriologist and Lieutenant during the first world war
- Albert Alexander Gray – physician and otologist
- John MacCormick – Nationalist politician
- Rustie – musician
- Eric Woolfson – songwriter and musician; co-creator of the Alan Parsons Project
- Dougie Donnelly – Scottish media personality
- Reverend Thomas Niven – Moderator of the General Assembly of the Church of Scotland in 1906
- Tom Urie – actor
- Raymond McGinley – musician
- Jane Haining – Church of Scotland missionary who protected Hungarian Jewish children during World War II lived in the area as an adult; killed by the Nazis in Auschwitz
- Frankie Boyle – comedian

== See also ==
- Glasgow Museum of Transport
- Pollokshields Library
- Shieling
- Tramway
