= Pollokshields East =

Coordinates: 55.840°N 4.273°W

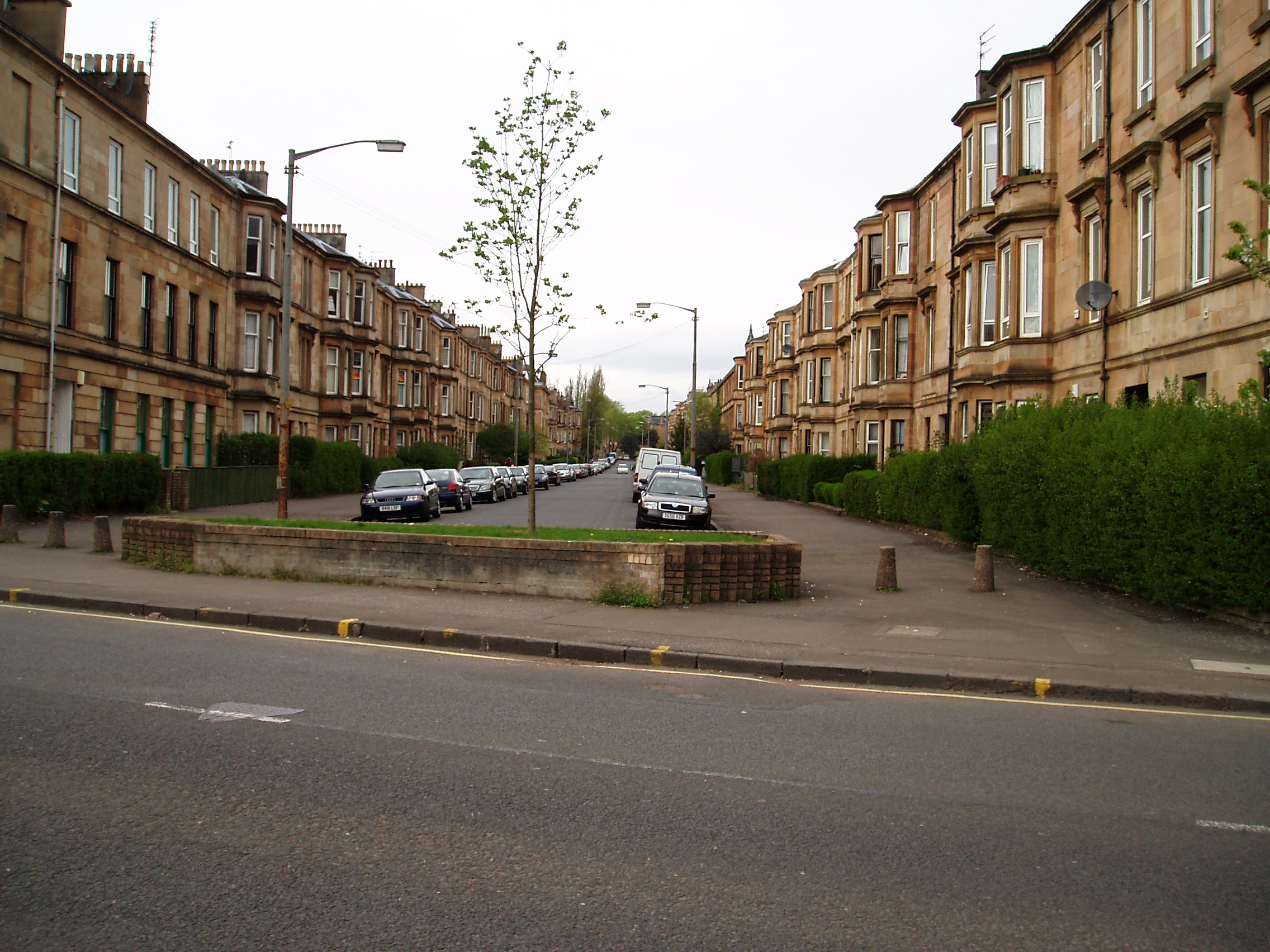
Modern view of Leven Street in what was Pollokshields East

Pollokshields East was a police burgh in Scotland that had a brief independent existence in the 19th century. The burgh was created within the Govan parish in the county of Renfrewshire in 1880. Bartholomew's Gazetteer of the British Isles (1887) states that Pollokshields East had a population of 4,360. Along with the neighbouring burgh of Pollokshields, it was officially absorbed into the city of Glasgow in 1891, the two burghs being induced to agree by the promise of taxation concessions. Unlike its neighbour, where development was restricted by feu to residential villas, Pollokshields East was a more working class area with commercial and industrial developments, although the tenements in the district were among the best-appointed in the city. Land use in modern Pollokshields still reflects the different histories of the two former burghs.
