= MC-VA =

Scottish rapper, record producer (born 1986)

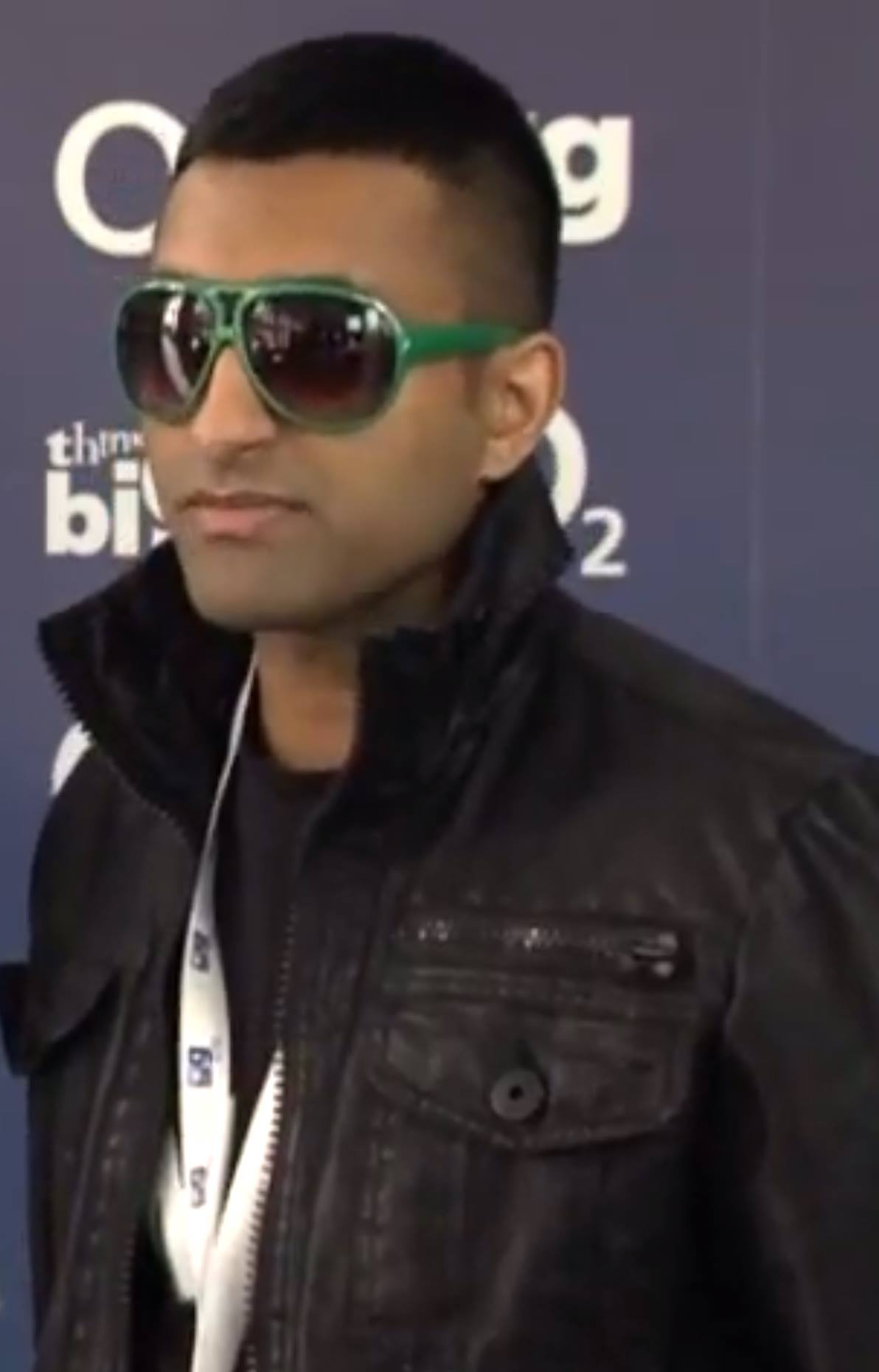
- MC-VA at O2 Think Big Tour, 2012

Background information
- Born: Mohammad Akhtar; 6 October 1986 (age 40); Govan, Glasgow, Scotland
- Genres: Hip hop, UK Hip Hop, Grime
- Occupations: Rapper, singer, entrepreneur
- Instruments: Rapping, vocals
- Years active: 2003–present
- Label: JABA Entertainment
- Website: mc-va.com

Mohammad Akhtar, better known by his stage name MC-VA (sometimes styled mcva) is a Scottish rapper, record producer, songwriter and entrepreneur originating from Glasgow, Scotland.

== Early life ==
MC-VA was born in Glasgow into a family that emigrated from Pakistan. He grew up in a council house, living on the estates of Govanhill, Pollokshields, Nitshill, Ibrox and Govan.

He faced struggles first-hand due to racial differences in Glasgow and on one occasion was left unconscious by an attack by three local gang members. His father was in and out of prison and died when he was fifteen. MC-VA and his siblings were raised by their mother. He attended King's Park Secondary School, graduating in 2002.

== Career ==
MC-VA began creating music in his early teens. He started out in music production with sequencing software hip-hop eJay. Using samples he would make his earliest forms of music releasing the single "Childhood" and later following up with the album "The World is a Bad Place" which themes included his troubled upbringing, violence in Glasgow also his aspirations for a better quality of life.

== 2009 – 2012 The Neds ==
In 2009, MC-VA partnered with Glasgow rap artist Gav Livz. They met at the same recording studio, Core Studios, in Glasgow city centre. After discussing influences and aspirations The Neds was born. The Neds released "Double 6's" album. They released four singles, Whistle For'a Hottie, In The Air, Swagger and Goodbye. With each release they would film and edit the music videos themselves, which were published on YouTube. The duo established a very specific sound with heavily distinguished Glasgow accents. The release of these four videos led to over 250,000 views on YouTube. This gained recognition within the urban scene and caught the attention of various press putting them in the category of the "Class of 2010" acts to make it. They featured alongside Tango in the Attic, Alex Gardner, Unicorn Kid, Pearl & The Puppets, Tommy Reilly and Twin Atlantic.

They were nominated for a Scottish Alternative Music Award (SAMA) in the category of best Urban Recording of the year. The duo supported acts such as Tinchy Stryder, Donae’o, Chipmunk, Killa Kela and Sway. They have also performed at various festivals such as The Edinburgh Fringe, West End and also headlined King Tut's Summer Nights. Alongside producing music the duo would also venture in merchandising, using their brand logo N.E.D on various t-shirts, hats and other merchandise. This led to a contract with HMV to stock the N.E.D merchandise nationwide. Shortly after this the duo would be challenged with a legal battle involving the N.E.D trademark from an American company who were trading under the same name. Due to complications and differences on how the case would be undertaken the duo would split even though the case was won in the end.

== 2012–present: MC-VA ==
MC-VA was picked up after the release of Double 6's by Steven Malcolmson a songwriter signed by BMG Rights Management/Major 3rd Music, credits include Lemar, Ellie Goulding and Kylie Minogue, as well as writing for X Factor finalists. The two have been working in the studio and this led to him songwriting with music production team Biffco writing alongside the likes of Richard "Biff" Stannard and Ash Howes.

== Discography ==
=== Studio albums ===
Title	Album details	Peak chart positions	Sales
Title	Album details	UK	Sales
Double 6's	Released: 11 October 2010; Label: White Label; Formats: CD, Digital download	—	UK: 10,000+

=== Singles ===
Title	Year	Peak chart positions	Album
Title	Year	UK	Album
"In The Air"	2010	—	Double 6's
"Whistle For'a Hottie"	2010	—	Double 6's
"Swagger"	2010	—	Double 6's
"Goodbye"	2010	—	Double 6's

== Awards and nominations ==
Year	Organisation	Award	Result
2011	Scottish Alternative Music Awards	Urban Recording of the Year	Nominated
