= Gav Livz =

Scottish music artist and businessman (born 1988)

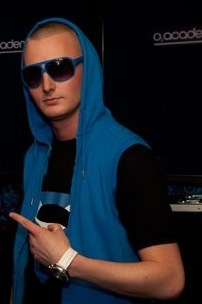
- Gav Livz at the O2 ABC in Glasgow

Background information
- Also known as: Gav Livz
- Born: Gavin Paul Livingston; 24 May 1988 (age 38); Glasgow, Scotland
- Genres: Hip Hop, Dance & Pop
- Occupations: Musician, songwriter, Mixing engineer and Website designer and Roaster
- Label: Scheme to a Dream Entertainment
- Website: gavlivz.com

Gavin Livingston, better known by his stage name Gav Livz (born 24 May 1988), is a Glasgow-born music artist and businessman. He is the founder and director of Scheme to a Dream Entertainment. Livz is primarily known for his collaboration with fellow hip hop artist MC-VA conforming a Hip Hop duo; The Neds. They gained recognition within the urban scene and caught the attention of various press such as The Scottish Sun putting them in the category of the "Class of 2010" acts to make it. They featured alongside Twin Atlantic, Alex Gardner, Unicorn Kid, Tommy Reilly and Tango in the Attic.

== Biography ==
=== Early life and education ===
Livz attended Holyrood Secondary School from 2000 until he dropped out in 2004 to pursue a music career. He attended the University of Glasgow to complete a qualification in The Business of Popular Music.

== Music career ==
=== 2003–2008: Beginnings ===
Livz' recordings date back to 2003, in 2006 he signed to Up North Records to create his debut album The Octagon. Shortly after, his main appearance resulted in a tour of the Czech Republic in 2006 with De La Soul. His pseudonym Gav Livz revives from his full name.

=== 2009–2012: The Neds ===
In 2009, Livz partnered with fellow Glaswegian rap artist Mohammad Akhtar, known as MC-VA. After discussing music and business, both decided to make music using their Scottish twang, The Neds was created. The Neds released four singles; Swagger, Whistle for'a Hottie, Goodbye and In The Air followed by releasing an album called Double 6's. Gav Livz and MC-VA sourced, directed, filmed and edited their releases themselves, releasing them on YouTube. The Hip-Hop duo established a specific sound with heavily distinguished Glaswegian accents, gaining recognition through national press. The Neds were nominated for a Scottish Alternative Music Award (SAMA)in 2011, category of Best Urban Recording of the Year. The duo supported Tinchy Stryder, Chipmunk, Sway, Killa Kela and Donae'o. In 2000, they headlined King Tut's Summer Nights Festival.

=== 2013–present: business and solo career ===
In 2013, Gav Livz decided to pursue music as a solo artist and work on building his music hub and record label Scheme to a Dream Entertainment. He then released his mixtape Gav Still Livz Volume II followed by the single Bucky Bottle which accumulated 230,000 YouTube views.

== Discography ==
Title	Album details	Sales
Double 6's	Released: 11 October 2010; Label: White Label; Formats: CD, digital download	UK: 10,000+

Title	Year	Album
In The Air	2012	Double 6's
Whistle For'a Hottie	2012	Double 6's
Goodbye	2012	Double 6's
Swagger	2012	Double 6's

== Awards and nominations ==
Year	Organisation	Award	Result
2011	Scottish Alternative Music Awards	Urban Recording of the Year	Nominated
