= Dan Drummond =

Scottish footballer (1891–1949)

Personal information
- Full name: Daniel Gilmour Drummond
- Date of birth: 27 April 1891
- Place of birth: Govanhill, Scotland
- Date of death: 1 March 1949 (aged 57)
- Place of death: Millport, Scotland
- Position: Outside right

Senior career*
Years	Team	Apps	(Gls)
1910–1913	Queen's Park	69	(6)
1913–1919	Motherwell	10	(1)
- * Club domestic league appearances and goals

Daniel Gilmour Drummond (27 April 1891 – 1 March 1949) was a Scottish professional footballer who played in the Scottish League for Queen's Park and Motherwell as an outside right.

== Personal life ==
In November 1915, over a year after Britain's entry into the First World War, Drummond enlisted in the Royal Naval Volunteer Reserve and was commissioned in April 1917. In November 1917, while serving with the Royal Naval Division, he was wounded in the left leg and evacuated to Seafield War Hospital, Leith. Drummond was demobbed in February 1919 and the leg wound ended his football career.
