= Govanhill Baths =

Public bathhouse in Scotland

Coordinates: 55.8383°N 4.26319°W

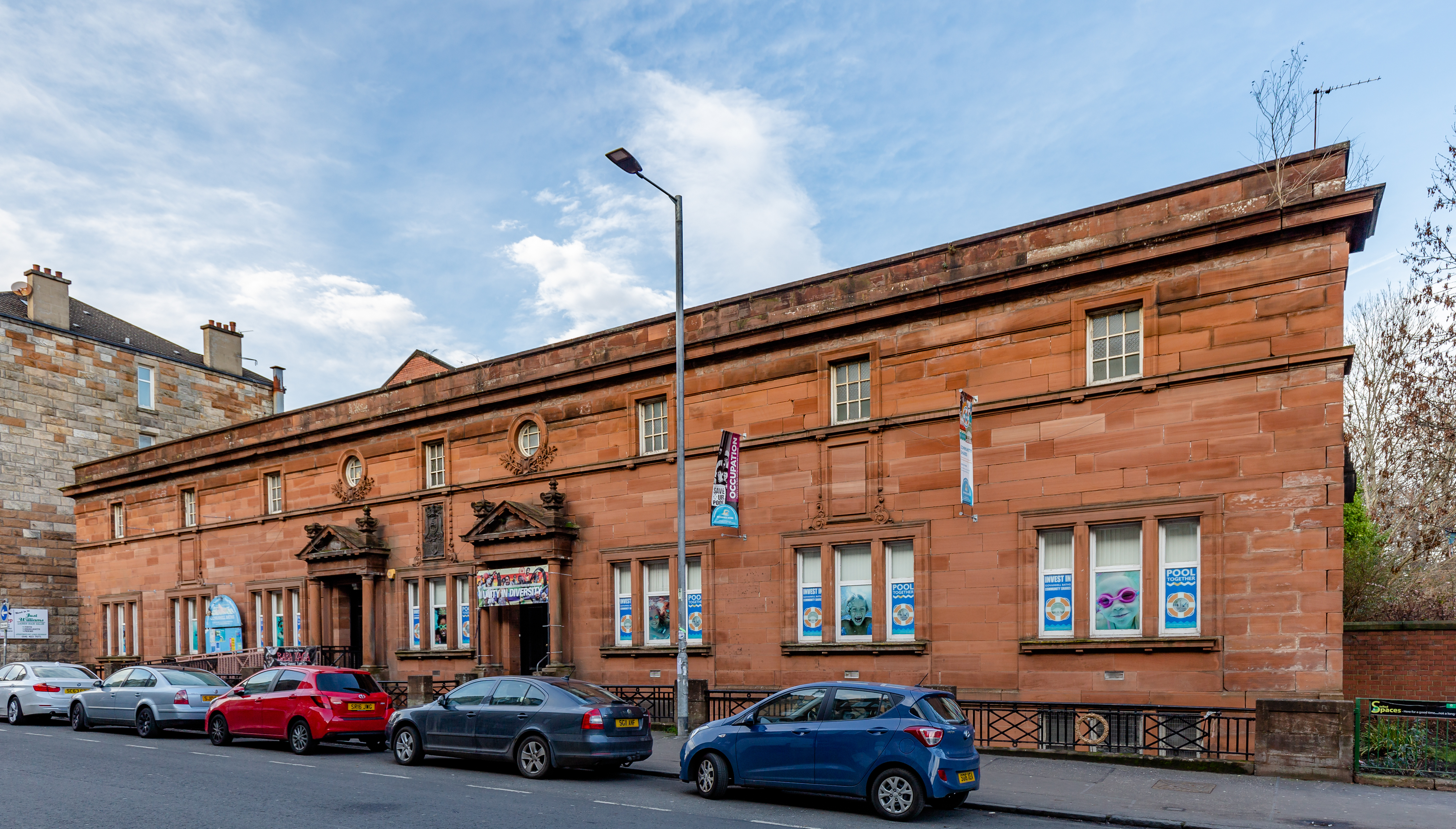
Govanhill Baths

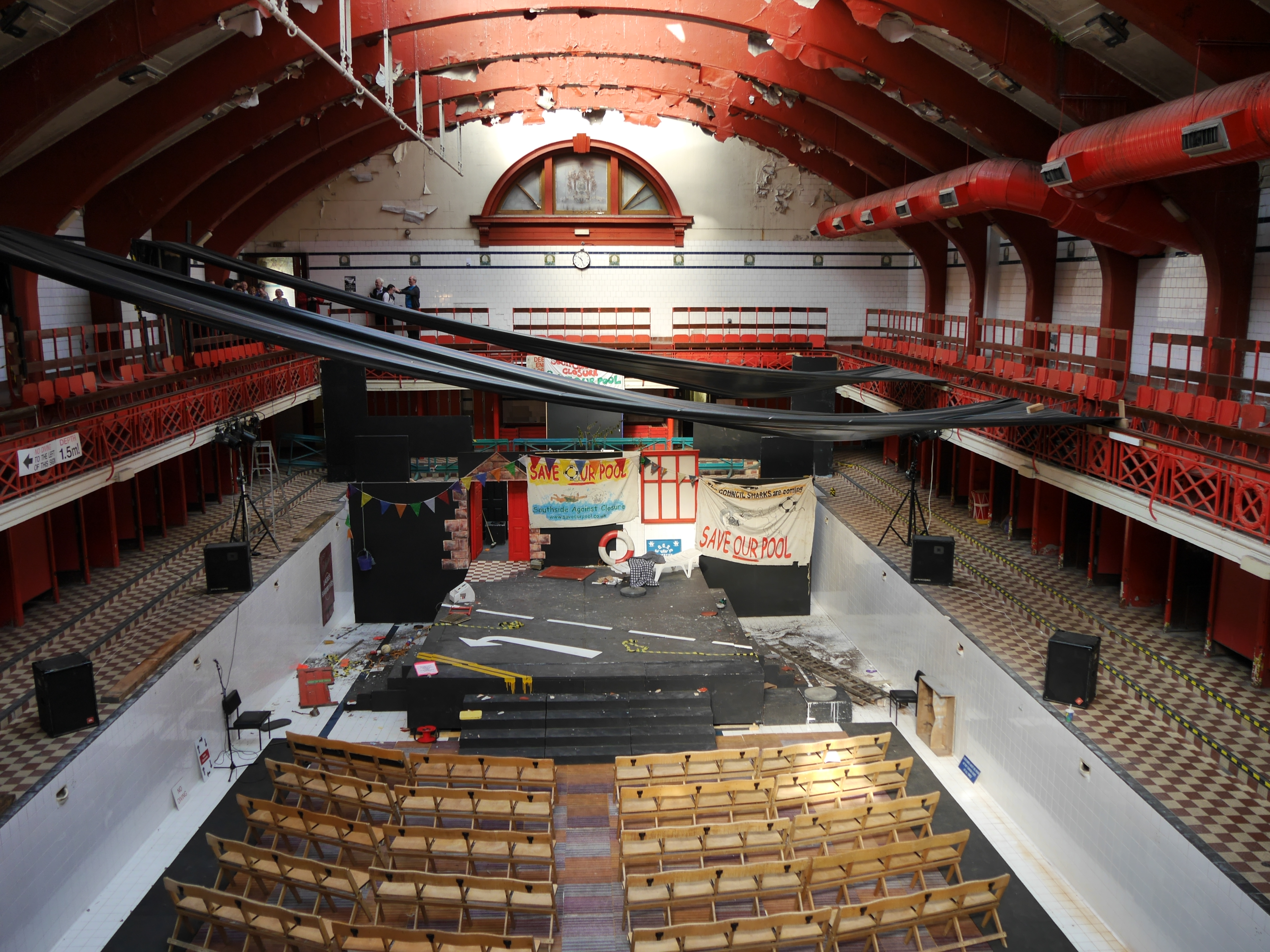
Main pool

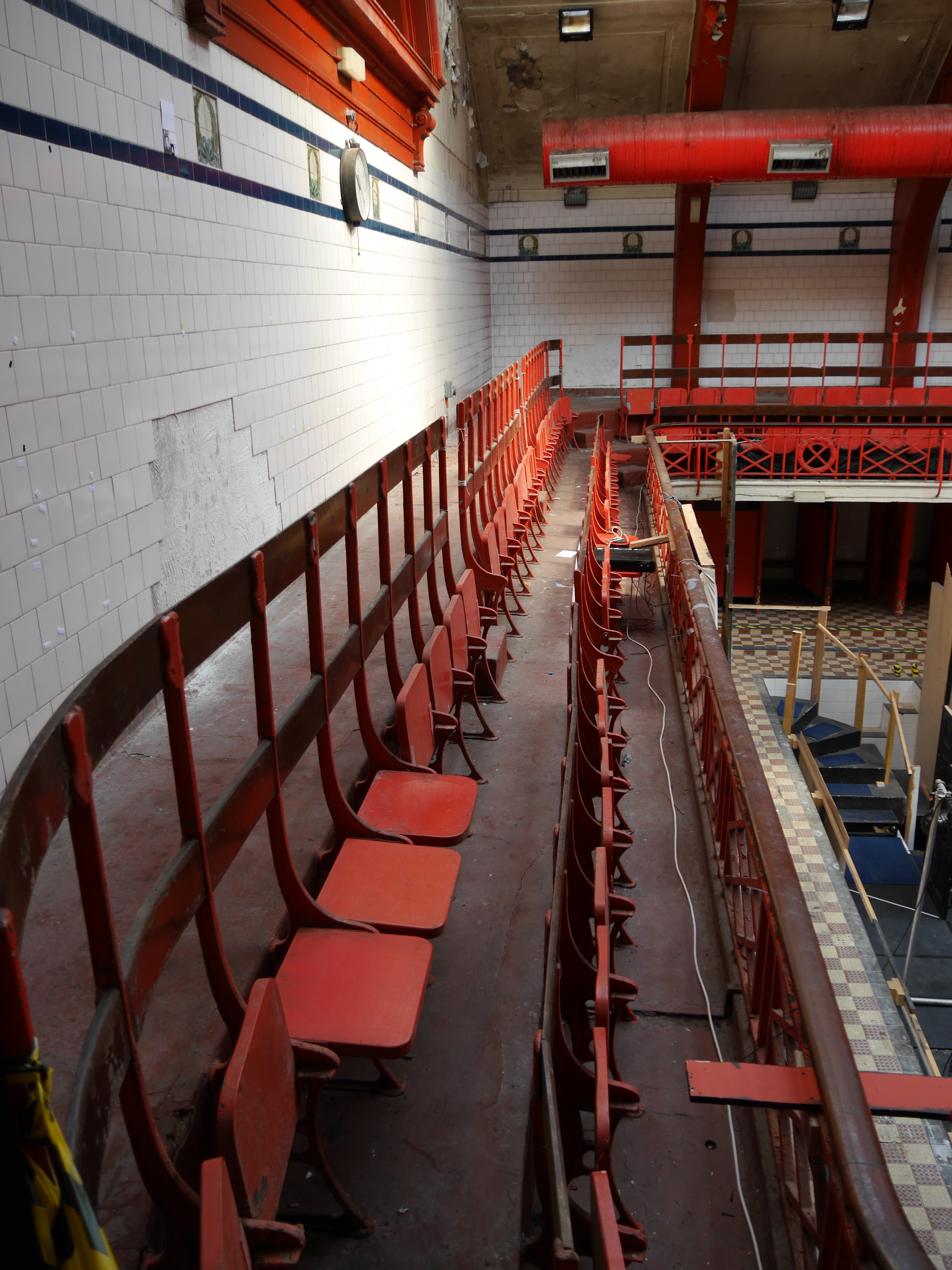
Main pool, spectator seating

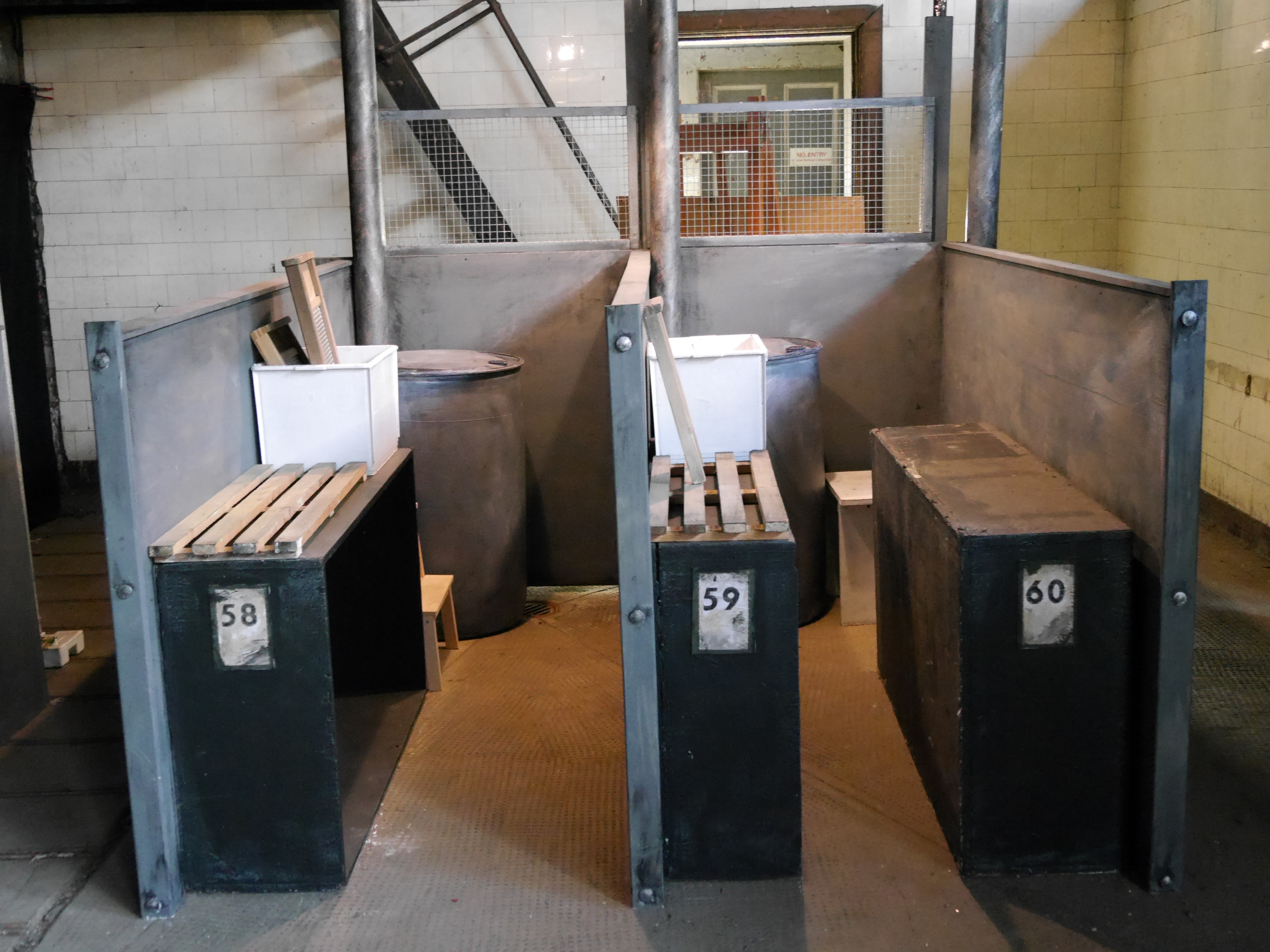
The "steamie"

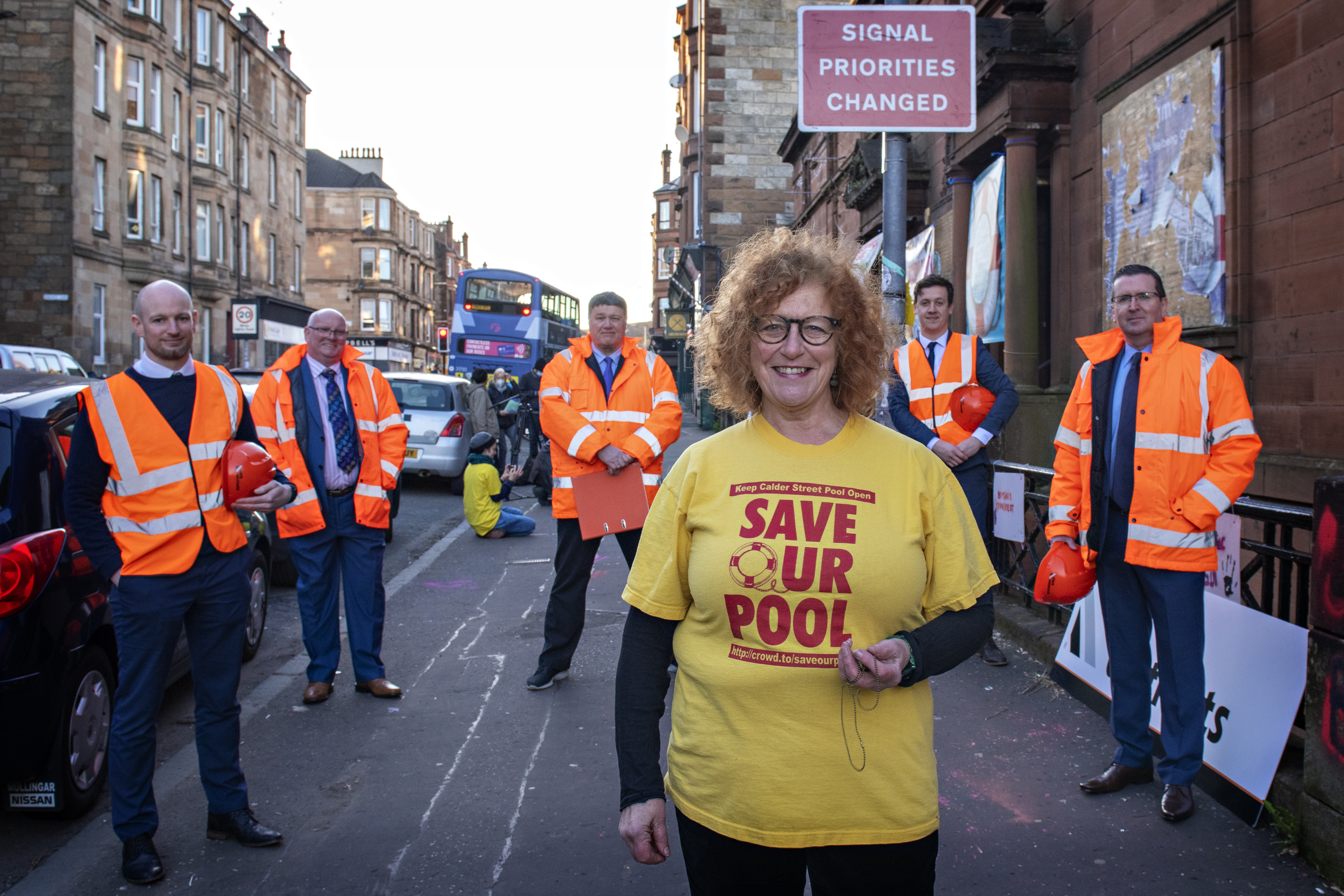
Refurbishment work begins

Govanhill Baths is a Category B listed Edwardian public bathhouse at 99 Calder Street, Govanhill, Glasgow, Scotland, designed by the architect A.B. McDonald and opened between 1912 and 1917. External refurbishment was completed in 2023. The building itself is currently closed for refurbishment works, with an opening date unknown and more funding required. Govanhill Baths Community Trust operates from an office at 126 Calder Street, across the road from the baths building. The campaign to save the baths from closure began in 2001, with an occupation of the building from 17 March until 7 August of that year. This is the longest occupation of a public building in British history.

== Design ==
Govanhill Baths is Glasgow's last surviving Edwardian public bathhouse. The building contained hot baths in the upper storey and three swimming pools on the ground floor. There was a seating gallery around one of the pools for spectators attending events such as galas. The wash house, or "steamie", at the rear of the building, was converted to a launderette in 1971.

== History ==
The foundation stone for the new baths and wash-house was laid on 3 July 1914 by the Lord Provost of Glasgow, Sir Daniel Macaulay Stevenson. An important function of the building in the early years was to provide clothes-washing facilities for local people whose tenement homes typically had no such facilities. Most homes in the area also lacked bathing facilities. Local rumour has it that the baths were used as a temporary mortuary for casualties from bombing during World War II.

== Closure ==
The closure of the baths was announced in the Glasgow Evening Times on 6 January 2001. Glasgow City Council argued that the baths had too little use and were too expensive to refurbish and keep open. The campaign to save the baths began almost straight away, and resulted in a community protest occupation of the building from 17 March until 7 August that year. This is the longest occupation of a public building in British history. Sheriff's officers accompanied by mounted police finally removed the protesters and shuttered the windows and doors with steel. A picket line remained outside the baths for the following year, supported by local community donations.

== Govanhill Baths Community Trust ==
Govanhill Baths Community Trust (GBCT) was formally constituted in 2005, and since then has been campaigning to reopen the baths as a "Wellbeing Centre", supported by community trust initiative, external funding, and subscribing members. The trust manages community well-being projects and produces a newsletter.

== Since closure ==
Since its closure in 2001, Govanhill Baths has been the site of a variety of events meant to campaign for and promote awareness, including theatre and musical performances, art installations, and a skate-park. These events sped up action to reopen the pools, which began experiencing severe decay to the interior.

In 2012, the smallest of the three pools, the "teaching" pool, was reopened and locals were interviewed expressing relief and recounting long memories of the bath house. This step was financed by the National Theatre of Scotland for use in their production, Lifeguard. A three-step plan was made to transform the building with Turkish and sauna suites, an allotment, a community café and music venue. Some had to be turned away from the front doors when they arrived with towels and swimming gear as the initial refilling was a test of the pool's integrity to confirm its viability for returning to use.

The baths have not only been used for swimming. The building was a planned venue for the Big Huge Poetry Splash in 2012, part of National Poetry Day, and the following year the Baths hosted its first marriage ceremony. Artists who have exhibited at the baths include Anthea Hamilton and Nicholas Byrne, as part of the 2014 Glasgow International biennial visual arts festival. In 2019, Ann Vance created a pastel portrait of Jessie Stephen and a monotype portrait of Margaret Skinnider for their Govanhill Women's Suffrage Project.

GBCT was recently the subject of OURS, a short film celebrating community land ownership. OURS was made by Written in Film with assistance from Patrick Rooney, commissioned by Community Land Scotland as part of their Urban Journeys in Community Ownership project and supported by The Stove Network. The film premiered on 21 March 2021 as part of Govanhill Baths' "Occupy! Occupy! Occupy!" Programme, celebrating 20 years of the occupation of Govanhill Baths.

== Today ==
External refurbishment was completed in 2023. The Baths are currently closed for refurbishment works until reopening. Govanhill Baths Community Trust operates from an office at 126 Calder Street, across the road from the baths building.

=== Community Programmes ===
In addition to health and wellness initiatives, GBCT offers a range of community outreach and arts programmes. It also runs: the People's Pantry, a membership-based organisation where people can purchase food at subsidised rates; The Deep End, an arts space providing artists studios, workshop spaces and room hire; Govanhill Youth Club, providing activities for local children.
