= A. B. McDonald =

Scottish architect and engineer

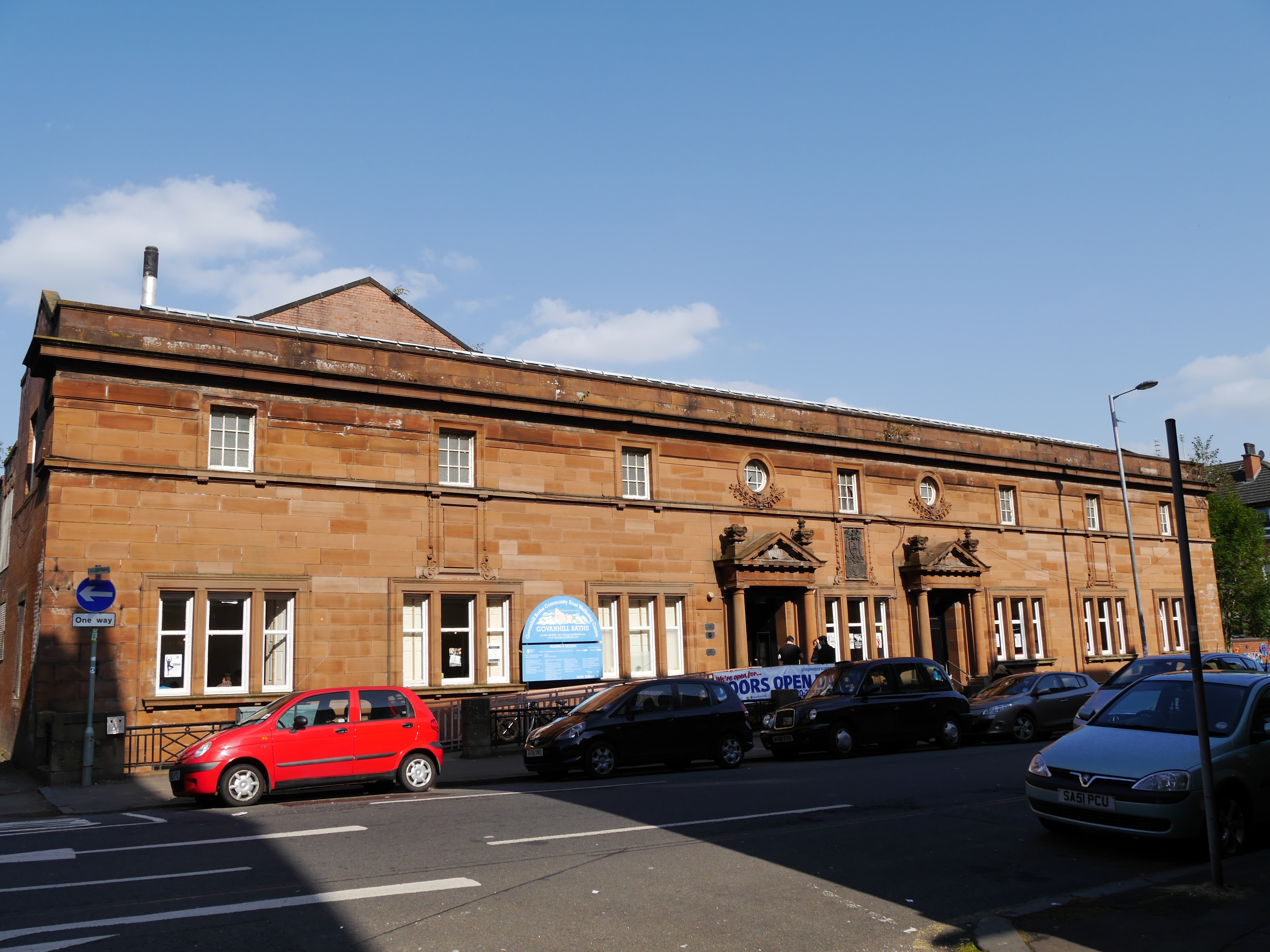
Govanhill Baths, completed in 1917, was McDonald's last major project before his death in 1915

Alexander Beith McDonald (12 August 1847 - 31 October 1915) was a Scottish architect, who served as City Engineer and Surveyor in Glasgow Corporation's Office of Public Works between 1890 and 1914.

== Early life ==
Born in Stirling in 1847, McDonald was articled at the age of 16 to the land surveyors and civil engineers Smith & Wharrie of Glasgow in 1862, and studied engineering, natural philosophy and mathematics at Glasgow University.

== Career ==
At the age of 23, McDonald joined the Glasgow Corporation's Office of Public Works under City Architect, John Carrick in 1870, and soon became involved in development of a wide variety of municipal projects as part of the City Improvement Trust, such as police stations, fire stations, markets, baths, washhouses and tenements. He married Janet Napier at St Giles' Cathedral in Edinburgh in 1877, and had a son born in 1878. After Carrick's death, he was appointed City Engineer in 1890, then City Surveyor in 1891. McDonald retired from the Office of Works in 1914.

He was responsible for the layout of Bellahouston Park in 1896.

He was the architect for Govanhill Baths, which opened after his death in 1917.

== Death ==
McDonald died on 31 October 1915 aged 68 at his home in 29 Kersland Street, Glasgow of a cerebral haemorrhage resulting from a head injury sustained in a fall from a Sauchiehall Street tramcar. He was buried in the Western Necropolis. Nine months later his only son, Alexander McDonald Jr. was killed at the Battle of the Somme on 30 July 1916, aged 38.

== Buildings ==
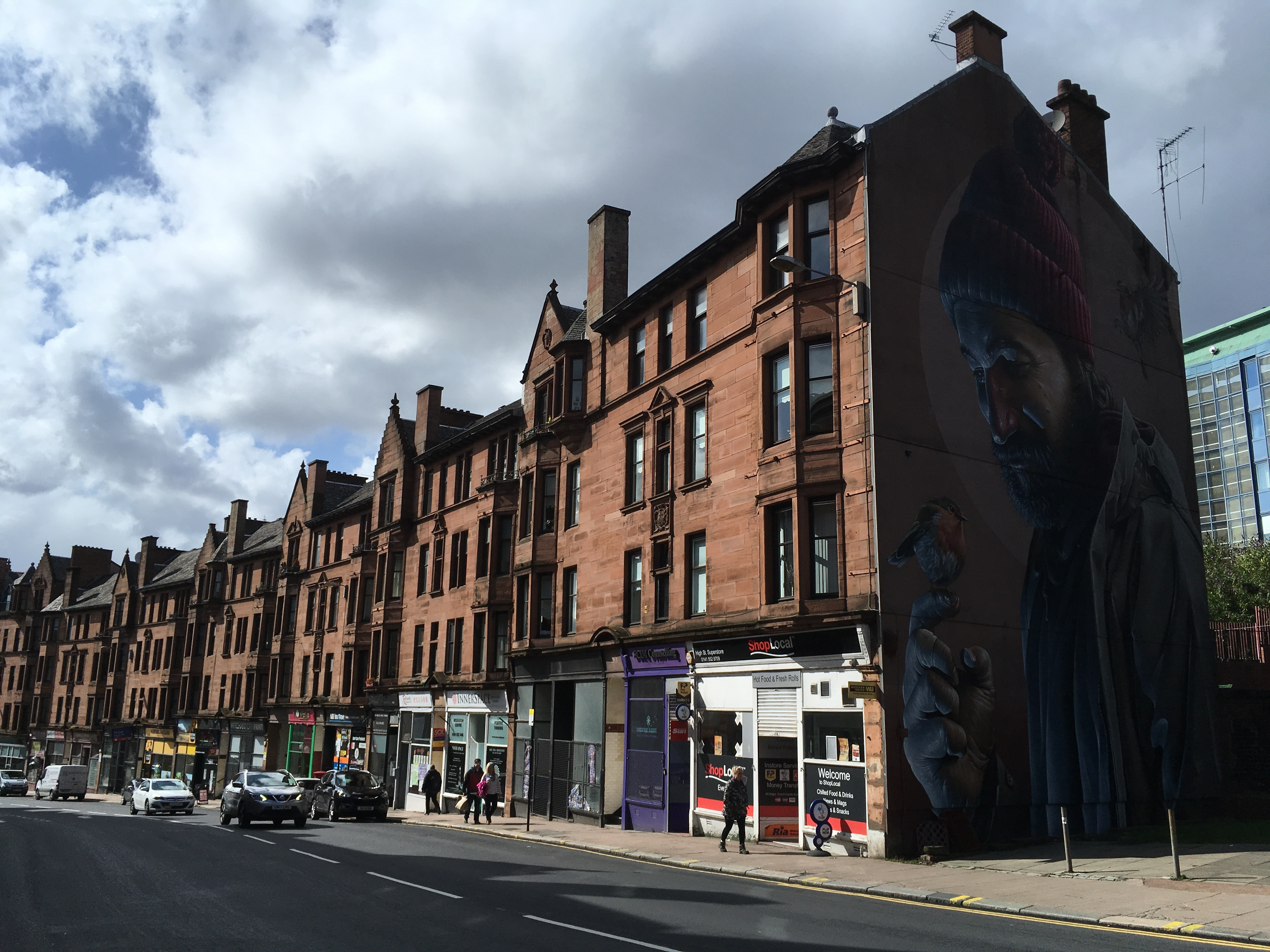
City Improvement Trust tenements, High Street, 1891

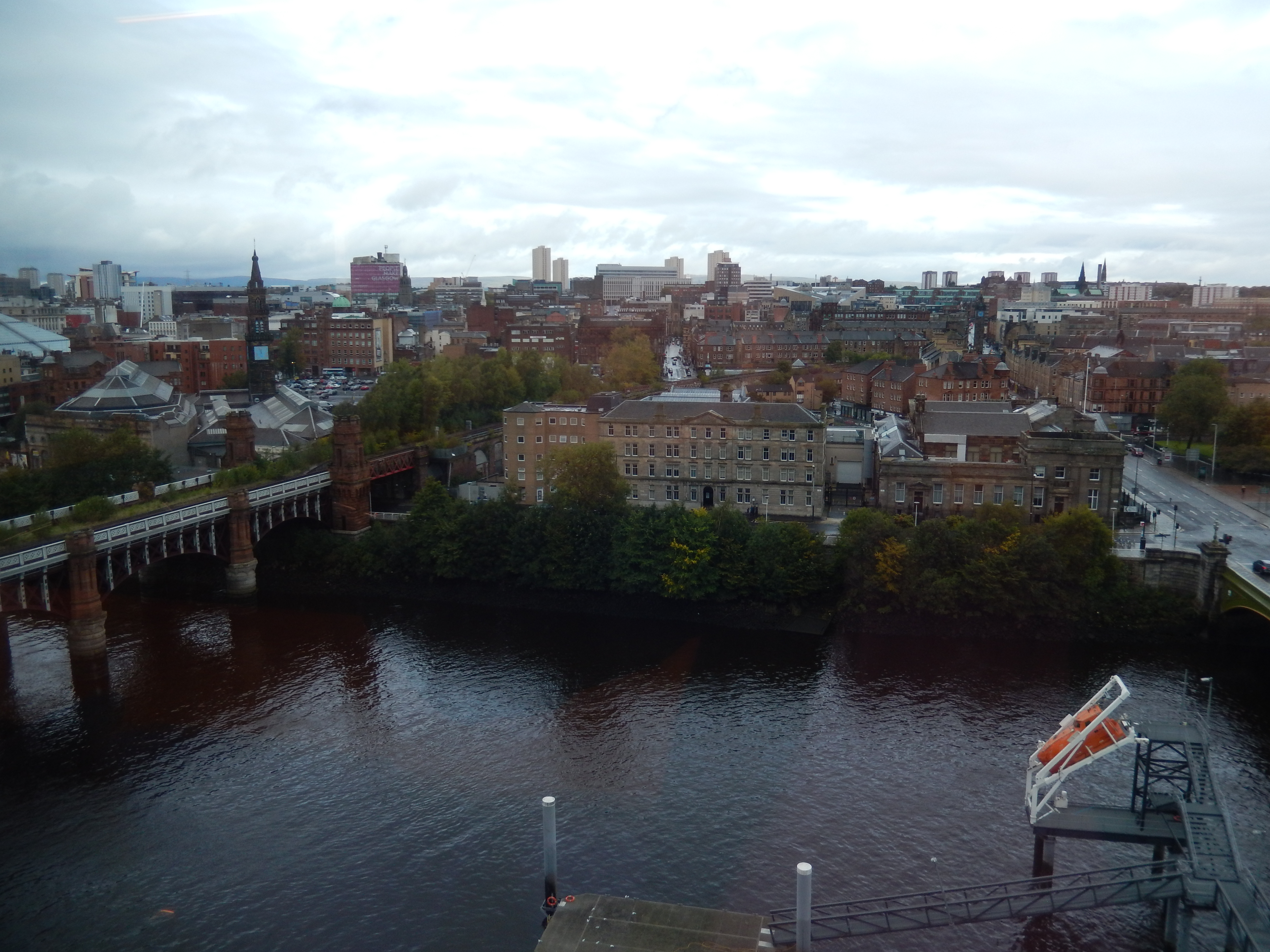
City of Glasgow Police Barracks, Clyde Street, 1891

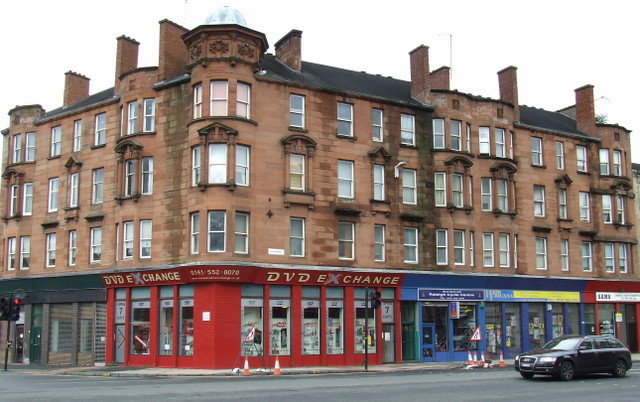
City Improvement Trust tenement with shops, Saltmarket, 1892

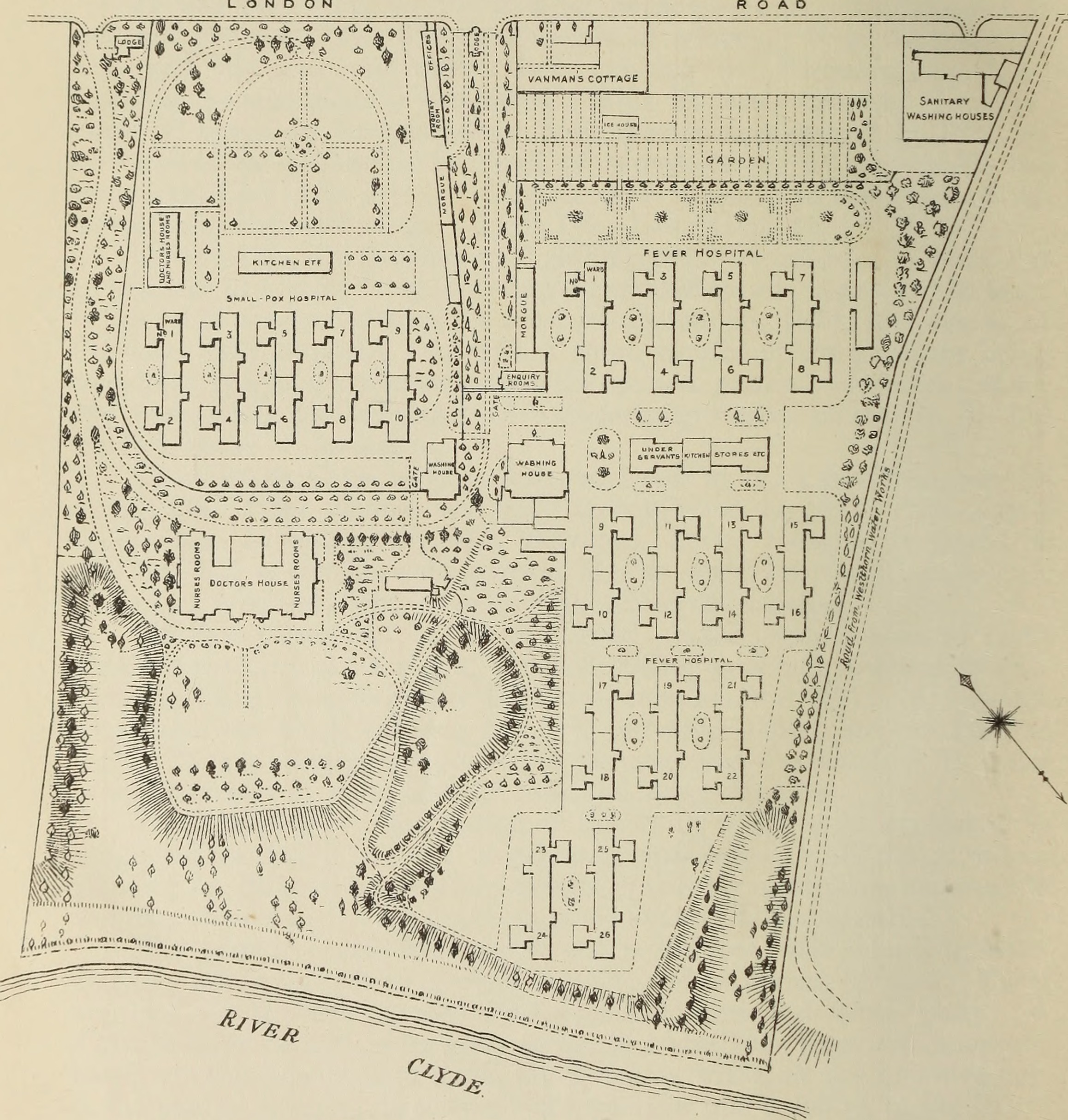
Belvidere Hospital, Parkhead, 1892

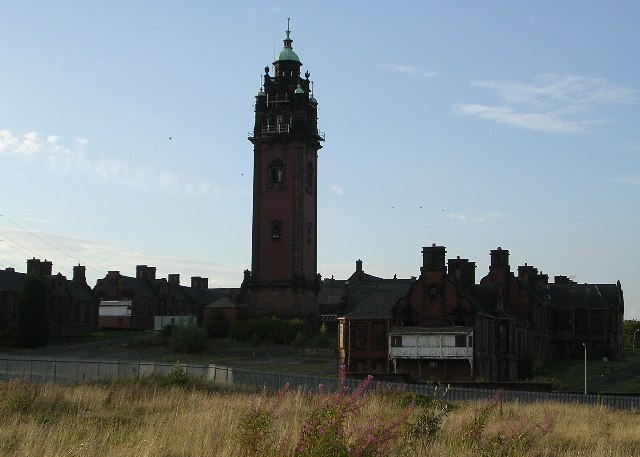
Ruchill Hospital, 1892

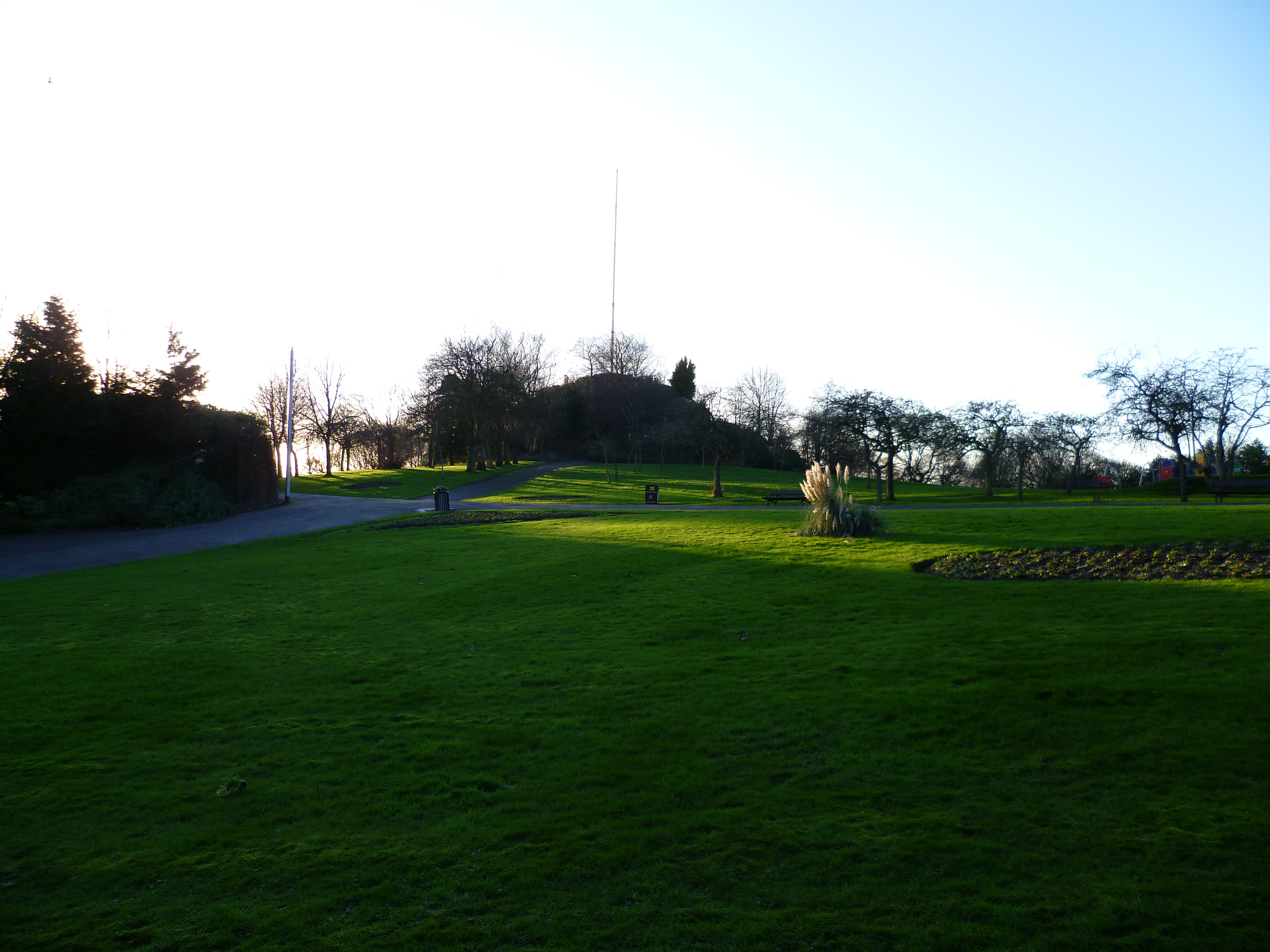
Ruchill Park, 1892

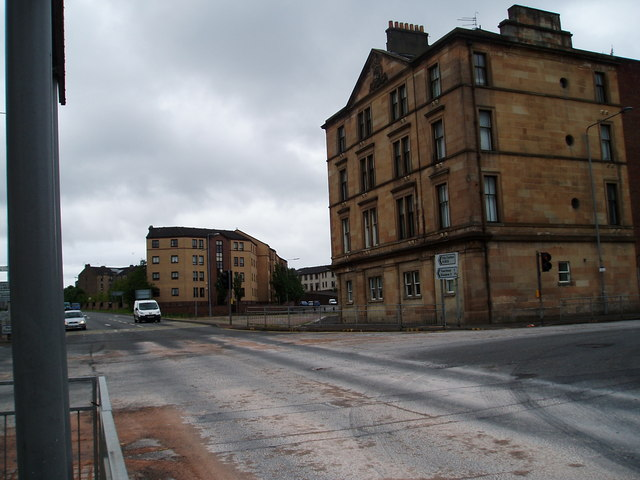
Springburn Fire Station, 1892

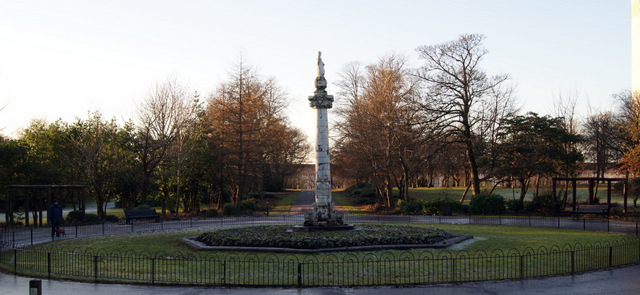
Springburn Park, 1892

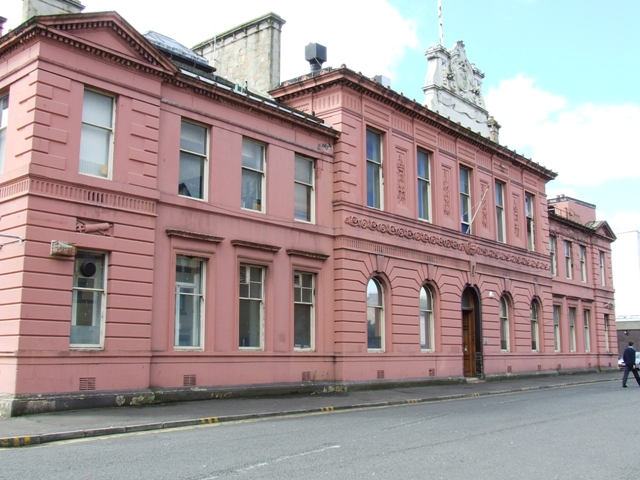
Police Office and Barracks, Nicholson Street, Gorbals, 1892

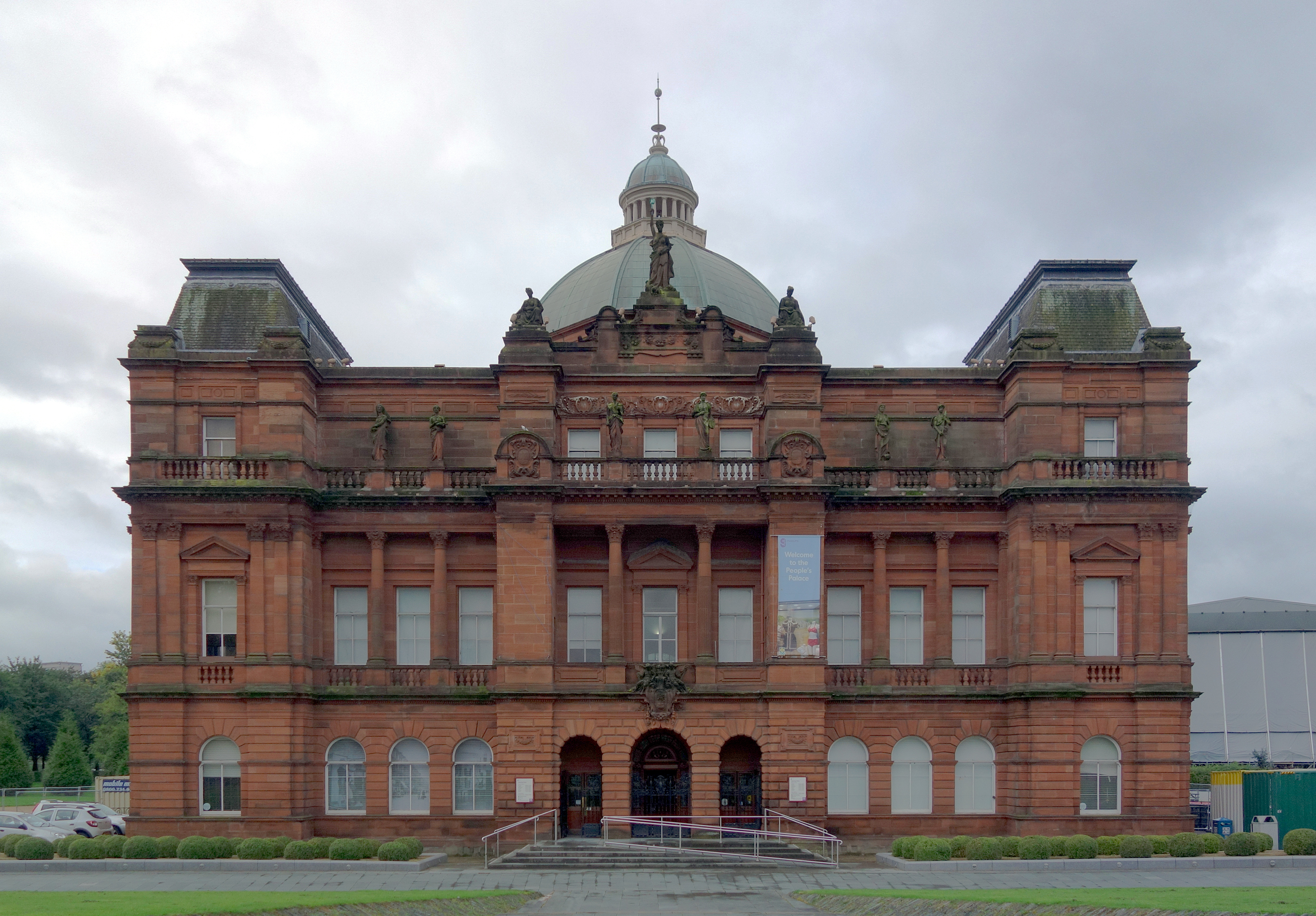
People's Palace, 1893

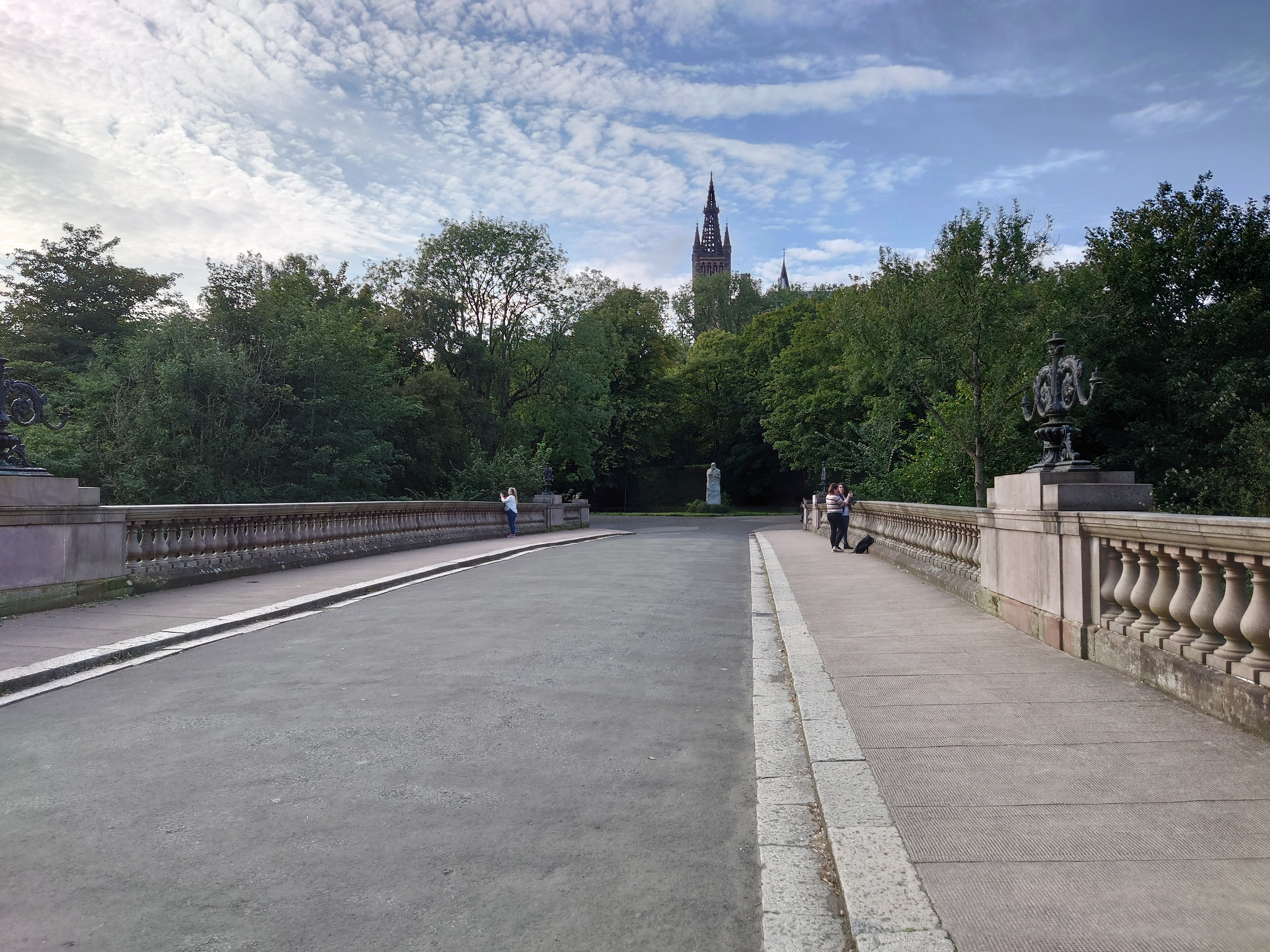
Prince of Wales Bridge, Kelvingrove Park, 1894

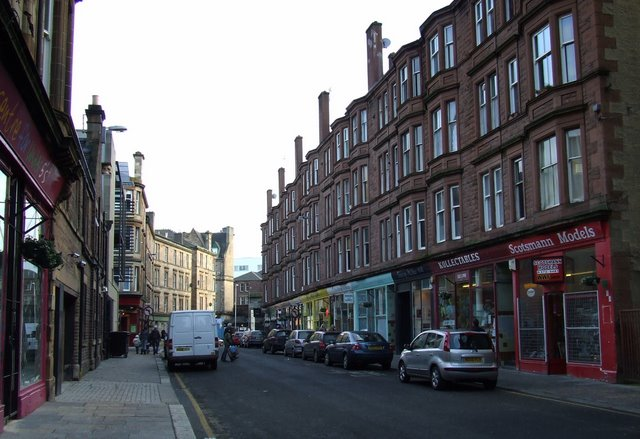
Tenements on King Street, Parnie Street and Osborne Street, 1894

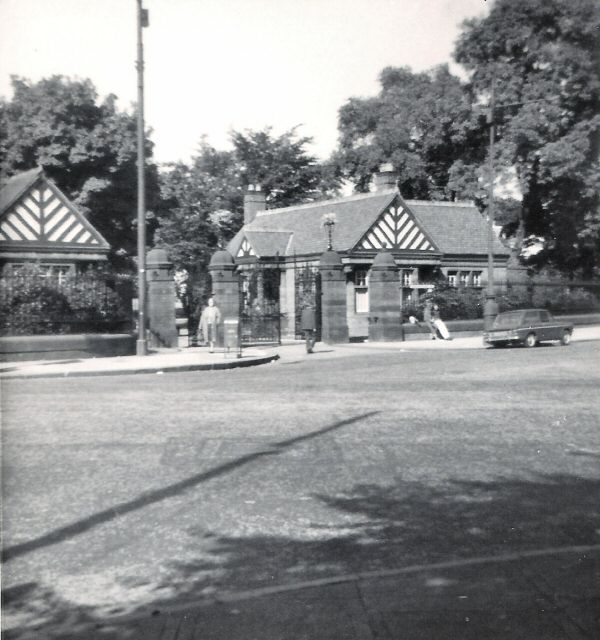
New gates and lodges at Glasgow Botanic Gardens, 1894

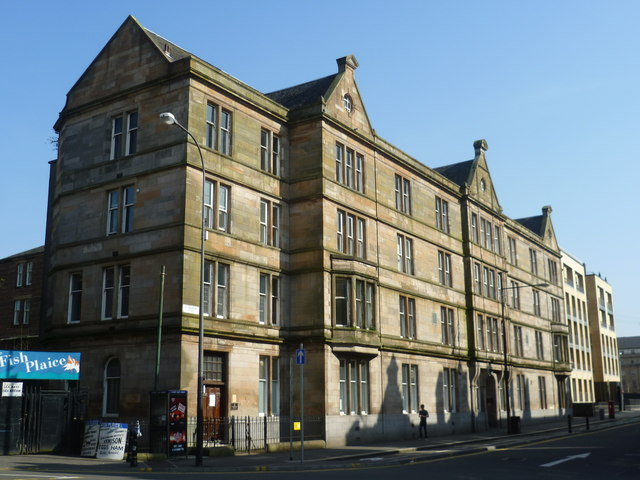
Glasgow District Court, 1894

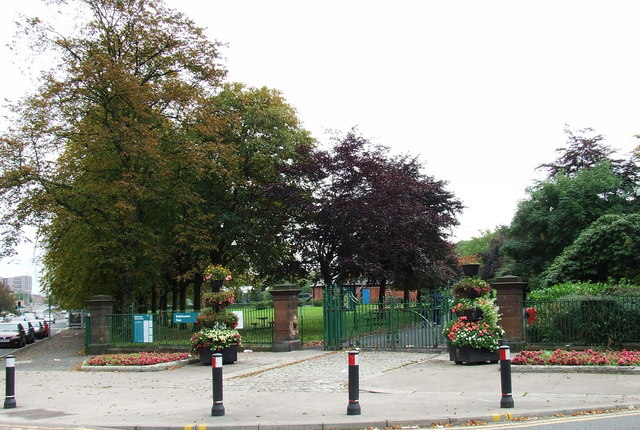
Bellahouston Park, 1896

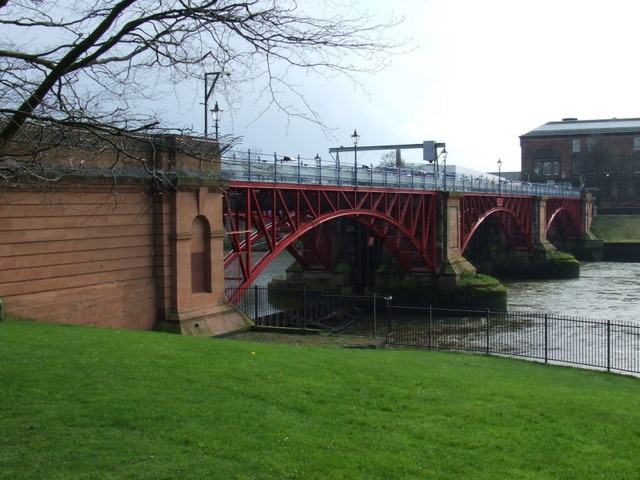
River Clyde Tidal Weir and Pump Bridge, 1896

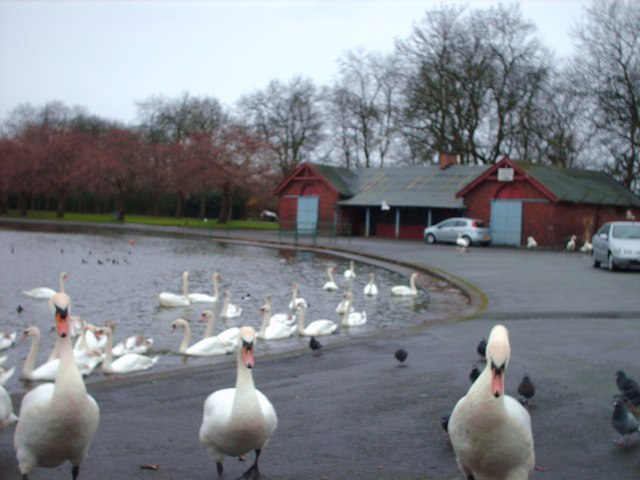
Richmond Park, Oatlands, 1897

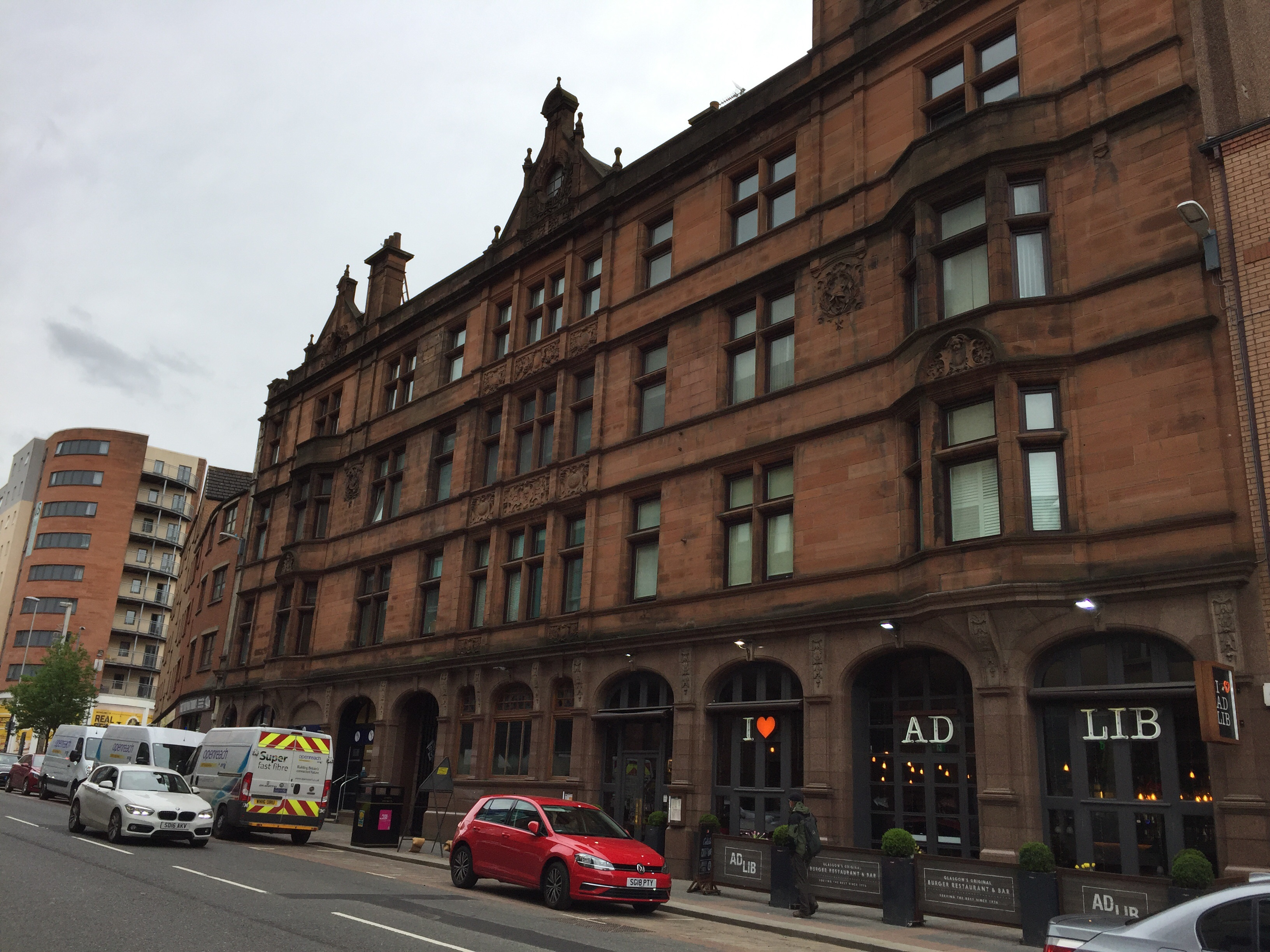
Glasgow Fire Service Headquarters, 1898

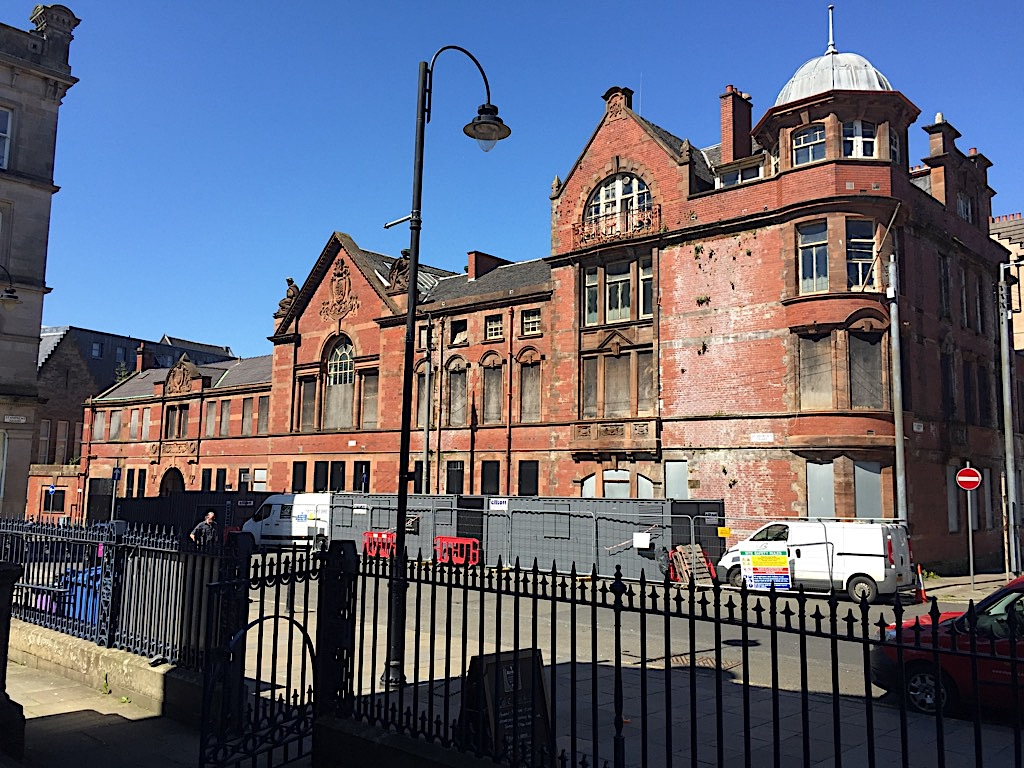
Central Police Building, Turnbull Street, 1903

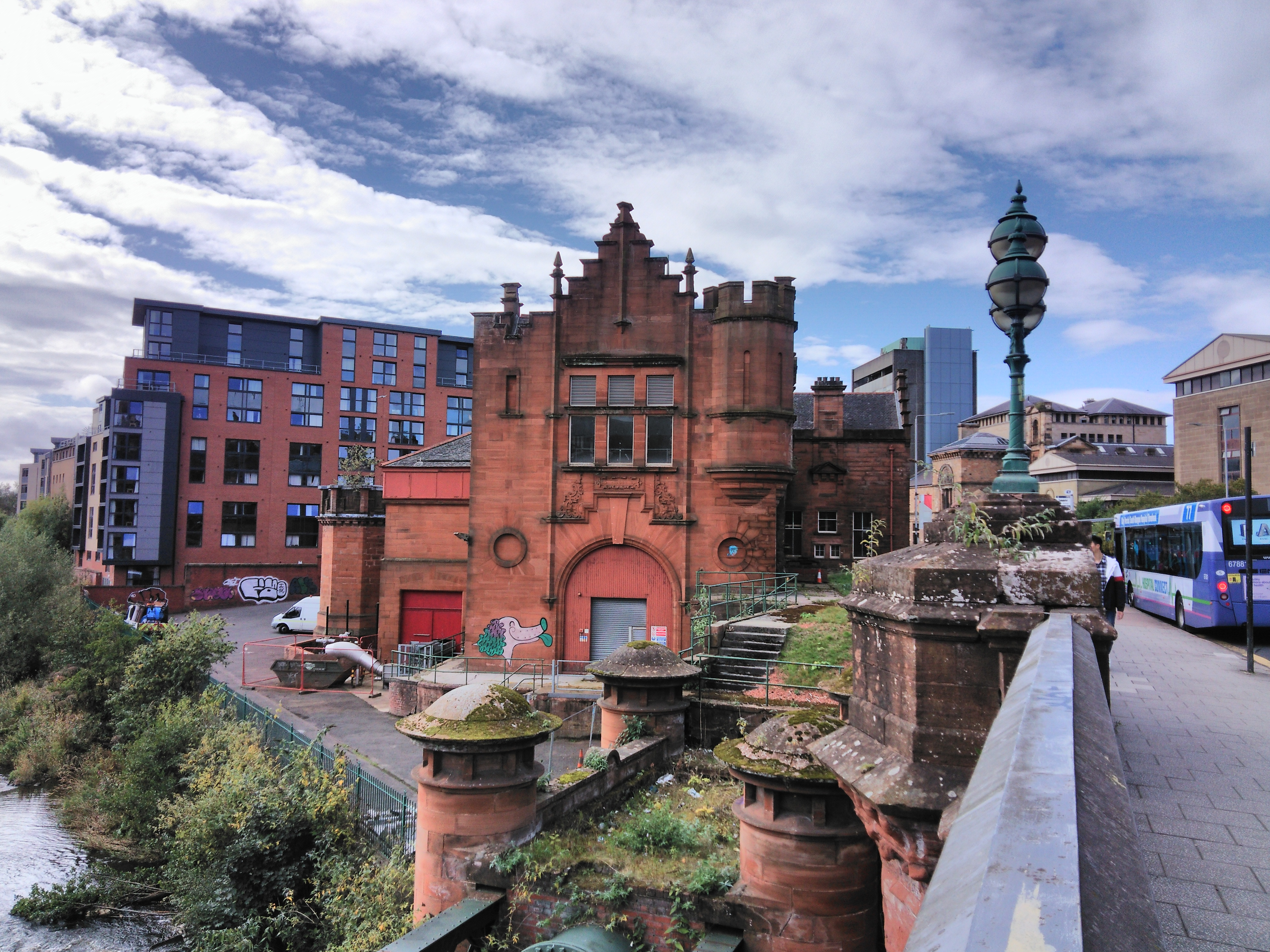
Partick Sewage Pumping Station, 1904

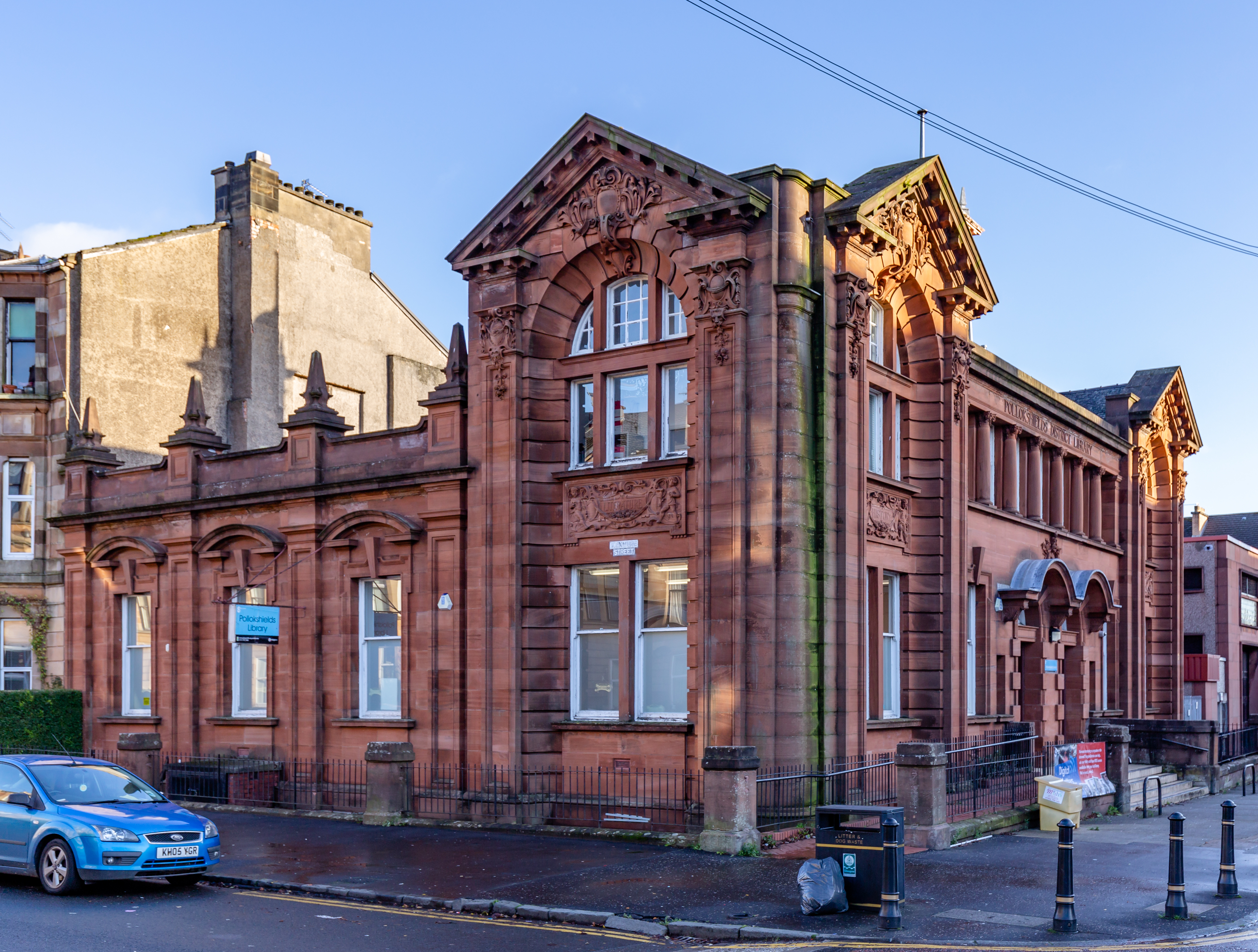
Pollokshields District Library, 1904

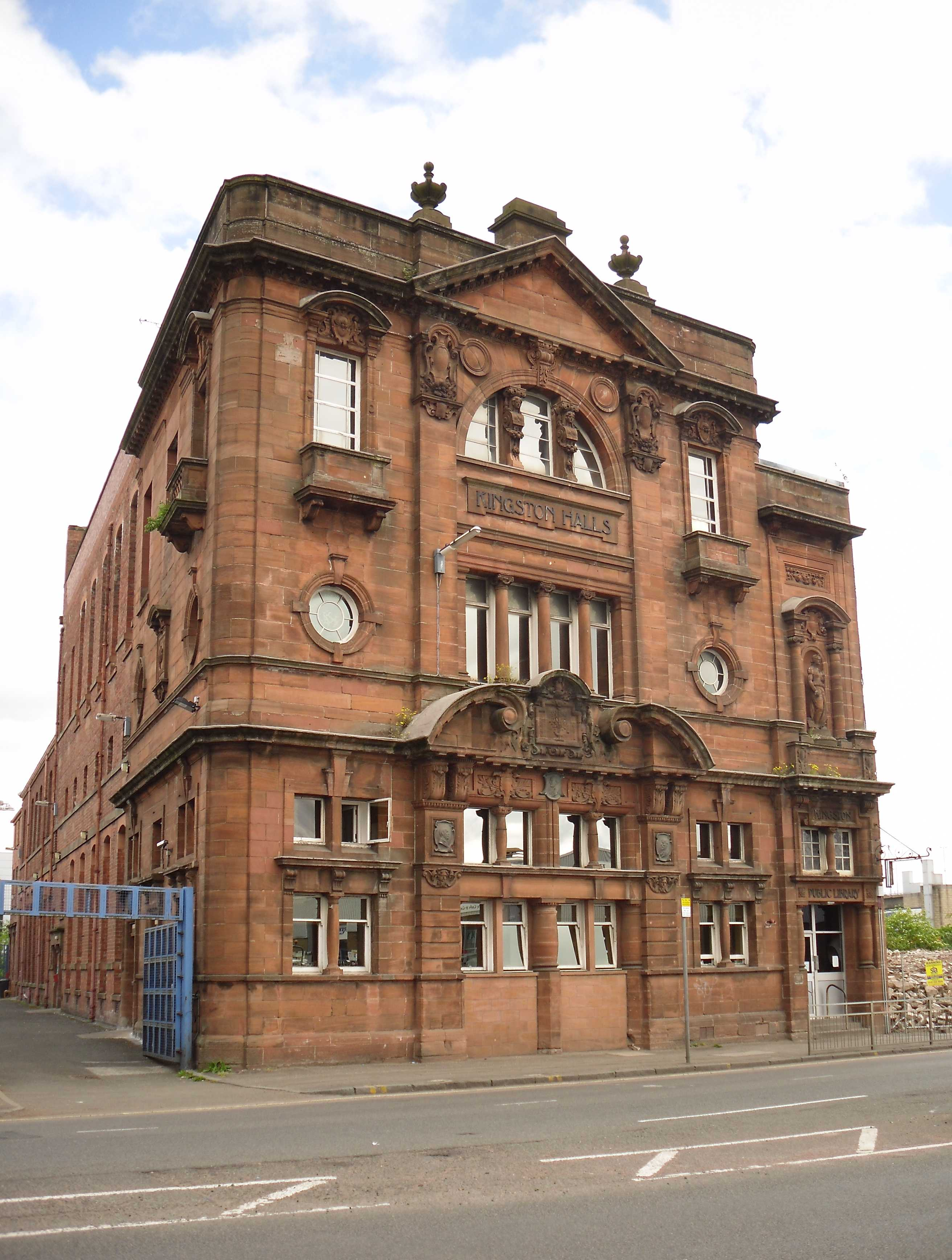
Kingston Public Halls, Library and Police Station

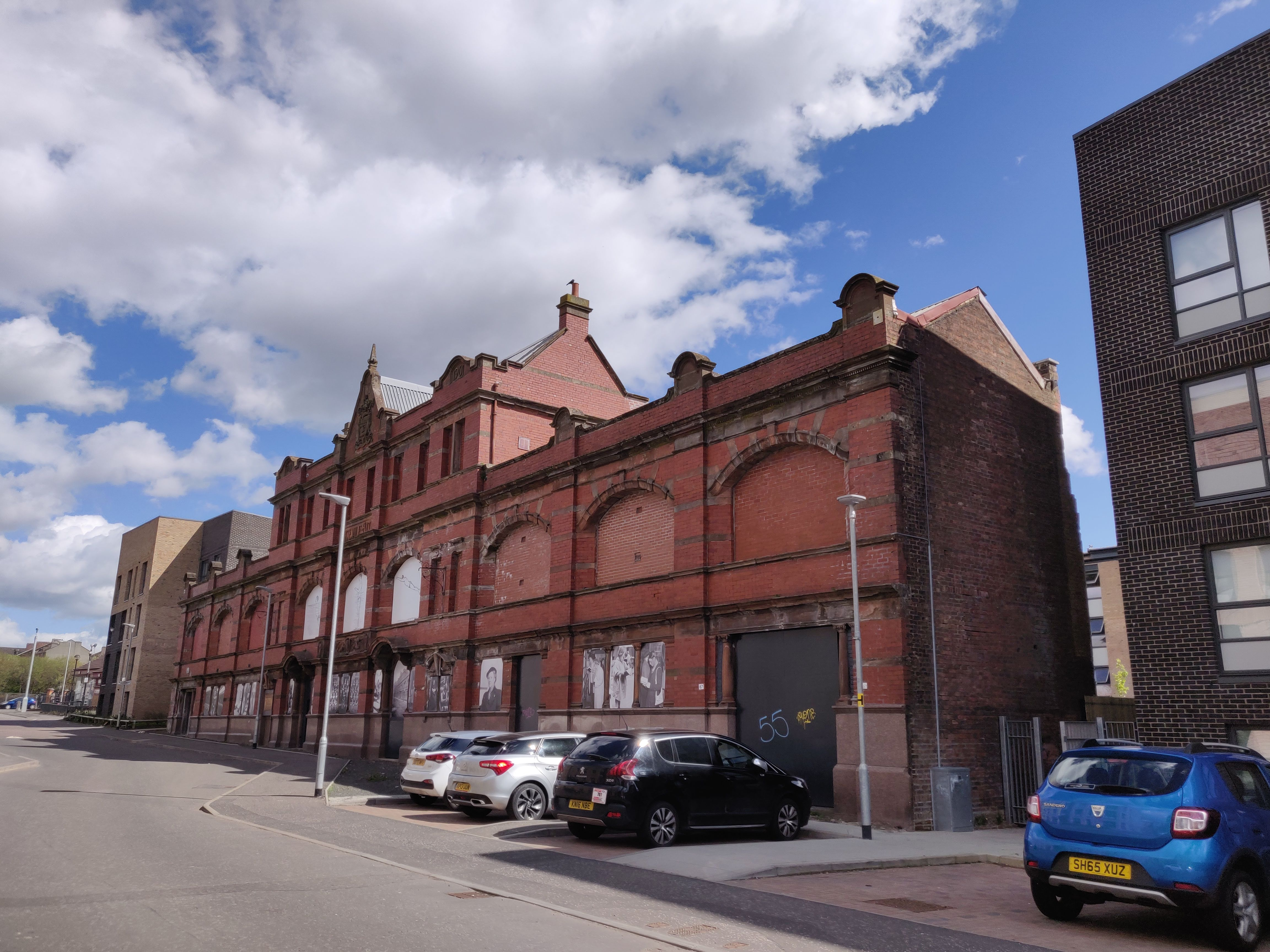
Whitevale Baths, 1905

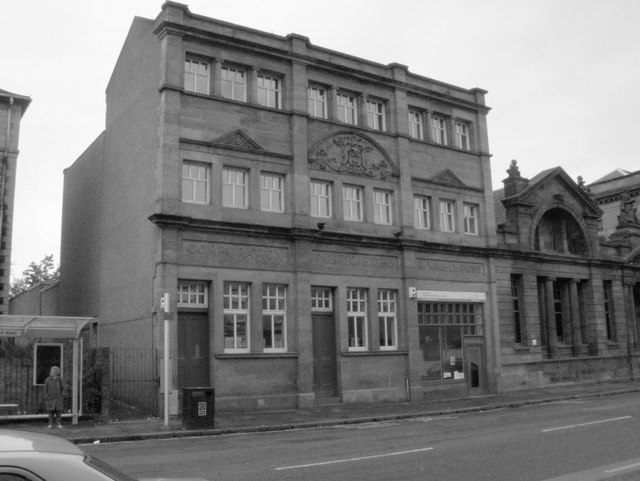
Parkhead Baths and Wash House, 1905

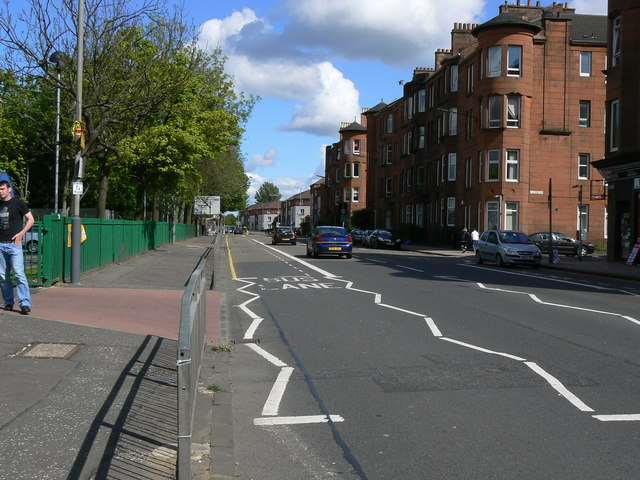
City Improvement Trust tenements, Cumbernauld Road, Haghill, 1905

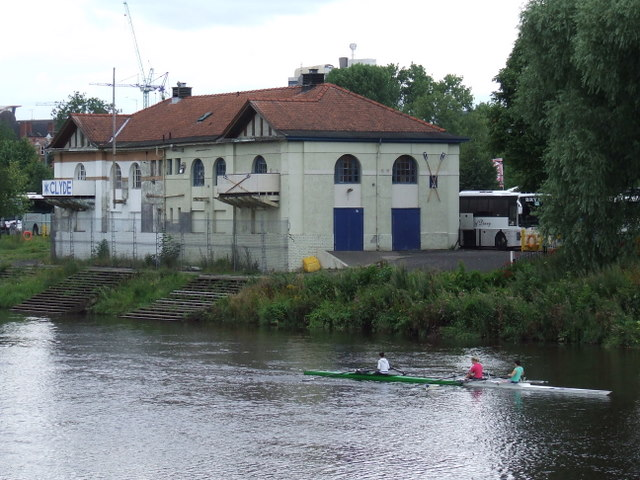
Glasgow Green West Boathouse, 1905

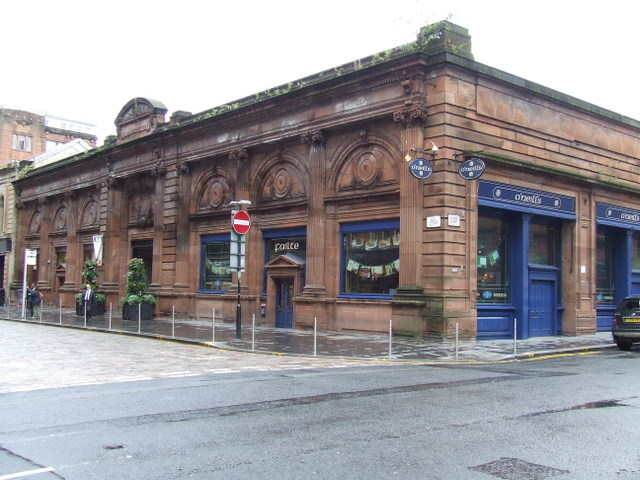
Fruitmarket extension, 1907

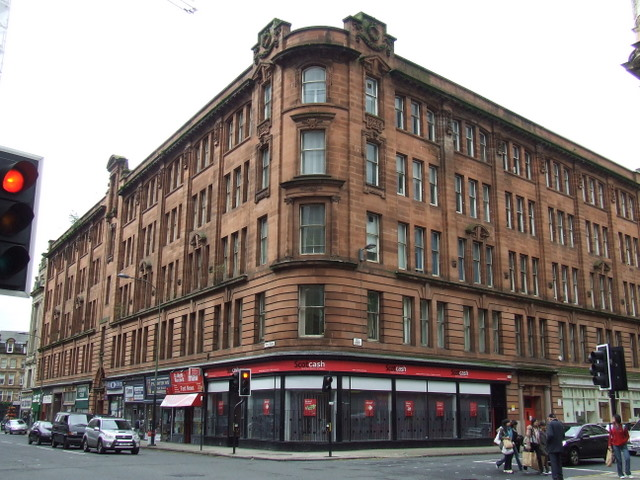
City Improvement Trust block of offices and warehouses, High Street & Bell Street, 1910

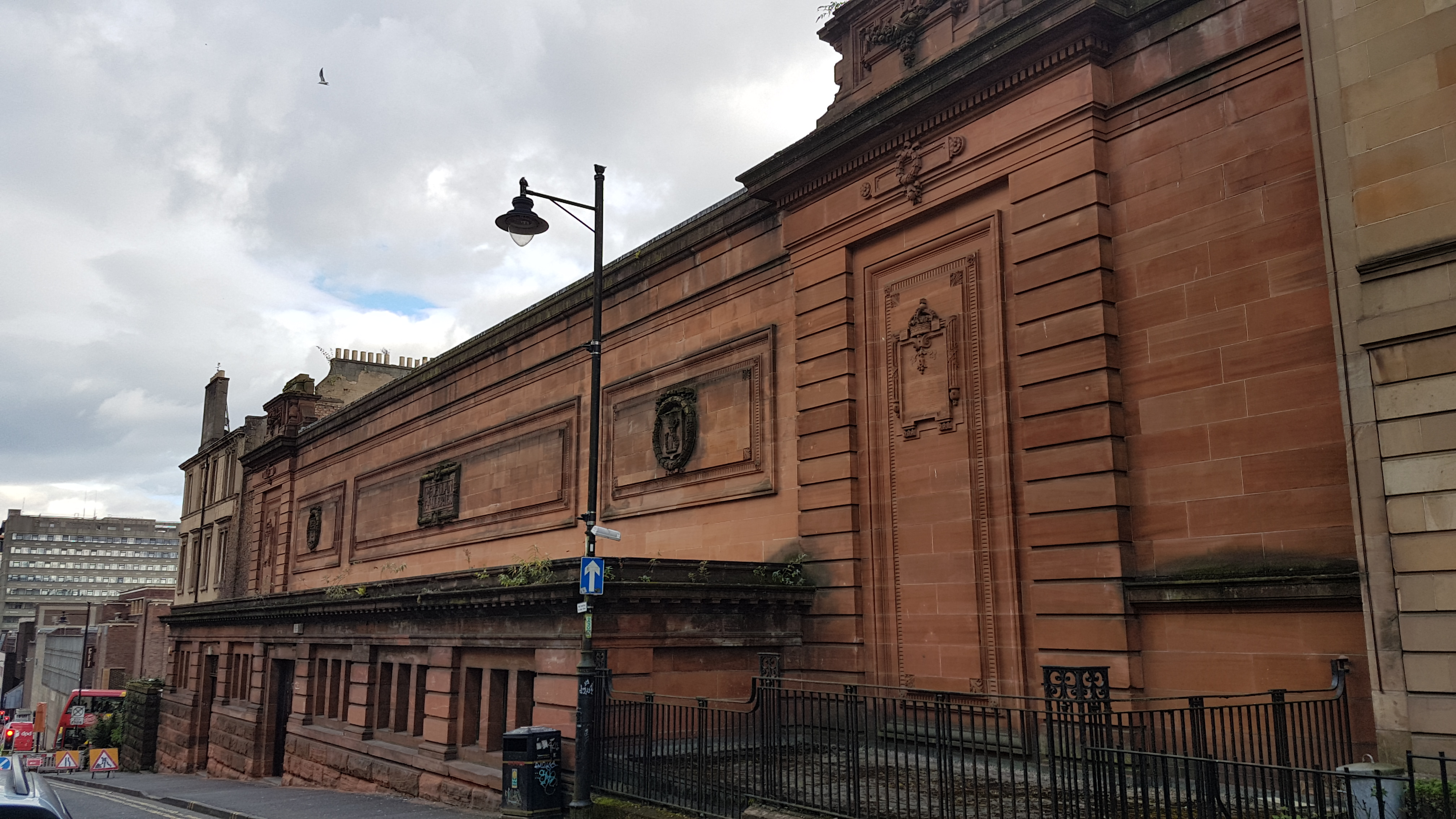
Extension to McLellan Galleries, 1912

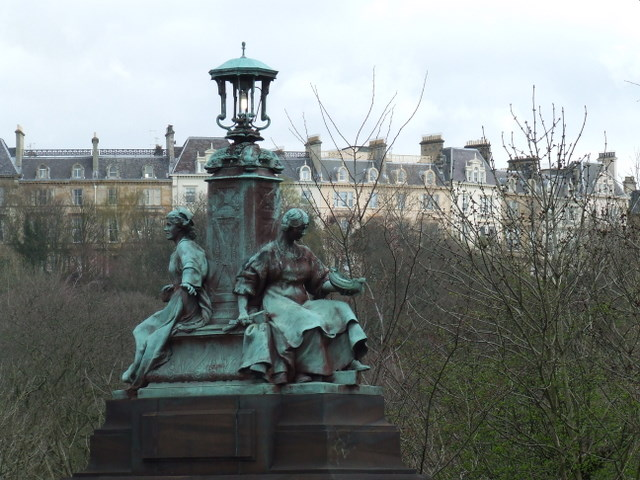
Kelvin Way Bridge, 1912

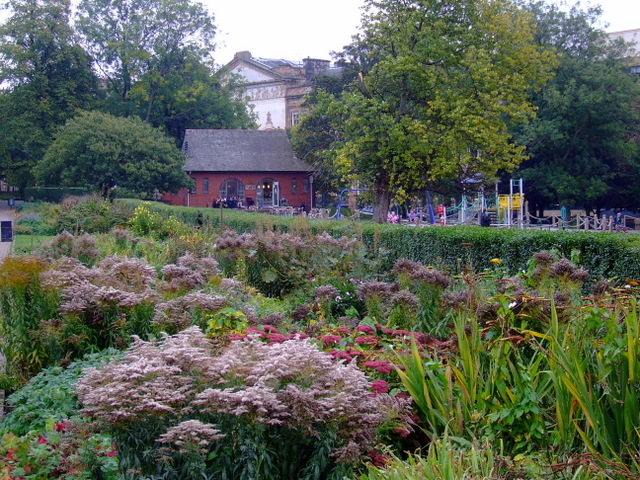
Children's Shelter, Kelvingrove Park, 1913

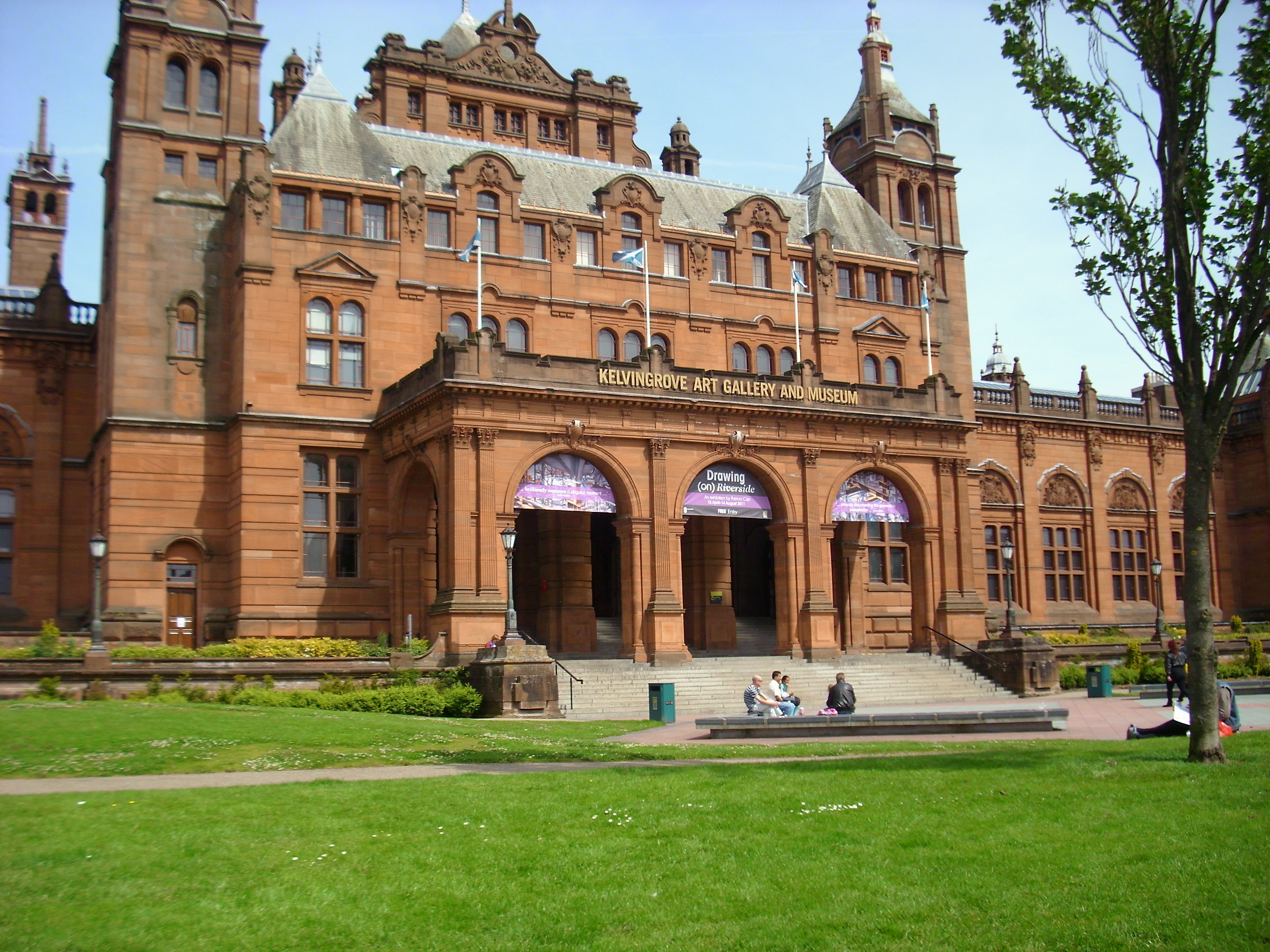
New southern approach and landscaping to Kelvingrove Art Gallery, 1914

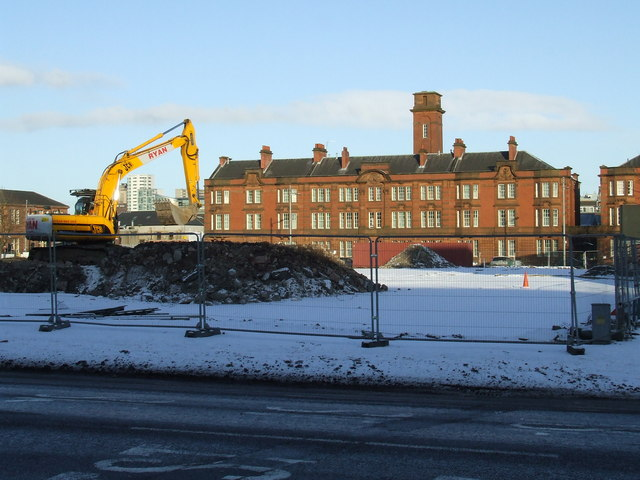
Southern District Fire Station, 1916 (completed after his death in 1915)

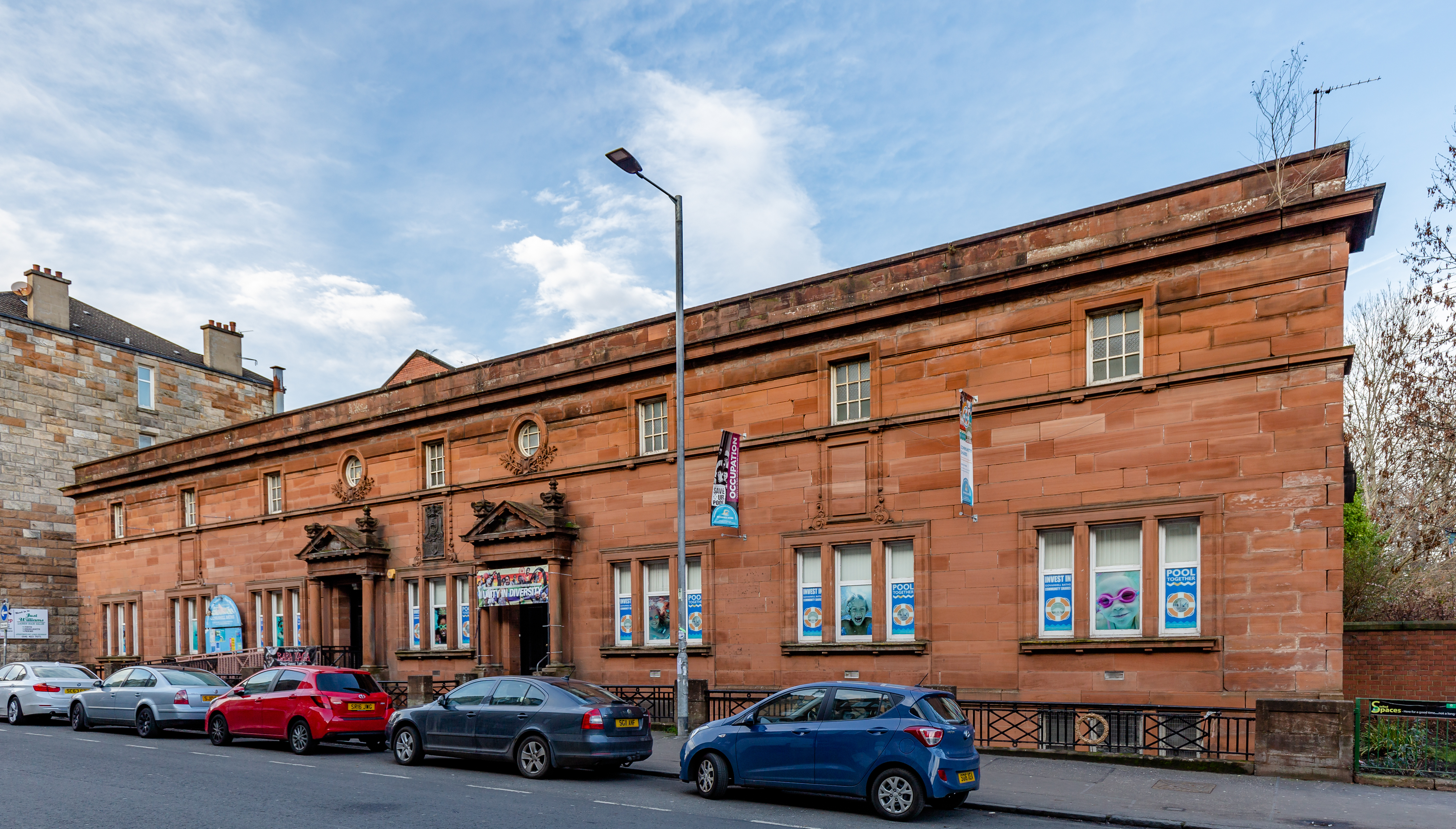
Calder Street Baths and Wash House, Govanhill, 1917 (completed after his death in 1915)
