= David Davidson (footballer, born 1934) =

Scottish footballer (1934-2020)

Personal information
- Full name: David Davidson
- Date of birth: 20 August 1934
- Place of birth: Govanhill, Scotland
- Date of death: January 2020 (aged 85)
- Place of death: Eastwood, Glasgow, Scotland
- Position: Wing half

Senior career*
| Years | Team | Apps | (Gls) |
| 1953–1954 | Manchester City | 1 | (0) |
| 1958–1959 | Workington | 3 | (0) |
- * Club domestic league appearances and goals

David Davidson (20 August 1934 – January 2020) was a Scottish footballer, who played as a wing half in the Football League for Manchester City and Workington. Davidson died in Eastwood, Glasgow in January 2020, mat the age of 85.
