= Govanhill =

Area of Glasgow, Scotland

Coordinates: 55.837610°N 4.261055°W

Govanhill: Scottish Gaelic: Cnoc a' Ghobhainn; Scots: Gouanhull
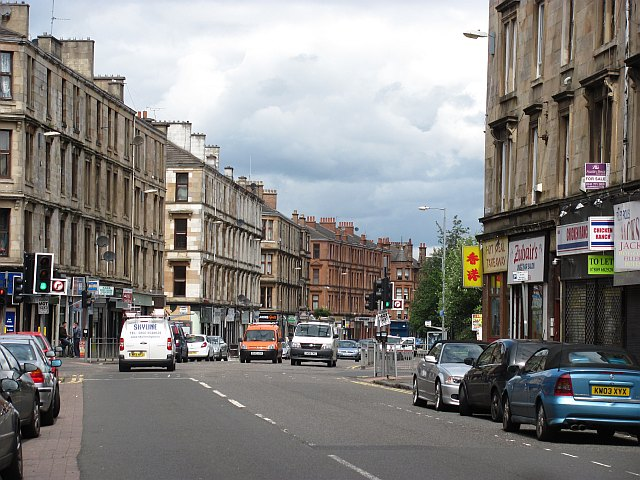
- Cathcart Road

- Location within Glasgow
- Area: 0.86 km^{2} (0.33 sq mi)
- Population: 9,725 (2015)
  - Density: 11,308/km^{2} (29,290/sq mi)
- OS grid reference: NS585628
- Council area: Glasgow
- Lieutenancy area: Glasgow
- Country: Scotland
- Sovereign state: United Kingdom
- Post town: GLASGOW
- Postcode district: G42
- Dialling code: 0141
- Police: Scotland
- Fire: Scottish
- Ambulance: Scottish
- UK Parliament: Glasgow Central
- Scottish Parliament: Glasgow Southside

Govanhill (Scottish Gaelic: Cnoc a' Ghobhainn) is an area of Glasgow, Scotland, situated south of the River Clyde between Pollokshields, the Gorbals, Strathbungo, Crosshill, Polmadie and Queen's Park. Historically part of Renfrewshire, Govanhill had the status of a police burgh between 1877 and 1891 before becoming part of the City of Glasgow. Since 2007, it has fallen under the Southside Central ward of Glasgow City Council. A previous (1999 to 2007) smaller ward named Govanhill had boundaries of Dixon Avenue and Dixon Road to the south, Victoria Road to the west, Butterbiggins Road to the north and Aikenhead Road to the east. In 2026 Govanhill was named as the fifth coolest neighborhood in the world.

== History ==
The history of the area is linked to the Dixon family. A prominent ironmaster, William Dixon, opened blast furnaces to the north of Govanhill which became known as Dixon's Blazes. A company village called Fireworks Village was situated on the site of the later Burgh of Govanhill. The village was built by Dixon for his workers, who worked in his Little Govan Colliery. The area itself was formed in 1877 and the main avenue that runs the length of it is called Dixon Avenue. Some of the local streets were named after the daughters of William Dixon Jnr: Daisy Street, and Annette Street. Allison Street is thought to be named after Sir Archibald Allison, Sheriff Principal of Lanarkshire.

Govanhill gained the status of an independent police burgh in 1877; on achieving this status a police office was set up off Belleisle Street. Cells for prisoners, tenements for constables, and stables were added. Govanhill shared a burgh hall with its neighbour, Crosshill; this building is now known as Dixon Halls. Both burghs were absorbed by the expanding city of Glasgow in 1891. As the construction expanded to the west of Victoria Road during that period, Govanhill became joined with its older neighbour Strathbungo. A secondary school, fire station and police station were constructed in that sector to serve the growing population, integrated into the same sandstone tenement style as surrounding dwellings. The buildings have been converted and still stand today - the school is now for younger age groups as St Brides Primary, the others are apartments; The nearest fire station is still fairly close at Polmadie, a short distance to the north of the modern police office at Aikenhead Road.

== Architecture ==
=== Escaping the wrecking ball ===
Govanhill was one of the few areas to avoid Glasgow Corporation's program of 'Comprehensive Development Areas' in the 1960s. This program saw older tenement housing in 29 inner-city neighbourhoods (including nearby Pollokshaws and the Gorbals) demolished and replaced with new non-traditional buildings, typically high rise or deck-access apartments of a lower density, with large proportions of the existing communities dispersed to new estates at the edge of Glasgow such as Pollok and Castlemilk, or to Scotland's new towns – e.g. East Kilbride and Cumbernauld.

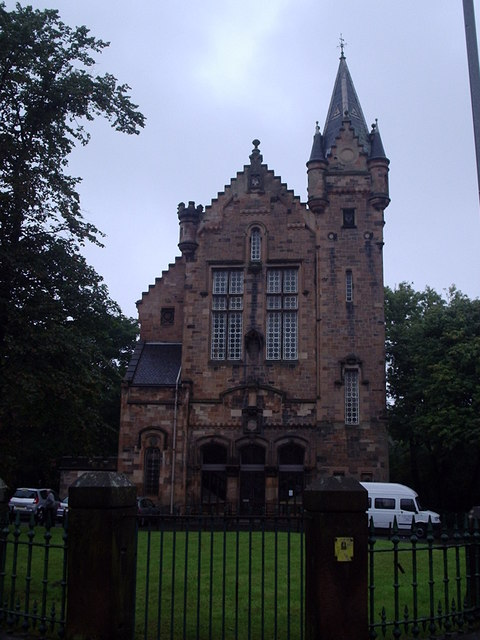
Dixon Halls, formerly Crosshill and Govanhill Burgh Hall (1879–1891). The boundary of the burghs ran through the building, with separate entrances for each

Govanhill resisted this redevelopment programme and, based on early experience in Govan, a community based Housing Association was established in 1974, run by the residents living in the area. Instead of mass demolition, a steady process of improving the quality of the flats and installing modern amenities was undertaken. This was complemented by sensitive new building in gap sites. The community action at that time allowed Govanhill to retain their period housing stock and public buildings, the majority of which was built between 1890 and 1912, including examples from famous Scottish architects such as Alexander "Greek" Thomson and James Robert Rhind.

=== 21st century ===
The refurbishment of Govanhill's tenement housing was not completed due to changes in policy and funding in the early 2000s. By that time, 13 housing blocks in the south-west of the district remained 'unimproved'. It is in this area that the most significant housing problems in Govanhill appeared – poor-quality housing stock, over 2,000 private landlords, low levels of owner occupation, low levels of factoring/property management and overcrowding. In combination with housing issues, the district has been known at times as a place where levels of recorded crime and violence are higher than the national average, owing to its history as a destination for migrants of low means and high population density.

Under Section 28 of the Housing (Scotland) Act 2014 and in order to tackle problems in the private rented sector, four tenement blocks within South West Govanhill were designated an Enhanced Enforcement Area (EEA) in September 2015. In 2017, this was expanded to include a further 14 blocks. As a result, some of the housing in the area has been improved, with Glasgow City Council seizing property that failed to achieve the required standard and removing rogue landlords (many of whom had allowed their properties to be occupied by dangerously high numbers of poor, newly arrived immigrants with few other housing options, the flats often lacking basic utilities such as running water) from the Scottish Landlord Register. This ongoing program is scheduled to be continue for several years until the properties in the sector are brought up to required modern standards and occupied in a responsible manner.

=== Buildings of note ===
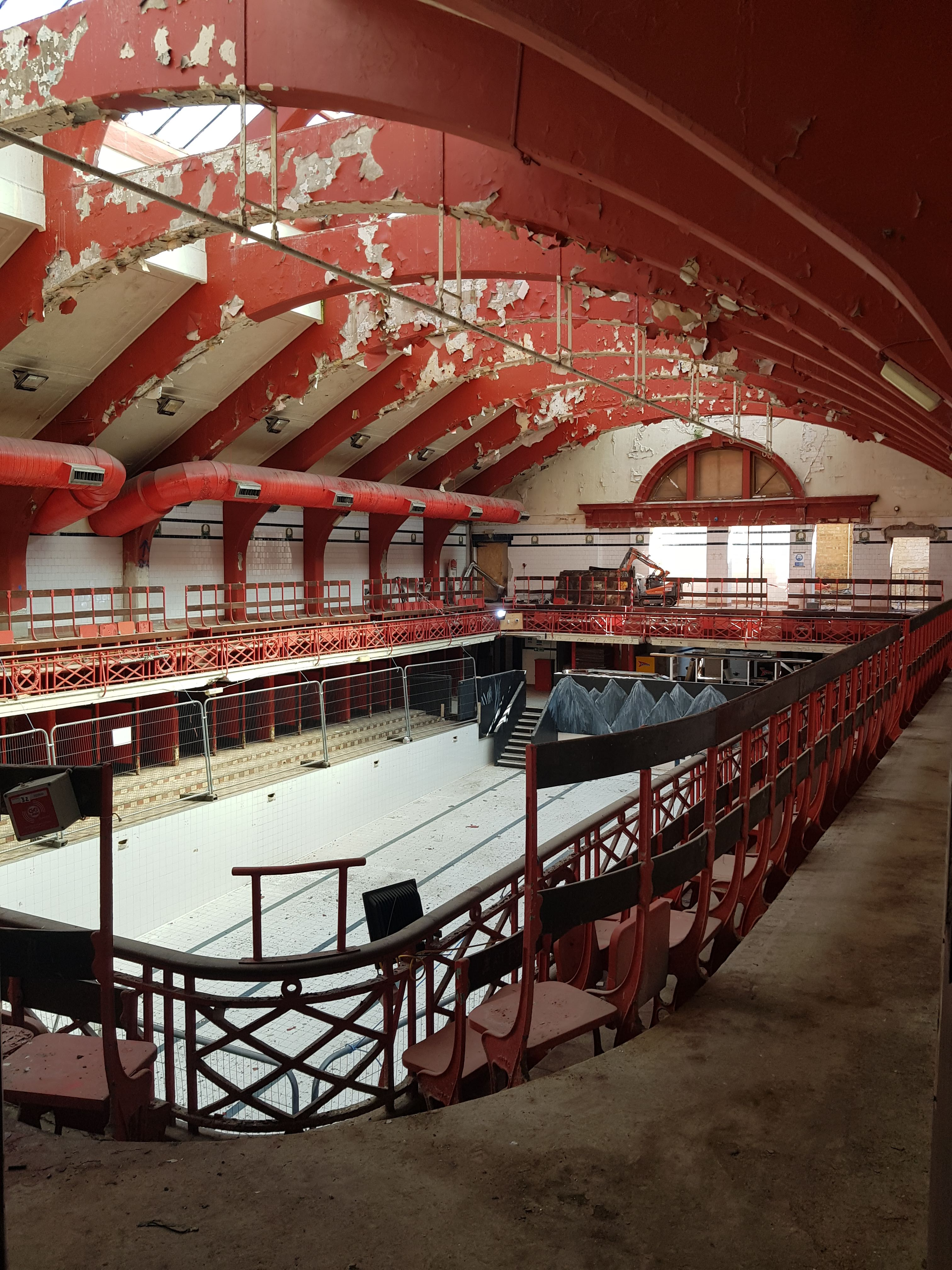
Interior of Govanhill Baths, showing concrete roof construction

Govanhill is home to one of Glasgow's original Carnegie libraries, designed in the Edwardian Baroque style by James Robert Rhind.

The area has a number of residential buildings by architect Alexander "Greek" Thomson (known for notable Glasgow buildings including The Egyptian Halls and Holmwood House), such as 19-23 Garturk Street, 265-289 Allison Street and 34 Daisy Street all of which remain private residences.

Govanhill Picture House is an Egyptian-themed cinema built in 1926, designed by architect Eric A. Sutherland. The building is currently considered 'at risk', and as of 2019, local community group Glasgow Artists' Moving Image Studios (GAMIS) has been working to bring the cinema into use for the local vibrant art scene.

Govanhill Baths, which currently provide a home for communities groups, and health and wellbeing programmes - from swimming classes to art and ceramics groups - was designed by A. B. McDonald and opened in 1917 after the architect's death. It closed as a swimming venue in 2001, but moves to demolish the building were resisted by community groups.

== Community ==
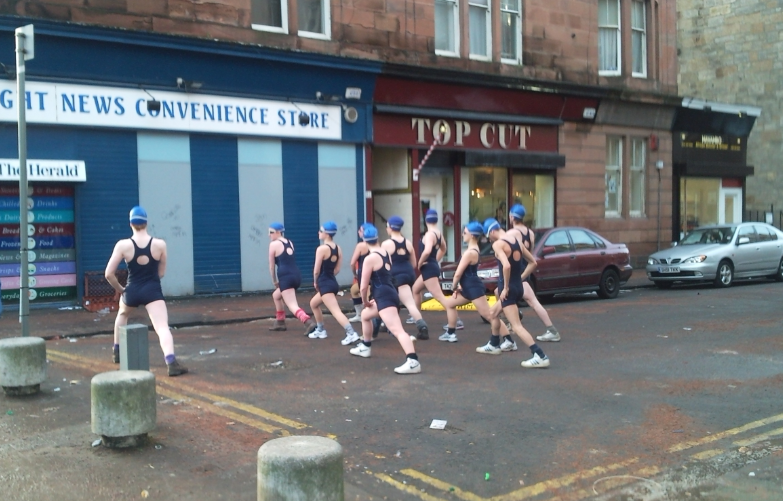
Activists at Victoria Road, Govanhill

=== Immigration and diversity ===
From the first days of the neighbourhood's formation, Govanhill has always been a popular settlement area for people coming to Glasgow and Scotland. The population has regularly changed and diversified as migrants have chosen to live in the area. Migration started with people from the Highlands and Lowlands of Scotland; from England (workers from Shropshire to carry new techniques at the iron works); from Ireland (particularly County Donegal); Italians; Jews fleeing persecution in Eastern Europe; people from the Punjab and other parts of the Indian sub-continent; Glasgow's new communities of former asylum seekers and refugees and – most recently – migrants benefiting from Enlargement of the European Union originating from Poland, Slovakia, the Czech Republic (2004) and Romania and Bulgaria (2007). The area has long been Scotland's most culturally diverse neighbourhood. Of the 15,000 people living in the neighbourhood, approximately 33% are from ethnic minority communities (2012), with Roma people from Eastern Europe making up 3,000–3,500 of the local population. This diversity is reflected in the local shops, the languages spoken in the street and in the people found locally. A social survey carried out by Govanhill Housing Association identified 52 nationalities and 32 languages spoken within just 13 tenement blocks within the area.

==== Racism ====
Concerns over issues such as violent sexual crime, child exploitation and human trafficking became more prevalent since increased migration of the Roma community into Govanhill from Eastern Europe, with numerous reports of women and children being prostituted and arrests made by the police in the area for related offences on multiple occasions. However, when specialist officers from Police Scotland's National Child Abuse Investigation Unit investigated these reports in 2018, they were proved to either be unsupported by evidence, to be exaggerated or not to involve the local Roma community.

During the COVID-19 pandemic in Scotland in 2020, false reports of Govanhill's Roma community flouting lockdown rules led to a reported 50% of the Roma population fleeing the area in fear of being targeted by racist violence. At the end of that year, social media videos alleging widespread and ongoing child abuse by the Roma community in Govanhill which were viewed by thousands prompted denials from the police, local groups and Nicola Sturgeon. Footage of squalor and accumulation of dangerous waste in back courts and common closes, itself by no means a new problem in the area, was more readily identifiable in the videos, though it was apparent that this was exacerbated to an extent by the pandemic which had disrupted regular and by-request refuse collection services, and indeed in that same week community groups staged a protest at the rubbish problem by collecting black bags and leaving them at the front gates of Queen's Park.

==== LGBTQ+ community ====
The neighbourhood is considered to be queer and queer-friendly, and is home to several queer businesses and organizations such as Category Is Books and Small Trans Library.

=== Deprivation ===
Owing to housing density, increases in population through migration, overcrowding and high levels of occupancy, the south west of Govanhill is one of the most densely populated areas in Scotland. This places strain on local infrastructure and adds to community tensions, environmental problems and other social issues. Despite this focus on the south west of the district the highest levels of multiple deprivations exist within North Govanhill, particularly in the predominantly social housing area to the east of Cathcart Road. As of December 2020 the Scottish Index of Multiple Deprivation (SIMD) and other sources indicates that:

- 7 of the 12 data zones making up Govanhill are within the bottom 15% of data zones in Scotland. One of these data zones occupies the bottom 5% of data zones in Scotland;
- 20% of the population do not have any qualifications compared to 13% across the whole of Scotland;
- 1176 (17%) of the population is (officially) unemployed
- Since 2013, Govanhill has seen an extraordinary drop in crimes. Total crime figures for the year ending 2019 were 762, a drop of 75% since 2013-2014 (3165 total crimes).

Govanhill has long been recognized as one of Scotland's deprived communities and this continues to be borne out in SIMD 2020. All but 1 of the area's 12 data-zones fall into the bottom 30% of all Scottish data-zones. Of these 11 data-zones, 7 fall into the bottom 15% of Scottish data-zones, with 6 datazones in the bottom 10%. This indicates particularly acute deprivation in much of the neighbourhood. Govanhill's most deprived data-zones are typically found in the Govanhill East and Aikenhead part of the district. Three of the five lowest ranked data-zones in Govanhill can be found in this area.

In addition to the above, all but four of Govanhill's SIMD data-zones occupy the bottom 15% of data-zones in Scotland in terms of income.

== Attractions ==
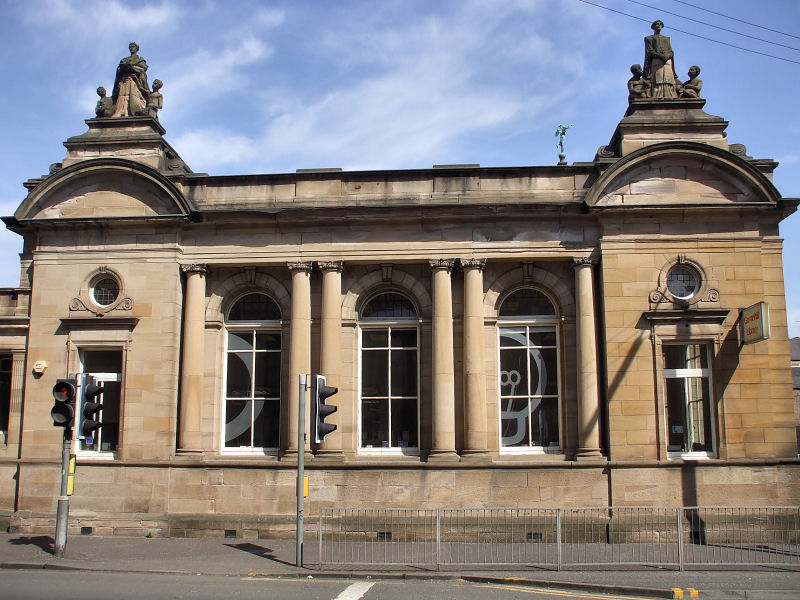
Calder Street frontage of Govanhill Library

Govanhill is home to a thriving creative arts community, including Dance Factory Dance Studios in Calder Street and a variety of arts activities taking place in Govanhill Baths. The Chalet in Dixon Avenue and Southside Studios in Westmoreland Street are both home to successful visual artists and other creatives. Since 2009, the area has had its own arts festival - Streetland, which usually takes place in early summer in streets and venues across the area. Govanhill Housing Association also organizes an annual Fun Day for local residents.

Multiple organizations are also active inside the local community and provide opportunities for voluntary work. Areas of focus include environmental conservation, arts development, addiction prevention, youth and elderly engagement as well as educational programs. In particular, the local neighborhood center provides a considerable amount of recreational activities and for the general public. .

Govanhill is also famous for its shops, which in themselves reflect the huge diversity of the area. There are a number of businesses supporting international connections – money transfer businesses, cargo services, travel agencies – as well as clothing and food stores for all nationalities. The area is also home to a number of traditional shops – cobblers, school uniform suppliers, cafes etc. Planning approval was granted for a mixed leisure and retail development at the demolished Larkfield bus depot near Eglinton Toll (latterly occupied by First Glasgow), but this eventually became one of several residential projects in the north of the district constructed in the late 2010s. A retail park did open nearby in the same period at Crown Street on the southern edge of the neighbouring Gorbals district, adjacent to the replacement First Bus headquarters on Caledonia Road – filling much of the expanse of derelict land which had created something of a physical 'buffer' between the two inner-city areas for several decades. The local Church of Scotland parish, Govanhill Trinity Church on Daisy Street, closed in 2015 after the congregation united with Queen's Park Church in Queen's Drive, becoming Queen's Park Govanhill Parish Church.

=== Govanhill International Festival and Carnival ===
Govanhill International Festival and Carnival is a yearly event that began in 2017. It is a cultural program featuring live music and historical, culinary, and educational events culminating in a carnival parade. The festival is organised by Govanhill Baths Community Trust.

== Elected representatives ==
- Member of Parliament: John Grady (Glasgow East)
- Member of Scottish Parliament: Holly Bruce (Glasgow Southside)
- Members of Scottish Parliament (Glasgow region list): Iris Duane, Patrick Harvie, Thomas Kerr, Monica Lennon, Pauline McNeill, Kim Schmulian, Paul Sweeney
- Glasgow City Council Ward 8 - Southside Central: Councillor Alexander Belic, Baillie Elaine Gallagher, Councillor Mhairi Hunter, Baillie Soryia Siddique

== Notable people from Govanhill ==
=== Industry ===
- Charles Frank (1865–1959), optical and scientific instrument maker, emigrated from Lithuania to Govanhill by 1910
- Sir Monty Finniston (1912–1991), industrialist

=== Politics ===
- Bashir Ahmad (1940–2009), first BAME person to be elected to the Scottish Parliament, emigrated from Pakistan to Govanhill in 1961
- Rosie Kane (1961–), politician

=== The Arts ===
- C. P. Taylor (1929–1981), playwright
- Hannah Frank (1908–2008), artist and sculptor
- Jack Milroy (1915–2001), comedian
- Mohammad Akhtar (MC-VA) (1986–), musician
- Robbie McCallum (1967–), screenwriter

=== Sport ===
- Dan Drummond (1891–1949), footballer
- David Davidson (1934–), footballer
- Jim Blyth (1890–?), footballer
- Jimmy Speirs (1886–1917), footballer
- Jimmy Mallan (1927–1969), footballer
- John McGeady (1958–), footballer
- Bobby Collins (1931–2014), footballer

=== Medicine ===
- Dame Katherine Christie Watt (1886–1963), British military nurse, nursing administrator and civil servant
- R. D. Laing (1927–1989), psychiatrist
