= Govanhill Picture House =

Historic building in Glasgow, Scotland

Coordinates: 55.83598°N 4.25595°W

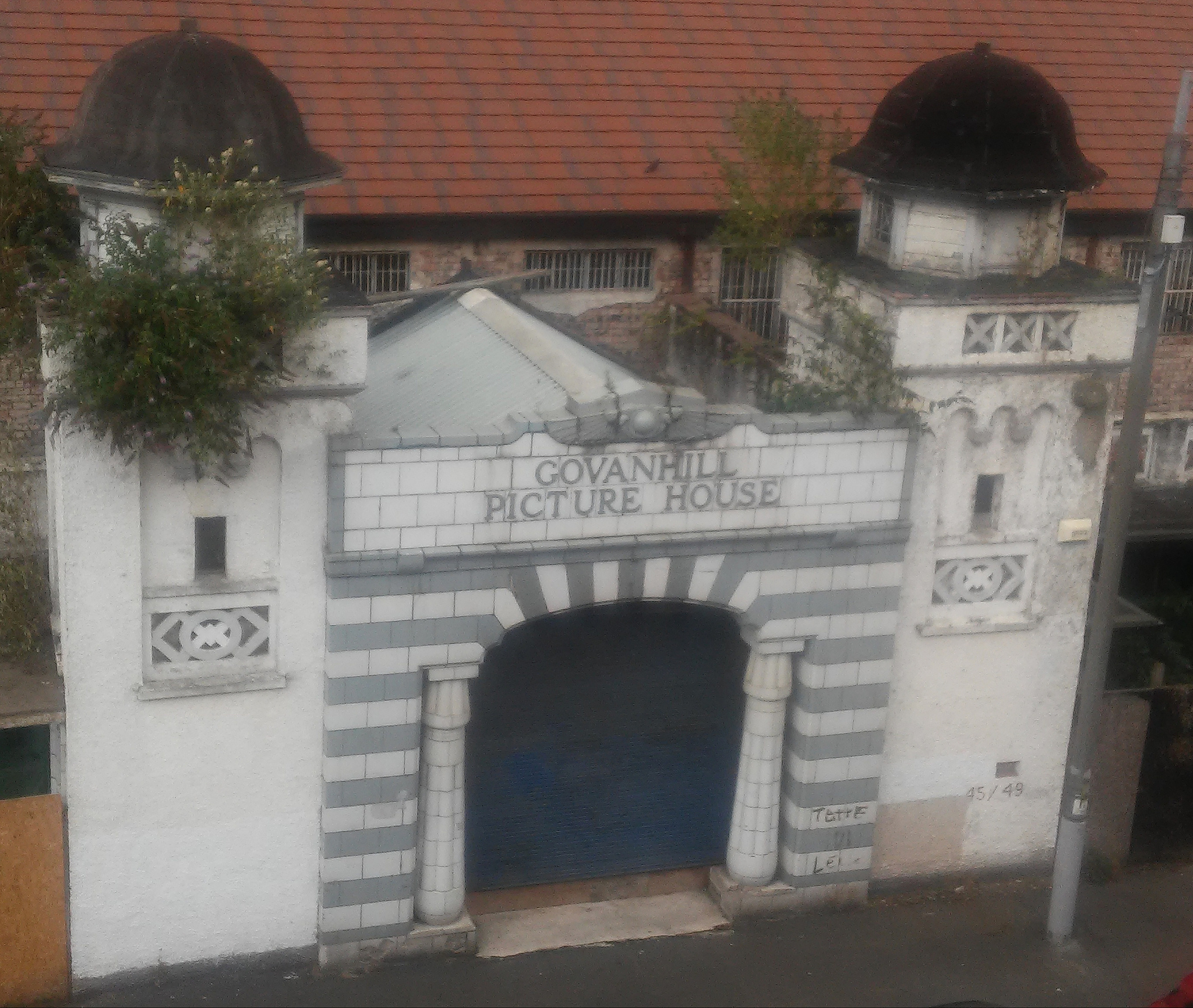

Govanhill Picture House based in Govanhill, Glasgow, was an Egyptian-themed cinema built in 1926 which was designed by architect Eric A. Sutherland and seated 1,200. It remained in use as a cinema until 1961 and then as a bingo hall till 1974. It was the warehouse and head office of John Greenlees Ltd shoe shops from the early 60s until late 1980s. Subsequently, the building was used as a warehouse.

The building was re-roofed in 2012 due to its poor state of repair and general neglect.

In 2018, plans were unveiled that the B-listed cinema was to be used again for its original purpose by Queer Classics Film Festival (QCFF). The event that took take place in August 2018 had the backing of Glasgow School of Art and University of Glasgow, the latter being where event organiser Lydia Honeybone is studying a postgraduate degree in Curatorial Practice.

as of 2025 it contains a Halal Grocer and also a Fabric shop.

currently there is no cinema in govanhill.

“I have long been fascinated by Govanhill Picture House, it’s been a dream of mine for years now to hold an event there and partially the reason I moved to the Southside"

In September 2019, the building was used again as a cinema with the screening of the 1920s film, The Open Road. The event was co-organised by Lydia Honeybone and Shireen Taylor as Glasgow Artists’ Moving Image Studios (GAMIS).
