= Tango in the Attic =

Scottish pop band

- Origin: Glenrothes, Scotland
- Genres: Garage rock; pop
- Years active: 2008–present
- Members: Jordan Craig; Paul Johnson; Jonathan MacFarlane; James Crook
- Past members: Daniel Craig

Tango in the Attic are a Scottish Garage rock and pop band from Glenrothes, formed in 2008. The band consists of Daniel Craig (vocals), Jordan Craig (guitar), Jonathan MacFarlane (organ), James Crook (bass), and Paul Johnson (drums).

== History ==
=== 2008–2010 ===
Tango in the Attic formed in early 2008 in Glenrothes, Fife. The band's members are influenced by various artists. Using guitars, vintage organs, saxophones and random percussion, they give energetic and engaging live performances, and have been described as "Vampire Weekend-esque".

The band played 2009's T in the Park festival's Tbreak tent, followed by a live session on Vic Galloway's BBC Radio One show. Their track "Jackanory" was used on Schuh’s first television advertisement, which was broadcast throughout the UK. They also released the double A-side single, "Blunderground"/"Be a Familiar".

== Band lineup ==
Prior to the creation of Tango in the Attic's 2012 album Sellotape, Daniel Craig decided to leave the band citing difficulties regarding the more extensive touring which was planned for the upcoming album. Rather than replace Craig, the band made the decision to remain as a four-piece with Jordan taking over vocal duties.

== Discography ==
The band's debut album, Bank Place Locomotive Society, was released on 12 July 2010. Track listing

1. "One Step Away"
2. "Seven Second Stare"
3. "Off To..."
4. "Sketch by Quentin Blake"
5. "A Healthy Distraction"
6. "One Step Ahead"
7. "Jackanory"
8. "Leftside"
9. "Whiskey in the Wind"
10. "Blunderground"
11. "She Stole the Summer"
12. "The Letting Go"

The band's second release, Sellotape, was released on 28 May 2012, and has appeared in music charts in the United States (No. 69 in CMJ top 200 as of 21 August 2012). Track listing

1. "Stitch"
2. "Paw Prints"
3. "The Paradise Institute"
4. "198 Alpaca"
5. "Sunscream"
6. "Mona Lisa Overdrive"
7. "Chewing Gum"
8. "Swimming Pool"
9. "Family Sucks"
