= Ibrox =

Ibrox, from the Scottish Gaelic term for badger den, may refer to:

- Ibrox, Glasgow, a district of the city of Glasgow in western Scotland
- Ibrox Stadium, the home of Rangers Football Club
  - 1902 Ibrox disaster
  - 1971 Ibrox disaster
  - Ibrox Park (1887–99), previous home ground of Rangers F.C.
- Ibrox railway station, closed 1967
- Ibrox subway station, part of the Glasgow subway system
- Ibrox Primary School
