= Cessnock, Glasgow =

District of Glasgow, Scotland

Coordinates: 55.8522°N 4.2986°W

Cessnock
- Location within Glasgow
- OS grid reference: NS562645
- Council area: Glasgow City Council
- Lieutenancy area: Glasgow
- Country: Scotland
- Sovereign state: United Kingdom
- Post town: GLASGOW
- Postcode district: G51
- Dialling code: 0141
- Police: Scotland
- Fire: Scottish
- Ambulance: Scottish
- UK Parliament: Glasgow Central
- Scottish Parliament: Glasgow Southside

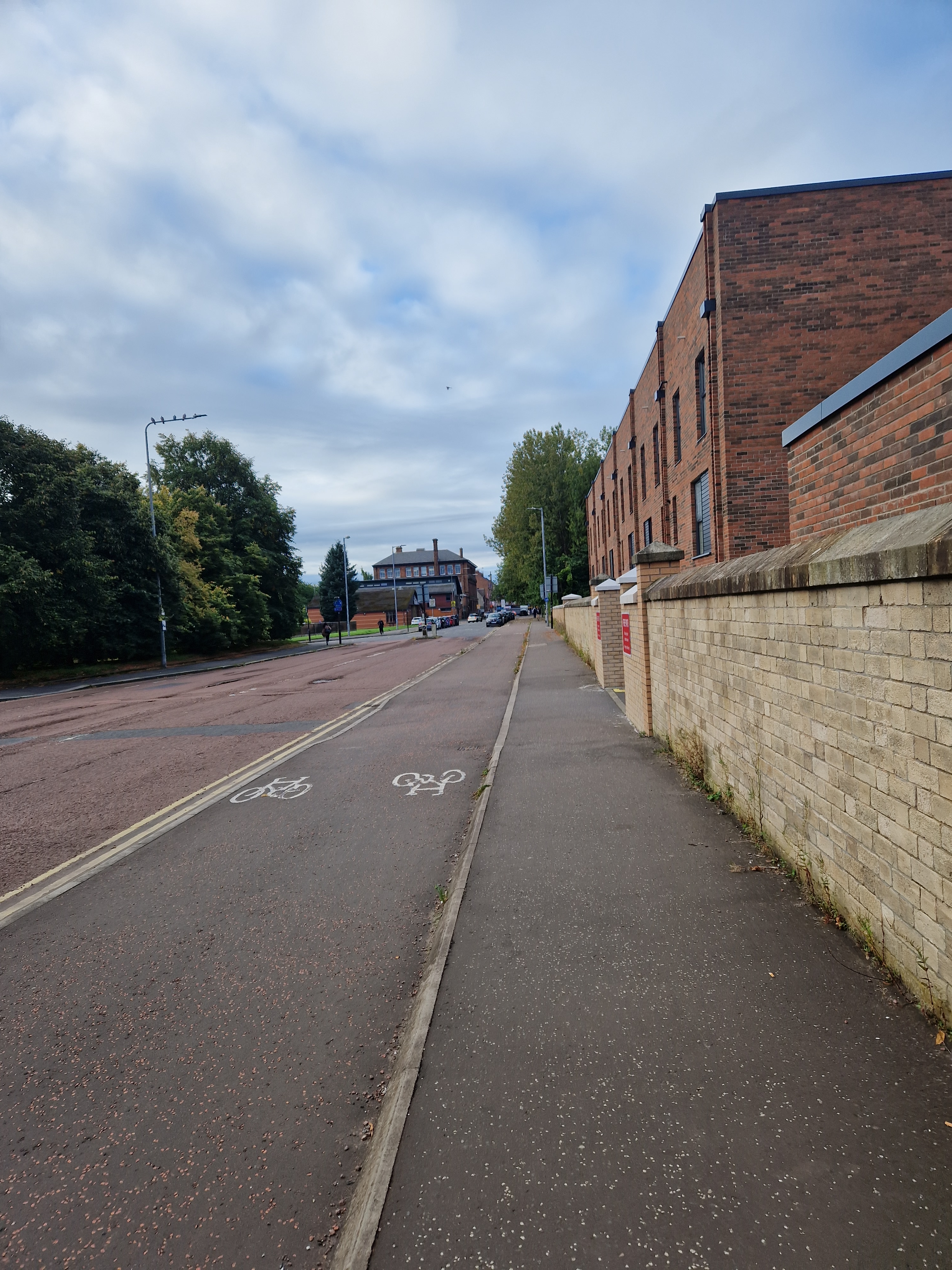
A street in Cessnock

Cessnock (/ˈsɛsnək/) is an area in the city of Glasgow, Scotland. It is situated south of the River Clyde and was part of the former Burgh of Govan. Cessnock's main street is Paisley Road West, which runs west in the direction of Paisley and east through Kinning Park to Paisley Toll.

== Transport ==
This area is served by Cessnock subway station. Many buses stop on Paisley Road West, most frequently the Number 9 route, offering fast access east-bound to City Centre, and west-bound to Govan and Paisley.

Dumbreck railway station can be reached via a footbridge which crosses the M8 motorway at Clifford Street. Exhibition Centre railway station can be reached from Cessnock by following the route to the SECC.

== Landmarks ==
- Walmer Crescent designed by Alexander "Greek" Thomson
- Cessnock subway station

== Architecture ==
Walmer Crescent, a curved tenement building designed by one of Glasgow's most famous architects, Alexander "Greek" Thomson, is situated within Cessnock.

BBC Scotland's headquarters stand ten minutes' walk north of Cessnock at Pacific Quay. The building was opened in 2007 and designed by David Chipperfield Architects.

House for an Art Lover designed, by another famous Glasgow architect, Charles Rennie Mackintosh, is situated in Bellahouston Park on the southern boundary of Cessnock.

== Parks ==
Festival Park is to the North and Plantation Park to the East. Bellahouston Park and Pollok Park are within walking distance.

== Adjoining districts ==
- Kinning Park
- Bellahouston Park
- Ibrox
