= Ibrox disaster =

The Ibrox disasters refers to two accidents, both at football games held at Ibrox Park (now Ibrox Stadium) in Glasgow, Scotland:

- The 1902 Ibrox disaster was a partial stadium collapse that caused 25 deaths and 517 injuries
- The 1971 Ibrox disaster was a crowd crush in a stairway, causing 66 deaths and over 200 injuries, at an Old Firm match
