= Our Lady and St Margaret's Primary School =

Primary school in Glasgow, Scotland

Coordinates: 55.852°N 4.280°W

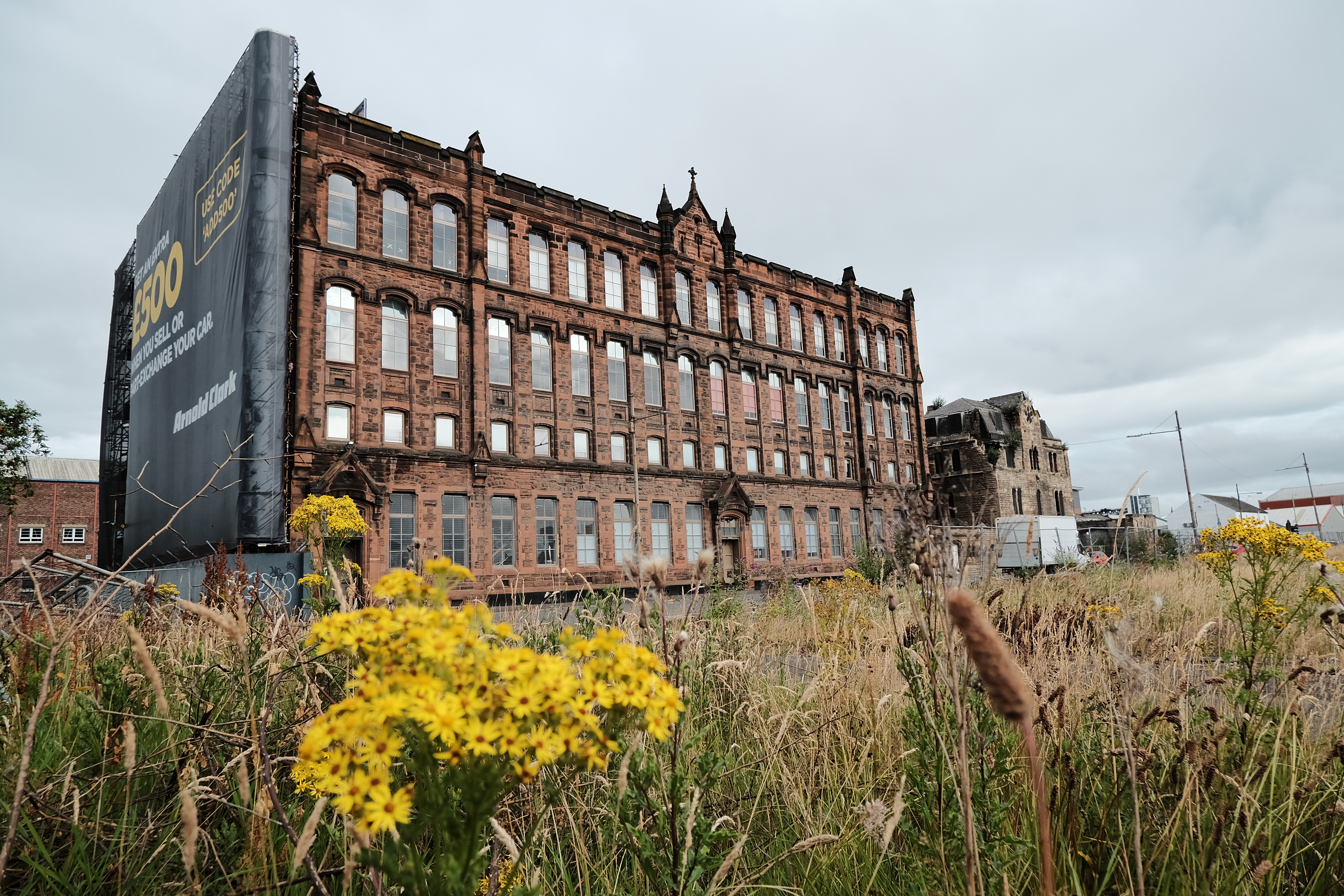

Our Lady and St Margaret's Primary School is a former Catholic primary school located at Stanley Street, Kinning Park, Glasgow, Scotland. In earlier years it was a junior secondary school. The annex of this school was located in the nearby Admiral Street Infants School. The school, designed by the architects Bruce & Hay, was established in 1910. Bruce & Hay were known for their work designing warehouses and offices and critics have compared the school's appearance to that of a warehouse. It was closed in 1996–97.

This is a Category C(s) listed building as a good example of a school building on a palazzo scale. In addition to the school, there was a presbytery in the building that was opened in 1882. Of particular interest are the upper-storey playgrounds. The school building is still intact at present.
