= Cessnock subway station =

Glasgow subway station

Cessnock An Seasganach
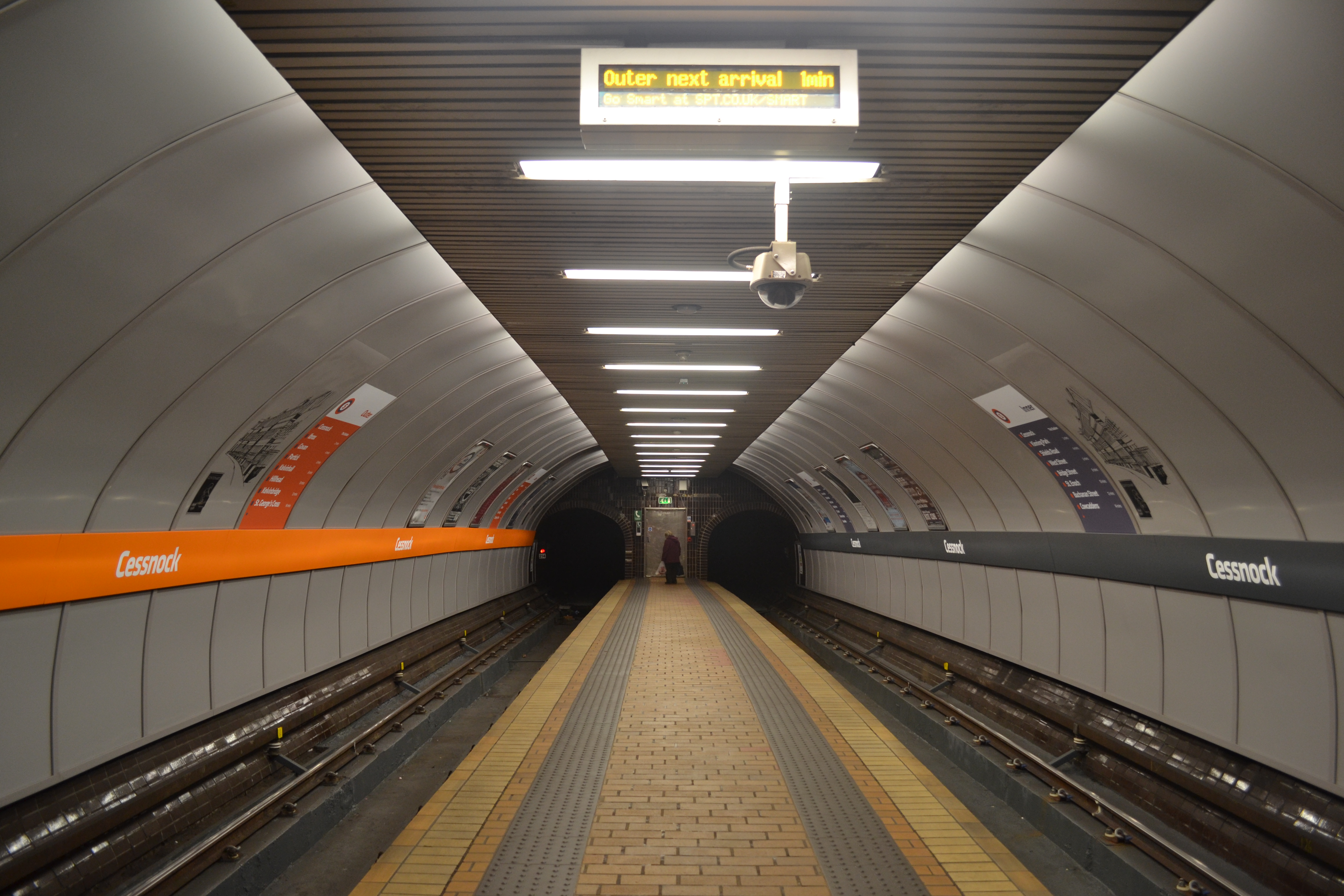

General information
- Location: Cessnock, Glasgow; Scotland
- Coordinates: 55°51′09″N 4°17′45″W
- Operator: SPT
- Transit authority: SPT
- Platforms: 1

Construction
- Structure type: underground
- Accessible: No

Other information
- Fare zone: 1

History
- Opened: 14 December 1896
- Rebuilt: 16 April 1980; 46 years ago

Passengers
- 2018: 0.934 million annually

Services
Preceding station	SPT	Following station
Kinning Park anticlockwise / inner circle	Glasgow Subway	Ibrox clockwise / outer circle
Location

Cessnock subway station (Scottish Gaelic: An Seasganach) is a station on the Glasgow Subway that serves the eastern part of Ibrox and the Cessnock area of the city. It is also the nearest station to Festival Park. Along with Kelvinhall, it is one of only two stations to retain its pre-modernisation surface buildings and entryway. It is also the only station to retain its pre-modernisation livery and signage. The entrance is at the east end of Walmer Crescent and leads under the residential housing.

It was opened in 1896 and modernised in 1977–1980. The station retains its original island platform configuration, and has no escalators. In 1989 when work was being carried out to restore an adjoining building designed by Alexander Greek Thomson two metal arches bearing the station's name and in a style echoing that of Greek Thomson were added at street level. The idea was that these would draw attention to the steps down to the station's entrance which is located in the basement of a tenement, just below street level. When they were to be removed in a later renovation of the station, public opposition forced the restoration of one of the arches which had been taken down, and ended plans to remove the other.

There are 520,000 boardings per year at this station.

The station is located close to the Glasgow Science Centre, BBC Scotland, STV Studios, and the SEC Centre.

Ceessnock is one of the stations mentioned in Cliff Hanley's song The Glasgow Underground.

== Past passenger numbers ==
- 2004/05: 0.520 million annually
- 2011/12: 0.473 million annually

== Gallery ==
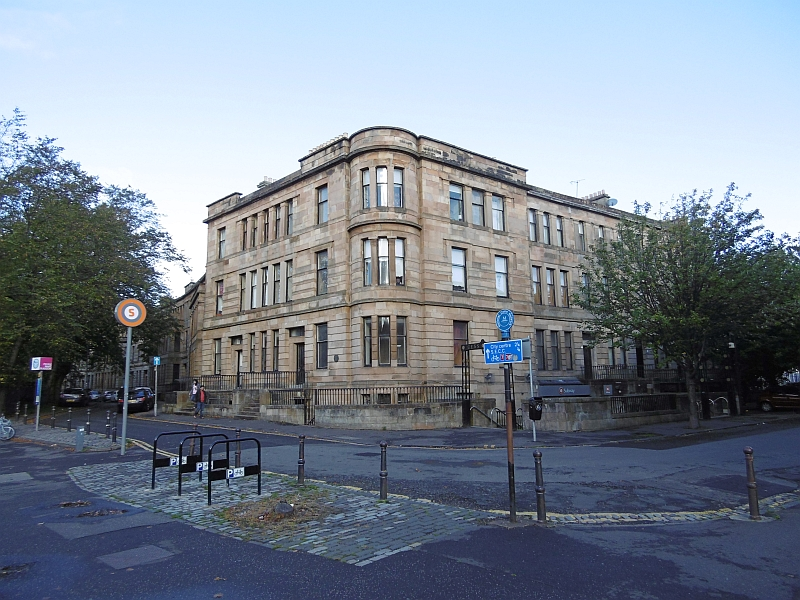
Exterior from a distance

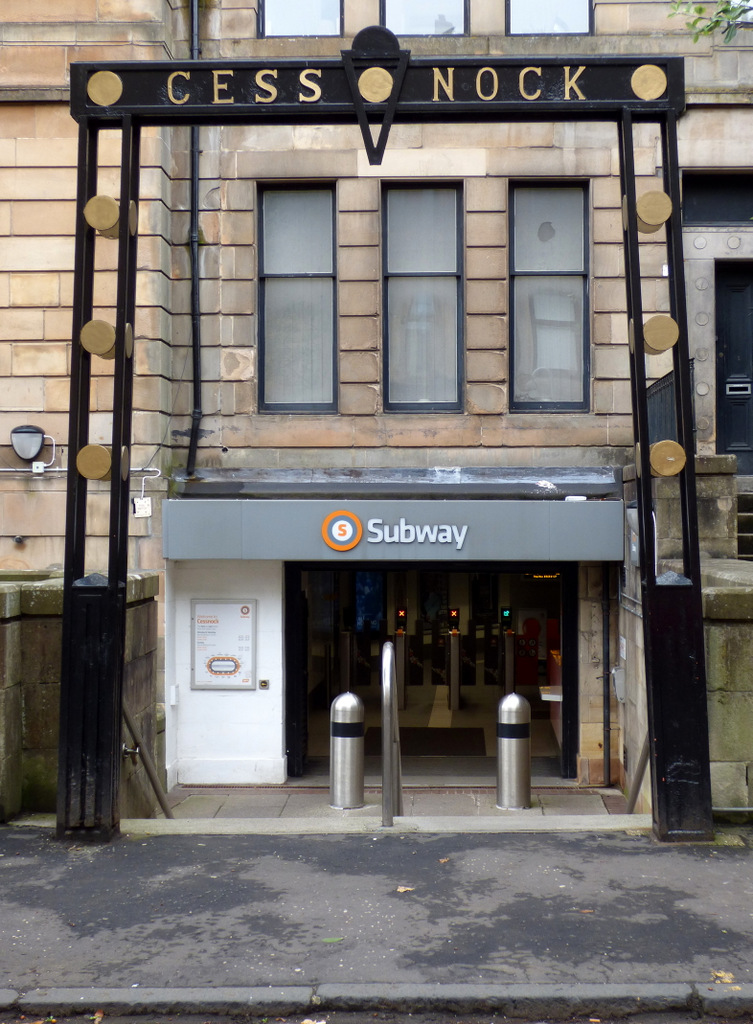
Looking into the station hall

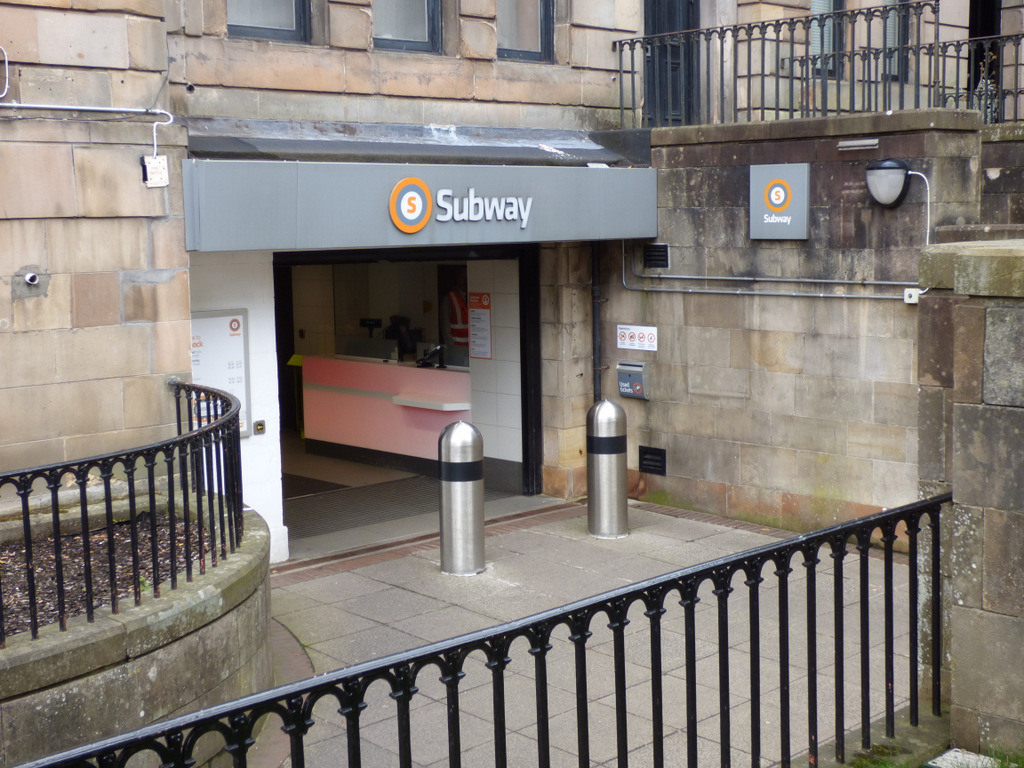
Entrance

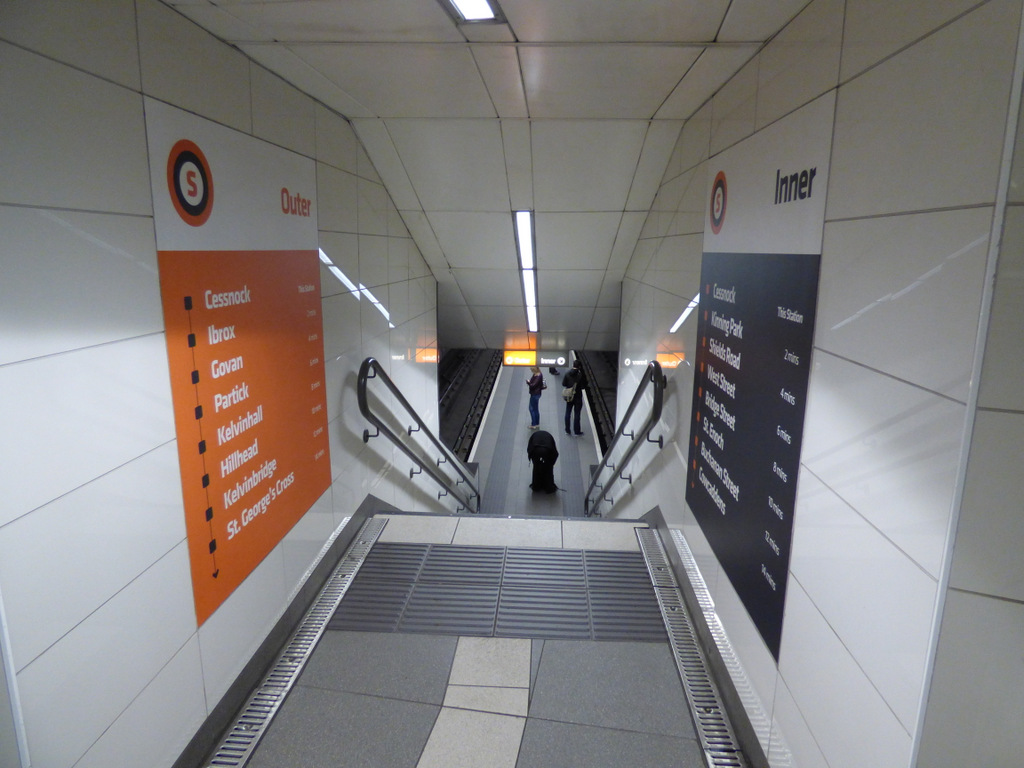
Stairs to the platforms

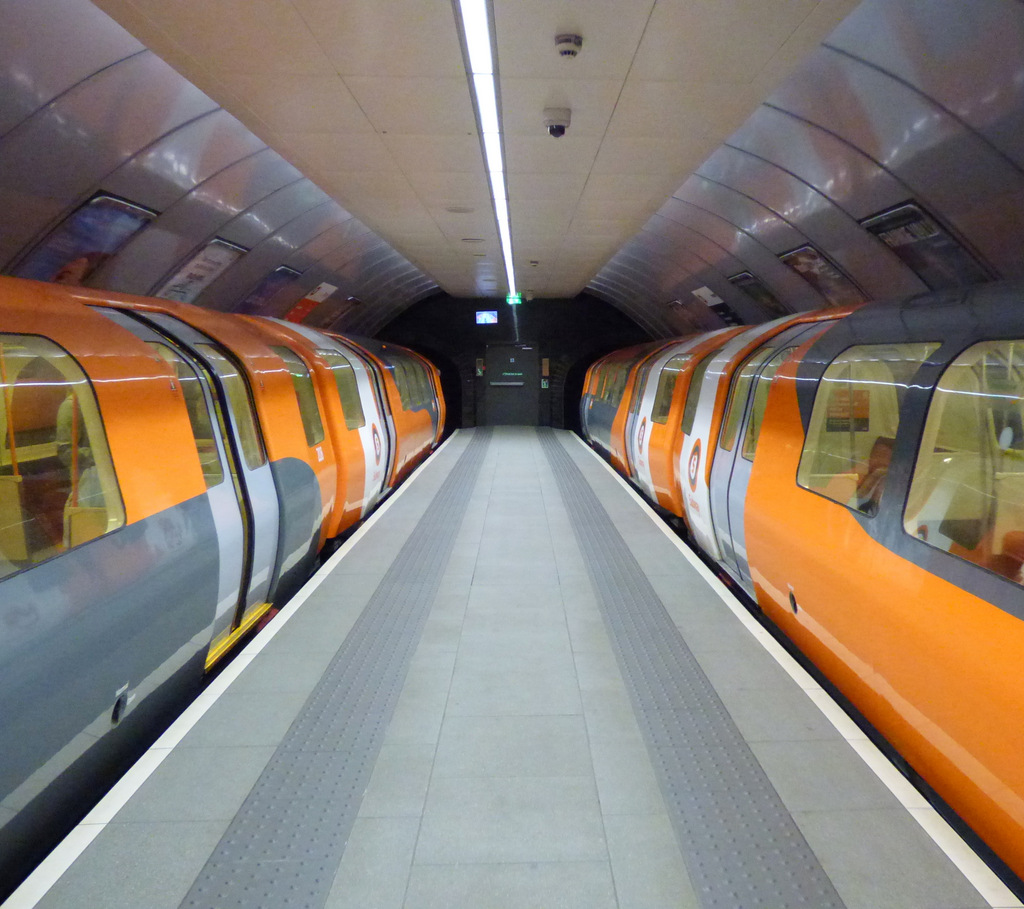
Trains at both platforms
