= Ibrox Stadium =

Football stadium in Glasgow

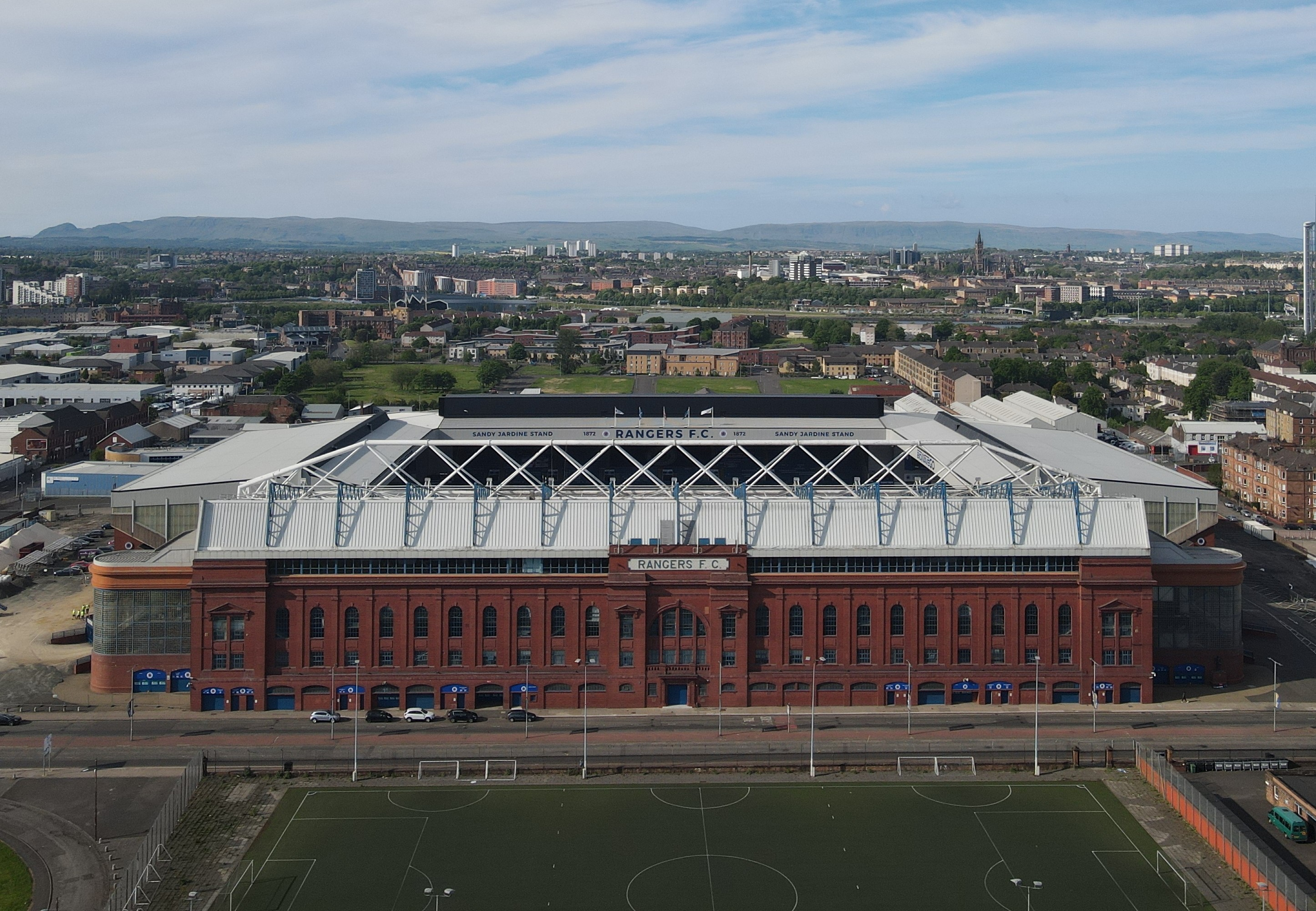
- Aerial view of Ibrox Stadium, 2021; UEFA

- Location in Glasgow
- Former names: Ibrox Park (1899–1997)
- Location: 150 Edmiston Drive; Glasgow; G51 2XD
- Coordinates: 55°51′11″N 4°18′33″W
- Owner: Rangers
- Capacity: 51,700
- Surface: Desso Grass Hybrid (2021–present)
- Record attendance: 118,567 (v Celtic, 1939)
- Field size: 114.8 × 74.3 yards (105 × 68 metres)
- Public transit: Ibrox; Govan

Construction
- Groundbreaking: 1899
- Opened: 30 December 1899
- Renovated: 1928 (Main Stand); 1978–1981 (Copland Stand, Broomloan Stand and Govan Stand); 1990–1991 (Main Stand Club Deck); 2024 (Copland Stand)
- Architects: Archibald Leitch (1928); The Miller Partnership (1978–1981); Gareth Hutchison (1990–1991)

Tenants
- Rangers (1899–Present); Rangers Women (2025–Present)

Ibrox Stadium is a football stadium on the south side of the River Clyde in the Ibrox area of Glasgow, Scotland. The home of Scottish Premiership team Rangers, Ibrox is the third-largest football stadium in Scotland, with an all-seated capacity of 51,700. The stadium was designed by renowned football stadium architect Archibald Leitch, with renovations to the stadium between 1978 and 1981, as well as 1990 and 1991, being designed by The Miller Partnership and Gareth Hutchison respectively.

Opened as Ibrox Park in 1899, it suffered a disaster in 1902 when a wooden terrace collapsed. Vast earthen terraces were built in its place, and a main stand, now a listed building, in 1928. A British record crowd of 118,567 gathered in January 1939 for a league match with Celtic. After another disaster in 1971, the stadium was largely rebuilt. The vast bowl-shaped terracing was removed and replaced by three rectangular, all-seated stands by 1981. After renovations were completed in 1997, the ground was renamed Ibrox Stadium.

Ibrox hosted the Scotland national team when Hampden Park was redeveloped in the 1990s, and three Scottish cup finals in the same period, and has also been a concert venue. The stadium hosted the rugby sevens at the 2014 Commonwealth Games held in Scotland.

== History ==
=== First Ibrox (1872–1902) ===
Rangers played its first match in May 1872, on Glasgow Green. The club then played home matches on public pitches across Glasgow, first moving to a regular home ground at Burnbank in 1875. A year later, Rangers played at the Clydesdale cricket ground in Kinning Park. This ground was improved to give a capacity of 7,000, but it was not owned by Rangers. After hints by the landlords that they wished to develop the site, Rangers left in February 1887. The club shared Cathkin Park with Third Lanark for the remainder of the 1886–87 season.

Rangers first moved to the Ibrox area later in 1887, playing on a site immediately to the east of the current stadium. The first match at this stadium was an 8–1 defeat to English side Preston North End on 20 August 1887, watched by a capacity crowd of over 15,000. This inaugural match had to be abandoned after 70 minutes due to a pitch invasion. The first Ibrox Park was a success in the short term, as three Scotland international matches and the 1890 Scottish Cup final were played at the ground. Celtic Park, built in 1892, was more advanced, however. Rangers opted to construct a new stadium, raising funds by forming a limited company. The last match at the old ground was played on 9 December 1899. The new Ibrox Park was formally opened with a 3–1 victory over Hearts on 30 December.

=== Ibrox Park and Ibrox disaster (1902–1928) ===
The pavilion of the second Ibrox Park. Built 1899, demolished 1928.

Ibrox Park, as it was known between 1899 and 1997, is almost completely different from the Ibrox Stadium of today. It followed the model of most Scottish stadiums of the time, comprising an oval track around the pitch, with a pavilion and one stand along one side. The ground had a capacity of 40,000. Celtic Park, Ibrox and Hampden Park all competed with each other to host Scottish Cup finals and Scotland matches, one of which could generate up to £1,000 in revenue for the host club. To aid their chances of gaining that revenue, Rangers constructed a large terracing, holding 36,000 people, behind the western goalmouth. The terracing, designed by Archibald Leitch, was formed by wooden planks bolted onto a framework made of iron. A similar wooden terracing was constructed at the eastern end, giving a total capacity of 75,000.

The structure was passed by the Govan Burgh Surveyor in March 1902, but there were newspaper reports that it was unstable. A crowd of 68,114 assembled for a Scotland v England match on 5 April 1902, but shortly after the kick-off one section of the terracing "collapsed like a trap door". A gap of 20 square yards appeared, causing about 125 people to fall to the ground 50 feet below the terracing. Most survived due to the fact they fell on top of other bodies, but 25 people were killed. 517 people were injured, some due to being crushed in the panic caused by the collapse.

Most people in the stadium were unaware that the (first) Ibrox disaster had happened. People even re-occupied the damaged area, despite the danger of further collapse. A definite reason for the disaster was not agreed upon, partly because there was no public inquiry held. Some experts blamed the quality of wood and the supplier was tried for culpable homicide, but was acquitted. The design was also cited as a possible cause. Generally, wooden structures of that size were not trusted. Rangers removed the wooden terraces, reducing capacity to 25,000. The criticism of the design did not deter Rangers from hiring Leitch in the future. He designed an expansion of Ibrox to a 63,000 capacity by 1910, using slopes made of earth. By this point, the city of Glasgow had the three largest purpose-built football grounds in the world.

=== Renovations (1928–1953) ===
Rangers play Motherwell at Ibrox Park in 1920. The pavilion and grandstand that can be seen on the right of the pitch, were replaced by the Bill Struth stand in 1928. The 'Bovril Stand' (North Stand) can be seen on the left.

The next major redevelopment occurred in 1928, after Rangers had won their first double. A new Main Stand, to the south side of the ground, was opened on 1 January 1929. The Main Stand, which has the familiar Leitch style criss-cross balcony and a red-brick facade, seated 10,000 people and provided standing accommodation in an enclosure. Simon Inglis, a writer on football stadia, commented in 2005 that the Main Stand is Leitch's "greatest work" and is "still resplendent today in its red brick glory under a modern mantle of glass and steel". The architectural significance of the Main Stand was reflected when it became a Category B listed building in 1987. Original seats in the Main Stand were made of cast iron and oak. One was auctioned in 2011 for £1,080.

The banking of the terracing continued to increase in the 1930s. On 2 January 1939, the Old Firm game against Celtic attracted a crowd of 118,567, the record attendance for any league match played in Britain. At this point, Ibrox was the second-largest stadium in Britain.

=== Post-war, re-design and new name (1953–1997) ===
Floodlights were first used at Ibrox in December 1953, for a friendly match against Arsenal. The first floodlit Scottish league match was played at Ibrox, in March 1956. Covers were built over the north and east terracing during the 1960s. No structural changes were made to Ibrox, but capacity was cut to approximately 80,000 by safety legislation.

Ibrox Park had the worst fan safety record in Britain before its complete redesign and renaming in 1997. Two fans died in September 1961 when a barrier collapsed on Stairway 13, resulting in a crush. Stairway 13 was a popular exit from the East Terracing due to its proximity to Copland Road subway station and parking areas for the Rangers supporters' coaches, but it was often overcrowded and very steep. After this incident, Rangers installed safety measures, but further injuries were sustained in crushes on Stairway 13 in both 1967 and 1969. On 23 October 1968, the main stand at Ibrox was hit by fire. Just seven months later there was another fire, which destroyed more than 200 seats behind the directors box. The worst disaster to date to affect football in Britain happened after the Old Firm game on 2 January 1971, when 66 people died of asphyxiation due to another crush on Stairway 13. The game itself ended in a 1–1 draw, with Colin Stein scoring a late equalising goal for Rangers. This led to a widespread belief that the crush had been caused by fans who had left the game early, but had turned back when they heard the roar that greeted the Rangers goal. A public inquiry discounted this initial story. It established that the crowd had been travelling in the same direction when the crush happened, with it perhaps being precipitated by some bending over to pick up items that had been discarded during the goal celebrations. The downward force of the crowd leaving the stadium meant that when people started to fall there was no means of preventing a crush.

The inquiry and subsequent compensation cases found that Rangers had been inept in their administration and complacent after the incidents in the 1960s. The disaster also highlighted, however, the fact that there were no established safety standards that should be adhered to, let alone any means of enforcing such standards. This had been first recommended nearly 50 years earlier, after the 1923 FA Cup final. The Guide to Safety at Sports Grounds was published in 1973, and legislation was enacted with the Safety of Sports Grounds Act 1975. This law cut the capacity of Ibrox to 65,000. In the short term, Rangers took the stopgap measure of installing benches in the North Stand, which was renamed the Centenary Stand.

=== Ibrox Stadium (1997–present) ===
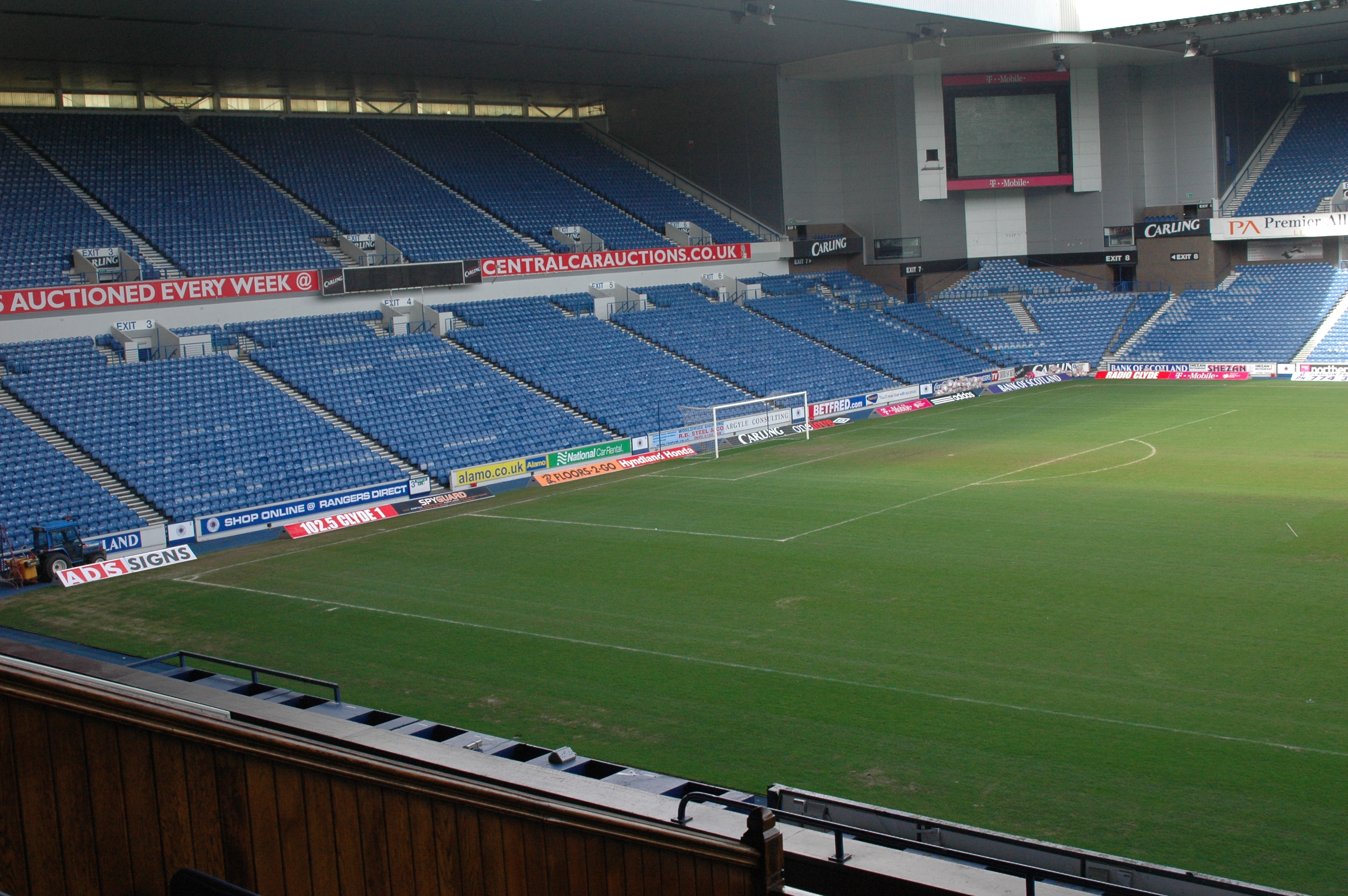
A view of the Broomloan and Govan Stands in 2006. The corner between the two stands was filled in during the late 1990s.

The 1971 Ibrox disaster led to the club developing a modern, safe stadium. Willie Waddell visited modern grounds in West Germany during the 1974 World Cup and believed that steep terracing and exits, such as Stairway 13, had to be replaced. The cut in capacity and boardroom changes led to radical plans by architects Miller Partnership, which were published in November 1977. The plans were modelled on the Westfalenstadion, home ground of Borussia Dortmund. They involved a radical reshaping of the stadium, with the old bowl-shaped terracing to be replaced by three new all-seated structures. Only the old Main Stand would remain, with its enclosure providing the only standing room in the ground.

Although later events, such as the Hillsborough disaster and the subsequent Taylor Report, vindicated this plan, Rangers were taking a significant risk. The whole plan was estimated to cost £6 million, which no other club could have afforded in a short period of time. The development was funded by the Rangers football pools operation, which was the largest club-based scheme in Britain. The first phase of the plan, which began in 1978, was the removal of the east terracing and its replacement with the Copland Road stand. The same process was repeated on the west side of the ground a year later, with the two identical stands each holding 7,500 seats. The redevelopment was completed in 1981 with the replacement of the Centenary Stand by the 10,300 capacity Govan Stand.

The new Ibrox had a capacity of 44,000 and was opened with an Old Firm game played on 19 September 1981. By this time, however, the development cost had risen to £10 million, which depleted the club financially. This resulted in a difficult period in the history of Rangers, as the average attendance fell to 17,500 in the 1981–82 season, including a crowd of only 4,500 for a game against St Mirren. (Note: Rangers: The Complete Record (Breedon Books, 2005) states the attendance for the match against St Mirren was 6,000.) The redeveloped stadium was partly blamed for this, as some fans felt that the new ground lacked atmosphere due to the spaces between the stands. This was during a period of low attendances in Scottish football in general, but also because of Rangers' generally poor performance at the time - between 1979 and 1986, Rangers never finished higher than 3rd. Despite this, Rangers had the highest average home attendances in the Premier Division in both 1983–84 and 1984–85.

This all changed when a new regime, chaired by David Holmes, took control of Rangers in 1986. Graeme Souness was appointed player–manager, while several English stars, including Terry Butcher and Chris Woods, were signed. Season ticket sales rose from 7,000 in 1986 to over 30,000 in the 1990s, while commercial income increased from £239,000 in 1986 to over £2 million in 1989. The introduction of computerised ticketing, zonal public address systems and closed-circuit television for monitoring turnstile areas meant that Ibrox was at the forefront of stadium management. Rangers also adopted the American technique of analysing the types of fans in each area of the stadium and adjusted their food stalls accordingly. Greater success on the pitch meant that Ibrox demonstrated that seated stadiums would be welcomed by most fans, if designed and fitted well.

== Structure and facilities ==
=== Stadium design ===
Ibrox Stadium layout

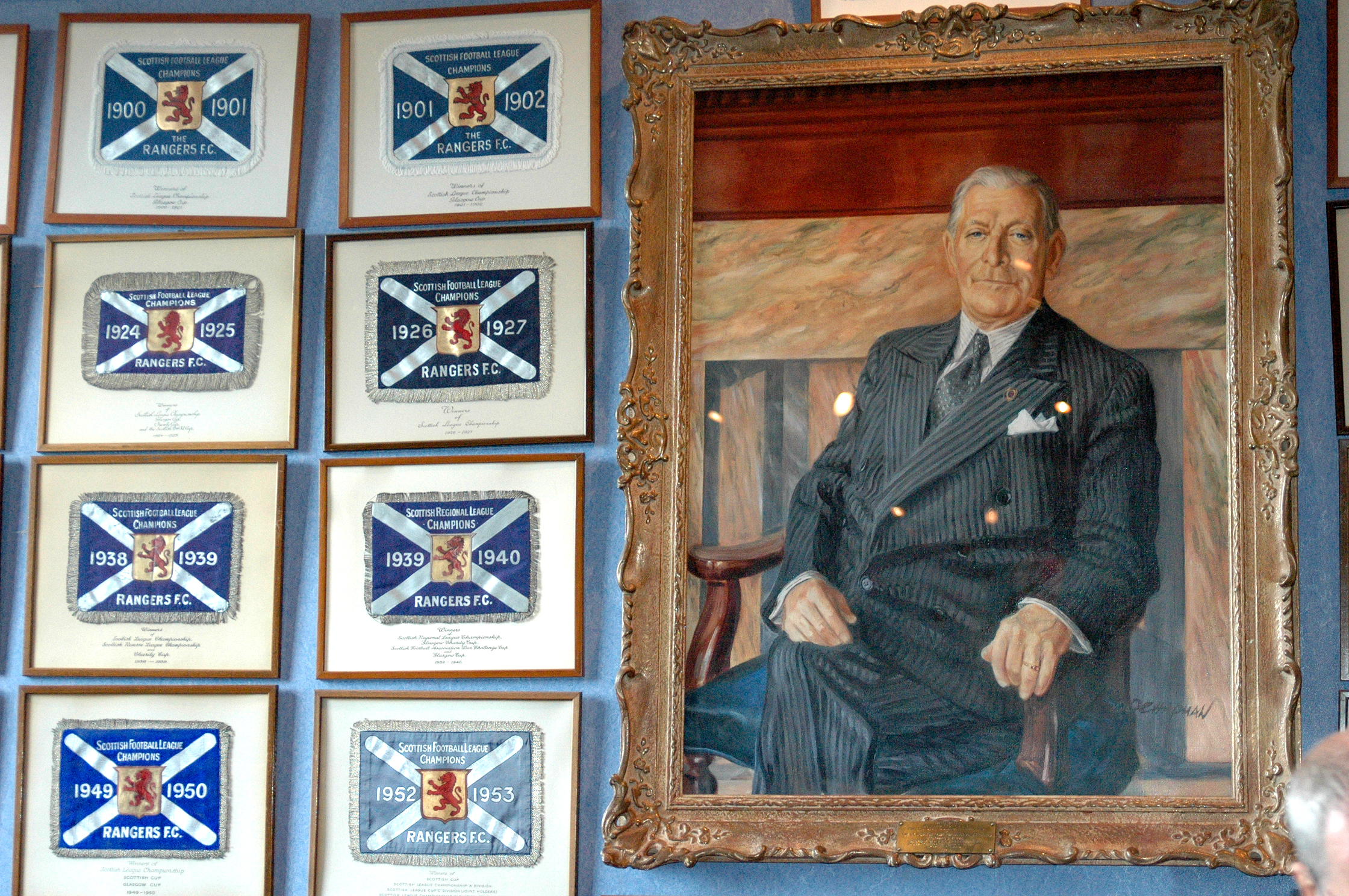
Trophy room, featuring a portrait of Bill Struth.

The Ibrox pitch is surrounded by four covered all-seater stands, officially known as the Bill Struth Main (south), Broomloan Road (west), Sandy Jardine (north) and Copland Road (east) Stands. Three stands have two tiers; the Bill Struth Main Stand has three tiers since the Club Deck was added in 1991. The two corner areas, known as the West and East areas of the Sandy Jardine Stand, have one tier of seating below a JumboTron screen.

The Bill Struth Main Stand, formerly known as the Main Stand, faces onto Edmiston Drive (A8 road). The red-brick facade, designed by Archibald Leitch, is a Category B listed building. Simon Inglis, writing in 1996, described it as an "imposing red-brick facade, with its mock neo-classical arched, square and pedimented windows, exudes prestige and power." On each end wall the club crest is depicted in a blue and gold mosaic. Stairtowers leading to the Club Deck (third tier) stand at each end of the Main Stand. These towers are also framed in red-brick, but deliberately contrast with the main body of the stand. The two stairtowers also support a 146 m (479 ft) long and 540 t (530-long-ton; 600-short-ton) truss, claimed to be the longest and heaviest clear span girder in the world.

Through the main doors of the Main Stand is a wood-panelled hallway. A marble staircase leads to the boardroom and trophy room. Since Graeme Souness' time in charge, the wood panelled home dressing room traditionally has a portrait of the reigning monarch on the wall. Inglis compared Ibrox to Highbury, in that it combined corporate power with a sense of tradition and solidity. It was originally constructed as a 10,000-seat stand above a standing enclosure. It was redeveloped in the early 1990s with the addition of the Club Deck and seating in the enclosure. It is now a three-tier all-seated structure, accommodating approximately 21,000 spectators. The front wall of the middle tier is one of the last surviving examples of the Leitch style of criss-cross detailing. The middle tier is split into front and rear sections, while the enclosure is split into east and west sections, either side of the retractable tunnel cover.

Opposite the Bill Struth Main Stand is the Sandy Jardine Stand formerly known as the Govan Stand. It is a two-tier stand, similar in style to the two end stands, which was completed in 1981. To the rear of the Govan Stand is the Argyle House extension, completed in 1990, which provides executive boxes, hospitality areas and office space. The Bar 72 area was added to the rear section of the Govan Stand in 2006. The Copland Road Stand, at the east end of the stadium, was completed in 1979 and now accommodates just over 8,000 fans. It is traditionally the 'Rangers end' of the ground and the team normally chooses to attack that end in the second half of matches. The western Broomloan Road Stand, which was completed in 1980, is identical to the opposite end. Although constructed as separate structures, the three stands have been linked since the mid-1990s, when two additional areas of seating were added to the corner areas. All of the stands are designed using the 'goalpost' structure, in which a large portal frame supports perpendicular beams on which roof cladding is secured. The Rangers Store is located in the corner between the Copland Road and Govan Stands.

Away fans are normally accommodated in the corner of the ground between the Broomloan and Govan Stands. Ibrox is seen as being an intimidating ground for visiting supporters. Rangers banned Celtic fans in 1994 from attending games at Ibrox, citing the damage caused to the Broomloan Stand by the visitors in previous derbies. The ban was lifted after one game, as the Scottish Football League passed a resolution preventing clubs from taking that action. Before the corners were filled in, away fans were accommodated in the lower tier of the Broomloan Stand. Rangers had to take action in 1996 to prevent their fans in the upper deck from throwing items at visitors. Celtic fans were normally given the whole of the Broomloan Stand for Old Firm derbies until 2018, when Rangers opted to restrict their allocation to the much smaller corner section.

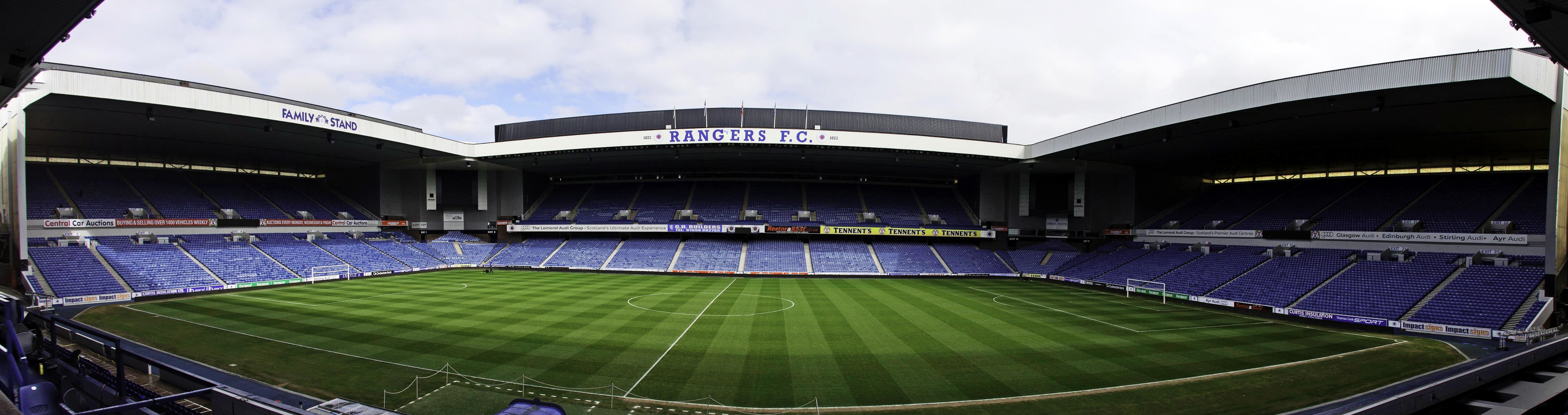
A panorama of Ibrox Stadium taken from the Bill Struth Main Stand, showing from left to right the Broomloan Road Stand, the Sandy Jardine Stand and the Copland Road Stand

=== Club Deck ===
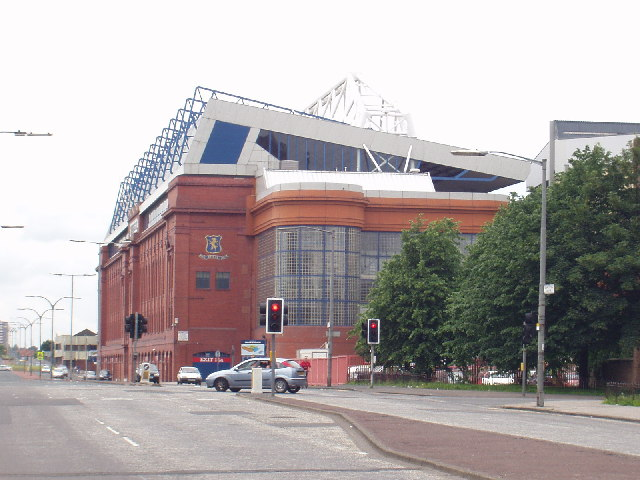
A view of the Main Stand in 2005. The Club Deck (white) was constructed above the 1928 Main Stand in the early 1990s. The brick and glass construction in front is an enclosed stairwell to the upper deck.

David Murray acquired control of Rangers in November 1988. Argyle House, a £4 million extension behind the Govan Stand, was opened in 1990. This added executive boxes, office space and hospitality suites. A further series of developments was started in the early 1990s to increase capacity to over 50,000. Murray commissioned architect Gareth Hutchison to find a way of adding a third tier to the Main Stand. This was a highly complex process, as the Main Stand facade had become a listed building and Murray wanted the existing structure to remain open during construction. The contractors removed the original roof and added a temporary cover while the work carried on above. The Club Deck, which cost approximately £20 million, was opened with a league match against Dundee United in December 1991. The redevelopment of the Main Stand was partially financed by a Football Trust grant of £2 million and a debenture issue that raised £8.5 million. Ordinary fans bought debentures for between £1,000 and £1,650 each, which guaranteed the right to buy season tickets for at least 30 years, along with some other minor benefits.

Four columns were built through the existing Main Stand to support the Club Deck, which resulted in approximately 1,000 seats having a restricted view. After opening the Club Deck, Ibrox had a capacity of 44,500. When a new playing surface was installed in 1992, Rangers were able to add a further 1,300 seats to the front of three stands by lowering the pitch slightly. The only standing area of the ground, the enclosure of the Main Stand, was seated in 1994 to comply with the Taylor Report and UEFA regulations. The multi-coloured seats were replaced in 1995 with uniform blue seats. A further 1,200 seats were added in this process by reconfiguring passageways, giving a total capacity of 47,998.

The two spaces between the Govan, Copland and Broomloan Stands were filled in with seats and Jumbotron screens. The ground was officially renamed Ibrox Stadium after renovations were completed in 1997, when Ibrox had a capacity of just over 50,000.

=== Capacity and developments ===
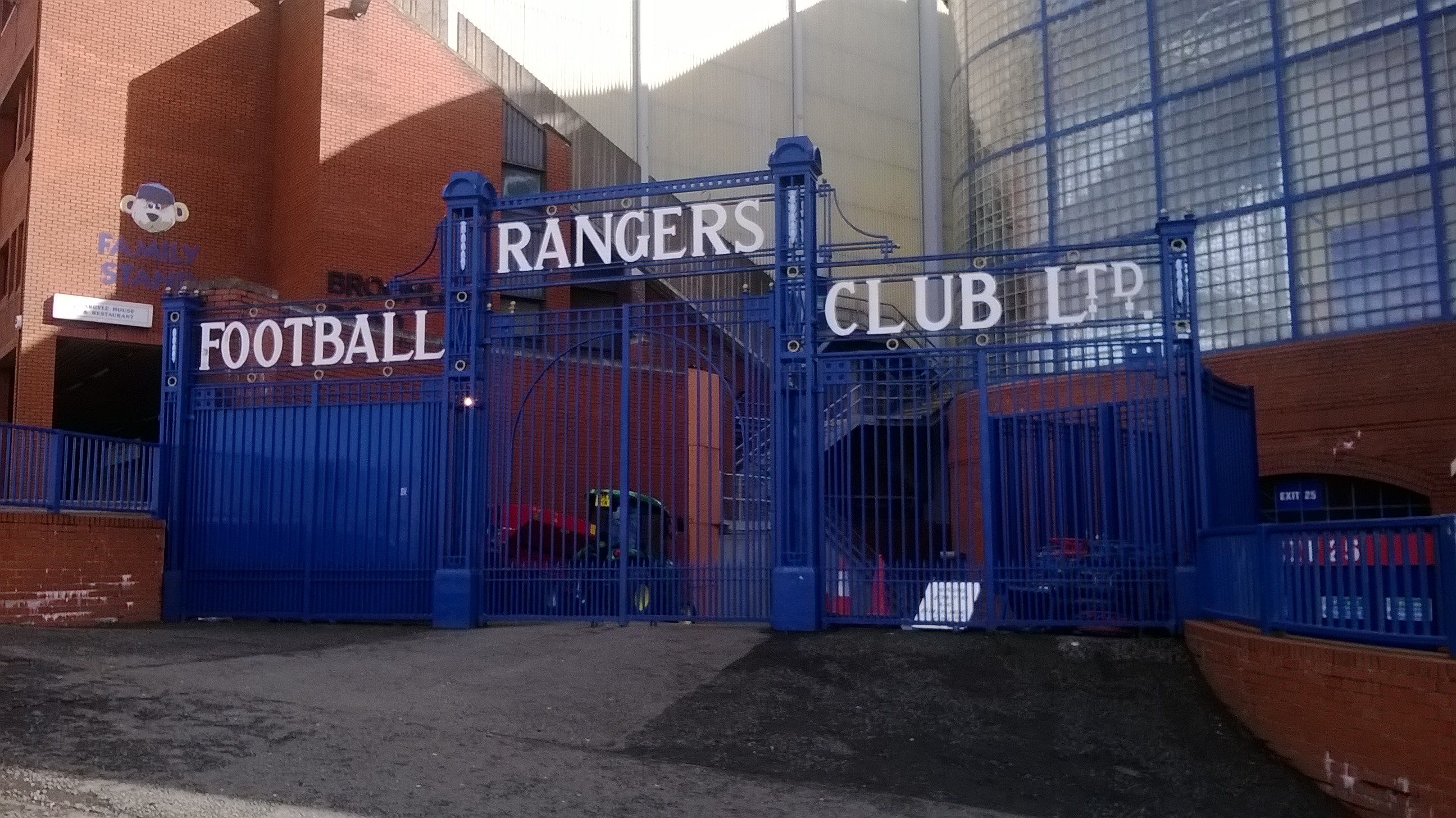
Gates to Ibrox stadium at Broomloan Stand.

Rangers have explored options to increase capacity at Ibrox. A report in the Daily Record in April 2007 claimed that Rangers were planning to increase capacity to 57,000, principally by removing the JumboTron screens and lowering the pitch to accommodate more seating. These plans were said to be dependent for finance upon improved performance by the team. In January 2008, Rangers announced that they were investigating three options to further develop Ibrox. One of the proposals would have resulted in a capacity of 70,000, by replacing three of the stands with a bowl-type structure. These plans were delayed in October 2008 due to the Great Recession.

Alongside changes to the stadium itself, Rangers have also sought to develop land around Ibrox. In partnership with the Las Vegas Sands corporation, the club received outline planning permission from Glasgow City Council for the development of land adjoining Ibrox as the home of a super casino. The casino was planned to be accompanied by a Rangers-themed leisure complex. Britain's Casino Advisory Panel reviewed bids from eight short-listed cities, including Glasgow, and in 2007 awarded the first licence to Manchester. There is no immediate prospect of the Ibrox proposal being resurrected, as Gordon Brown dropped the plans for super casinos soon after becoming Prime Minister. Rangers were given approval by Glasgow City Council in October 2008 to purchase land around Ibrox and redevelop the area with hotel and retail outlets. This scheme stalled, however, as regulations constrained what could be built in the area.

Three rows of seating were added to the front of the Govan Stand upper tier in 2006, linked to a new 'Bar 72' area, increasing the capacity to its present figure of 51,700. After opening the Bar 72 area in 2006, chief executive Martin Bain said that the scheme could be replicated in the Copland Stand. The Main Stand was renamed the Bill Struth Main Stand in September 2006, to commemorate the 50th anniversary of his death.

In January 2023, Rangers added 170 new seats in the Sandy Jardine Rear Stand by removing hospitality boxes in the former Argyle House Restaurant (rebranding it as the Blue Sky Lounge) adding three rows of seats to the rear of the stand and more disabled seating, taking the capacity up to 50,987.

In June 2023, a fan engagement meeting at New Edmiston House was told that Rangers were investigating various options to increase capacity. Beyond the previously announced plan to radically improve disabled facilities that would provide a net gain of 600 seats, Rangers costed both partial and complete infills of the corners between the Sandy Jardine stand and the Broomloan and Copland stands. The partial infills could deliver an increase of 1,300 seats per corner (2,600 total), with full infills delivering 3–4,000 seats per corner (6-8,000 total). In addition, there was an option to lower the playing surface to increase capacity by 4,500 seats, but this would involve the team having to relocate for matches until the work was completed.

In September 2024 the capacity of Ibrox Stadium increased to 51,700 with the addition of a further 600+ general access seats in the new Copland Rear cantilever and 30 disabled access seats being installed in the Copland Front.

=== Sale of Ibrox Stadium, 2012 ===
Rangers became insolvent in February 2012 and was unable to reach a company voluntary arrangement with its creditors, principally HM Revenue and Customs. Ibrox Stadium, along with the business and other assets of Rangers, was sold in June 2012 to a new company run by Charles Green.

=== Tributes and statues ===
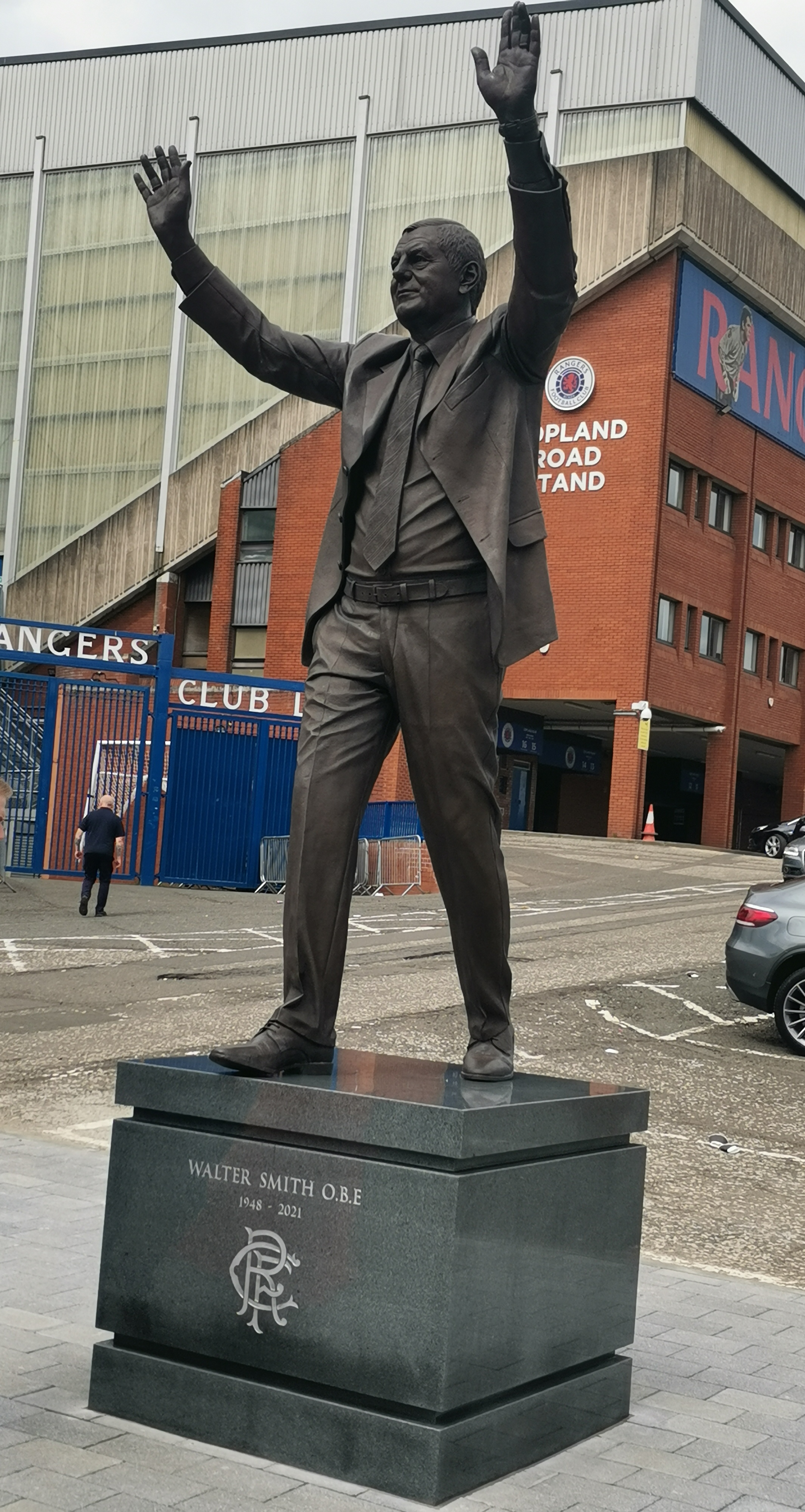
Statue of Walter Smith installed in 2024

On 16 July 2014, the club paid a tribute to Sandy Jardine by renaming the Govan Stand in his honour. Jardine won the league championship three times and the Scottish Cup five times with Rangers.

On 25 May 2024, a statue of former manager Walter Smith was unveiled in front of Ibrox's Copland Road Stand. Smith won ten league championships and five Scottish Cups with Rangers.

== Other uses ==
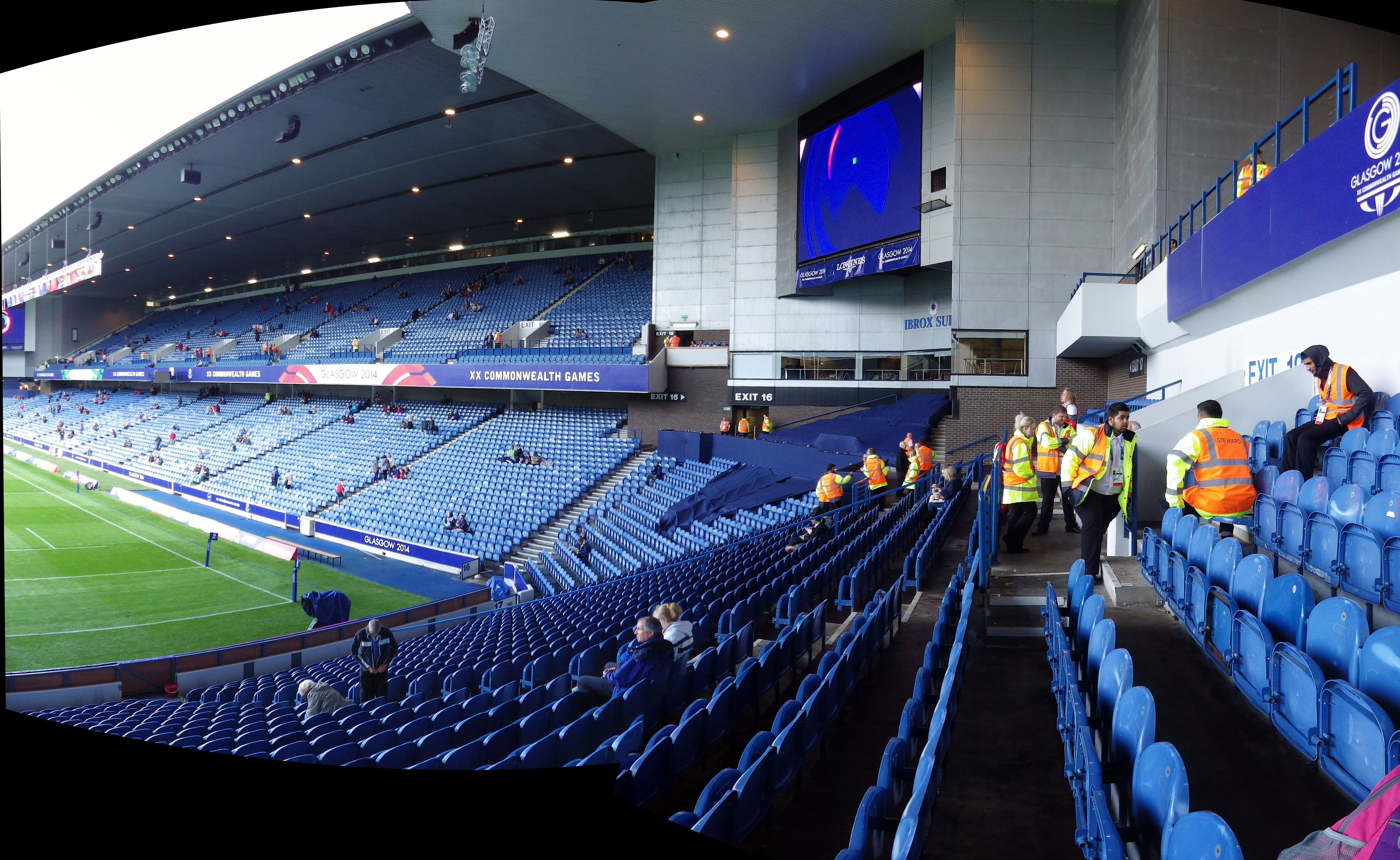
The interior of Ibrox, showing its "livery" for the Commonwealth Games rugby sevens

=== Football ===
Ibrox has been a home venue for the Scotland national football team 18 times, the third most of any ground. (Note: This includes the game abandoned due to the 1902 Ibrox disaster.) The first Ibrox Park (1887–99) hosted three internationals, giving an overall Ibrox total of 21. The ground most recently hosted a Scotland game in October 2014 (a UEFA Euro 2016 qualifier against Georgia, won 1–0) when Hampden Park was unavailable due to its temporary conversion to hold athletics in the 2014 Commonwealth Games. Ibrox hosted several internationals during the 1990s, particularly during two phases of redevelopment works at Hampden. Ibrox hosted four Scotland games in the first phase, starting with a 1994 World Cup qualifier against Portugal in October 1992. It was not a happy interlude for Scotland fans, however, as the team failed to qualify for the World Cup for the first time since 1970. Although the attendances at Ibrox were higher than at Hampden, some fans resented the fact that they were helping the finances of Rangers. and there were complaints about high ticket prices. During the second phase of work at Hampden, Scotland won an important 1998 World Cup qualifier against Sweden at Ibrox.

During these periods of redevelopment to Hampden, Ibrox also hosted the 1997 Scottish Cup Final, and the 1994 and 1997 Scottish League Cup Finals. Ibrox was on the approved UEFA list to host major European finals in the 1990s, but it lost out in a bid to host the 1996 UEFA Cup Winners' Cup Final because a convention threatened a shortage of hotel rooms in Glasgow. Ibrox continued to hold the top UEFA rating, but the Scottish Football Association instead proposed Hampden as a venue for European finals during the 2000s.

=== Non-football ===
King George V & Queen Mary visited Ibrox Park on 17 September 1917, to thank Glasgow and Clydeside for its efforts in the First World War. In the first ever public investiture in Scotland, and in front of 100,000, the King awarded medals to servicemen including three Victoria Crosses, 46 Military Medals and 33 Military Crosses. Four-fifths of the gathering were women - munitions workers, nurses and other war workers. For the 1938 Empire Exhibition being held in Bellahouston Park and which attracted over 13 million visitors, his son King George VI suggested the official opening ceremony be held in Ibrox Park, allowing 146,000 spectators to see the opening. His speech was broadcast live to the nation and throughout the Empire on the morning of 3 May 1938. This was used as source material by Colin Firth for his performance in The King's Speech.

Ibrox has been used for athletics competitions, Empire Games, and concerts, including performances by Simple Minds (1986), Frank Sinatra (1990), Rod Stewart (1995), Elton John (1998), Billy Joel (also 1998), Bon Jovi (1996, 2003 & 2007) and Harry Styles (2022).

In 1980, Ibrox hosted a world championship boxing match between Jim Watt and Howard Davis. Ibrox hosted the rugby sevens event at the 2014 Commonwealth Games, won by South Africa. There was a total attendance of 171,000 for the four sessions of play, which set a new record for a rugby sevens tournament.

The stadium hosted the 1983 Centenary Celebrations of The Boys' Brigade.

== Transport ==
The main railway stations in Glasgow, Central and Queen Street, are both approximately two miles from Ibrox. The Ibrox and Cessnock stations on the Glasgow Subway both serve Ibrox. It is also served by First Glasgow buses on Paisley Road West. Ibrox sits near to the M8 motorway, with junction 23 being the closest exit, but the roads around Ibrox become congested on matchdays. There was an Ibrox railway station, on the main line linking Glasgow and Paisley, which was closed in 1967 under the Beeching cuts.
