= Kinning Park =

Suburb of Glasgow, Scotland

Coordinates: 55.853003°N 4.284240°W

Kinning Park: Scots: Kinning Pairk
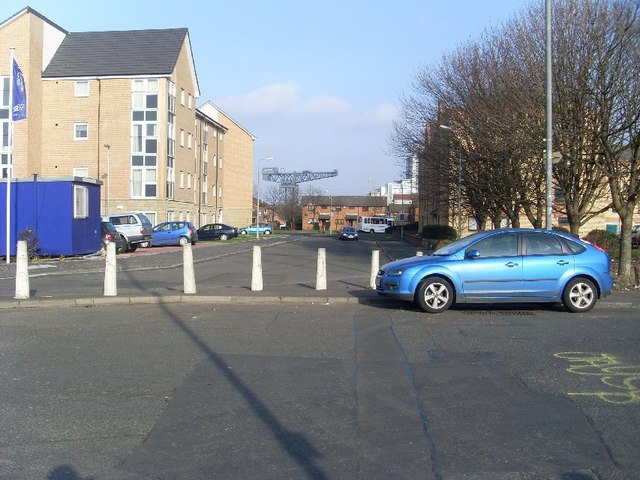
- Sussex Street, with the Finnieston Crane visible in the distance.

- Location within the Glasgow City council area Location within Scotland
- OS grid reference: NS571640
- Council area: Glasgow City
- Lieutenancy area: Glasgow
- Country: Scotland
- Sovereign state: United Kingdom
- Post town: GLASGOW
- Postcode district: G41
- Dialling code: 0141
- Police: Scotland
- Fire: Scottish
- Ambulance: Scottish
- UK Parliament: Glasgow Central
- Scottish Parliament: Glasgow Southside

Kinning Park is a southern suburb of Glasgow, Scotland. It was formerly a separate police burgh between 1871 and 1905 before being absorbed by the city. In 1897, it had a population of 14,326.

== Political history ==
Originally a separate police burgh founded in 1871, Kinning Park became part of Glasgow in 1905. Thereafter, it was a town council ward, situated between those covering Plantation to the west and Kingston to the east. It was the smallest such burgh in Scotland at just 108 acres (44 hectares). During its 34-year existence, the burgh had its own council, elections, coat of arms, provosts, town hall, council chambers, fire brigade, police force, and police court. Govan Burgh to the west survived even longer, from 1864 to 1912, before it too was annexed by the City of Glasgow.

The inaugural council in 1871 was one of the first examples of working class representation in Scotland with five "working men" candidates being elected to the 12 member council under the guidance of Andrew Boa, an activist who also served on the Glasgow Trades Council. This was well before the formation of the Scottish Labour Party in 1888 by Keir Hardie and Robert Bontine Cunninghame Graham.

During the area's time as an independent burgh, there were nine Provosts of Kinning Park:

- Alexander Abercrombie (1871–1874)
- Thomas Dick (1874–1877)
- William Muir (1877–1883)
- George Lindsay (1883–1890)
- James Whyte (1890–1893)
- John Campbell (1893–1896)
- Alexander Mitchell (1896–1899)
- William Gray (1899–1902)
- Thomas McMillan (1902–1905)

More recently, political activity in the district has received national publicity in relation to the Glasgow headquarters of the Scottish Socialist Party (SSP) in Stanley Street which occupies a site adjacent to the former Kinning Park Burgh Chambers. This SSP building was the scene of the Executive Committee Emergency Meeting on 9 November 2004, which led to later disagreement between prominent Scottish politician Tommy Sheridan and many of his committee colleagues. The minutes of the meeting were disputed and they became a key point of discussion in the defamation case which Sheridan brought against the News of the World newspaper in 2006.

== Etymology ==
A map by Robert Ogilvy in 1741 of the estate of Sir John Maxwell of Pollok shows a field called "The Park" just to the west of the building "Kinnen House" (later Kinning House) and immediately south of what today is Paisley Road Toll, but up to the 19th century was called Parkhouse Toll. Hence, this proximity of "The Park" and "Kinning House" is likely to be the origin of the name Kinning Park as the area developed. "Kinning" could be linked to the Scots word "kinnen" ("cunig", "cuning", "cunyg" or "coney") meaning a rabbit. This would be consistent the naming of the neighbouring area of Ibrox after the Gaelic "Àth Bruic" meaning "badger ford".

In nearby Pollokshields, there was also once a 1/2-mile-long (800-metre) grassy valley called "The Cunyan", which existed immediately south of Fleurs Avenue and the railway line, until it was built over as part of the route of the M77 motorway in the mid-1970s.

The same Robert Ogilvy map of 1741 also shows a field called the "Plantation" in the area which later became known as Plantation. This is likely to be the origin of the Plantation name. There is a story that a later owner of the area, a Mr Robertson, named the area Plantation in the 1780s because he also owned property in the West Indies. However, the Ogilvy map suggests that the area was known as Plantation well before Mr Robertson's period.

== Economic development ==
From 1850, Kinning Park grew from a rural village to a busy centre mainly inhabited by artisans and labourers. Its principal industries were engineering, bread and biscuit baking, soap-making and paint-making.

Andrew Boa was also involved in the formation of Kinning Park Co-Operative Society in 1871 which flourished up until 1952, opening retail and manufacturing premises in Kinning Park and many other neighbouring districts south of the Clyde.

Kinning Park is now a district in Glasgow situated on the south bank of the Clyde about one mile (1.5 kilometres) west of the city centre between Kingston and Ibrox/Govan. It is served by Kinning Park subway station, which is the closest to the surface of all the stations on the 15 station circle. Nowadays, the district is home to many small industrial units, and until 2009 was home to the Scottish versions of News International's UK newspaper titles. The headquarters of BBC Scotland and Scottish Television were relocated to Pacific Quay over a period between 2004 and 2008, just to the west of the boundary of the old burgh.

== Notable buildings ==
Our Lady and St Margaret's Primary School is a former primary school in Stanley Street. The school first opened on the site in 1875 at the instigation of the local priest Canon Donald Mackintosh, later an Assistant Archbishop of Glasgow. The second and surviving building was designed by the architects Bruce & Hay, opened in 1910, and closed in 1996–97. It is a Category C(s) listed building which is considered a good example of a school building on a palazzo scale. There is an earlier presbytery (architect Peter Paul Pugin, opened 1882) adjacent to the school building. There was also a playground for the school children in a walled area on the roof of the school. This meant that tennis balls used in games were sometimes lost over the side wall into the street. The school was converted into offices during 2006–2010 in three phases of building and letting by Loft Office Limited under the development name Stanley Street Schoolhouse.

A tenement on the north side of MacLellan Street with 49 closes (common stairway entrance) had a claim to being the longest unbroken such building in the city, and possibly the UK. Everything on that north side was demolished to make way for the motorway, and though the street still exists within an industrial estate, it has been isolated from the rest of the area by the road. The estate replaced the Clutha Works, an extensive iron foundry operated by P&W MacLennan (1811 to 1979), an engineering firm involved in the construction of bridges across the world, and which gave the street its name.

Donald Bruce and Edward Hay were partners in an architectural firm based in West George Street. Bruce was born in Caithness and from 1881 to 1905 he was the surveyor to Kinning Park Burgh Council. Bruce and Hay designed a number of other distinctive buildings in the Kinning Park area including: Kinning Park Library (demolished 1978); the Ogg Brothers' store at Paisley Road Toll (now often called the "Angel Building" due to the prominent angel figure on the top); Rutland House at 45 Govan Road topped with a large eastern-style onion-dome (demolished 1971); United and Co-Operative Bakery, 12 McNeil Street (demolished late 1970s); Kinning Park Co-Operative Society stables at the corner of Stanley Street and Vermont Street featuring a distinctive red and white brick facade (demolished 1970s); and the largest of the Co-Operative Wholesale Society Buildings at Kingston (south side of Morrison Street beside M8).

=== Kinning Park Complex ===
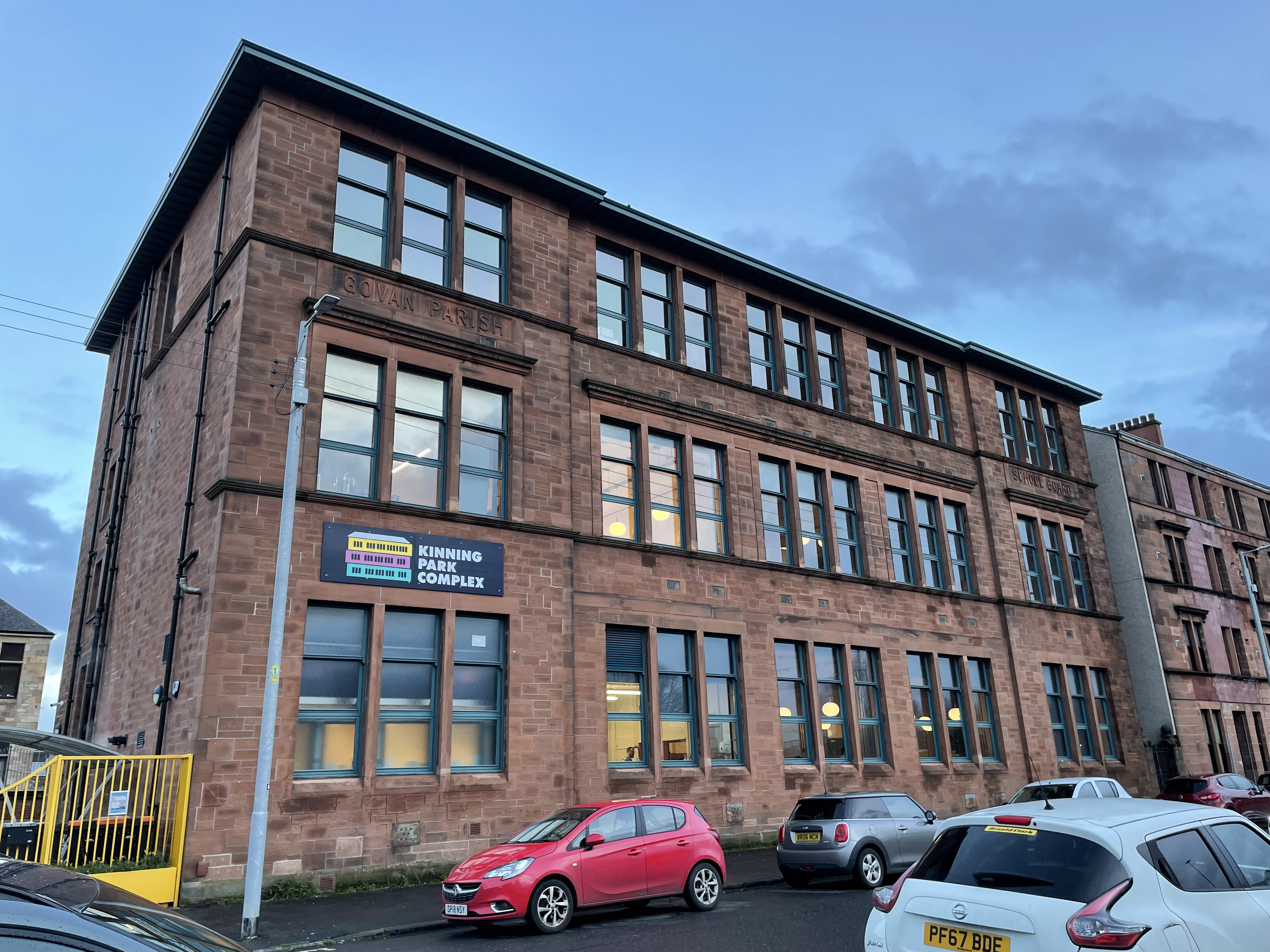
Exterior of Kinning Park Complex

The Kinning Park Complex is an independent multi-use community space in the neighbourhood, providing different kinds of activity to bring people together and create a sense of community. Originally built for use as a primary school in 1910, the building was converted into the Kinning Park Neighbourhood Centre in 1976. When it was closed by the local council in 1996 after falling into disrepair, a group staged a sit-in for 55 days at the centre and eventually reached an agreement with the council to lease the building, keeping the centre open under the new management of a community organisation, Kinning Park Complex.

== Sport ==
It also incorporates some of the most football-obsessed public houses in Glasgow, almost all of them favouring the nearby Rangers. Rangers once played at the Kinning Park ground in West Scotland Street from 1876 to 1887 after which they moved to the first Ibrox. The ground was first used in 1849 by Clydesdale Cricket Club who moved to their current Titwood ground in 1876. The cricketers played cricket in summer and the new sport of football in winter. Clydesdale of Kinning Park contested the very first Scottish Cup Final in 1874 against Queens Park but lost 2–0 at the first Hampden Park. The 1881 Scottish Cup Final and replay, in which Queen's Park beat Dumbarton, were played at the Kinning Park football ground. The site of the ground is now covered by the eastbound carriageway of the M8 motorway just to the south of the present Lambhill Quadrant.

== M8 motorway ==
The route of the M8 motorway through Kinning Park was first proposed in Glasgow Corporation's "Bruce Plan" in 1945. The eventual building of the motorway during 1970-76 demolished a large part of the old district and displaced many residents to other areas of Glasgow or to new towns further afield.

== Notable people ==
The singer Mary Lee was born in 1921 in a Kinning Park tenement flat.

The rock singer Alex Harvey (born 1935) of The Sensational Alex Harvey Band grew up in Durham Street in Kinning Park. His younger brother Les Harvey was also a musician, who formed a band called the Kinning Park Ramblers with Maggie Bell. They later became successful as Stone the Crows. Les died aged only 27 in a tragic electrocution accident after touching an ungrounded, live microphone while on stage with Stone the Crows in Swansea on 3 May 1972.

== Gallery ==
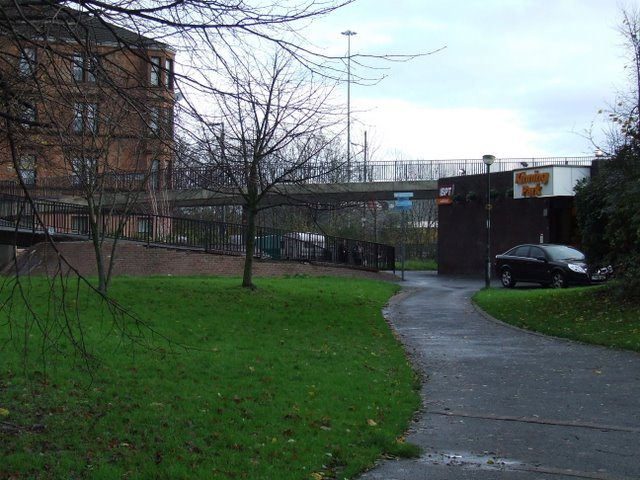
Kinning Park Subway Station

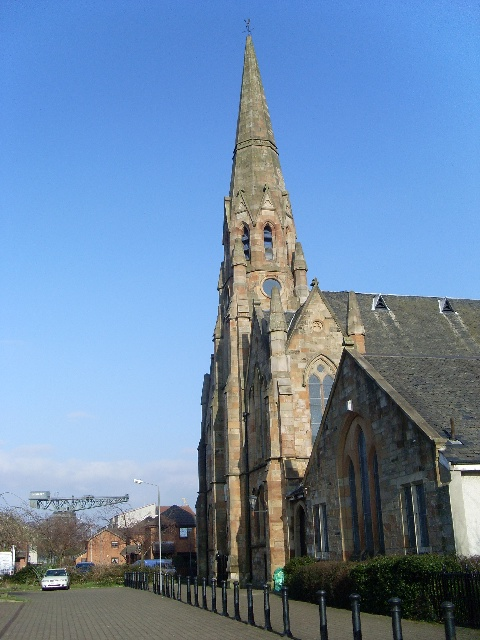
Kinning Park Parish Church
