= Kinning Park subway station =

Glasgow subway station

Kinning Park Pàirc Kinning
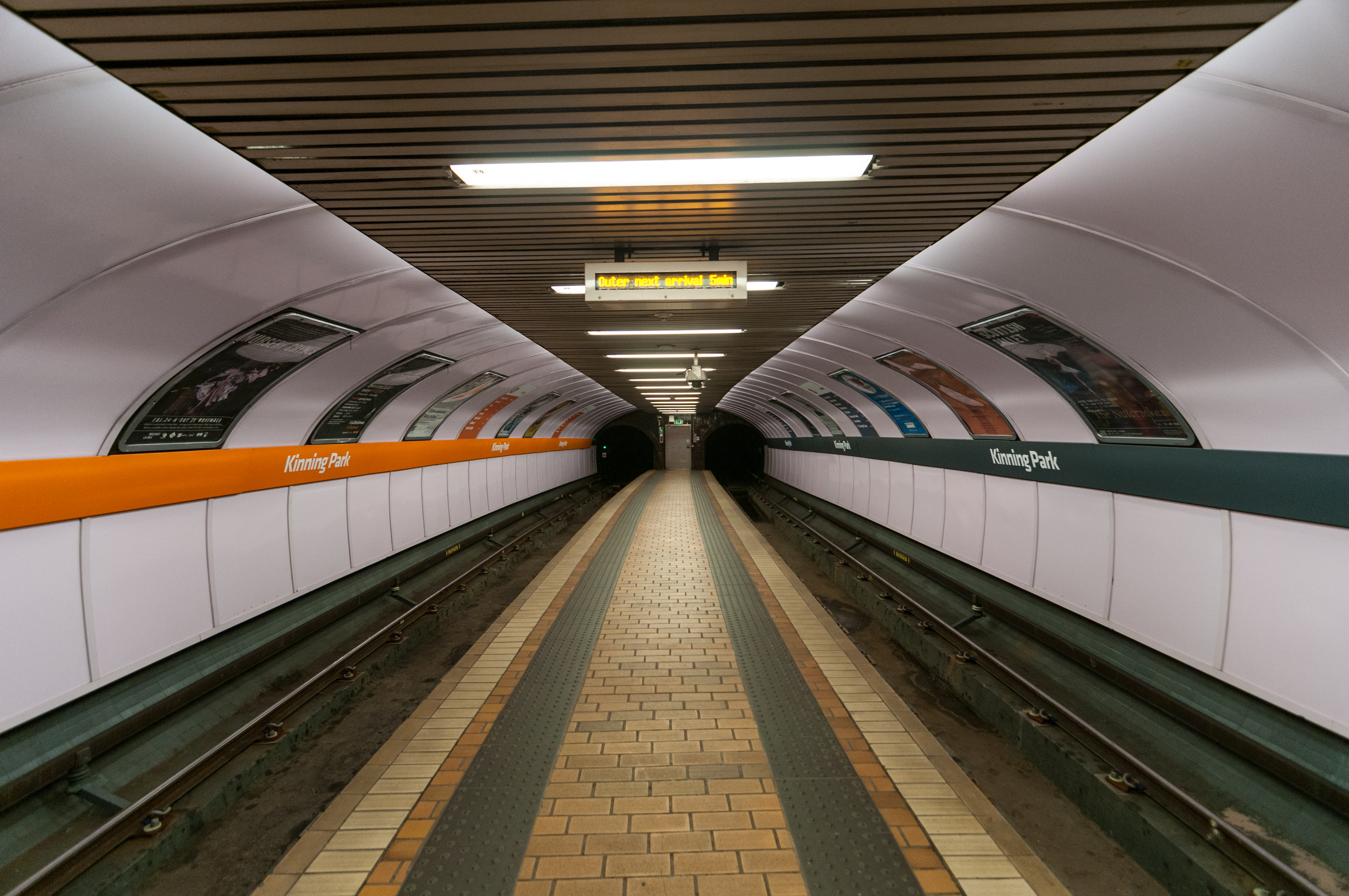

General information
- Location: Kinning Park, Glasgow; Scotland
- Coordinates: 55°51′03″N 4°17′17″W
- Operator: SPT
- Transit authority: SPT
- Platforms: 2

Construction
- Structure type: underground
- Accessible: No

Other information
- Fare zone: 1

History
- Opened: 14 December 1896
- Rebuilt: 16 April 1980; 46 years ago

Passengers
- 2018: 0.655 million annually

Services
Preceding station	SPT	Following station
Shields Road anticlockwise / inner circle	Glasgow Subway	Cessnock clockwise / outer circle
Location

Kinning Park subway station (Scottish Gaelic: Pàirc Kinning) serves Kinning Park and Kinning Park Industrial Estate in Glasgow, Scotland. A bridge is currently being built across the M8 beside the station but currently passengers must cross a bridge at the far side of Plantation Park to get across the motorway.

It was opened in 1896 and comprehensively modernised in 1977–1980. The station retains its original island platform configuration.

Kinning Park station is the shallowest in the Subway system.

The station is lightly used and recorded only 240,000 boardings in the 12 months ending March 2005.

New ticket barriers came into operation on 10 July 2013.

== Past passenger numbers ==
- 2004/05: 0.240 million annually
- 2011/12: 0.237 million annually

== Gallery ==
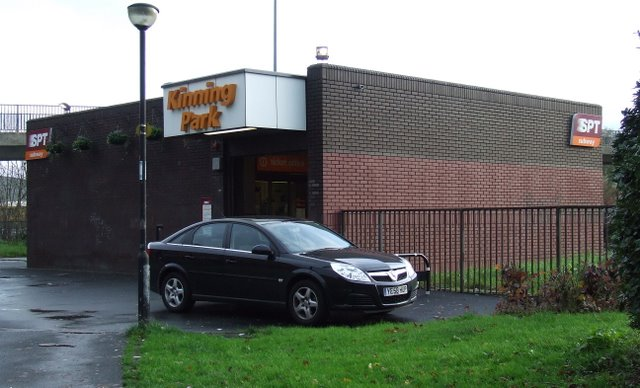
Station exterior prior to refurbishment

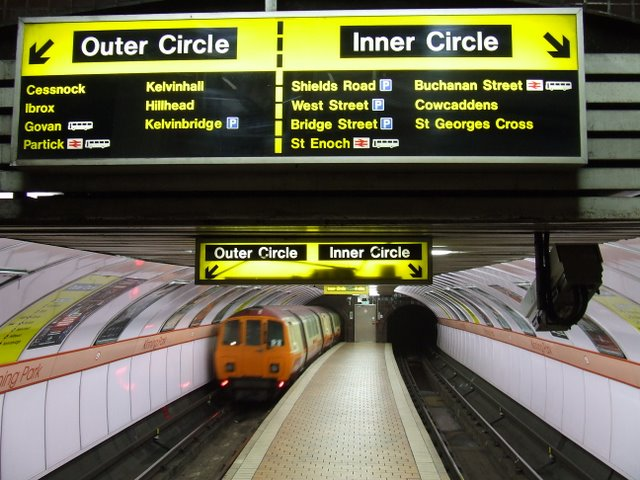
Platforms

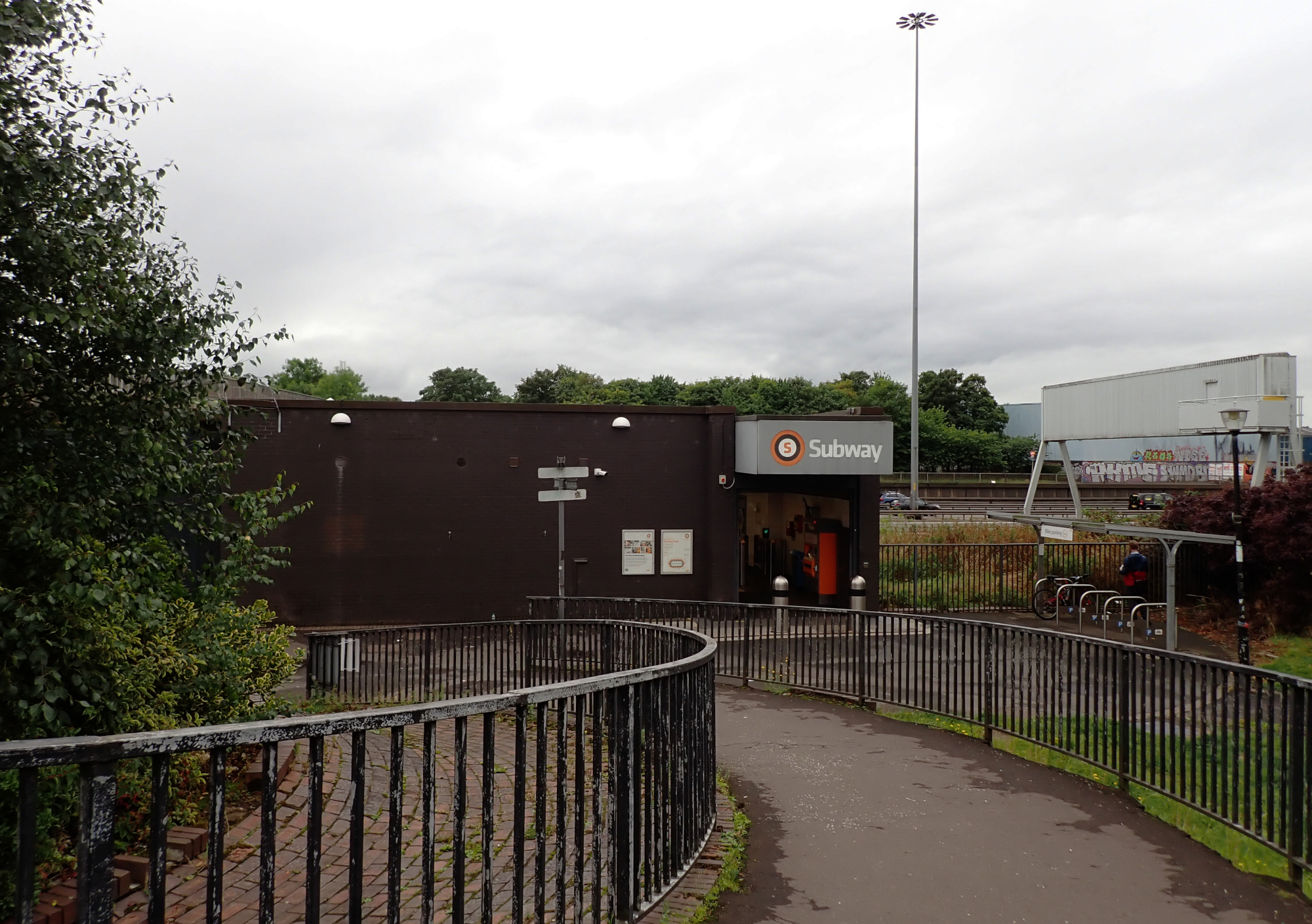
Station exterior
