= Walmer Crescent =

Coordinates: 55.85206°N 4.29559°W

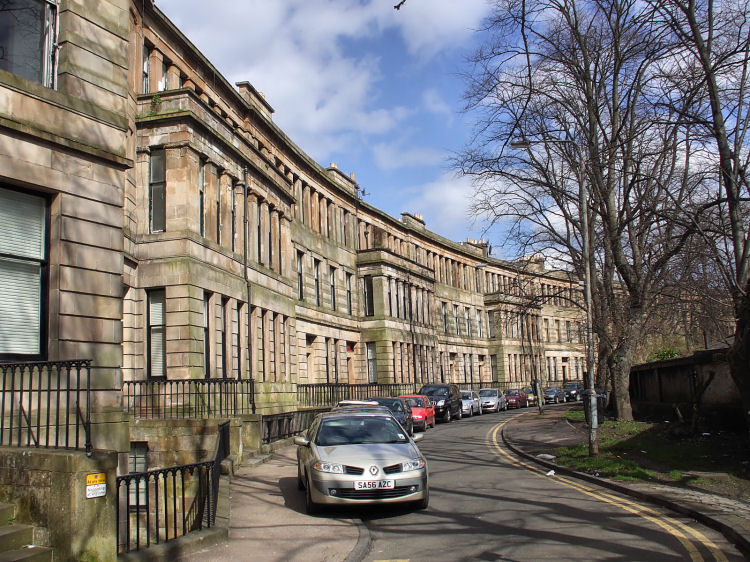
- Interactive map of the Walmer Crescent area

General information
- Architectural style: Greek Revival
- Location: Glasgow, Scotland
- Construction started: 1857
- Completed: 1862

Technical details
- Structural system: masonry

Design and construction
- Architect: Alexander Thomson

Walmer Crescent, situated in Cessnock, Glasgow, Scotland, consists of a curved row of spacious tenement flats and houses, designed by the architect Alexander Thomson and built between 1857 and 1862.

The houses of the crescent are protected as a category A listed building. The surrounding area was designated as Walmer Crescent Conservation Area on 16 July 1975.

Externally the block is a seamless whole, but it is made up of seven individual buildings (including the one in Cessnock Street). The tenement has three floors over a raised basement, with a flight of steps up to the front doors. Every individual building has three doors. A center door leads to the close and staircase. The two outer doors are for the main door flats which originally had two floors, the ground floor and basement. Around the basement areas there are cast iron railings with arcaded detailing.

The most prominent features of the facade are the twinned square bay windows in Walmer Crescent proper, rising from the basement past the first floor, providing a balcony for the top floor flats. The main elevation of the building curves gently around the crescent.

The terminal pavilion at the western end is angular; in contrast, the one between the Walmer Crescent and Cessnock Street sections has a curved mock-turret.

There is a row of single story shops where the front gardens used to be. The shops were built in 1907/08 and originally had decorative balustrading running along their length.

The Alexander 'Greek' Thomson Society is based at number 7 Walmer Crescent. Cessnock station on the Glasgow Subway, is located beneath the tenement and opened in 1896.

== See also ==
- List of Category A listed buildings in Glasgow
