= 1971 Ibrox disaster =

Crowd crush at a Glasgow football game

Ibrox Disaster, 1971
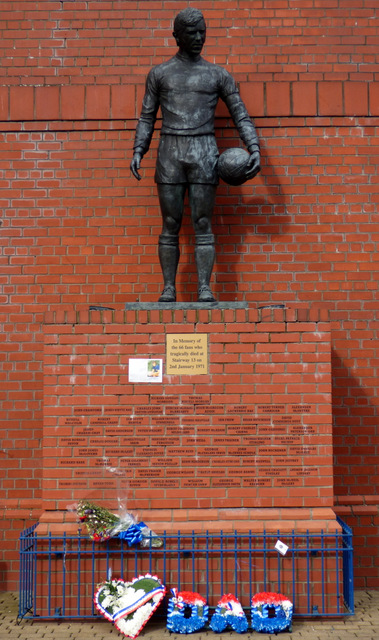
- A memorial to those who died in the disaster, including a statue of then-captain John Greig, unveiled in January 2001
- Date: 2 January 1971
- Location: Ibrox Park, Glasgow, Scotland; 55°51′13″N 04°18′25″W
- Deaths: 66
- Injuries: > 200

The 1971 Ibrox disaster, also known as the Second Ibrox Disaster, was a crush among the crowd at an Old Firm football game (Rangers v Celtic), which led to 66 deaths and more than 200 injuries. It happened on 2 January 1971 on an exit stairway at Ibrox Park (now Ibrox Stadium) in Glasgow, Scotland. It was the worst football disaster in Britain until the Hillsborough disaster in Sheffield, England, in 1989.

The stadium's owner, Rangers FC, was later ruled to be at fault in a sheriff's judgement on one of the deaths. Rangers did not dispute this ruling and was sued for damages in 60 other cases brought by relatives of the dead.

== Background ==
The first disaster at Ibrox occurred during a 1902 home international match between Scotland and England. The rear of the wooden West Tribune Stand collapsed due to heavy rainfall the previous night, causing 25 deaths and more than 500 injuries.

Ibrox Park in 1910, with the Copland Road exit at the far corner of the stadium. An equivalent staircase can be seen descending the nearest corner.

During 1963, concerns were raised about the safety of the stairway adjacent to passageway 13, colloquially known as Stairway 13, the exit closest to Copland Road subway station. It was documented that the stairs provided very little freedom of movement due to crowd pressure; many were lifted off their feet by the crowd and had no choice in which lane they were going to use, or at what pace.

On 16 September 1961, two people were killed in a crush on the stairway. In 1967, eight spectators were injured when leaving the stadium. In 1969, 26 were injured in an accident on Stairway 13 during egress. No measures were taken to consult a professional firm to discuss the potential dangers from crowds on Stairway 13 following these events. Subsequent to the 1961 accident, Rangers had by then spent a total of £150,000 (equivalent to £2,200,000 in 2025) on improvements to Ibrox, a significant sum of money for the time.

== Events ==
The disaster occurred on Saturday, 2 January 1971, when 66 people were killed in a crush as supporters tried to leave the stadium. The match was an Old Firm game (Rangers v Celtic) and was attended by more than 80,000 fans. In the 90th minute, Celtic took a 1–0 lead through Jimmy Johnstone, but in the final moments of the match, Colin Stein scored an equaliser for Rangers. As thousands of spectators were leaving the ground by Stairway 13, it appears that someone may have fallen, causing a massive chain reaction pile-up of people.

Initially, there was speculation that some fans left the ground slightly early when Celtic scored, but then turned back when they heard the crowd cheering when Stein scored the equaliser, colliding with fans leaving the ground when the match ended. The official inquiry into the disaster indicated that there was no truth in this hypothesis, however, as all the spectators were heading in the same direction at the time of the incident.

Most of the deaths were caused by compressive asphyxia, with bodies being stacked up to six feet (1.8 m) deep in the area. More than 200 other fans were injured.

Kenny Dalglish, then a Celtic player, was in the stands when the tragedy occurred. Dalglish was also present at the Heysel and Hillsborough disasters, in 1985 and 1989 respectively, with Liverpool.

== Victims ==
Sixty-six people died on the day at the stadium as a result of injuries incurred during the disaster. Of those who died, all were aged under 50; 61 were under 40, 49 were under 30, 33 were under 20 and one was aged under 10. The loss included many children, five of whom, Peter Easton, Martin Paton, Mason Phillips, Brian Todd and Douglas Morrison, were schoolmates from the same town of Markinch in Fife. The loss also included 31 teenagers, including the only female victim, 18-year-old Margaret Ferguson of Maddiston, Stirlingshire. The youngest child to die was 9-year-old Nigel Pickup of Liverpool.

More than 200 people were reported to have suffered injuries.

Age range	Men	Women	Total
0–9	1	0	1
10–19	31	1	32
20–29	16	0	16
30–39	12	0	12
40–49	5	0	5
Totals	65	1	66

== Aftermath ==
The disaster spurred the UK government to look into safety at sports grounds. In February 1971, Scottish judge Lord Wheatley was asked to conduct an inquiry. His findings, published in May 1972, formed the basis for the Guide to Safety at Sports Grounds (Green Guide), first published in 1973.

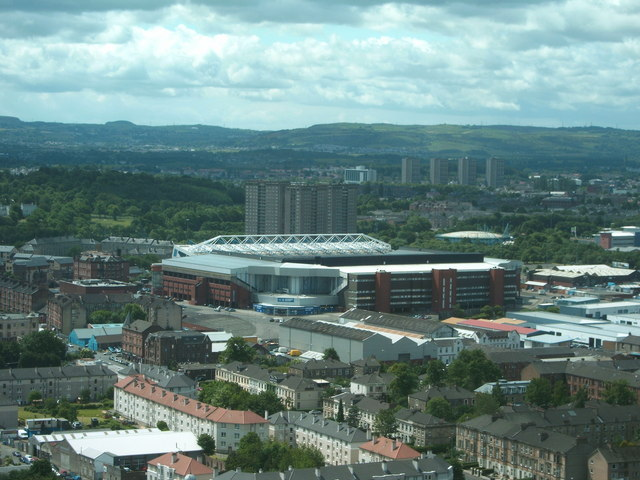
Exterior view of all-seater Ibrox Stadium, with Stairway 13 corner in the foreground (2008)

The 1971 disaster led to a huge redevelopment of Ibrox Park, spearheaded by the then-manager Willie Waddell, who visited Borussia Dortmund's Westfalenstadion for inspiration. After three years' reconstruction work, with three sides of the ground being replaced by modern all-seater stands, Ibrox Park was converted to a 44,000-capacity stadium by 1981. Further work in the 1990s increased the stadium capacity to 50,000, and Ibrox was subsequently awarded UEFA five-star status.

The Scottish folk singer-songwriter Matt McGinn wrote a song called "The Ibrox Disaster" as a tribute to the people who died in the tragic event.

== Investigation ==
A fatal accident inquiry, held in Glasgow, opened on 15 February 1971. It lasted seven days, although the jury of four men and three women had been instructed not to make recommendations on safety precautions at football grounds, because an inquiry led by Lord Wheatley would be examining this.

=== Litigation ===
Sheriff James Irvine Smith, in his statement after a civil damages trial raised at Glasgow Sheriff Court in May 1974 by the widow of one of the Ibrox victims, ruled: "The said accident was due to the fault and negligence of the defenders, Rangers F.C.". Smith found Rangers guilty on four counts in the case of the death of Charles Dougan, a 31-year-old boilermaker from Clydebank who died, as did 56 others, from traumatic asphyxia.

After hearing of the series of accidents on Stairway 13 including September 1961 when there were 70 people injured and two deaths, September 1967 when eleven people were taken to hospital, and January 1969 when 29 people were injured, Sheriff Irvine Smith stated,

So far as the evidence is concerned, the Board never so much as considered that it ought to apply its mind to the question of safety on that particular stairway [...] and would appear – I put it no higher – to have proceeded on the view that if the problem was ignored long enough it would eventually go away [...] Indeed it goes further than this because certain of their actions can only be interpreted as a deliberate and apparently successful attempt to deceive others that they were doing something, when in fact they were doing nothing.

— Sheriff Irvine Smith, damages statement.

In the case of Charles Dougan and a further 60 cases brought by relatives of the dead, Rangers did not dispute the findings of Sheriff Irvine Smith and instead merely disputed the calculation of the damages, as can be seen from the appeal judgement of the Sheriff Principal. In his book, Irvine Smith states that almost 40 years after his decision, he was viewed with disapproval by some Rangers-supporting friends, who accused him of "disloyalty".

== Legacy ==
For some years after the 1971 disaster, there was only a small plaque at the corner of the ground where it happened. However, in 1995, Rangers announced plans to commemorate the 66 fans killed in the disaster. On 2 January 2001, the 30th anniversary of the tragedy, a larger monument was unveiled at the corner of the Bill Struth Main Stand and the Copland Road Stand. The monument contains blue plaques displaying the names of each person killed in all three incidents. A statue of John Greig, the Rangers captain at the time of the 1971 disaster, stands on top of the monument.

In 2011, the 40th anniversary of the disaster was commemorated before the Old Firm game on 2 January 2011 when a one-minute silence was observed before the game. Both teams wore black armbands as a sign of respect and were led out by John Greig and Billy McNeill, the respective club captains at the time of the disaster (although McNeill had not played due to injury).

== See also ==
- 1902 Ibrox disaster
- Burnden Park disaster
- Luzhniki disaster – in Moscow on 20 October 1982
- Bradford City stadium fire
- Hillsborough disaster
- List of disasters of the United Kingdom and preceding states
- Heysel Stadium disaster
