= Ibrox subway station =

Glasgow subway station

Ibrox
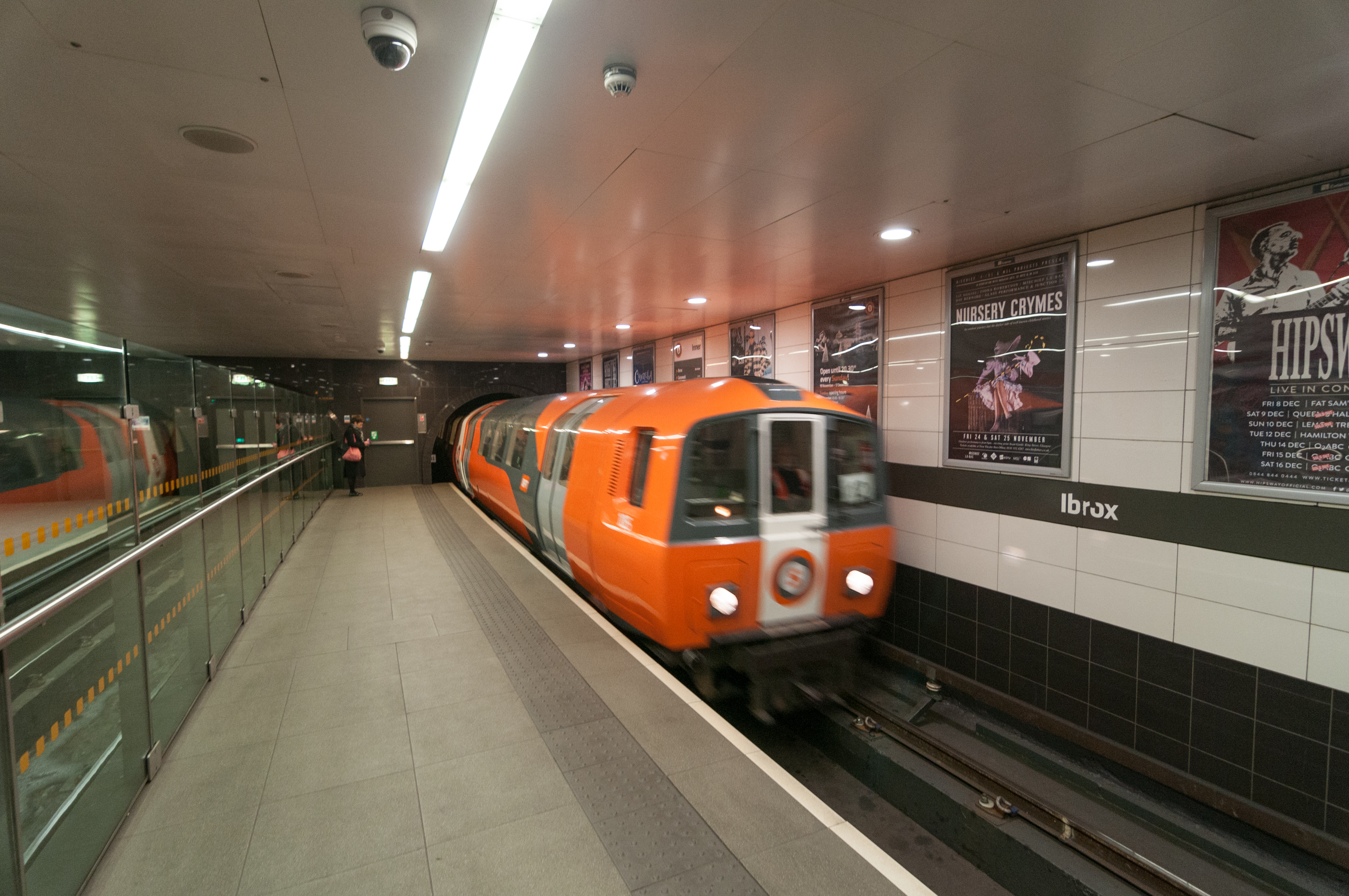

General information
- Location: Ibrox, Glasgow; Scotland
- Coordinates: 55°51′16″N 4°18′19″W
- Operator: SPT
- Transit authority: SPT
- Platforms: 2

Construction
- Structure type: underground
- Accessible: No

Other information
- Fare zone: 1

History
- Opened: 14 December 1896
- Rebuilt: 16 April 1980; 46 years ago
- Former names: Copland Road (1896–1977)

Passengers
- 2018: 1.098 million annually

Services
Preceding station	SPT	Following station
Cessnock anticlockwise / inner circle	Glasgow Subway	Govan clockwise / outer circle
Location

Ibrox subway station is a station on the Glasgow Subway, serving the Ibrox area of the city. The station was known as Copland Road until 1977. Its surface buildings were replaced during the Subway's modernisation programme, with the main entrance still located on Copland Road. The station now has a side platform arrangement for boarding trains.

Particularly of note is the nearby Ibrox Stadium, home of Rangers F.C. The station is extremely busy on match days, with an additional entrance on Woodville Street opening to accommodate the vastly increased volume of passenger traffic. However, the station is generally quiet at other times and records around 540,000 boardings per year.

Also nearby is Glasgow Science Centre, although SPT suggests that Cessnock station is the best alighting point for the Science Centre, because it is closer.

== Past passenger numbers ==
- 2004/05: 0.520 million annually
- 2011/12: 0.510 million annually
