= Ibrox, Glasgow =

Area of Glasgow, Scotland

Coordinates: 55.852°N 4.308°W

Ibrox
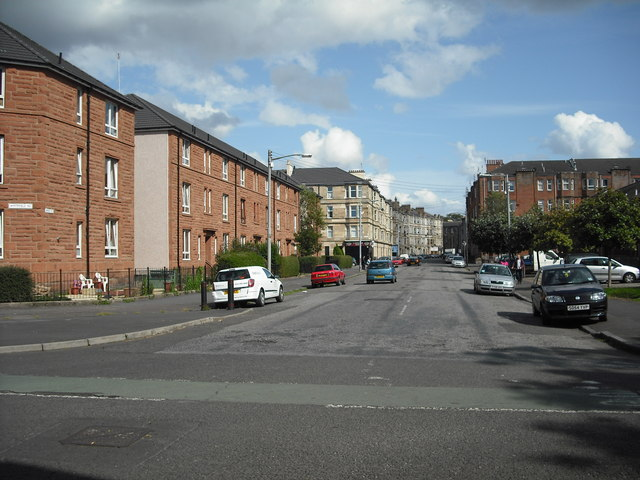
- Ibrox Street

- Location within Glasgow
- OS grid reference: NS5564
- Council area: Glasgow City Council
- Lieutenancy area: Glasgow
- Country: Scotland
- Sovereign state: United Kingdom
- Post town: GLASGOW
- Postcode district: G51
- Dialling code: 0141
- Police: Scotland
- Fire: Scottish
- Ambulance: Scottish
- UK Parliament: Glasgow South West
- Scottish Parliament: Glasgow Southside

Ibrox (/ˈaɪbrɒks/) is an area of Glasgow, Scotland. It is situated south of the River Clyde and is part of the former burgh of Govan. The origin of the name Ibrox is unclear. It is often said to come from the Gaelic àth bruic, meaning "badger ford", It could also be from the name from a round castle in Scots known as a brouch, ultimately however it is just named after the street it lies on.

It is within walking distance of the Pacific Quay Media Park, housing BBC Scotland, STV and other production companies along with the Glasgow Science Centre. The opening of the Clyde Arc provides a road connection to the other side of the River Clyde. Ibrox is served by Ibrox subway station of the Glasgow Subway system.

The home of football club Rangers F.C. is located at Ibrox Stadium.

Ibrox Primary School is a primary school located on Edmiston Drive, the main road through Ibrox, directly across from Ibrox Stadium. The building was designed by Bruce and Hay and was opened in 1906. The school was originally known as Ibrox Board School, was built for the Govan Parish School Board.

Ibrox is home to an original artwork by South African artist Faith47. Located on Copland Road opposite the entrance to Fairley Street, the piece was completed during the preparations for the 2014 Commonwealth Games.

== Gallery ==
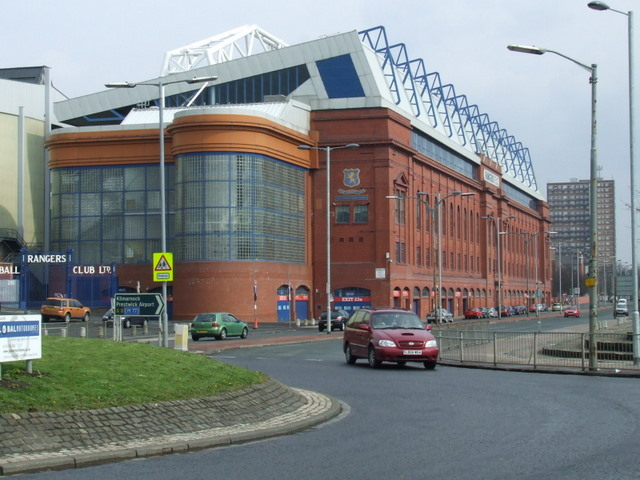
Ibrox Stadium

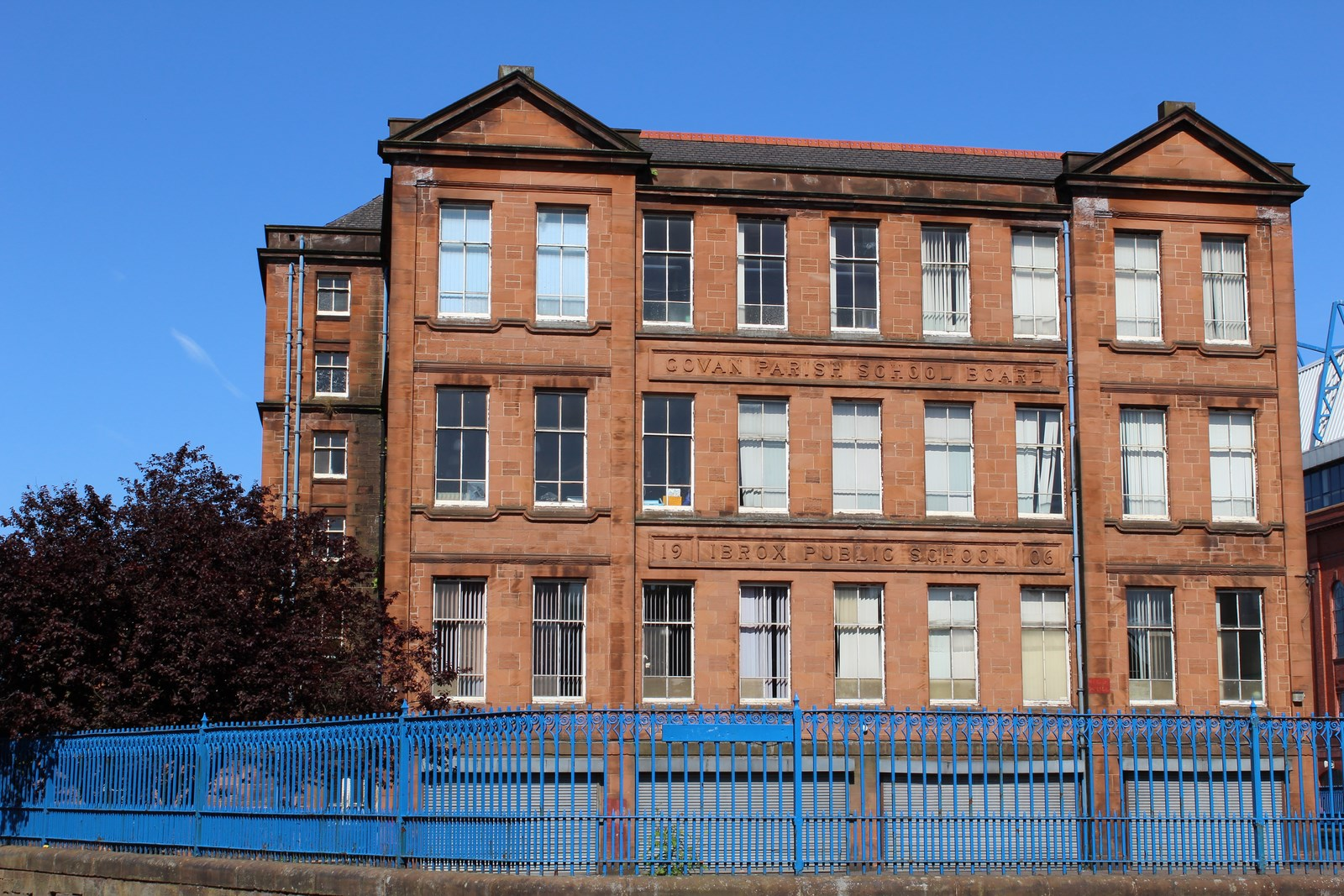
Ibrox Primary School in 2013

== See also ==
- Glasgow tower blocks
