= List of Carnegie libraries in Europe =

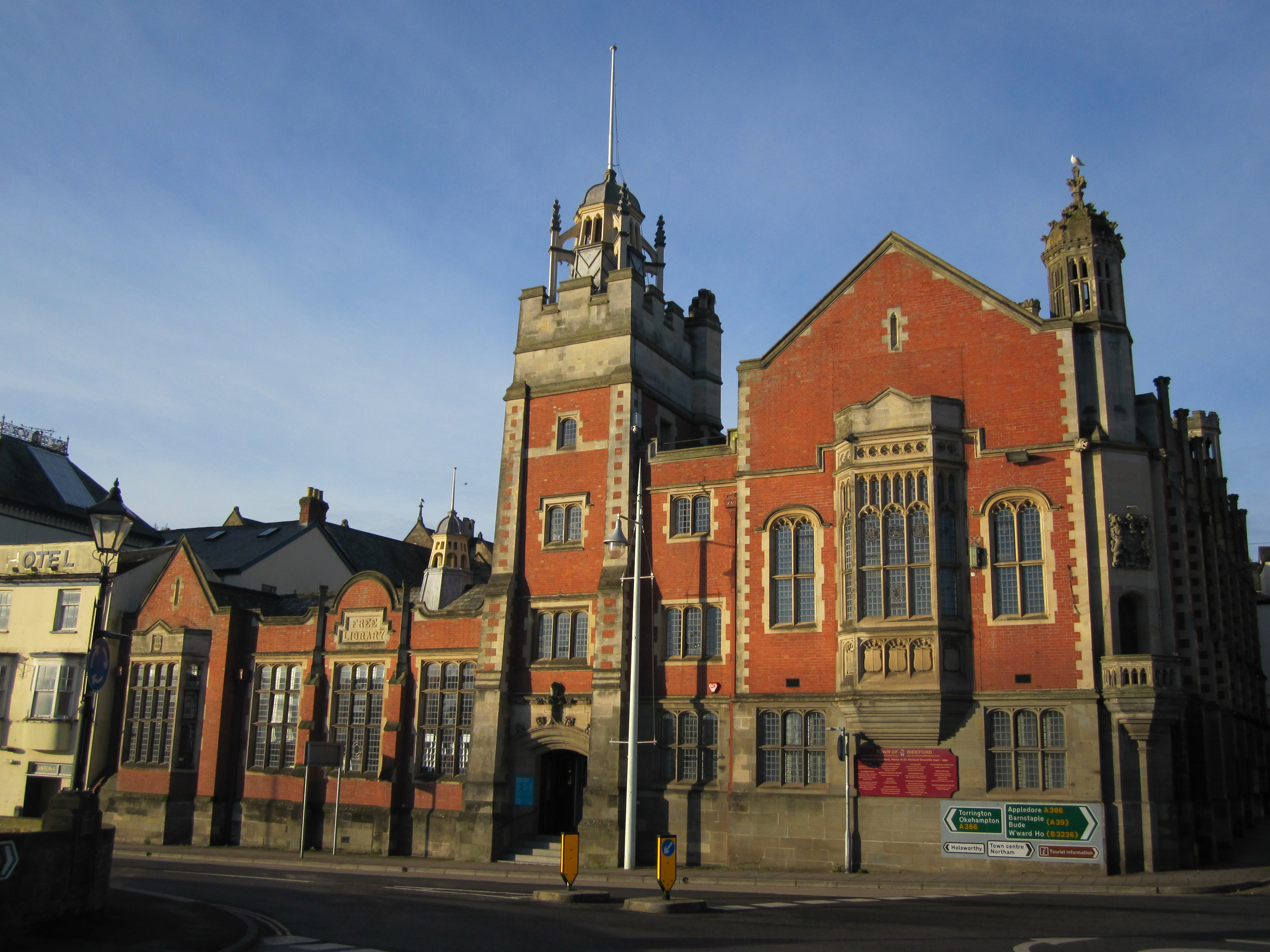
Bideford Library, Devon, England, built 1905

This is an incomplete list of Carnegie libraries in Europe.

== Belgium ==
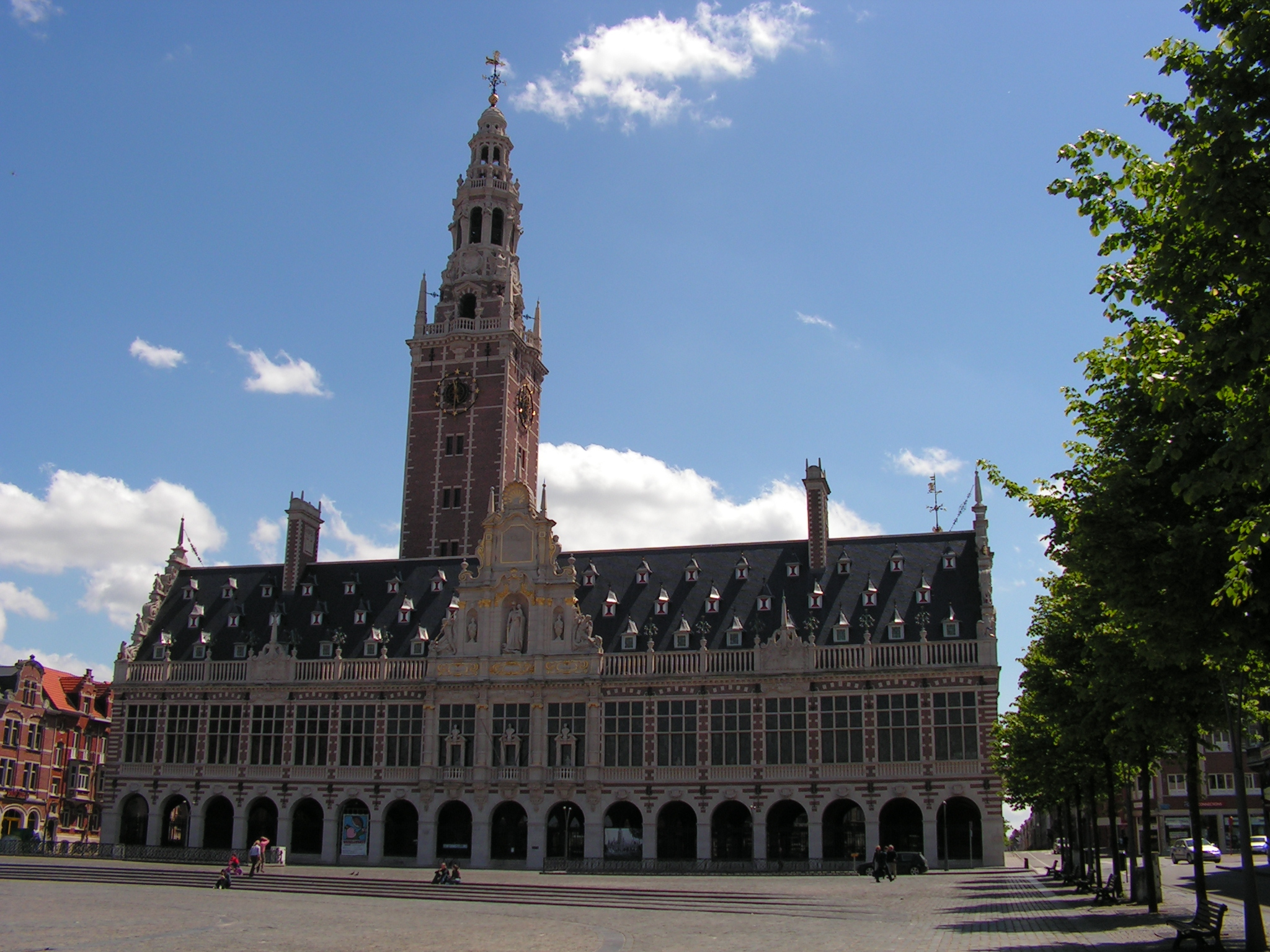
The University Library, Leuven, Belgium

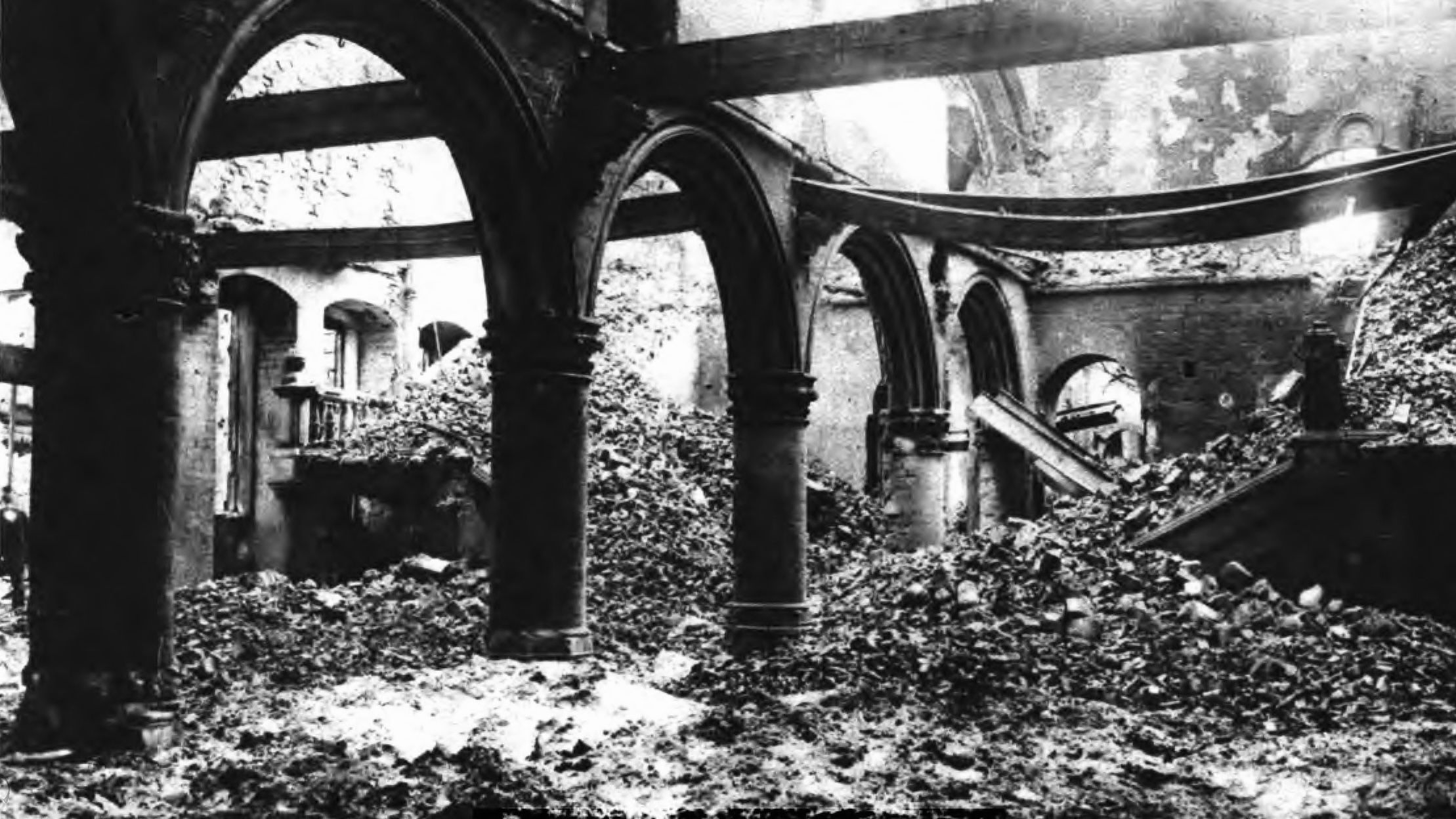
The University Library, Leuven, after fire damage in the First World War

A Carnegie library was built in the 1920s for the University of Leuven to replace a building destroyed in the First World War.

Funding came from the Carnegie Endowment for International Peace, which also built libraries in the war-damaged cities of Rheims and Belgrade. The architect of the Leuven library was Whitney Warren. Although the architect was American, he employed a Flemish style for this commission. His building in turn suffered severe damage in the Second World War, but has been restored. (For more details of this library, see Catholic University of Leuven.)

== France ==
The Carnegie library of Reims is the single Carnegie library in France. Reims was devastated in the First World War and the losses included library accommodation in the town-hall. The provision of a new library was conceived as a contribution to the city's reconstruction. Reims was one of three "front-line" cities to be given a Carnegie library, the other two being Leuven and Belgrade.

The Art Deco building was finished in 1927, and opened the following year in the presence of Gaston Doumergue, the French President and Myron T. Herrick, the US ambassador. The building was restored at the beginning of the 21st century. The library stock includes some materials that survived World War I.

== Ireland ==
Carnegie libraries are to be found throughout Ireland. Libraries vary considerably in size, some of the rural ones being very small, but the smallest must be the cabinets used for the Carnegie Library Lighthouse Service. 80 were constructed originally and 62 survive in their current form as of 2020 although some no longer function as libraries.

A full list and description of Carnegie libraries in Ireland is in Irish Carnegie Libraries: a Catalogue & Architectural History. The examples listed below are in the Republic of Ireland.

County	Location and street	Image	Notes
Cork	Anglesea Street		foundation stone laid 1903; destroyed in the Burning of Cork
Cork	Ashe Street. Youghal		Also used as a Quaker meeting house
Cork	Millstreet		
Dublin	Balbriggan		Built c1905
Dublin	Ballsbridge		(1929)
Dublin	Blackrock, Dublin		
Dublin	Cabinteely		
Dublin	Clondalkin		
Dublin	Dalkey		
Dublin	Charleville Mall, North Strand		
Dublin	Dundrum, Dublin		still in use as a library
Dublin	Dún Laoghaire		
Dublin	Garristown		1912
Dublin	Glencullen		1907
Dublin	Kish Bank lighthouse		
Dublin	Lusk, County Dublin		(1908)
Dublin	Malahide		
Dublin	Pearse Street, Dublin City Public Libraries and Archive		
Dublin	Rathmines		(1913)
Dublin	Sandyford		
Dublin	Shankill		(1912, R.M Butler)
Dublin	Skerries, County Dublin		Strand street. 1911, still in use as a library
Dublin	Swords, County Dublin		
Dublin	Whitechurch, Dublin		(1911)
Kerry	Caherciveen		
Kerry	Castleisland		
Kerry	Dingle		
Kerry	Kenmare		
Kerry	Killorglin		1909
Kerry	Listowel		
Kerry	Tralee		
Kilkenny	Kilkenny city, John's Quay		1910, still in use as a library
Limerick	Athea		1917
Limerick	Askeaton		
Limerick	Ballyhahill		
Limerick	Ballysteen		
Limerick	Broadford, County Limerick		
Limerick	Clouncagh		1917
Limerick	Croagh		
Limerick	Feenagh, County Limerick		
Limerick	Kilcolman		
Limerick	Kildimo		
Limerick	Pery Square, Limerick City		1906, Limerick City Gallery of Art
Limerick	Newcastle West		
Limerick	Pallaskenry		
Limerick	Rathkeale		
Limerick	Shanagolden, County Limerick		
Louth	Drogheda		
Waterford	Ballyduff, County Waterford		
Waterford	Cappoquin		
Waterford	Lismore, County Waterford		1910
Waterford	Tallow, County Waterford		
Waterford	Waterford City Library		foundation stone laid 1903 – first Carnegie library in Ireland and still in use
Wicklow	Bray, County Wicklow		
Wicklow	Enniskerry		
Wicklow	Greystones		

== Netherlands ==
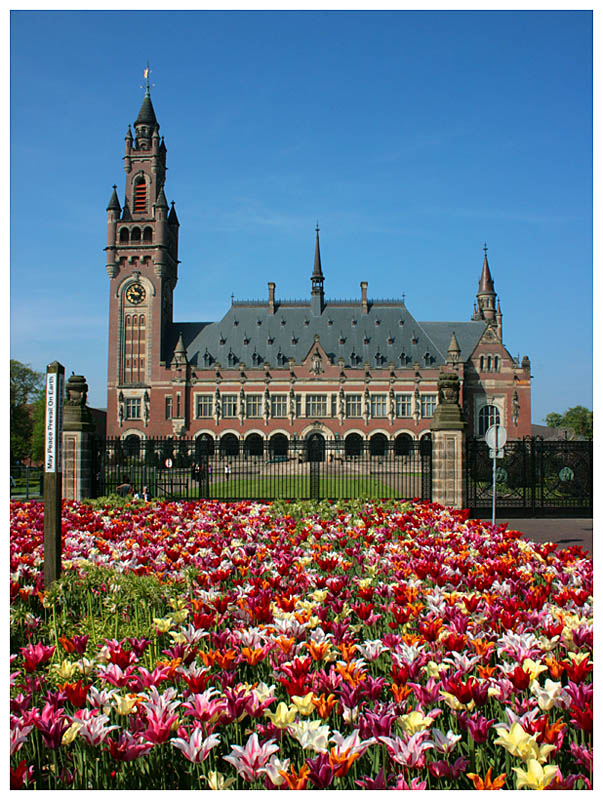
Peace Palace, The Hague, The Netherlands (2007)

The Peace Palace Library is a library in The Hague. A financial donation by Andrew Carnegie made the construction of the Peace Palace possible.

== Serbia ==
The Belgrade University Library, Serbia, is a Carnegie library. Much of Belgrade was destroyed in the First World War, and in the 1920s it became one of three "front-line" cities to receive a Carnegie library, the other two being Leuven and Rheims.

== United Kingdom ==
The Dunfermline Carnegie Library was the first Carnegie library to be built in Scotland; it opened in Carnegie's birthplace in 1883. Carnegie libraries in England began to be built at the beginning of the 20th century. In his retirement, Carnegie divided his time between the US and Scotland, and opened some British libraries personally.

In Britain the process of applying for a Carnegie library was broadly similar to that in the US. It was adapted to British legislation, e.g. the Public Libraries Act, which permitted expenditure from the rates on local libraries. Carnegie assessed applications using criteria which favoured poorer towns, but applicants had to undertake to support their library, providing it with books etc. from the rates. While most towns were very grateful to receive a grant, Carnegie's project was not without controversy. For example, some people objected to the way in which he had made his money. In the case of Stratford-on-Avon there were objections to the proposed building for conservation reasons, and this resulted in a library which blends into the half-timbered neighbouring buildings.

Most Carnegie libraries served the general population of towns and cities, but he also provided some academic libraries in the UK. (This pattern of town and academic libraries was in line with his policy in the US where he provided a number of college libraries, for example at Tuskegee University.) In Stoke-on-Trent the Carnegie United Kingdom Trust funded a specialist ceramics library. The existence of special collections with catalogues gave scope for the development of interlibrary loans.

From 1913 applications were handled by the Carnegie United Kingdom Trust, based in Carnegie's home town, Dunfermline. The trust continued to fund libraries after Carnegie's death in 1919, but its priorities shifted to other areas of its charitable work.

=== Current status of Carnegie libraries ===
As at 2011 many of the UK's Carnegie libraries continue to be used for their original purpose. However, Carnegie libraries are being affected by local authority budget cuts which are reducing the number of public libraries across the country.

Some Carnegie libraries are unprotected by the listing system. Over the years some Carnegie libraries have been demolished, e.g. Grays (details in the list below) On the other hand, new uses have been found for other Carnegie libraries, e.g. Pontefract's Carnegie library is now a museum.

=== England ===
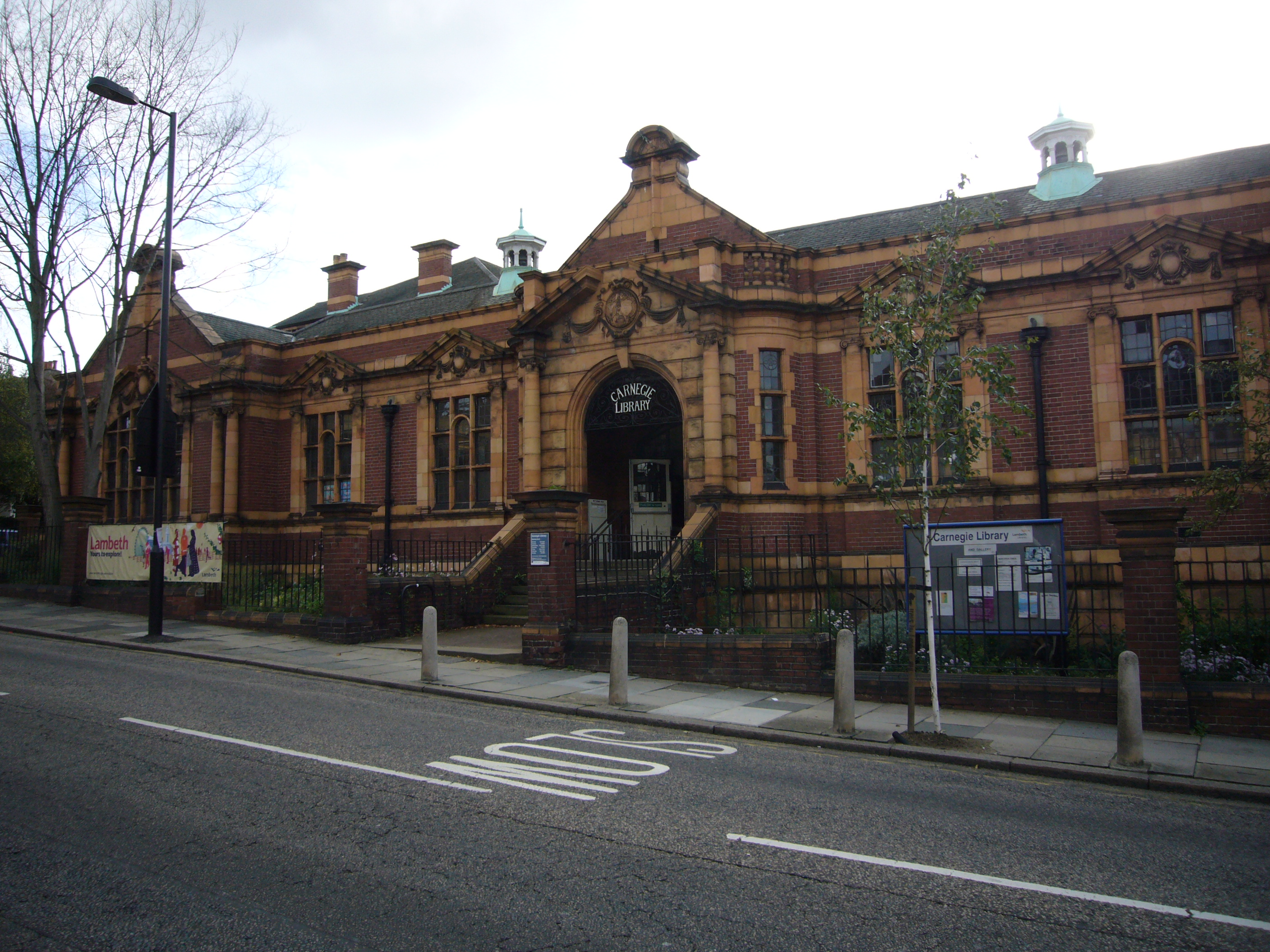
Herne Hill Library was built in 1906 and now Grade II listed.

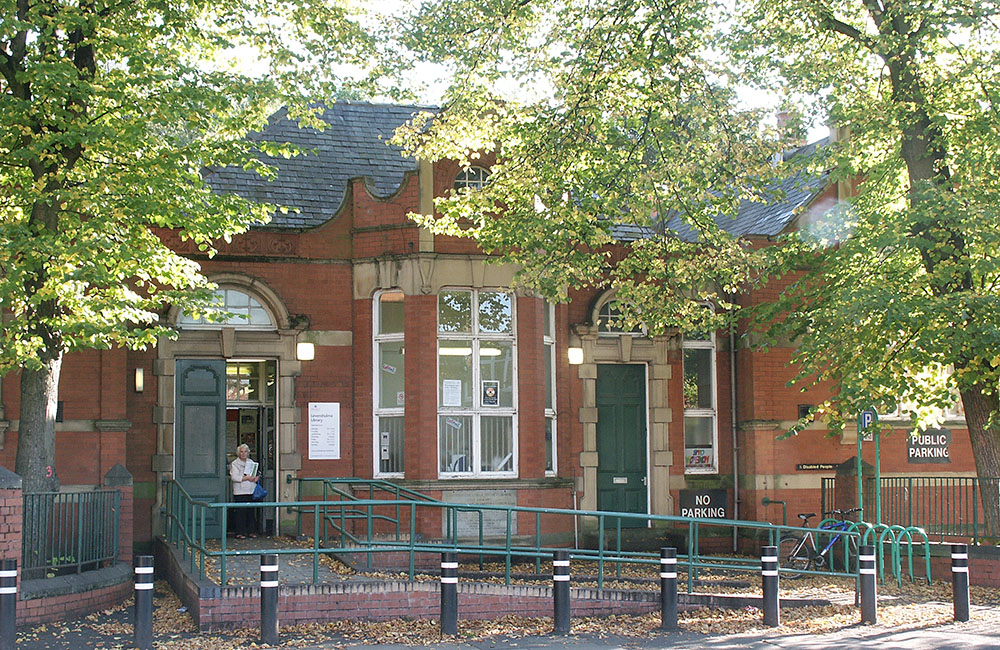
Levenshulme Library, a Carnegie library in a small Manchester suburb, was built in 1904.

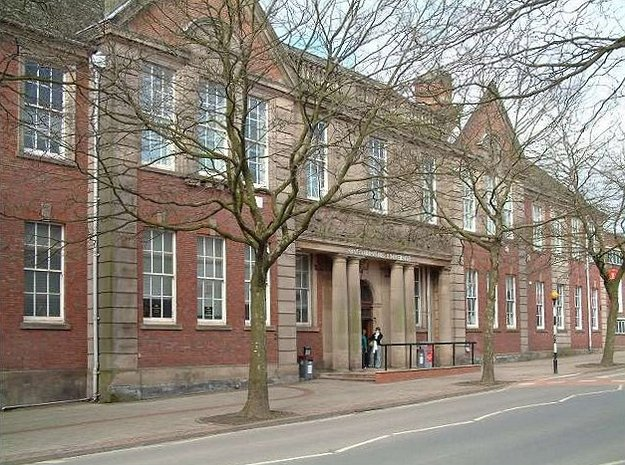
The technical college, Stoke-on-Trent, housed the Solon Carnegie Library. Unusually, this building of 1914 was provided from public funds and the books themselves by Carnegie.

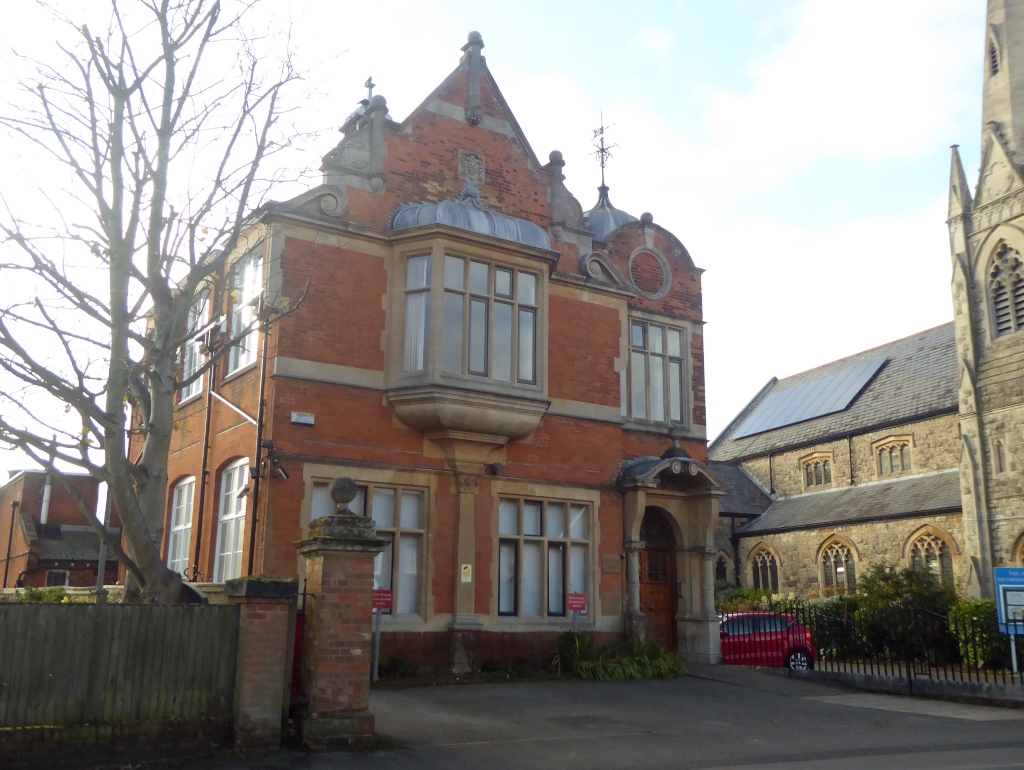
Former Carnegie library in Sevenoaks

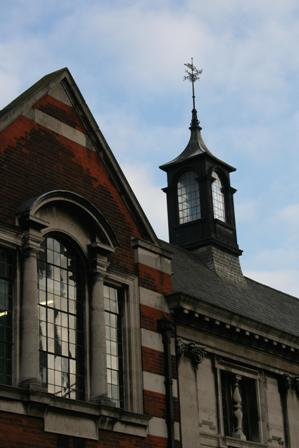
Southend-on-Sea Public Library (1905), in use since 1981 as the town's museum

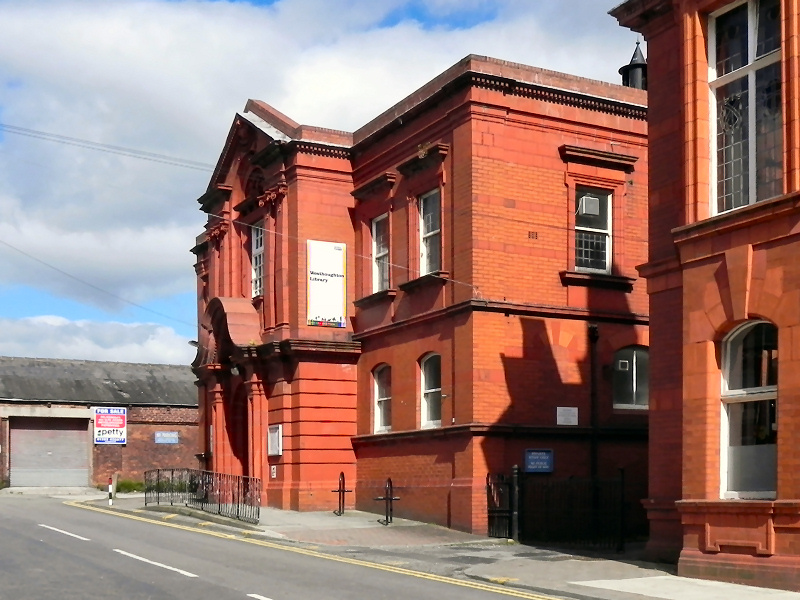
Westhoughton Library and Museum (1906)

- London
  - Brentford Library 1903, brick and terracotta construction, designed by Nowell Parr, Grade II listed.
  - Bromley 1908, designed by Evelyn Hellicar (1862–1929), now demolished.
  - Crofton Park 1905, brick and stone (community run by Eco Communities and Lewisham Borough).
  - Cubitt Town 1905, brick and stone (Tower Hamlets Council)
  - Custom House, 1905, brick and stone. Still in use as a public library.
  - Deptford, 1914, brick and stone (closed 1991, now Lewisham Arthouse artists' studios, public gallery and workshop).
  - Enfield, 1912, heavily extended to the rear in 2010.
  - Enfield Highway, 1910. Extended in 1938.
  - Erith 1906, Grade II listed in 1996. Partly occupied, following relocation of the library in 2009.
  - Hanwell designed by T Gibbs Thomas in 1905/06 (run by London Borough of Ealing).
  - Herne Hill 1906, Grade II listed (closed by London Borough of Lambeth 31 March 2016 due to budget cuts, reopened 2018).
  - Homerton 1913, Grade II listed (Chats Palace Arts Centre since 1976)
  - Islington, Grade II listed,
    - North Library (1906)
    - West Library (1907)
    - Central Library (1907)
    - South Library (construction finished: 1916, opening: 1921)
  - King's College, London: The Carnegie Collection of British Music on loan to The Maughan Library.
  - Kingston upon Thames 1903, Carnegie also funded the separate building for the Kingston Museum 1904.
  - Lea Bridge Road, Leyton.
  - Manor Park, 1905, brick and stone (library relocated 2012–2013).
  - New Cross, 1911, brick and stone, designed by Gerald Warren & Stanley E Castle (now Music Room studios)
  - Southall, 1905, closed down in 2014 and relocated services to Dominion Centre in The Green. Library building is now being used to house the Southall Christian Fellowship.
  - Sydenham (run by London Borough of Lewisham).
  - Teddington 1906, brick and stone construction.
  - Thornton Heath.
  - Twickenham 1906/7.
  - Walthamstow 1907–09.
  - West Greenwich 1907.
- Birmingham.
  - Aston Cross, 1903.
  - Bartley Green 1905.
  - Birchfield, extension 1904.
  - Erdington 1907.
  - King's Heath 1905, Renaissance classical style with art nouveau features Grade II listed.
  - King's Norton 1906.
  - Northfield Library 1906, destroyed by fire in 1914, reputedly the work of suffragettes, rebuilt using original facade.
  - Rednal 1909.
  - Selly Oak Library 1906.
  - Stirchley 1907.
- Coventry
  - Earlsdon Library 1913.
  - Foleshill Library 1913, extended 2008.
  - Stoke Library 1913.
- Greater Manchester
  - Ashton-in-Makerfield 1906, Grade II listed in 2009. Temporarily closed in 2024 for roof repairs.
  - Castleton, Rochdale 1905
  - Chadderton 1904-05 Former civic library, Jacobean Revival, designed by J Lindsay Grant of Manchester for Chadderton UDC with funding from Andrew Carnegie.Building was vacated for a new 'Civic Hub' in 2010 and now privately owned. Listed as Grade II in 2011.
  - Chorlton, Greater Manchester.
  - Didsbury 1915.
  - Eccles 1907.
  - Farnworth, Bolton Metropolitan Borough, 1911.
  - Levenshulme 1904.
  - Milnrow, Greater Manchester.
  - Pemberton 1907, Ormskirk Road, Pemberton, Grade II listed. Library now closed, used as office space.
  - Royton 1907.
  - Stockport 1913, brick and stone construction. In control of Stockport Metropolitan Borough Council, still in use as Central Library.
  - Tyldesley 1909, brick and stone construction.
  - Westhoughton 1906, situated at the rear of the Town Hall.
- Lancashire
  - Accrington Library 1907 (run by Lancashire County Council).
  - Burnley 1930 (run by Lancashire County Council).
  - Clitheroe 1905, grade II listed
  - Darwen 1908, Yorkshire stone.
  - Haslingden (run by Lancashire County Council).
  - Rawtenstall
  - Oswaldtwistle 1915 (run by Lancashire County Council).
  - St Annes-on-the-Sea (Lytham St Annes) 1906, brick and terracotta construction (run by Lancashire County Council).
- Merseyside
  - Birkenhead, demolished.
  - Crosby 1905, brick and stone, Grade II Listed (closed by Sefton Metropolitan Borough Council in December 2013 - currently a local charity Regenerus is working to develop it as a Carnegie-Crosby a 3rd space for the community).
  - Garston, Liverpool.
  - Newton-le-Willows 1909, built with a grant of £4,000 (run by St. Helens Metropolitan Borough Council).
  - Sefton Park, Liverpool 1911. Mock Tudor style building with a modern 1960s extension.
  - Wallasey Central Library.
- Almondbury 1906 (Kirklees)
- Annfield Plain 1908 (run by Durham County Council).
- Arnold, Nottinghamshire, 1906, (demolished in the 1980s)
- Ashby (now part of Scunthorpe). Opened in Ashby High Street in April 1906. Built with a grant of £1,500.
- Barrow in Furness 1922 (run by Westmorland and Furness Council).
- Batley 1907.
- Bideford 1905.
- Blackheath, opened 15 November 1909, Grade II listed. Closed in 2011 and now a children's daycare centre.
- Blackpool 1911, Grade II listed.
- Brierley Hill, 1904, Designed by the borough surveyor to Brierley Hill, Lewis Harper and built by CA Horton.
- Bolton on Dearne 1903, brick. One of the first Carnegie libraries outside Scotland. Formerly Council Offices, currently disused. Community group attempting to raise funds to restore the building and re-open it as a Fitness/Martial arts/Boxing centre for local youth.
- Boston Opened in West Street in 1904. Built as part of the Municipal Buildings with a grant of £560.
- Bournemouth Four Carnegie Libraries:- 1907 Winton Branch Library, built with £2,000 from the Carnegie fund, opened on 26 October, by Mayor J. A. Parsons, Grade II listed in 1976; 1909 Springbourne Branch Library, built with £2,000 from the Carnegie fund, opened on 27 March, by Mayor G. E. Bridge; 1910 Boscombe Branch Library, built with £4,000 from the Carnegie fund, designed by Mt C. T. Miles, opened on 22 June, by Mayor G. E. Bridge (relocated to new buildings in 1965); 1916 Westbourne Branch Library, built with £2,000 from the Carnegie fund, opened on 13 May, by Mayor H. Robson, Grade II listed in 1976.
- Bridgwater 1905, Edwardian Baroque style, Grade II listed.
- Calne 1905.
- Caversham, Reading 1907.
- Chatham: Designed by George Edward Bond and opened in 1903 by Mayor William D. Driver, the library was partially funded by a £4,500 Carnegie grant. It closed in 1971 due to dry rot and was demolished in 1984.
- Cleator Moor: 1906, grade II listed.
- Cockermouth.
- Cradley Heath, built by Rowley Regis Urban District Council, opened 15 November 1909, Grade II Listed.
- Dalton-in-Furness 1905.
- Dartford Opened in 1916. Built with a grant of £7,400, Red brick and Bath stone, Grade-II listed in 1975 (run by Kent County Council).
- Derby, Pear Tree Road.
- Eastbourne Opened in Grove Road in August 1904. Built with a grant of £10,000. Destroyed in an air raid 1943.
- Eastleigh 1935. The building now forms part of The Point theatre and dance studio, the library having relocated.
- Fenton 1906, brick and stone construction (run by Stoke-on-Trent City Council) - closed 31 March 2011 due to budget cuts.
- Folkestone The existing library in Grace Hill was extended with a grant of £5,000 from Andrew Carnegie and opened in October 1910. Closed in December 2022 until further notice due to water damage.
- Gainsborough Opened in Cobden Street in October 1905. Built with a grant of £4,000.
- Goole Opened in Carlisle Street in 1905 with a grant of £3,000. Demolished in the 1960s.
- Gorleston-on-Sea Opened on the corner of Baker Street and Lowestoft Road in April 1907 and built with a grant of £2,000. Demolished in 1975.
- Grantham Opened in St Peter's Hill in 1926. Originally built to house the town's library and museum, with partial funding from the Carnegie UK Trust. The library has since been relocated, but the building has continued in use as a museum.
- Gravesend Opened in Windmill Street in 1905. Built with a grant of £6,000. Grade-II listed in 1975 (run by Kent County Council).
- Grays Free Library opened in Orsett Road in 1903. Built with a grant of £3,000. Later demolished. Replaced by Essex County Council cultural centre in 1968, with Library on ground floor (run by Thurrock unitary authority). Some remnants of the library remain.
- Great Yarmouth Opened April 1905. Built with a grant of £5,000. Damaged in an air raid in 1941 and again in 1942. This library was subsequently demolished.
- Hartlepool was built in 1903. The building was designed by H.C. Crummack, Borough Engineer.The library and adjoining former librarian's house (no. 72 Northgate) is Grade II listed on the National Heritage List for England.
- Harrogate Opened in Victoria Avenue in 1906. Built with a grant of £7,500. Re-opened in October 2010 following refurbishment (run by North Yorkshire Council).
- Hove 1908, Renaissance style faced with stone, Grade II listed.
- Huthwaite opened 1913, now owned by Nottinghamshire County Council and still serving the people of Huthwaite
- Hull Opened in Analby Road in 1905. Built with a grant of £3,000. Grade II listed, now the "Carnegie Heritage Centre".
- Ilkeston. Built with a grant of £7,500 and opened in 1904, this Grade II listed building sits prominently on the marketplace and still operates as a library.
- Ipswich Opened in Northgate Street in 1924.
- Irchester Opened November 1909. Built with a grant of £1,000.
- Keighley 1904, stone construction (run by Bradford Metropolitan District Council). Grade II listed. The first library in England endowed by Carnegie.
- Kendal 1909, stone construction (run by Westmorland and Furness Council)
- Kettering 1904, built with a grant of £8,450, a "jewelled casket of learning" opened by Andrew himself at age 68 years
- King's Lynn library, opened in London Road in 1905 and built with a grant of £5,000.
- Knutsford, red brick and terracotta construction, built in 1904. Now a day nursery.
- Langley, Sandwell, brick and terracotta construction.
- Leicester Opened 1905 by Carnegie in person. Built with a grant of £12,000. Grade II listed.
- Loughborough, Leicestershire built in 1905
- Lincoln Opened in Free School Lane in 1913. Built with a grant of £10,000.
- Littlehampton 30 May 1906. Maltravers Road BN17 5NA. The extended & refurbished modern library is run by West Sussex County Council.
- Lowestoft Opened in Clapham Road in May 1905. Destroyed in an air raid March 1941.
- Luton Opened 1 October 1910. Built with a grant of £12,000. Demolished in 1962.
- Mansfield Opened in Leeming Street in May 1905. Built with a grant of £3,500. Remained a library until 1977, and is currently used as an arts centre.
- Melton Mowbray Opened in Thorpe End in 1905. Built with a grant of £2,000. Used as a public library until 1974; now Melton Carnegie Museum
- Middlesbrough Central library 1912. Middlesbrough’s main public library.
- Neston 1907 (run by Cheshire West and Chester Council).
- Newbury Opened in Cheap Street in May 1906, Built with a grant of £2,000. Used as the town's public library until 2000.
- Newcastle upon Tyne Opened in Benwell area in 1909
- New Mills 1910, built with a grant of £2,000.
- Normanton, West Yorkshire 1907, red brick.
- Northampton Opened in Abington Street in 1910, to a design by Herbert Norman.
- Penistone 1913, (now used as offices for Barnsley Council).
- Pontefract 1904, Art nouveau building which now serves as a museum.
- Portsmouth 1906, Edwardian baroque and free Renaissance style.
- Peterborough Opened officially by Carnegie in Broadway in May 1906. Built with a grant of £6,000. Used as the public library until 1990.
- Ramsgate, Kent 1904
- Rawmarsh 1905
- Runcorn The existing library was altered and extended in 1906 with a grant of £3,000 from Andrew Carnegie. Used as a public library until 2012.
- Rushden Opened in Newton Road in November 1905. Built with a grant of £2,000.
- St Albans Opened in 1911 on Victoria Street. Librarian - Ernest William Green. Fine Edwardian Baroque building. It is now a city centre pub.
- Sandown Opened in High Street in July 1905. Built with a grant of £2,000 (run by Isle of Wight County Council, threatened with closure).
- Scunthorpe Opened in Station Road (now High Street East) in February 1904. Used as a public library until 1974. Demolished c.1985.
- Sevenoaks Opened in The Drive in November 1905. Built with a grant of £3,000. Used as a public library until 1986.
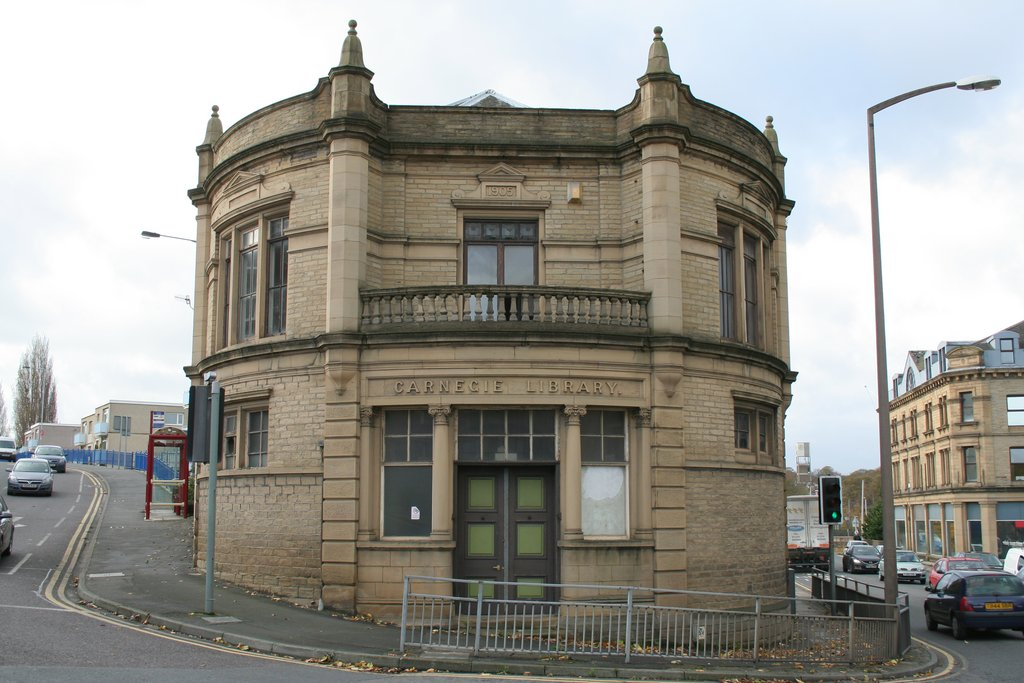
- Shipley, West Yorkshire 1905, stone construction. The building is no longer in use as a library.
  Shipley, West Yorkshire 1905, stone construction. The building is no longer in use as a library, and has been fully refurbished and converted into offices, and is now the head office of the Carlton Care Group.
- Skipton, North Yorkshire, North Yorkshire 1910 operated by North Yorkshire Council
- Solon Carnegie Library, no building provided. This academic library comprised books on ceramics. The collection is now in the Horace Barks Reference Library, Stoke-on-Trent.
- Southend-on-Sea, 1905, Public Library designed by Henry Hare. Since 1981, the building has been in use as the Central Museum, Southend.
- Sowerby Bridge (Near Halifax) 1905, stone (run by Calderdale MBC)
- Stafford Old Borough Library. Opened 1914, closed as a library in 1998. Grade II listed.
- Stamford, Lincolnshire Opened in High Street in 1906. Building converted for library use with a grant of £2,500. Grade II listed.
- Stapleford, Nottinghamshire 1906. Used as a public library until replacement by modern premises in 1981. Then fell into disrepair until purchased by Stapleford Town Council in 1987 and subsequently renovated and re-opened in 1988 as The Carnegie Centre. Now home to Stapleford Town Council. In use as library during 2013 as the 1981 library is refurbished.
- Stourbridge, 1904, Grade II Listed
- Stratford-upon-Avon, partly timber construction.
- Sunderland - Hendon 1908, Kayll Road 1909, Monkwearmouth 1909
- Taunton, Opened 1905, closed in 1996 and is now a wine bar.
- Tinsley Carnegie Library, opened in June 1905, a few months before Sheffield's more well known Carnegie library at Walkley, and seven years before Tinsley became part of Sheffield. It served as the branch library until 1985 when the service moved to a new building.
- Tividale, opened 15 November 1909, closed 1966.
- Tuebrook, Liverpool. Closed in 2006 due to health and safety concerns. Now being redeveloped as a community hub by local charity Lister Steps.
- Walkley, Sheffield 1905, Grade II listed.
- Walsall Central Library, of red brick and stone. Opened 24 July 1906 at a cost of £8,000.
- Drury Lane Library, Wakefield 1905, stone. Library now closed, replaced by a new library and museum within the Wakefield One civic office building which opened to the public on Monday 29 October 2012, with the lending library on the upper ground floor and local studies section and museum on the lower ground floor. The building was converted by The Art House in 2014 into 34 artists' studios.
- Wednesbury 1908, red brick and limestone at a cost of £5,000.
- West Bromwich 1907, Ruabon facing bricks with Portland stone and terracotta detailing.
- Workington 1904, built as a library and lecture hall. In use as the Carnegie theatre & arts centre since 1973.
- Worthing 1908. Built by Worthing Corporation, the building survives as Worthing Museum & Art Gallery. Today's library was built next door, opened in 1975 and is run by West Sussex County Council.

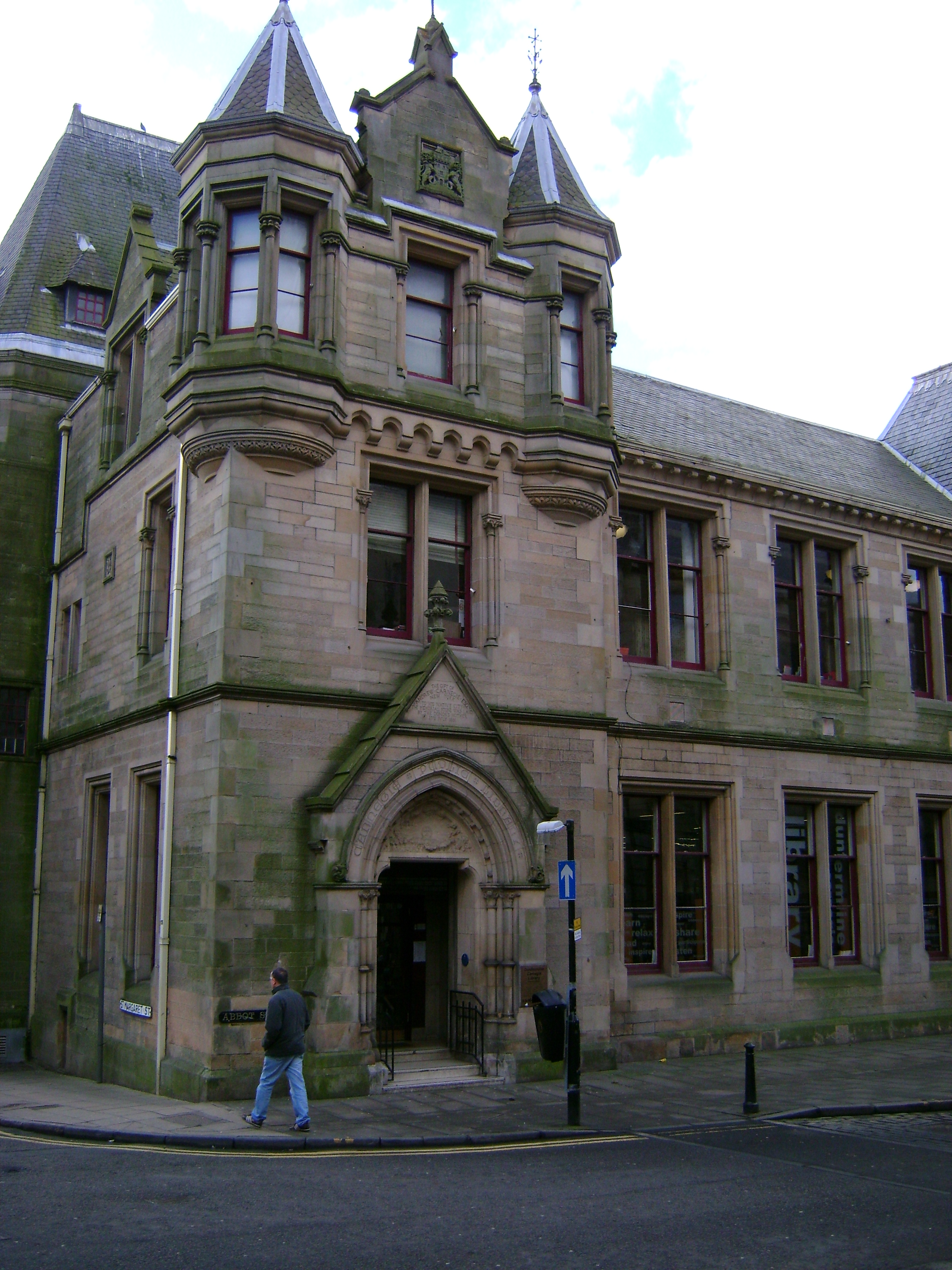
The first Carnegie library to open in Andrew Carnegie's home town of Dunfermline in Scotland

=== Scotland ===
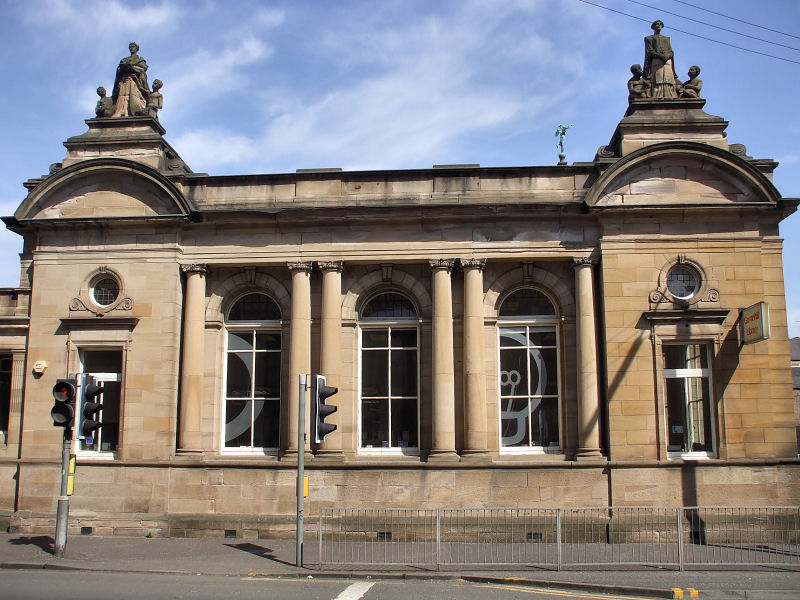
Govanhill & Crosshill District Library, Scotland, built in 1906 by architect James Robert Rhind

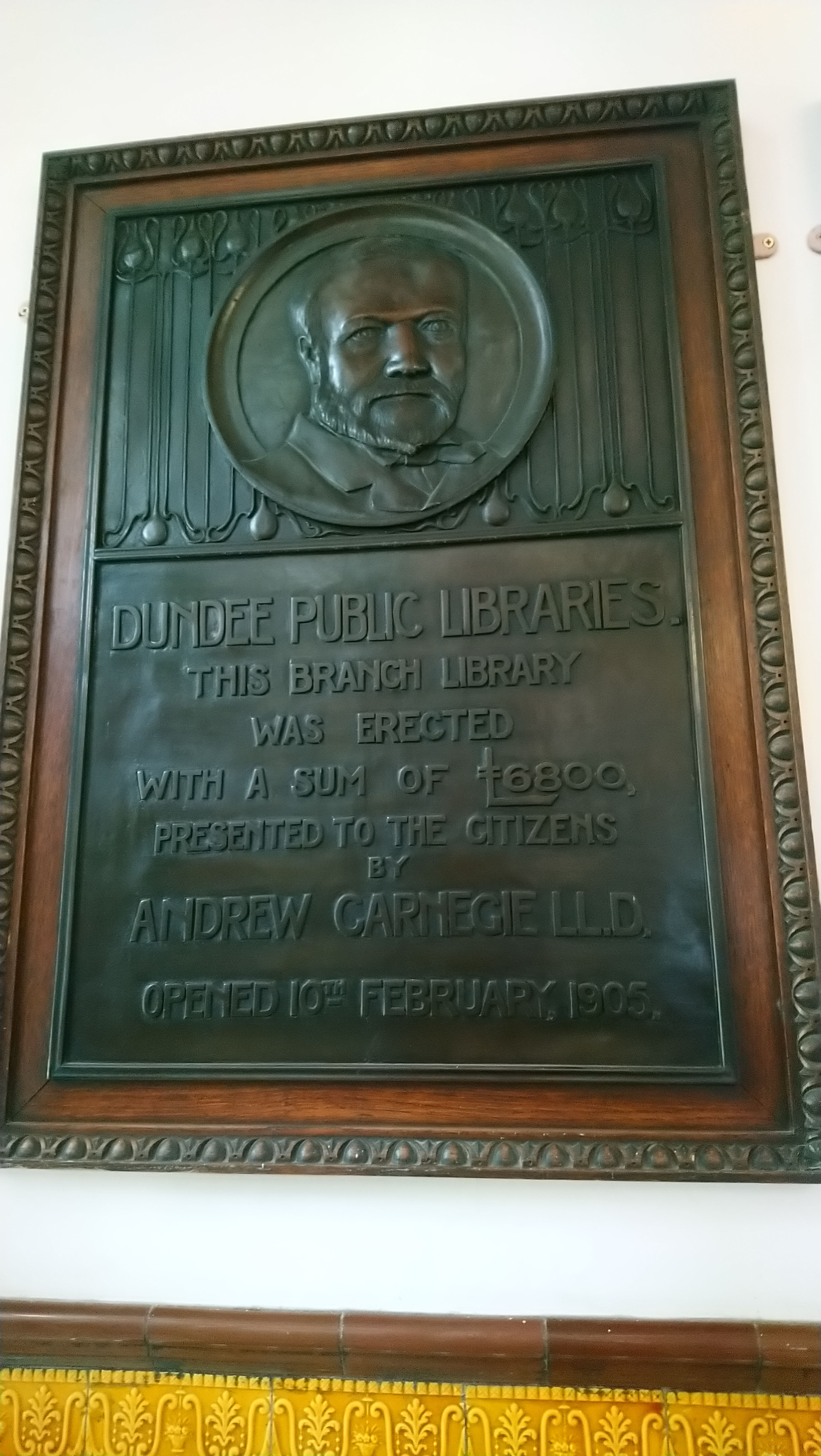
Plaque in Arthurstone Library, Dundee, Scotland acknowledging donation by Andrew Carnegie

In Scotland the Carnegie libraries were typically built of stone. In the rest of the British Isles there was much more use of brick. The drawings of the Carnegie libraries designed by architect James Robert Rhind are in the Strathclyde Archives, Glasgow.

- Aberdeen Central Library 1892
- Airdrie Public Library 1894 and 1925
- Arthurstone Library, Dundee 1905 - still in use as a library
- Carnegie Library, Ayr 1893
- Blackness Library, Dundee - still in use as a library
- Bridgeton District Library, 1903 by architect James Robert Rhind (now used as Glasgow Women's Library)
- Broughty Ferry Library, Dundee - still in use as a library
- Bo'ness
- Burntisland
- Castle Douglas Library 1904 by architect George Washington Browne.
- Bonnyrigg
- Coatbridge library 1905 pink sandstone construction
- Coldside Library, Dundee 1908 - still in use as a library
- Dennistoun Library, 1905 by architect James Robert Rhind
- Ewart Library, Dumfries, named at Carnegie's suggestion after William Ewart, MP for Dumfries Burghs 1841–1868, in 1850 he carried a bill for establishing free libraries supported out of public rates.
- Dunfermline Carnegie Library, Dunfermline, 1883, the first Carnegie library
- Edinburgh, Central Lending Library 1890, French Renaissance style, by George Washington Browne.
- Fraserburgh
- Govanhill & Crosshill District Library, 1906 by architect James Robert Rhind
- Grangemouth 1889, the second Carnegie library (which opened shortly before Braddock, the first Carnegie library in the US)
- Hamilton townhouse library 1907
- Hawick Library 1904
- Hugh Miller Institute, Cromarty, 1902 by architect Alexander Ross, named after local geologist and writer Hugh Miller.
- Hutchesontown District Library, 1904 by architect James Robert Rhind
- Inverurie Public Library, August 1911 by architect Harbourne Maclennan
- Iona, 1911.
- Kirkwall 1909, no longer in use as a library.
- Jedburgh Library - there were two and the replacement opened nearby. Now under threat
- Kinross
- Kingston District Library, Paisley Road 1904 originally shared with the Kingston Halls and the local police station, is now a doss house
- Maryhill Public Library, 1903 by architect James Robert Rhind
- Maxton, Roxburghshire (Now used as a village hall).
- Maybole
- Montrose, Angus
- Motherwell
- Parkhead District Library, 1906 by architect James Robert Rhind
- Reading Rooms Dundee (previously Blackscroft Library), 1910 by architect James Thomson
- Rutherglen 1907
- Stirling Central Library, 1902 by architect Harry Ramsay Taylor
- Tain, Highland
- Thurso, Highland 1910, by architect Sinclair MacDonald
- Wick, Highland 1897
- West Calder 1904
- Woodside Library, 1905 by architect James Robert Rhind

=== Wales ===
Carnegie's libraries were not exclusively for English-speakers. The Bangor library was called Llyfrgell Rydd ("Free Library" in Welsh).

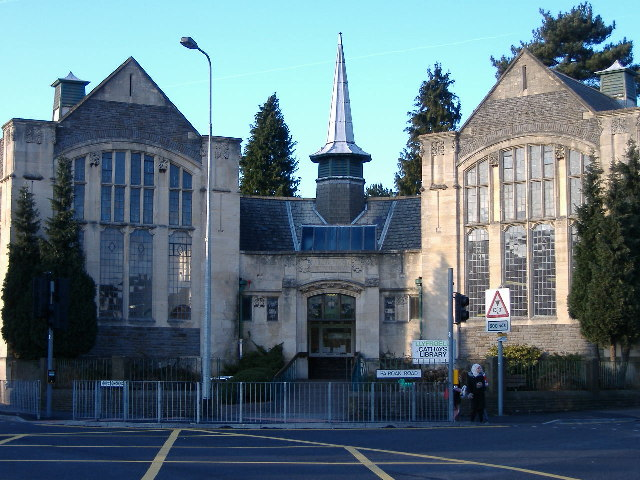
Cathays Library, in Cardiff, opened 1906

- Abercanaid 1903, demolished
- Abergavenny 1906, Grade II listed
- Aberystwyth 1906
- Bangor 1907, brick and stone construction
- Barry 1906 (opened on St David's day by the Earl of Plymouth)
- Bridgend - former Old Library 1906 now Carnegie House (2014), Council Offices and Arts/Culture Hub
- Brynmawr 1905 - now a museum
- Buckley 1904 - now Buckley Town Council offices
- Canton, Cardiff 1907
- Cathays, Cardiff 1907
- Church Village (Llantwit Fardre) 1906 - now the Parish Hall
- Coedpoeth 1904, local sandstone construction
- Colwyn Bay 1905
- Criccieth 1905 (opened on St David's day by JE Greaves, lord lieutenant of Caernarfonshire)
- Deiniolen 1913
- Dolgellau 1913
- Dowlais, Merthyr Tydfil 1907
- Flint 1903
- Llandrindod Wells 1912 - now the Radnorshire museum
- Llandudno 1910
- Merthyr Tydfil 1935
- Newport: Rogerstone Library 1905, and Corporation Road Library, Newport 1904
- Penarth 1905
- Penydarren 1902
- Pontypool 1908
- Rhyl, Flintshire (now Denbighshire) 1907 no longer in use as a library. Makes up part of the town hall and is used for the registration of births, deaths and marriages.
- Skewen 1905
- Taibach, Neath Port Talbot 1914
- Trecynon, opened 1903
- Treharris 1909
- Whitchurch, Cardiff 1904
- Wrexham: Old Library 1907

=== Northern Ireland ===
- Bangor, County Down, extended, but still in use as a library.
- Belfast, Falls Road still in use as a library.
- Belfast, Donegall Road
- Belfast, Oldpark Road no longer in use
- Derry - proposed but never constructed
- Downpatrick, County Down – demolished to allow for road improvements
- Portadown, County Armagh – no longer in use as a library
- Lurgan, County Armagh, 1906 – still in use as a library.
- Larne, County Antrim, 1905 - now Larne Museum and Arts Centre.
