= Henry Cautley =

Henry Cautley may refer to:

- Henry Cautley, 1st Baron Cautley (1863–1946), British barrister, judge and politician
- Henry Munro Cautley (1876–1959), architect based in Ipswich
