= Hawick Library =

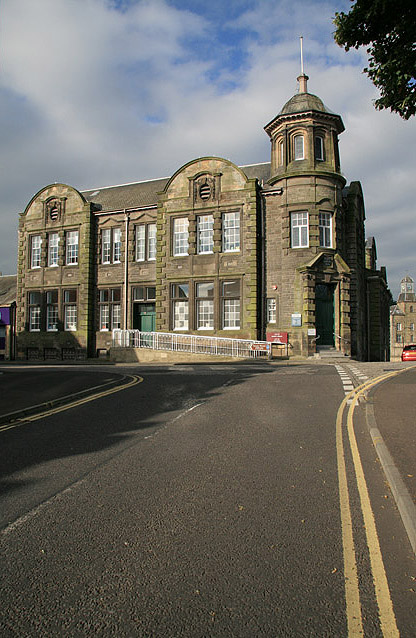
- the library front
- Interactive map of the Hawick Library area

General information
- Location: 3 Laidlaw Street, Hawick, Scotland
- Coordinates: 55°25′39″N 2°47′6″W
- Completed: 1904
- Client: Andrew Carnegie

Design and construction
- Architect: John Nichol Scott
- Designations: listed Cat B

Hawick Library is housed in the building built in 1904 in Hawick and it was one of the many libraries funded by Andrew Carnegie. The library is a Category B listed building. The library, designed by J N Scott and Alexander Lorne Campbell, is a 2-storey, rectangular-plan Free Style library with a prominent corner entrance tower and round-arched gables. The library is described as "a good example of early-20th-century civic architecture."

== History ==
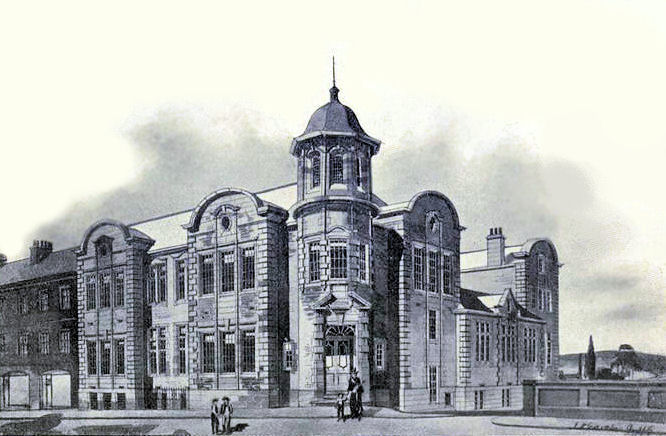
This is a 1902 drawing by John Nichol Scott of his design

In the 1800s there had been a library in Hawick but its home was within the Town Hall. A grant of £10,000 from Andrew Carnegie enabled the construction of a purpose-built building. It was one of the first design to be built by the partnership of John Nichol Scott and Alexander Lorne Campbell and Scott's design was exhibited in 1902. The new library incorporated a sculpture by William Birnie Rhind. The Scott and Campbell partnership had been formed in 1899 and although they won competitions their first designs that were built included St Stephens UF Church in Comely Bank and Hawick Library.

The building opened in 1904 and the town's celebration included a day's holiday.

The library was extended in 1939 with a reading room whose stilts created a carport. The building was recognised as a listed building in 2008.

In 2016 the local council agreed to transfer the running of its libraries including Hawick to a trust with an estimated saving of £400,000.
