= Alexander Lorne Campbell =

Scottish architect (1871-1944)

Alexander Lorne Campbell (1871–1944) was a Scottish architect, who practised across Scotland. He was founder of the successful firm of Scott & Campbell.

== Early life ==
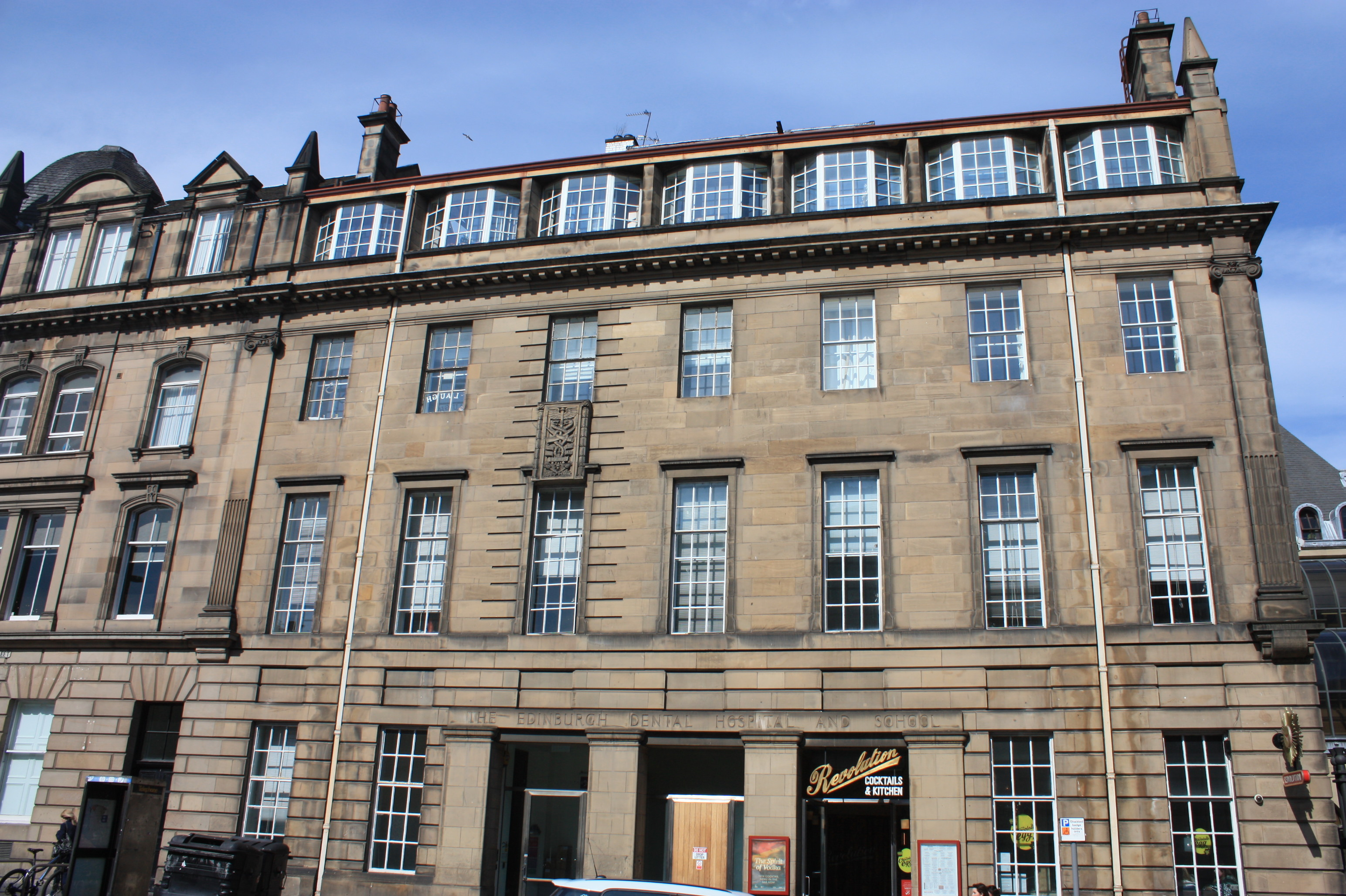
Edinburgh Dental Hospital by Alexander Lorne Campbell

He was born in Edinburgh the son of Archibald Campbell, deputy city clerk of Edinburgh. He attended George Watson’s College.

== Career ==
From 1886 to 1891 he was articled to Peter Lyle Barclay Henderson to train as an architect. In 1891 he moved to the City Architect’s Department, to work under Robert Morham. Around the same time he set up home at 3 Moston Terrace in Mayfield, Edinburgh. In 1896 he sent up in independent practice at 21 St Andrew Square, Edinburgh. After great success he moved to 44 Queen Street in 1898 in partnership with John Nichol Scott, creating the firm of Scott & Campbell.

By 1907, when both partners were elected fellows of the Royal Institute of British Architects, Campbell was living at 7 Inverleith Terrace.

Around 1914 the practice moved from Queen Street to 60 North Castle Street. Campbell’s partner, Scott, died in 1920, and Campbell thereafter went into partnership with John Begg, who was still heavily involved with public buildings in India. This partnership only lasted from 1921 to 1924.

Campbell appears to have been a close friend of Robert Rowand Anderson and although never working with him, acted on his behalf on several occasions. Campbell designed the memorial to Anderson’s wife, Lady Anderson, in Colinton and was Anderson’s executor upon his death in 1921.

In later life he became consultant architect to the General Trustees of the Church of Scotland, and was also on Edinburgh’s Dean of Guild Court. He was a leading member of the Edinburgh and East of Scotland branch of the Garden Cities Association.

== Family ==
In 1916 he had moved out of the city centre to live with his wife, Elizabeth Catherine McGregor, at West Colinton Cottage, Woodhall Road, in the quiet suburb of Colinton to the south-west. He had no children.

== Death ==
He died on 6 July 1944 and was buried in Colinton Cemetery near his home.

== Principal works ==
- Craigmillar Park Golf Clubhouse (1895) serving under Robert Morham
- St Stephens UF Church, Comely Bank, Edinburgh (1900-1)
- Hawick Library, a Carnegie Free Library, Hawick (1901)
- Remodelling of Baberton Golf Clubhouse, Juniper Green (1902)
- Leith Poorhouse (1903) (converted into the Eastern General Hospital in 1939 – now demolished)
- South African (Boer) War Memorial, Hawick (1903)
- Grange House, Linlithgow (1904)
- McDonald Road UF Church, Edinburgh (1904) now demolished
- St Andrews UF Church, Bo’ness (1905)
- Lady Anderson Memorial Cottage, Colinton (1921)
- Scottish Ministers War Memorial, St Giles Cathedral, Edinburgh (1922)
- Heriot Cross and Heriot Bridge (1922-3), part of the Grassmarket Improvement Scheme in Edinburgh
- Villa, 26 Gillespie Road, Colinton ("L’Ermitage") (1923 plus additions 1927)
- Villa, 36 Colinton Road, Edinburgh (1925)
- Remodelling of the Edinburgh Dental Hospital, Chambers Street (1925)
- St Cuthbert’s Episcopal Church Hall, Colinton (1925)
- Dechmont House, Lothian (c. 1925)
- Greenbank Church, Edinburgh (1927)
- Lochend Parish Church, Sleigh Drive, Edinburgh (1929) demolished late 20th century
- Major remodelling within Kirk Yetholm Parish Church (1934)
