= Kingston, Glasgow =

Area of Glasgow, Scotland

Coordinates: 55°51′13″N 4°16′22″W

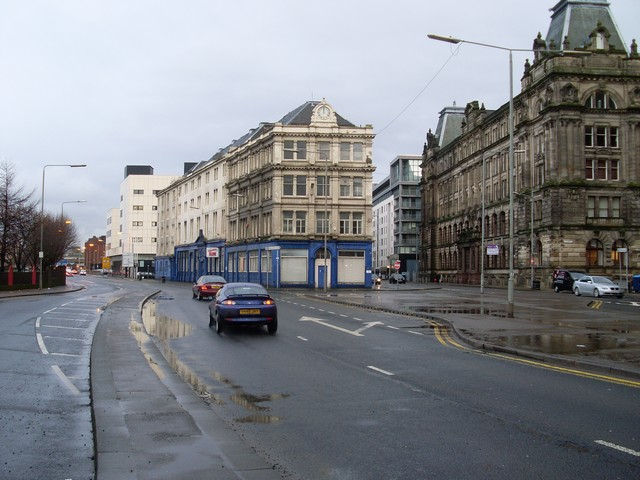
The junction of Paisley Road and Morrison Street

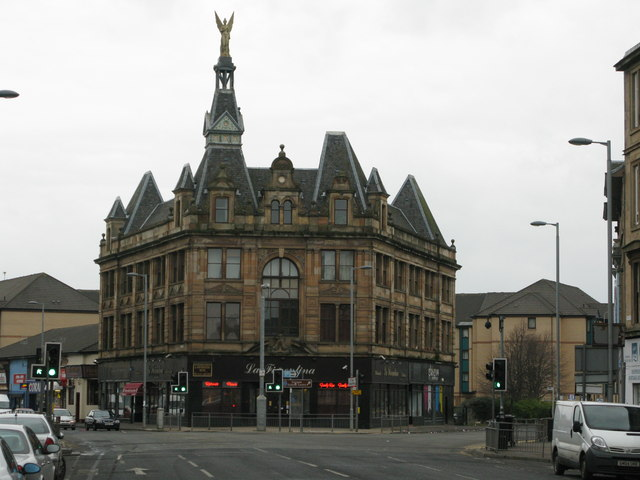
The 'Angel Building' at Paisley Road Toll

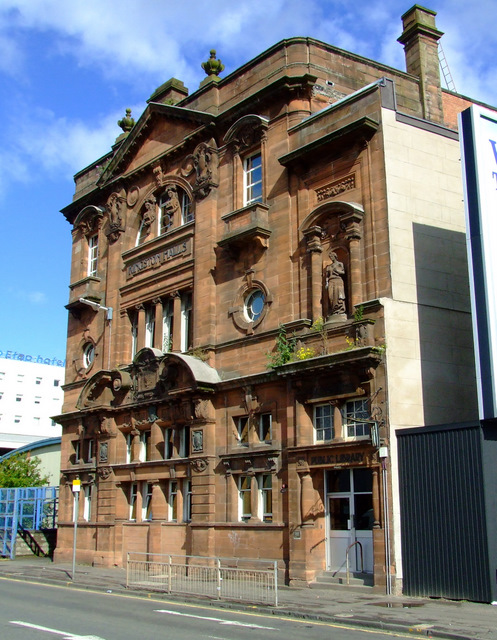
Kingston Halls

Kingston is an area of Glasgow, Scotland, from which the Kingston Bridge takes its name. Together with Ibrox, it forms one of the 56 neighbourhoods of Glasgow defined by Glasgow City Council for operational purposes. The area was assigned to Ward 54 until 2007 when it was reclassified as part of the Govan ward.

== Geography ==
Kingston is bounded by the River Clyde to the north; the Glasgow to Paisley railway line to the south; Kinning Park (at Paisley Road Toll) and Plantation to the west; and Tradeston (at West Street) to the east. The M8 motorway and the M74 extension traverse the area.

To the west of the Kingston Bridge is now a mostly commercial area, which includes the Glasgow Quay leisure complex and the Kingston Bridge Trading Estate. To the east of the bridge, several modern residential apartment developments have been constructed including: the mixed residential and commercial development within the old Scottish Co-operative Wholesale Society building, on Morrison Street; the Riverside apartments, built on what was formerly the Kingston Dock; and the Wallace Apartments, situated between Morrison Street and Wallace Street. Still further east is the smaller district of Tradeston, which adjoins Kingston on its boundary at West Street.

== Notable Kingston buildings ==
- Scotland Street School Museum, within the school building designed by Charles Rennie Mackintosh
- Kingston Halls, attributed to the architect Robert William Horn (1869-1932); it incorporated the first Carnegie funded library to be opened in the city
- Scottish Co-operative Wholesale Society Building - 1886-1893, Bruce & Hay

== Transport ==
Kingston has access to two stations on the Glasgow Subway system: Shields Road, which also serves Pollokshields; and West Street, in neighbouring Tradeston. There are also frequent bus services along Paisley Road West.

== Recreation ==
Location of Springfield Quay, also showing the Kingston Bridge

The Glasgow Quay area, developed on Springfield Quay, has in recent years become a major entertainment and leisure hub with bowling, casino, cinema and a variety of bars & restaurants.
