= Scotland Street School Museum =

Museum in Glasgow, Scotland

Coordinates: 55.8495°N 4.2737°W

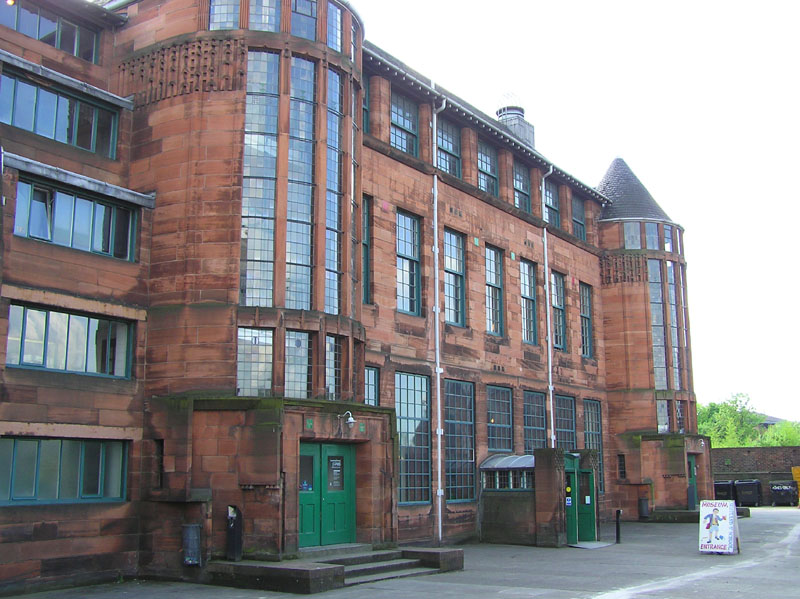
Charles Mackintosh's Scotland Street school in Glasgow

Scotland Street School Museum is a museum of school education in Glasgow, Scotland, in the district of Kingston. It is located in a former school designed by Charles Rennie Mackintosh between 1903 and 1906. The building is one of Glasgow's foremost architectural attractions. It is located next to the Shields Road subway station. The building features in the video of the Deacon Blue song Dignity and also in the video of the Billy Mackenzie song "Baby".

== History ==
Mackintosh based the design of the school on Rowallan Castle in Ayrshire and Falkland Palace. The building features a pair of windowed Scottish baronial style tower staircases and a tiled Drill Hall. The school is an important example of the Modern Style (British Art Nouveau style). During the building's construction, Mackintosh frequently battled the school board about the design (the board wanted a less expensive design). The total cost for the building was £34,291, which was over budget. The school was designed for an enrolment of 1,250. However, by the 1970s the area was experiencing urban decay, and the school's enrolment fell to under 100. The school closed in 1979 and reopened as a museum in 1990.

Activities and exhibits at the museum include an opportunity to participate in a Victorian classroom situation, with employed actors playing teachers who impose strict discipline.

The school is the subject of a 2018 documentary by Margaret Moore, Scotland Street School Remembers.

== See also ==
- Culture in Glasgow
- Glasgow School of Art
