= West Street subway station =

Glasgow subway station

West Street Sràid an Iar
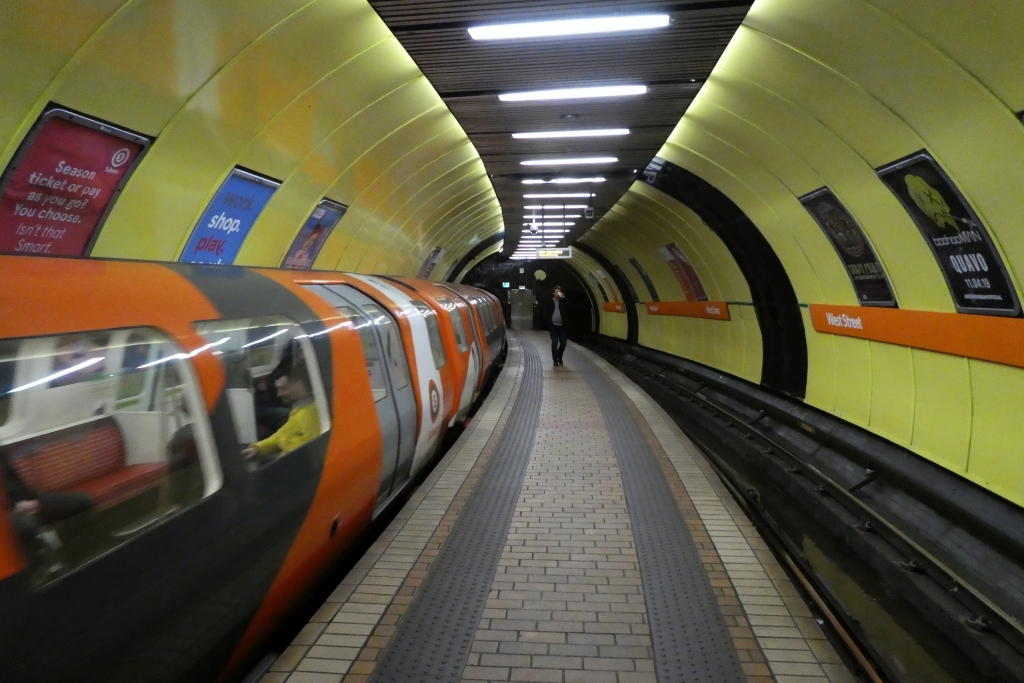

General information
- Location: 281 West Street; Tradeston, Glasgow, G5 8NB; Scotland
- Coordinates: 55°51′00″N 4°15′55″W
- Operator: SPT
- Transit authority: SPT
- Platforms: 2 (island platform)
- Tracks: 2

Construction
- Structure type: Underground
- Parking: No
- Cycle facilities: No
- Accessible: No

Other information
- Fare zone: 1

History
- Opened: 14 December 1896
- Rebuilt: 16 April 1980; 46 years ago

Passengers
- 2018: ▲96,250
- 2019: ▲104,709
- 2020: ▼44,875
- 2021: ▲56,575
- 2022: ▲78,753

Services
Preceding station	SPT	Following station
Bridge Street anticlockwise / inner circle	Glasgow Subway	Shields Road clockwise / outer circle
Location
Notes
- Passenger statistics provided are gate entries only. Information on gate exits for patronage is incomplete, and thus not included.

West Street subway station (Scottish Gaelic: Sràid an Iar) on the Glasgow Subway network serves the Tradeston and Kingston areas of Glasgow, Scotland.

Left in an isolated industrial area by post-war reconstruction, it is the least busy station on the network with just 150,000 boardings in the 12 months to 31 March 2005 and under 100,000 by 2012.

West Street was initially one of the Glasgow Park and Ride stations. However, on 16 February 2008, the car park was closed as part of the M74 construction enabling works. The east part of the large car park for Shields Road station is closer to West Street than Shields Road, but most passengers are travelling to the city centre so choose Shields Road, the earlier stop of the two in that direction, as they would be more likely to get a seat for their journey than at West Street.

The station will become a major interchange if the Glasgow Crossrail is given the green light.

West Street is one of the stations mentioned in Cliff Hanley's song The Glasgow Underground.

== Past passenger numbers ==
- 2004/05: 0.150 million annually
- 2011/12: 0.098 million annually

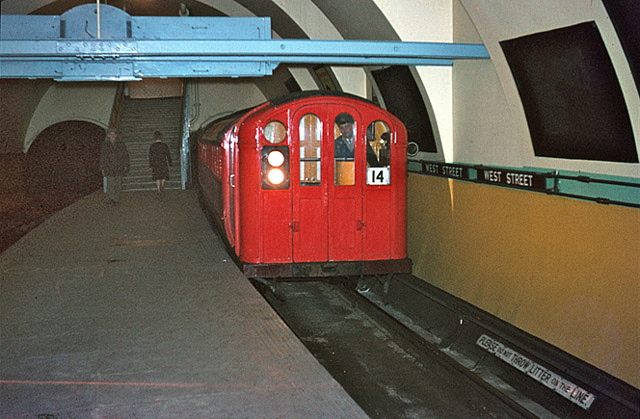
West Street in 1966
