= Shields Road subway station =

Glasgow subway station

Shields Road Rathad Shields
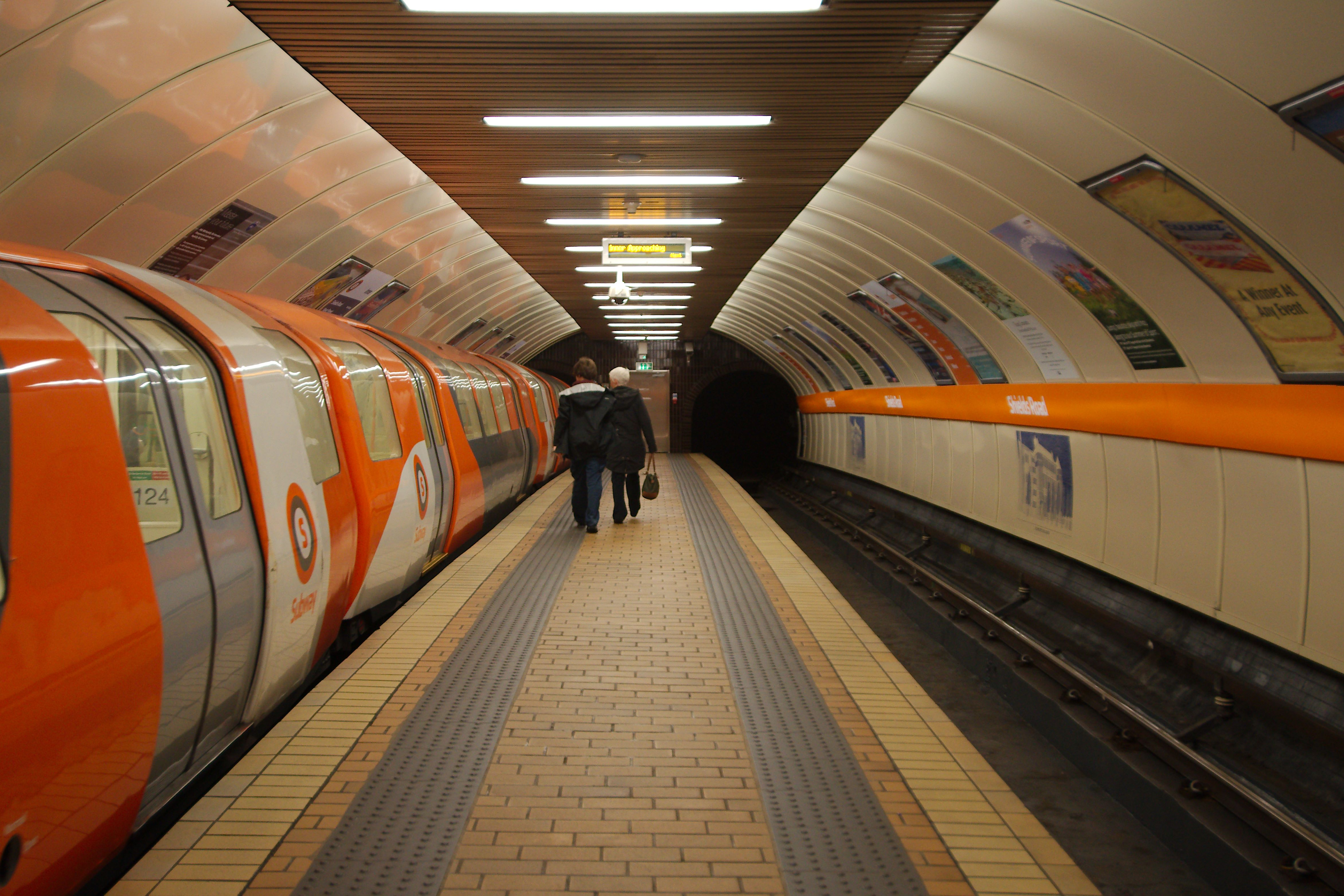

General information
- Location: 30 Cornwall Street; Kingston, Glasgow, G41 1AH; Scotland
- Coordinates: 55°51′01″N 4°16′28″W
- Operator: SPT
- Transit authority: SPT
- Platforms: 2 (island platform)
- Tracks: 2

Construction
- Structure type: Underground
- Parking: Yes; 839 parking spaces
- Cycle facilities: Yes (bike hire and parking)
- Accessible: No

Other information
- Fare zone: 1

History
- Opened: 14 December 1896
- Rebuilt: 16 April 1980; 46 years ago

Passengers
- 2018: ▲0.496 million
- 2019: ▲0.511 million
- 2020: ▼0.172 million
- 2021: ▲0.195 million
- 2022: ▲0.383 million

Services
Preceding station	SPT	Following station
West Street anticlockwise / inner circle	Glasgow Subway	Kinning Park clockwise / outer circle
Location
Notes
- Passenger statistics provided are gate entries only. Information on gate exits for patronage is incomplete, and thus not included.

Shields Road subway station (Scottish Gaelic: Rathad Shields) is a station of Glasgow Subway, serving the Pollokshields and Kingston areas of Glasgow, Scotland. Nearby is Charles Rennie Mackintosh's Scotland Street School Museum. This was one of four (now three) stations which has Park and Ride facilities.

The station has been left in an industrial area by post-war reconstruction and is isolated from surrounding areas by the M8 motorway and approach roads for the Kingston Bridge. There were 460,000 passengers in the 12 months to 31 March 2005. These trips were largely generated by the adjacent 'Park & Ride' car park. The car park was rebuilt with over 800 spaces in a project that ended in September 2006.

The east end of the car park is closer to the entrance of West Street subway station.

The station is actually on Scotland Street, not Shields Road. There has been some consideration of changing its name.

Shields Road is one of the stations mentioned in Cliff Hanley's song The Glasgow Underground.

== Past passenger numbers ==
- 2004/05: 0.460 million annually
- 2011/12: 0.457 million annually

== Gallery ==
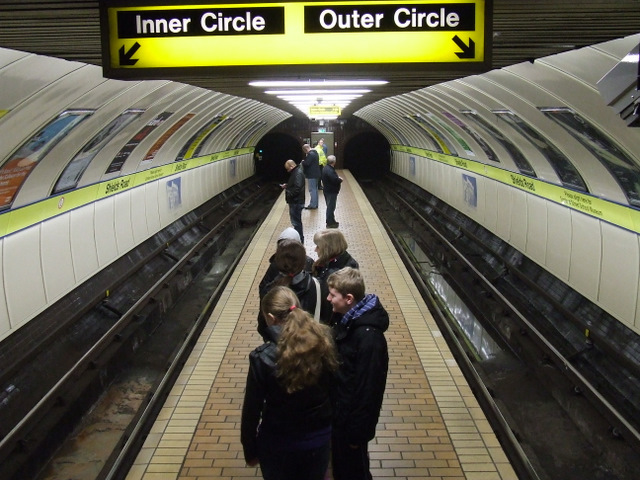
Platforms

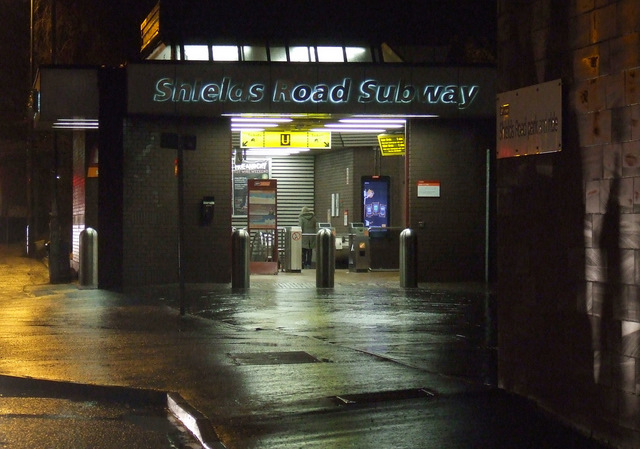
Station exterior prior to refurbishment

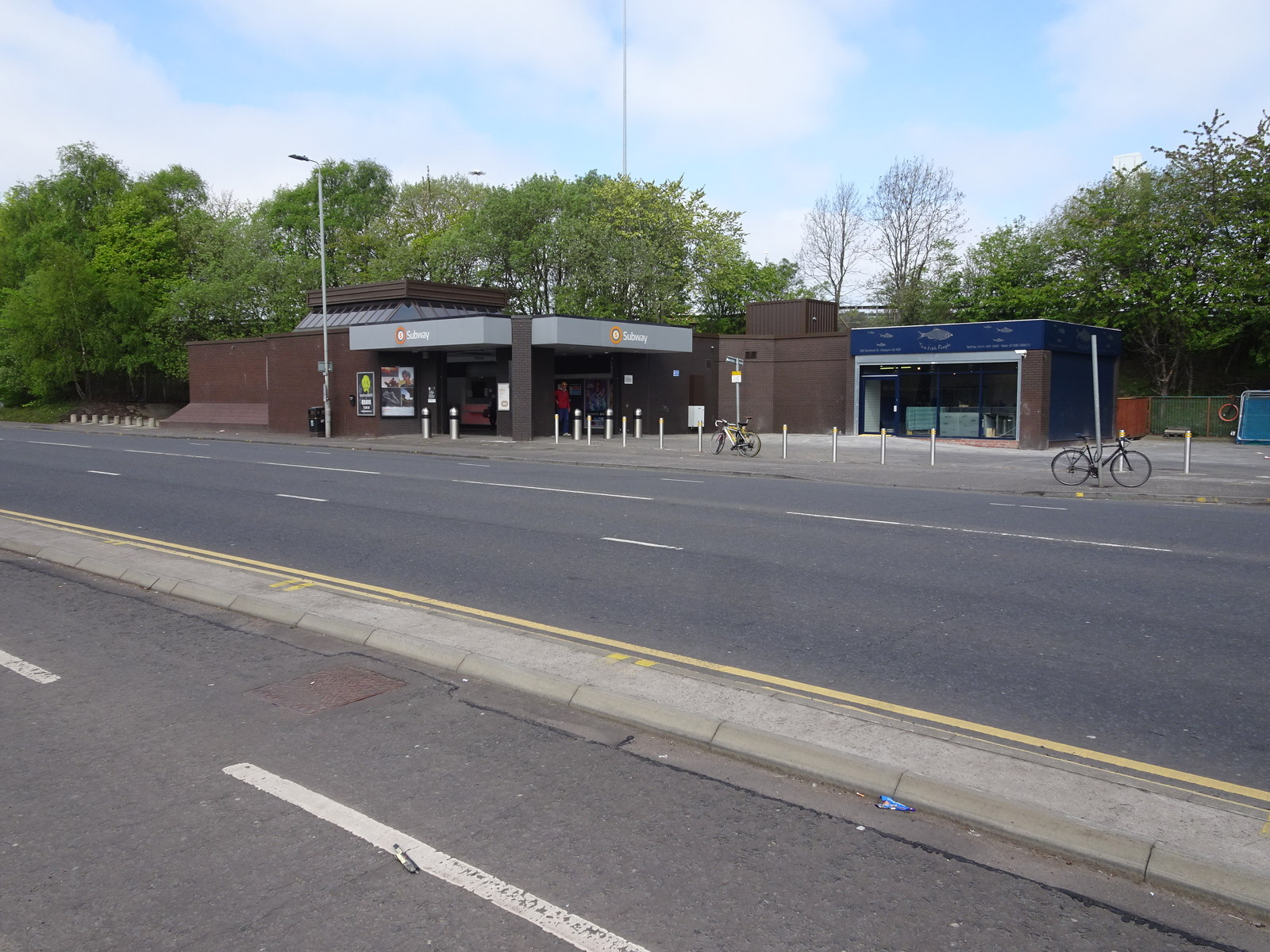
Station exterior

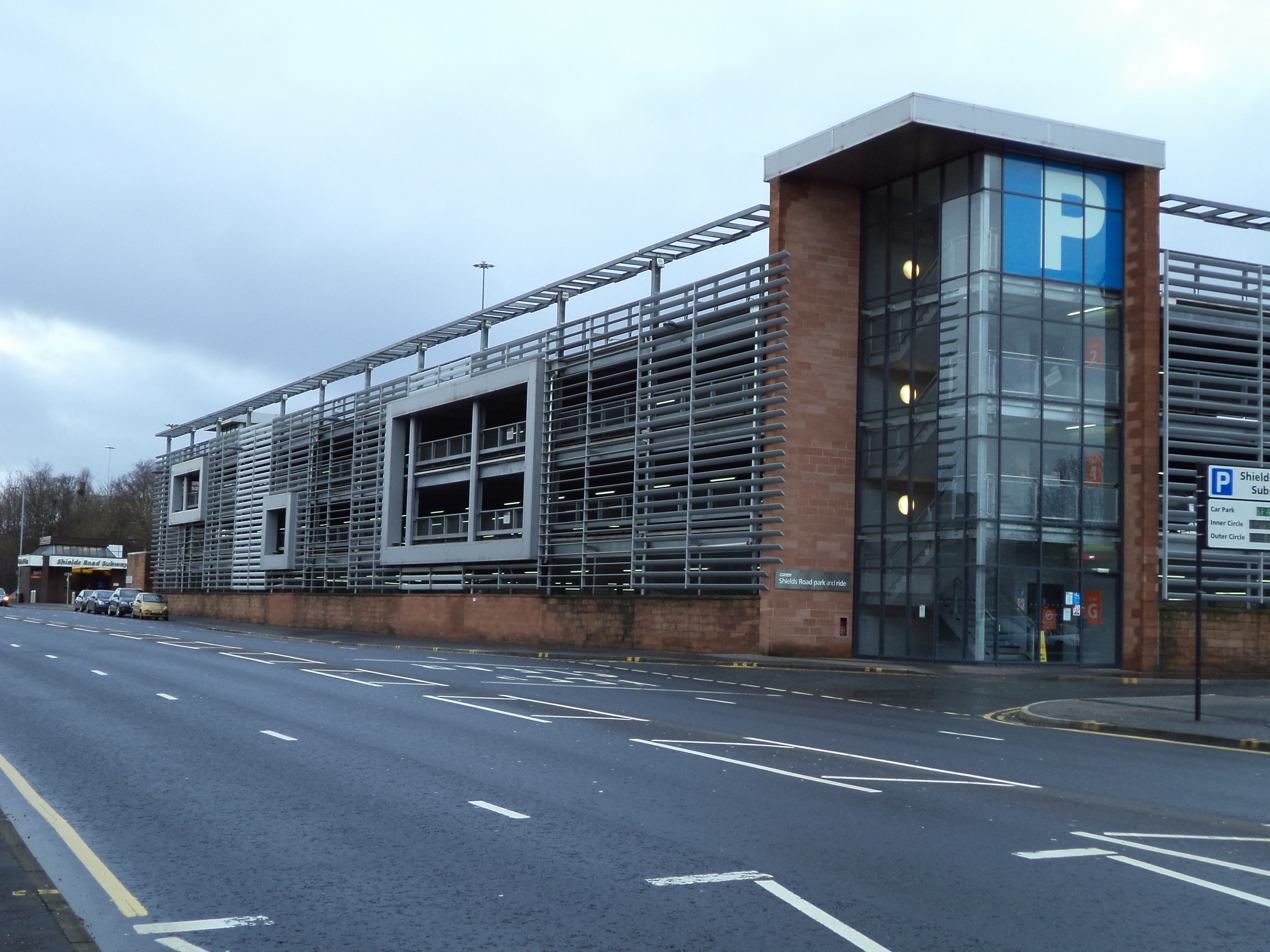
Park and ride building
