= Henry Munro Cautley =

Architect based in Ipswich

- Born: 1876; Kent, United Kingdom
- Died: 1959; Ipswich
- Burial place: St Mary Magdalene, Westerfield, Ipswich
- Other names: Munro Cautley, Cautley
- Years active: Early 20th Century
- Known for: Architecture, Diocesan architect for the Anglican Diocese of St Edmundsbury and Ipswich

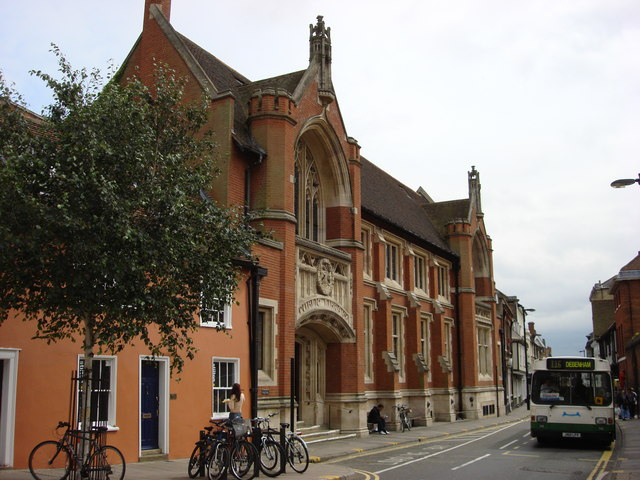
Ipswich Public Library by Cautley (1924), a Grade II listed building since 1977.

Henry Munro Cautley (1876–1959) was an architect based in Ipswich.

Cautley, was born at Bridge, Kent in 1876, the son of Richard Hutton Cautley and Annie Munro Inchbald. When Henry was very young the family moved to Ipswich where Richard was appointed Curate-in-Charge for the new All Saints church in Chevalier Street.

Henry attended the Architectural Association School and was articled to, and later assisted, Edward Fernley Bisshopp between 1891 and 1897. He then went on to be assistant to Durward Browne between 1897 and 1898 and Horace Field between 1898 and 1901, becoming an ARIBA in 1901. He partnered with Leslie Barefoot establishing the architectural firm of Cautley and Barefoot.

Cautley was the Diocesan architect for the Anglican Diocese of St Edmundsbury and Ipswich and his new architectural work included several churches in the locality of Ipswich, the shopping area "The Walk", The Grade II listed Ipswich Public Library, several banks, as well as his own home "Drumbeg"; Which alongside "The Walk", is an excellent example of his work in the "Tudorbethan" architectural style.

He is remembered for his books, particularly on the ecclesiastical architecture of East Anglia; Royal Arms and Commandments in Our Churches was published in 1934, Suffolk Churches and Their Treasures was published in 1937, and Norfolk Churches in 1949. His papers and collection of glass plate negatives related to his publications is held by the Suffolk Record Office.

== Publications ==
- 1937: Suffolk Churches and Their Treasures Ipswich Norman Adlard (second edition 1938, third edition 1954)
- 1949: Norfolk Churches Woodbridge: The Boydell Press
- 1950: One Hundred Years of Service 1850 - 1950. A brief History of the Ipswich Permanent Benefit Building Society Ipswich: W. S. Cowell
