= Coldside Library =

Public Carnegie library in Scotland

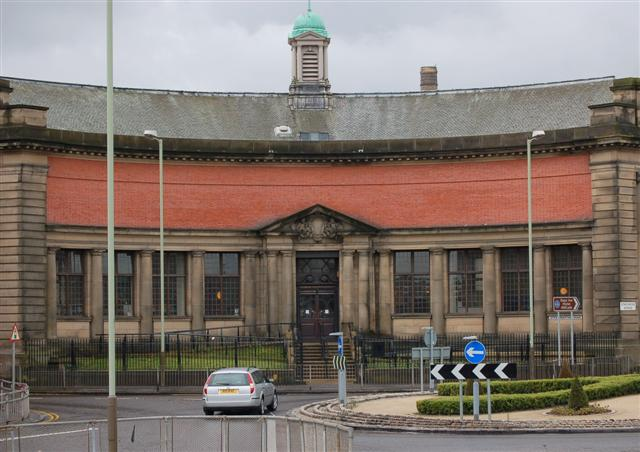
- Interactive map of the Coldside Library area

General information
- Status: Category A listed building
- Type: Public library, Carnegie library
- Architectural style: Edwardian baroque
- Location: 150 Strathmartine Road, DD3 7SE, Dundee, Scotland, United Kingdom
- Coordinates: 56°28′30″N 2°58′50″W
- Construction started: 1906
- Opened: 22 October 1908
- Cost: £7,200

Design and construction
- Architect: James Thomson Frank Drummond Thomson William Carless

Website
- www.leisureandculturedundee.com/coldside-community-library

Coldside Library is a community library operated by Leisure and Culture Dundee. Its opening hours run from Monday to Saturday weekly. It offers book borrowing services, free Wi-Fi and computers for internet access, as well as educational activities for families and adults in the Dundee area. The library was one of five Carnegie libraries commissioned in 1901 for the City of Dundee. The library was designed in 1906 by city architect James Thomson as one of the first two projects undertaken after his appointment to the post in 1904. Coldside library is one of the first free libraries in Dundee and has continued to operate as a public library to this day. Towards the end of the 1940s, Coldside Library also hosted the Dundee studio for BBC Radio Scotland.

== History ==
The Coldside Library was first proposed by Dundee Town Council in 1901, who approached philanthropist Andrew Carnegie and asked him to provide funds for five new libraries (Arthurstone, Blackness, Blackscroft, Broughty Ferry and Coldside). Up until that point, Dundee was served by subscription libraries, with a two-tier borrowing system, where new books were reserved for those who could afford the cost of a yearly subscription, whereas working-class people had to wait a year before being able to access those collections free of charge. The new Carnegie libraries gave all library users free access to their collections regardless of their means.

The Coldside Library was awarded £7,200 by Andrew Carnegie. That sum, however, was to cover the cost of the building only and the site upon which it was built was gifted separately by the former Lord Provost of Dundee Charles Barrie, to serve the Northern Dundee area. Charles Barrie was born in Coldside and the property he gifted was part of his family's property in that area.

=== Usage by the BBC ===
In 1948, the Provost of Dundee Archibald Powrie took the occasion of the opening of the BBC at Work exhibition in Dundee to make a bid to encourage greater diversity of the BBC radio broadcasting by recommending they host a local studio in Dundee. Powrie argued that it was easier to encourage greater participation through a local studio. There had previously been a studio hosted in Dundee at Lochee Road and Sir Wilson Garnett, member of the Scottish Advisory Council on Broadcasting, agreed to support Powrie's proposal with a memorandum drafted with other members of the council.

The proposal was accepted by the BBC in 1949, who agreed to set up an outside broadcasting point in Dundee's Coldside Library branch. The use of a room from the library for that purpose was agreed by the Dundee Public Library Finance Committee with the view of supporting one broadcast a week along with occasional rehearsals and test sessions. The broadcasting facilities continued operating until the 1970s.

=== 2019 renovation ===
From 4 March 2019, the Coldside Library closed for six months during extensive user building accessibility renovations. The plans received approval from Historic Environment Scotland and the total budget costing £716,000. The plans included the addition of new features to improve disabled access such as a lower front desk, accessible toilets with baby changing facilities and the installation of a lift to give access to the upper floor of the building. A new meeting room for employability services was built and improved lighting system was installed throughout the building.

== Architecture ==
The Coldside Library project was awarded to James Thomson in 1906 after he took over the post of Dundee City Architect, following the death of William Alexander in 1904. At that point in time, Thomson only had his own office, with no municipal staff to support him, so he enlisted help from his son Frank Drummond Thomson and his assistant William Carless (sometimes spelled Careless). Frank Thomson produced the drawings for the design of the Coldside Library and also used his contacts to engage Albert Hodge to carry out all the sculpture work.

The building was completed and opened its doors on 22 October 1908. The style of the building is described as Edwardian Baroque, with a long concave front façade topped by a section of red bricks. It has two decorative gables at either end of the building, one at the Strathmartin Road side and one at Strathmore Avenue (previously known as Loons Road). The building is now listed as one of Scotland's Category A buildings.
