= James Robert Rhind =

James Robert Rhind, architect, was born in Inverness, Scotland in 1854 and trained as an architect in his father's local practice.

He was successful in the architectural competition for new libraries to be constructed in Glasgow following Andrew Carnegie’s gift of £100,000 to the city in 1901. His designs were selected for 7 libraries, allowing him to demonstrate his individual interpretation of Edwardian Baroque architecture.

Rhind’s libraries were all built with locally quarried sandstone, which blended in with the existing tenement neighbourhoods. His landmark buildings were greatly enhanced by his liberal use of columns, domes and sculpted features. Many of the façades were decorated with stone and bronze statues by the noted Glasgow sculptor, William Kellock Brown.

Rhind retained his base in Inverness while he temporarily occupied offices in Glasgow city centre during the construction of the new Carnegie libraries. In Scotland the Carnegie libraries were typically built of stone. In the rest of the British Isles there was much more use of brick. The drawings of the Carnegie libraries designed by architect James Robert Rhind are in the Strathclyde Archives, Glasgow.

== Works ==
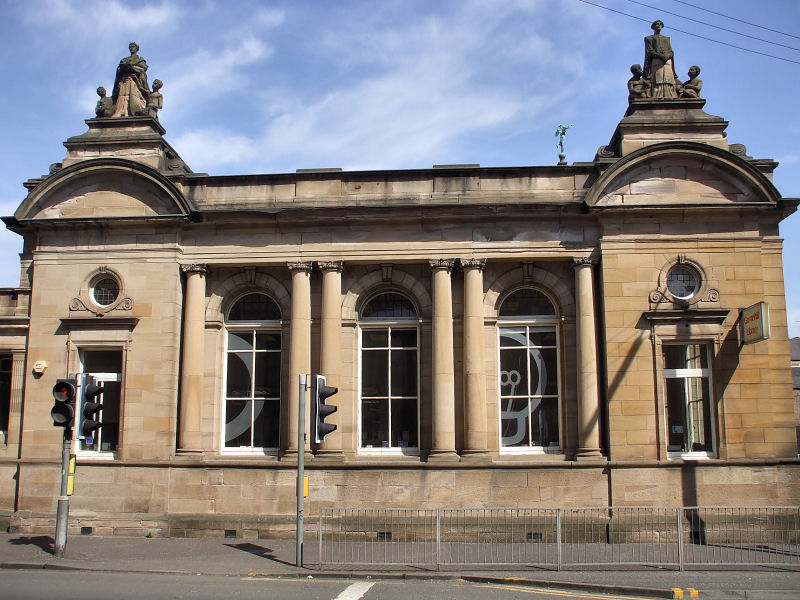
Calder Street frontage of Govanhill Library

- Bridgeton District Library, 1903-1906
- Dennistoun Library, 1903-1906
- Govanhill & Crosshill District Library, 1902-1906
- Hutchesontown District Library, 1904-1906
- Maryhill Public Library, 1903-1905
- Parkhead District Library, 1904-1906
- Woodside Library, 1902-1905

Rhind's best known buildings in the north of Scotland are the Royal Golf Hotel, Dornoch and the Crown Church, Inverness.
