= Kingston Halls =

Municipal building in Kingston, Scotland

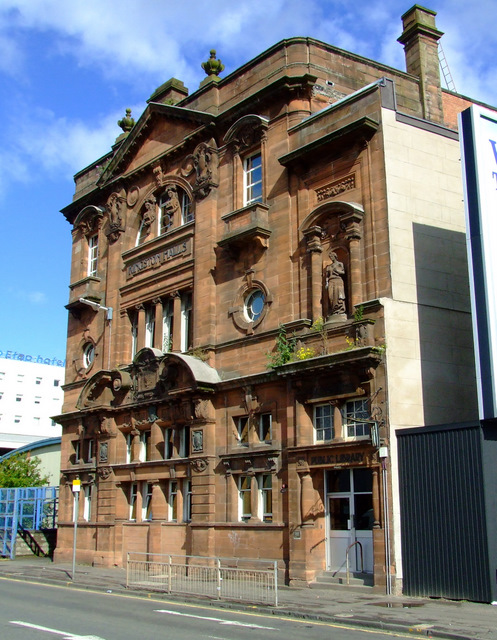
- Kingston Halls

- Shown in Glasgow
- 55.8539°N 4.2743°W
- Location: Paisley Road, Glasgow

History
- Built: 1904

Site notes
- Architect: Robert William Horn
- Architectural style: Edwardian Baroque style

Listed Building – Category B
- Official name: Kingston Halls, 330-346 Paisley Road, Glasgow
- Designated: 17 June 1986
- Reference no.: LB33524

Kingston Halls is a municipal structure in Paisley Road in the Kingston area of Glasgow, Scotland. The building is now used as the headquarters of the Talbot Association, a charity which provides accommodation and support to homeless people, and is a Category B listed building.

== History ==
Following significant population growth, largely associated with the local dockside activities, the Glasgow Corporation decided, in the early 20th century, that the Kingston area should have a municipal building incorporating a hall for community events, a public library, and a police station. This was made possible by a significant donation from the Scottish-American businessman, Andrew Carnegie. The site they selected was on the north side of Paisley Road in what was then the dockside area.

The new building was designed by Robert William Horn under the supervision of the City Engineer, A. B. McDonald in the Edwardian Baroque style, built in red sandstone and was officially opened by the Lord Provost of Glasgow, Sir John Ure Primrose, on 8 September 1904.

The design involved an asymmetrical main frontage of four bays facing Paisley Road. The second bay from the left featured a pair of doorways flanked by squat Doric order columns on the ground floor and four small windows, separated by narrow columns, on the mezzanine floor. These windows were flanked by pilasters and brackets supporting a large segmental pediment containing a panel carved with the city crest. On the first floor there were four more windows separated by Ionic order columns supporting an entablature and a frieze inscribed with the words "Kingston Halls", and on the second floor there was a Diocletian window. The bay was flanked by full-height pilasters supporting a modillioned pediment. The first and third bays from the left were fenestrated by bipartite windows on the ground floor and on the mezzanine floor, by oculi on the first floor and by single windows with balconies on the second floor. The right-hand bay featured a doorway leading to the library on the ground floor, a bipartite window on the mezzanine floor, and a niche containing statue of a female "figure of learning" on the first floor. The statue and the other carvings on the face of the building were sculpted by Richard Ferris. Internally, the principal rooms were the public library and a small assembly hall on the ground floor and a large assembly hall on the first floor. This was the first Carnegie library to be opened in Glasgow.

The structure was badly damaged in a large fire in 1948 and, following refurbishment, eventually re-opened in 1957. The main entrance lobby leading to the assembly halls was blocked off and the two doorways were replaced by four small windows. The area developed a significant immigrant community in the 1950s and the former president of the UN General Assembly, Sir Muhammad Zafarullah Khan, attended the Pakistan Independence Day celebrations in the building in August 1965. The halls were subsequently the scene of some racial and political tension. In May 1974, the National Front politician, John Hughes, led a parade outside the building seeking to provoke picketing workers and, in the following year, a demonstration by trade unionists against fascism led to a skirmish known locally as the "Kingston Halls Police Riot": trade unionists claimed that they were "arrested and beaten" by the police.

In the early 1970s, the building was also the venue for the annual solo bagpipe competition organised by the Glasgow Uist and Barra Association. The building closed as an events venue in 1981, and subsequently became the offices of the Talbot Association, a charity established by Vincent Buchanan to provide accommodation and support to homeless people. The association established beds for some 60 homeless people in the building.

== See also ==
- List of listed buildings in Glasgow/10
