= Ballyhahill =

Village in County Limerick, Ireland

Ballyhahill Baile Dhá Thuile or Baile Uí Sháithil
- Village
- Location in Ireland
- Coordinates: 52°33′35″N 9°11′38″W
- Country: Ireland
- Province: Munster
- County: County Limerick

Population (2016)
  - Total: 146
- Time zone: UTC+0 (WET)
  - Summer (DST): UTC-1 (IST (WEST))
- Irish Grid Reference: R191460

Ballyhahill (Irish: Baile Dhá Thuile or Baile Uí Sháithil) is a village and townland in County Limerick, Ireland. As of the 2016 census, the village had a population of 146 people. It is 40 km west of Limerick city. The White River flows to the east of the village.

== Name ==
According to the Placenames Database of Ireland, two Irish language derivations of the village name are proposed: Baile Dhá Thuile ("town of two floods") or Baile Uí Sháithil ("town of Ó Sáithil"). The former (Baile Dhá Thuile) has official recognition and appears on road signage around Ballyhahill.

== History ==
Evidence of ancient settlement in the area includes a number of ringfort sites in the townland of Ballyhahill and the neighbouring townlands of Mohernagh and Finnoo. A Carnegie library was built in Ballyhahill c. 1907. The local national (primary) school, Scoil Naomh Mhuire, was built in 1959. As of 2017, the school had 39 pupils enrolled.
