= Ipswich County Library =

Listed building in Suffolk, England

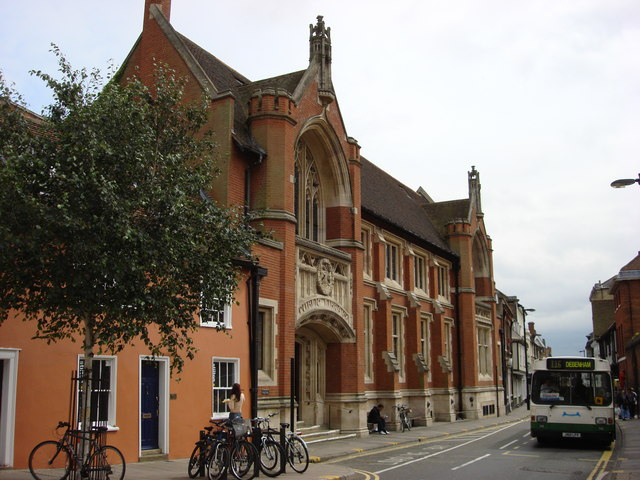
- Interactive map of the Ipswich County Library area
- Alternative names: Ipswich Public Library, Ipswich Library

General information
- Location: Ipswich, Suffolk
- Coordinates: 52.0586792°N 1.1516791°E
- Year built: February 1921
- Opened: 3 September 1924
- Owner: Suffolk County Council

Design and construction
- Architect: Henry Munro Cautley

Listed Building – Grade II
- Official name: Ipswich Public Library
- Designated: 15 December 1977
- Reference no.: 1236725

Ipswich County Library is a Grade II Listed building in Ipswich, Suffolk. The building still serves as a public library as part of the Suffolk Libraries service.

== History ==
The building was designed by notable Ipswich architect, Henry Munro Cautley. Construction began in February 1921, and was officially opened to the public on the 3rd September 1924.

The site of the building, and some of the funding for its construction, was donated by Alderman William Paul. The remaining funding was provided by the Carnegie Trust, who granted £22,500 towards construction in 1917.

The Library was refurbished by Suffolk County Council in 1994.

== Architectural significance ==
The building is a mixture of Tudor and Gothic revival architectural styles. One of the most significant features being the 100ft long Northgate Room, which serves as the library’s reference room, and contains several coloured glass windows which depict famous historic figures.
