= Bob Widdowson =

English footballer

Personal information
- Full name: John Robert Widdowson
- Date of birth: 12 September 1941 (age 85)
- Place of birth: Loughborough, Leicestershire, England
- Height: 6 ft 0 in (1.83 m)
- Position: Goalkeeper

Youth career
- –1959: British Ropes

Senior career*
Years	Team	Apps	(Gls)
1959–1968	Sheffield United	7	(0)
1968–1970	York City	30	(0)
1969	→ Portsmouth (loan)	4	(0)
1970–	Gainsborough Trinity		
Total		41	(0)
- * Club domestic league appearances and goals

John Robert Widdowson (born 12 September 1941) is an English former professional footballer who played as a goalkeeper in the Football League for Sheffield United, York City and Portsmouth and in non-League football for British Ropes and Gainsborough Trinity.
