= Rutherglen Castle =

Coordinates: 55.82889°N 4.21276°W

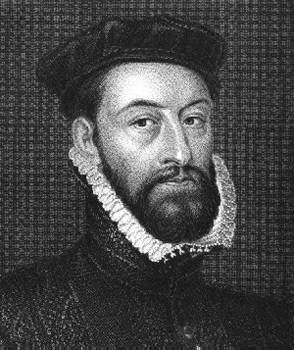
James Stewart, 1st Earl of Moray ordered the castle's destruction

Rutherglen Castle was located where Castle Street meets King Street in Rutherglen, Scotland. It was a large and important castle, having been built in the 13th century; the walls were reportedly 5 feet thick.

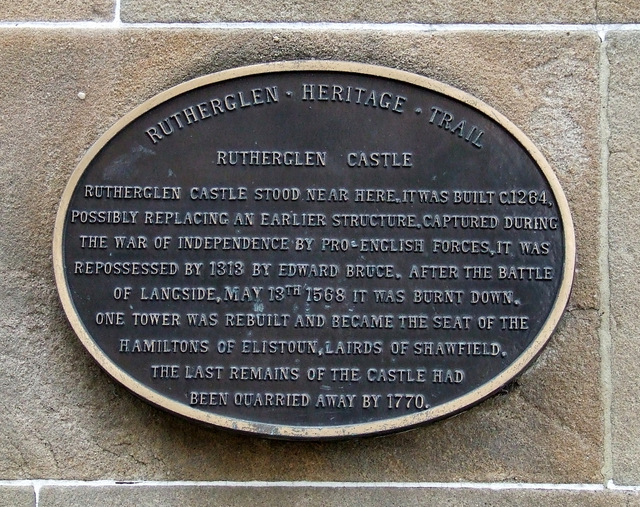
Plaque on a tenement built on the approximate location of the castle

The castle fell under the control of the English during the First War of Scottish Independence and was later besieged several times by Robert The Bruce. It was eventually retaken by his brother Edward Bruce and Sir James Douglas but was spared destruction, unlike so many of the other castles recaptured from the English. However, the castle was burned to the ground by James Stewart, 1st Earl of Moray, in 1569, in retribution against the Hamiltons of Shawfield for having supported Mary, Queen of Scots, at the Battle of Langside.

== See also ==
- Farme Castle
- Castlemilk House
