= Bridon Ropes =

British manufacturer of wire ropes

- Trade name: Bridon Ropes
- Formerly: British Ropes
- Company type: Public
- Industry: wire rope manufacturer
- Founded: 1924
- Headquarters: Doncaster, South Yorkshire

Bridon Ropes, also known as Bridon International Ltd is a manufacturing company in Doncaster in South Yorkshire that makes wire rope. It is now part of the Belgium-based Bekaert company. The name Bridon originates from the concatenation or contraction of the words British and Doncaster; it is not a family name.

== History ==
The company can trace its history in Doncaster back to 1789.

It was formed in 1924 as British Ropes Limited. British Ropes Ltd was headquartered at 32 Cavendish Square. British Ropes was state-owned. From the 1960s to 1980s, British Ropes headquarters was at Warmsworth Hall at Warmsworth, off the A630 near the B6376 junction.

In 1974 it became known as Bridon; Bridon was the name of one of their brands of wire rope. In 1976 the company was turning over £243 million. In 1978 the company was registered on the Stock Exchange. Bridon and British Steel jointly owned the large Templeborough Rolling Mills; this is now the Magna Science Adventure Centre; 40% of Templeborough's production went to Bridon.

In 1991 its workforce was 5,400 which dropped to 4,000 at the end of 1993, and produced in 20 countries with 76 service centres; it was the world's biggest supplier of wire rope. In April 1993 it won a Queen's Award for Technological Achievement for its Brifen fencing.

Prince Andrew, Duke of York visited the site on 20 October 2011.

=== Ownership ===
In 1997 it was bought by FKI, who were bought by Melrose Industries in 2008. In 2014 it was bought by the Ontario Teachers' Pension Plan for £365 million. In December 2015 it merged with the Belgium wire rope company NV Bekaert SA.

== Structure ==
It is headquartered in the south-west of Doncaster. It makes wire rope at four sites in the UK, and in Germany and the USA.

== Products ==
It makes wire rope for bridges, cranes, elevators and mine shafts. It claims to be the only company in the world that makes wire rope from hot rolled steel. A brand of its wire rope is called Dyform; Dyform was introduced in the late 1960s as a seven-wire tendon for prestressed concrete construction.

Their wire rope has been made widespread for prestressed concrete bridges; the BRIDON brand is found on many prestressed concrete bridges around the world.

== See also ==
- British Insulated Callender's Cables
- Prysmian Group
- British Ropes F.C.
- Bridon Ropes F.C.
