= Farme Castle =

Castle in South Lanarkshire, Scotland

Coordinates: 55°50′06″N 4°12′17″W

Farme Castle was located in Rutherglen, to the south-east of Glasgow, Scotland. It stood 0.5 miles (0.80 km) east of Farme Cross where the A724 meets the A749 trunk road. The castle keep acted as one corner of a courtyard, formed by an extension in the form of a castellated mansion. High walls and subsidiary buildings completed the courtyard. There was an ornate arched gateway to the courtyard adjacent to the keep. The old keep was of three storeys and a garret, above a corbelled-out parapet with machicolations and water spouts.

An old ceiling was removed in 1792 to reveal an ancient wooden ceiling, which carried writing alluding to the Stewarts, and the date was 1325; in the 2010s, part of the text was reproduced on stone as a public art installation at Cuningar Loop, a recently opened public park a short distance to the north of the site of the castle.

The castle was a simple keep of the 15th century, possibly built on an older core. Robert the Bruce had granted the Farme Castle estate to Walter The Steward. The estate later passed to the Douglases. From 1482 to 1599 it belonged to the Crawfords, and became known as Crawford's Farme. It was demolished in the 1960s, by which time it was being used as a repository for redundant mining equipment. An industrial estate bearing the same name now occupies the site.

== See also ==
- Rutherglen Castle
- Castlemilk House

== Bibliography ==
- Mason, Gordon. (2000) The Castles of Glasgow and the Clyde. Goblinshead. ISBN 1-899874-18-6
- Historic Environment Scotland. "Glasgow, Dalmarnock, Baronald Street, Farme Castle (Site no. NS66SW 22)".
