= Plumstead Challenge Cup =

The Plumstead Challenge Cup is a Cup Competition administered by the Woolwich and Eltham Sunday Football Alliance in South East London. It is affiliated to the London Football Association. The competition is open to all Sunday football sides, (subject to location rules) for an entry fee of £20, as long as their parent league agrees. All of the money raised by the competition goes towards local charities, with the Bexley and Greenwich Community Hospice being the main beneficiary. In season 2015/16 teams from the Croydon Municipal Sunday League, The Hackney & Leyton Football League and the London & Kent Suburban League all competed alongside Woolwich & Eltham Sunday Football Alliance sides to win the historic cup.

== History ==
- 1930-1931 – Danson Athletic Reserves
- 1931-1932 – Danson Athletic Reserves
- 1932-1933 – East Ham Argyle
- 1933-1934 – Westmount
- 1935-1948 – Not played for
- 1949-1950 – Erith Baptist
- 1950-1951 – Greenwich United
- 1951-1952 – R.O.F Minors
- 1952-1953 – Greenfield Sports
- 1953-1954 – Greenfield Sports
- 1954-1955 – R.O.F Minors
- 1955-1956 – Unknown
- 1956-1957 – Unknown
- 1957-1958 – The Robins
- 1958-1959 – Mottingham Wanderers
- 1959-1967 – Unknown

1967-1968 – British Ropes

1968-1969 – British Ropes

1969-1970 – Verdun Rovers

1970-1971 – Palmerston United & Verdun Rovers (shared)

1971-1972 – R.E.M.E

1972-1973 – Palmerston United

1973-1974 – Rowbeck Argyle

1974-1975 – Verdun FC

1975-1976 – Eltham Hill FC

1976-1977 – New Thames Valley FC

1977-1978 – Royals FC

1978-1979 – New Thames Valley (1st)

1979-1980 – Convoys

1980-1981 – Hillcrest FC

1981-1982 – Lewisham Way

1982-1983 – Lewisham Way

1983-1984 – Kenningwell

1984-1985 – Kidbrooke Lions

1985-1986 – Kross Keys FC

1986-1987 – Kross Keys FC

1987-1988 – Teviot Rangers

1988-1989 – Teviot Rangers

1989-1990 – Teviot Rangers

1990-1991 – Limestone FC

1991-1992 – Lenas

1992-1993 – Moves

1993-1994 – Unknown

1994-1995 – Thamesmead Town FC

1995-1996 – Springhill United ‘A’

1996-1997 – Springhill United ‘A’

1997-1998 – Brentons

1998-1999 – South East 94

1999-2000 – Brentons

2000-2001 – Withheld

2001-2002 – Westminster Arms

2002-2003 – Polyweights ‘A’

2003-2004 – Sabanoh 97

2004-2005 – Red Star Northfield

2005-2006 – Charlton United

2006-2007 – Mottingham Village

2007-2008 – Lounge FC

2008-2009 – Charlton United

2009-2010 – New Abbey

2010-2011 – Sabanoh 97

2011-2012 – Springhill United

2012-2013 – FC Elmstead Reserves

2013-2014 – Thames Borough

2014-2015 – Sabanoh 97

2015-2016 - Junior Reds Seniors

2016-2017 - Long Lane B

2017-2018 - Bayswater RK

2018-2019 - Welling Town Sunday A

2019-2020 - (Cancelled due to COVID-19)

2020-2021 - (Cancelled due to COVID-19)

2021-2022 - Under The Radar FC

2022-2023 - SE Dons Football Club
