= Rutherglen =

Town in South Lanarkshire, Scotland

Coordinates: 55.828°N 4.214°W

Rutherglen: Scottish Gaelic: An Ruadh Ghleann; Scots: Ruglen / Ruggy
- Town
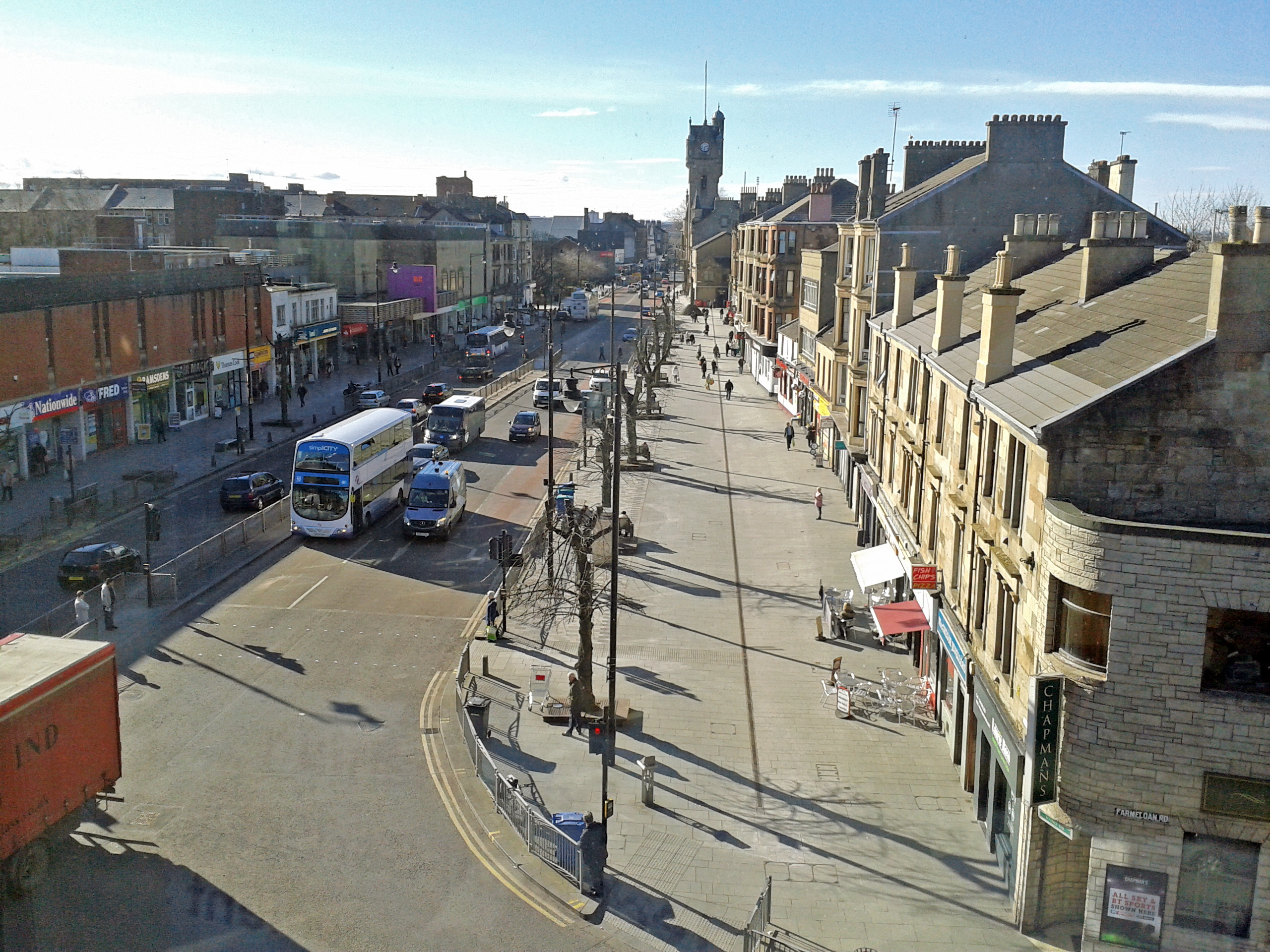
- Main Street, the main shopping area of Rutherglen (in 2016)

- Location within Scotland Rutherglen (Scotland)
- Population: 30,950 (2020)
- OS grid reference: NS614616
- Lieutenancy area: Lanarkshire
- Country: Scotland
- Sovereign state: United Kingdom
- Post town: GLASGOW
- Postcode district: G73
- Dialling code: 0141
- Police: Scotland
- Fire: Scottish
- Ambulance: Scottish
- UK Parliament: Rutherglen
- Scottish Parliament: Rutherglen

Rutherglen (/ˈrʌðərɡlɪn/; Scots: Ruglen, Scottish Gaelic: An Ruadh-Ghleann) is a town in South Lanarkshire, Scotland, immediately south-east of Glasgow, three miles (five kilometres) from the city. The town is directly south of the River Clyde. Having previously existed as a separate Lanarkshire burgh, in 1975 Rutherglen lost its own local council and administratively became a component of the City of Glasgow District within the Strathclyde region (along with neighbouring Cambuslang). In 1996 the towns were reallocated to the South Lanarkshire council area.

== Etymology ==
The name of Rutherglen, as well as the Scots derivation of it, Ruglen, is perhaps from Scottish Gaelic An Ruadh-Ghleann 'the red valley'; however, it may have derived from an old Welsh dialect or Cumbric, referring to "the plain of Rydderch" – Rydderch who was a famous ruler associated with the Alt Clut kingdom of the Early Medieval period, which centred on Dumbarton Rock. In this sense, the element Glen would represent a form of the Welsh glyn, for a plain. Shearer, in his 1926 history of the area, drew attention to the lack of a prominent valley landform at Rutherglen, but the fact it occupies a notable plain – in this case, one situated upon a large ridgeline above the River Clyde. The references to elements meaning red, may refer to the reddish sandy soil that comprises much of the ridgeline there leading down to the Clyde.

Antiquarian sources such as D. Ure (1793) have proposed that the place-name pertains to Reuther, one of the legendary kings of Scotland during the pre-Roman era. However, as most scholarship rejects the existence of this ruler, and as his alleged territory was in Dalriada, not Strathclyde, and as 'Rutherglen' was surely coined during the later period of known dominance of Gaelic language, this etymology has little credibility.

Cyclic issues with district place-name research is evidenced in several local history works, including the notable 1926 work by Shearer:

"Etymologists, like doctors, will continue to disagree, and it might be possible to write a whole chapter on the placename, Rutherglen, without consulting a single authority, and come as near to the correct interpretation as many of those who have argued the point across every conceivable hypothesis, and, as conjecture alone must be the ultimate of all endeavour to trace the origin of our good town's name, we shall refrain from wasting the reader's time by prolonging the discussion. Suffice it to say that, of the half-dozen derivations propounded by Ure, Chalmers, Hately Waddell, Johnston, etc., the theory that Rutherglen acquired its name by reason of its topographical features will, we think, have readiest acceptance."

== History ==
By tradition, Rutherglen is said to have received its Royal Burgh status in 1126 by a Royal Charter from King David I of Scotland, who reigned from 1124 to 1153.

However, a factual analysis of the state of knowledge, would conclude that there is no evidence that David I granted Royal Burgh status, nor granted it by a charter. That David I did probably grant Rutherglen some trading or even burghal status, is evidence by a William I charter granted sometime during the period 1179-1189. Thus, the only tenable conclusion is that sometime during David I's reign (1124-1153) he granted some form of privileges to Rutherglen, but not necessarily in 1126. Indeed, had such a royal burgh charter been granted for Rutherglen by David I, then the William I renewal of Rutherglen's status should proceed in standardised terms of ratifying any earlier charter, but instead it was worded to grant it anew, in greater solemnity with burghal status, and not only to embody it in a charter but also to identify its jurisdictional marches, which would be an unnecessary step if the charter had been intended to represent a ratification or renewal of any previous charter of erection. Important in this regard is the phrasing evidenced in the William I charter - et hac carta mea confirmasse. Thus, the William I charter implicitly represents the granting of a new status and it even contains a description of the trading boundary to flesh out the nature of this status. It has been well demonstrated that as none of Scotland’s Royal Burghs have documented evidence of charters from the period of David I, then they were all erected purely by word-of-mouth, without any charter. Generally, it has been believed that charters for such burghs were avoided because they all shared a sort of common constitution enshrined in Leges Burgorum, and so the only step the king had to take for new burghs, was simply to declare that locality was part of a longer list.

The sole origin of the relatively modern claim that Rutherglen was founded as a royal burgh in 1126, is traceable to a Scottish Parliamentary Roll entry dated 30 May 1661. This proceeds upon a supplication to the Parliament, made by a burghal clerk on behalf of the Provost, Baillies and Council of Rutherglen, claiming that the town was erected a ‘frie burgh by King David in the yeer 1126’. This supplication involved the Burgh’s plea for permission to increase their number of fairs in order to compete with the greater competition of the adjacent Royal Burgh of Glasgow. Their ‘antient Royall burgh’ of Rutherglen, they contended, was falling into decay and ruin as a consequence of Glasgow’s attraction. The clerk, in stating the alleged foundation year of 1126, lent no support to the supplication. In this context it appears like an overstatement to try and achieve a goal. Of course, the concept of a ‘free burgh’ undermines the authority further still because such a grant classification did not exist until 1200, and even then only in England. Problems like these can be deliberate or accidental, but in the latter exists the possibility that the year of founding was misdated, as was quite common at that time. Indeed, in two confirmation charters for Lanark’s Royal Burgh in the 1500s and 1600s make reference to the wrong king in terms of the period in which the charter was granted. As such, the claim of 1126 as the burgh's foundation date, is not only very late attested, but is also expressed in a context of agendas and commonplace historiographical mistakes. As such, there is no evidence that Rutherglen received Royal Burgh status in 1126, just that it received some form of trading rights sometime during David I's reign, and probably not by means of a charter. 1126 remains possible, but there is no evidence to encourage its likelihood.

Rutherglen Royal Burgh gradually diminished in importance as neighbouring Glasgow grew in power and size, although the establishment of other Royal Burghs at Ayr, Dumbarton, and indeed Lanark, may have contributed to this decline. By tradition, the masons who built Glasgow Cathedral are said to have lodged in Rutherglen, although this same tradition calls them Picts and suggests they travelled to the Cathedral site by a subterranean passage, which raises great credibility concerns.

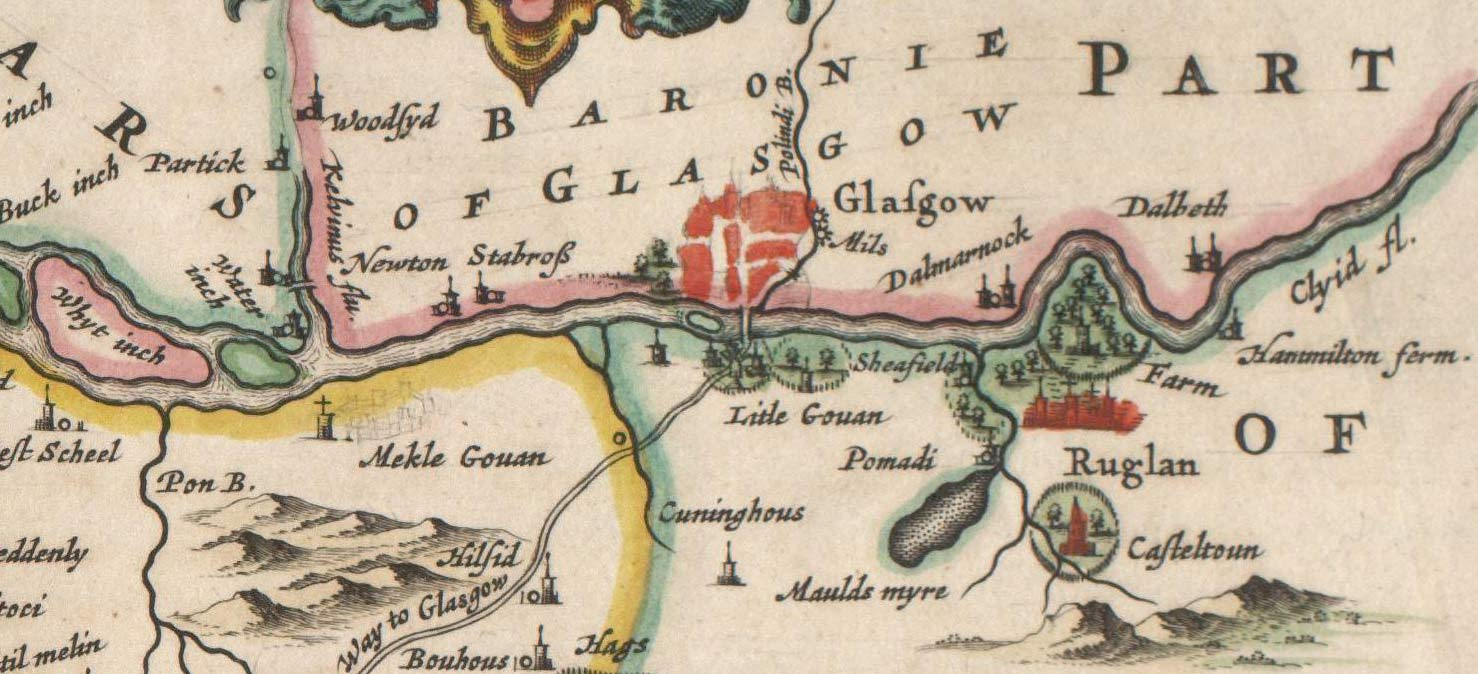
Rutherglen's prominence in late mediaeval Lanarkshire is shown in the Blaeu Atlas of Scotland (1654)—Castlemilk House ('Casteltoun'), Shawfield and Farme Castle are also shown

In the 14th century Walter Stewart, father of King Robert II, was granted Farme Castle. This was located close to Farme Cross in the north of Rutherglen, and stood until the 1960s.

Rutherglen Castle, located to the north of the town's Main Street today, was occupied by an English garrison during the struggle between John Balliol and Robert Bruce for the Scottish crown. It was besieged by Robert the Bruce in 1309 and eventually came into Scottish possession in 1313. It was destroyed by Regent Murray after the Battle of Langside with the stones used for other buildings, and no trace remaining.

Rutherglen was a centre of heavy industry, having a long coal mining tradition which died out by 1950. In the 18th century, barges carried coal from Rutherglen to Greenock almost every day. A small shipyard, T.B. Seath & Co., was in operation on the Clyde at the northern edge of the town for several decades. The Clydebridge Steelworks, situated between Rutherglen and Cambuslang, began operating in the 1880s and employed thousands by the mid-20th century, but the workforce dwindled to a few dozen by the 20th century and now only refines steel produced elsewhere. J & J White Chemicals (later ACC Chrome & Chemicals) in Shawfield, which was in existence from 1820 to 1967, produced more than 70 per cent of the UK's chromate products including chromic acid, chromic oxide pigment, sodium and potassium chromate and dichromate. Today there is a significant legacy of soluble chromium (VI) waste in the area.

The town seal's 19th-century Latin motto rendered by Professor George Gilbert Ramsay is "Ex fumo fama" ('fame from smoke'). A local saying derived from it is "Let Ruglen's lums reek briskly". There is also the deliberately difficult to pronounce alternative "Ru’glen’s wee roond red lums reek briskly". (These are an adaptation of a Scotticism that correlates a smoking chimney with a prosperous, healthy and long life). All refer to the importance of industry and industriousness to the area.

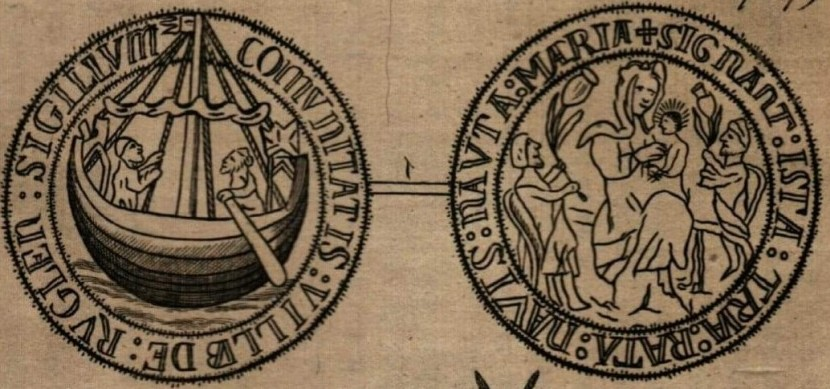
Faces of double-sided seal as published in 1793

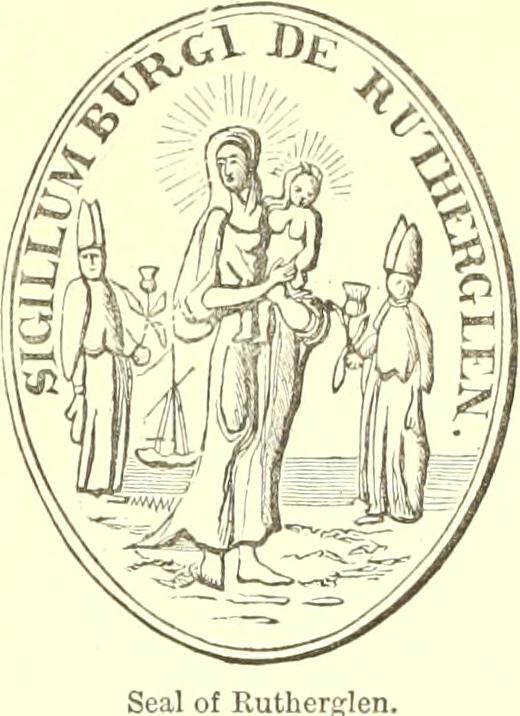
Seal as depicted in 1882

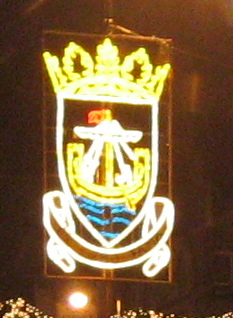
Simplified version as seen on festive decorations, 2005

The traditional version of the seal itself contained depictions of the Virgin and Child supported by twin angels (earlier by priests with thistles) and a fishing boat and men in the background. Along with the addition of the motto, in the 1889 official version the boat had a water design added, became more prominent and was placed in a shield at front centre, flanked by the angels with a helmet and mantling above, and the Virgin Mary above that. Over a century later, a simplified version was produced in 1999 featuring only the boat, the motto and a crown to represent the historic Royal Burgh status (which by then no longer had any legal significance); in the early 21st century, this seal often appears on the local Christmas lights. The ship and crown appear on the similar South Lanarkshire coat of arms, with cinquefoil flowers representing Hamilton and a double-headed eagle for Lanark.

Horse and cattle markets, including the regular Beltane Fair in May and St Luke's Fair in November (accompanied by the baking of sour cakes by locals) were also common and popular until the 20th century, and are the reason for the Main Street being unusually wide.

== Governance ==
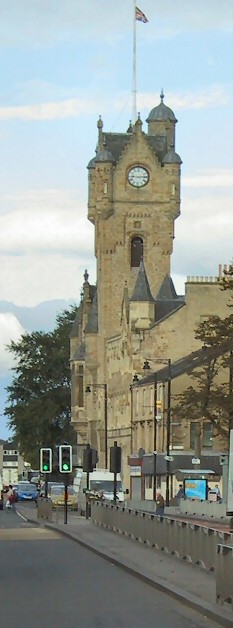
Rutherglen Town Hall

=== Westminster ===
A separate constituency in the Parliament of Scotland from the late 16th century, Rutherglen was a parliamentary burgh represented in the UK Parliament as a component of Glasgow Burghs constituency from 1708 to 1832, and as a component of Kilmarnock Burghs from 1832 to 1918. In 1918, the Rutherglen constituency was created, which became Glasgow Rutherglen in 1983. In 2005, Scottish constituencies for the UK parliament were reviewed with many new seats introduced, and the town fell within the new Rutherglen and Hamilton West constituency. Following another review in 2023, the Rutherglen constituency was revived.

As of October 2023, Michael Shanks of the Scottish Labour Party is the local MP; He won a by-election after the previous incumbent Margaret Ferrier, latterly an independent, was removed in a recall petition. Ferrier won the 2015 and 2019 elections representing the Scottish National Party, with Labour's Ged Killen serving a brief term from 2017 to 2019. She was the town's first female MP as well as the first for the SNP (the seat had been held by Labour since 1964, with only two men – Gregor Mackenzie and Tommy McAvoy – representing the area between then and 2010, after which Tom Greatrex served one full term). Michael Shanks retained the seat comfortably when the revived Rutherglen constituency was first contested in 2024.

=== Holyrood ===
In 1999, the Scottish Parliamentary constituency of Glasgow Rutherglen was created, with the same boundaries as the then UK parliamentary constituency. Labour's Janis Hughes was the first elected MSP. In 2011, The constituency was redrawn and renamed simply Rutherglen (although it also encompasses Cambuslang and Blantyre). Following the 2016 elections, Clare Haughey (SNP) is the MSP for Rutherglen. The defeated incumbent James Kelly (Labour) was elected as a list MSP for the Glasgow region which includes Rutherglen due to the town's proximity to the city. Haughey held the seat in the 2021 election with a slightly increased majority.

=== South Lanarkshire Council ===
Administratively, the historic town centre is within the Rutherglen Central and North ward of South Lanarkshire Council, which has a population of around 15,000. Taking another ward encompassing the southern parts of the town into consideration, its overall population was approximately 30,000 in 2016. With neighbouring Cambuslang's figures being very similar, the many services and amenities shared between the towns should provide for 60,000 residents, many assessed as living in economic hardship.

- South Lanarkshire Council election results detailing local wards: 1995, 1999; 2003; 2007; 2012; 2017; 2022

== Transport ==
Rutherglen Burgh is served by Rutherglen railway station (opened in 1849), with Croftfoot and Burnside stations closer to southern parts of the town. There are also numerous bus links into Glasgow city centre or other destinations such as Hamilton, East Kilbride, Govanhill and Dennistoun, all services either running directly along the Main Street (which has dedicated public transport lanes for peak times) or close to it via Mill Street / Glasgow Road (A730) to the west, Cambuslang Road (A724) to the north or Stonelaw Road / Farmeloan Road (A749) to the east. Glasgow Corporation Tramways operated routes in the area from the early 1900s until the late 1950s.

Completion of the M74 Extension in 2011 meant that there is a six-lane motorway bisecting the northern part of the town, allowing easier access to places such as Glasgow Airport and the English border. Some years after the project was completed, studies show that pollution levels on Rutherglen's densely populated Main Street were still measured consistently at dangerously high levels, despite forecasts that traffic levels on urban streets in areas served by the motorway would reduce.

== Media ==
The local newspaper is the Rutherglen Reformer (owned by Reach plc, with online content presented under the Daily Record banner). The local community radio station is CamGlen Radio.

== Geography ==
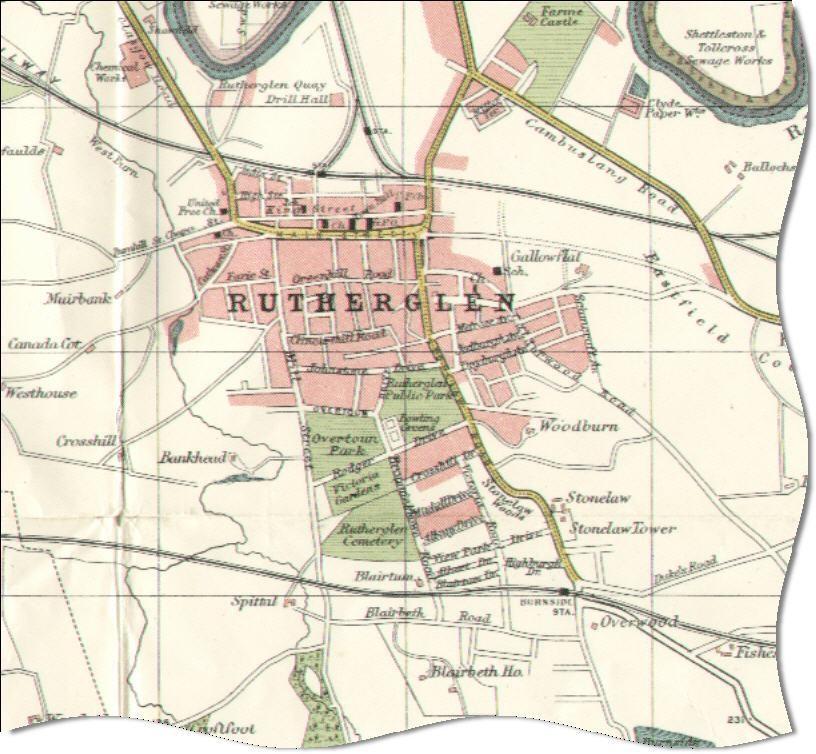
Map of central Rutherglen published in 1923

Since being granted Royal Burgh status by King David I in the 12th century, Rutherglen has grown considerably from its origins as little more than a single street, and although growth has been hampered to some extent by the proximity of the river Clyde to the north, the encroaching Glasgow urban sprawl to the west and the boundary with neighbouring Cambuslang to the east, it now covers a much larger area than its ancient parish boundaries. Historic areas near the Main Street such as Bankhead, Burnhill and Gallowflat have changed greatly over the decades, with the Farme Cross and Shawfield areas mostly occupied by industry of various types; the expansion of the village of Burnside (which falls under the Rutherglen boundary but has its own Community Council) to share a single suburban settlement with its larger neighbour, and the construction after World War II of peripheral housing schemes on land surrounding Burnside which had been either farms or rural estates (Blairbeth, Cathkin, Eastfield, Fernhill, Spittal and Springhall) have given the town a frequently changing character.

The 1922 book Rutherglen Lore indicated a deliberate intention for the historic Burgh area to be encircled to the south by residential suburbs, while all land to its north would be dedicated to industry, and that largely remains the case a century later. This focus, and the aforementioned territorial limitations, have meant housebuilding has generally been southwards on the higher ground leading to the Cathkin Braes (with almost all suitable land occupied by the early 21st century) and nowadays the town's historic core, with the majority of facilities and the highest population density, is concentrated much further north than the geographic centre. Cambuslang has a similar issue: its main street is in the far west of its territory near to the Rutherglen boundary and the river, and eastwards has been the easiest direction of its suburban expansion.

=== Burgh (Main Street) and Clincarthill ===
The Burgh area includes the old heart of the Royal Burgh of Rutherglen around the ancient and unusually wide, tree-lined Main Street and its environs, which have been designated a conservation area since 2008. It features several religious establishments, various pubs, shops and restaurants, historic and modern civic buildings and community facilities, all within a dense network of housing, mainly tenements. In the 2000s, a webcam focused on the everyday activities at the western end of Main Street was recognised as having among the highest number of views in the world at the time for footage of its type, despite there being no obvious reason for this popularity; the webcam is no longer in operation, although later proposals were made by local civic figures to have another installed.

The dominant architectural feature of the Main Street, on its north side, is the imposing Town Hall built in 1862 to a design by Charles Wilson. Having fallen into disrepair and disuse the Category A-listed building was refurbished and extended around 2005 and today is a venue for weddings, theatrical performances and exhibitions, while still providing some local services.

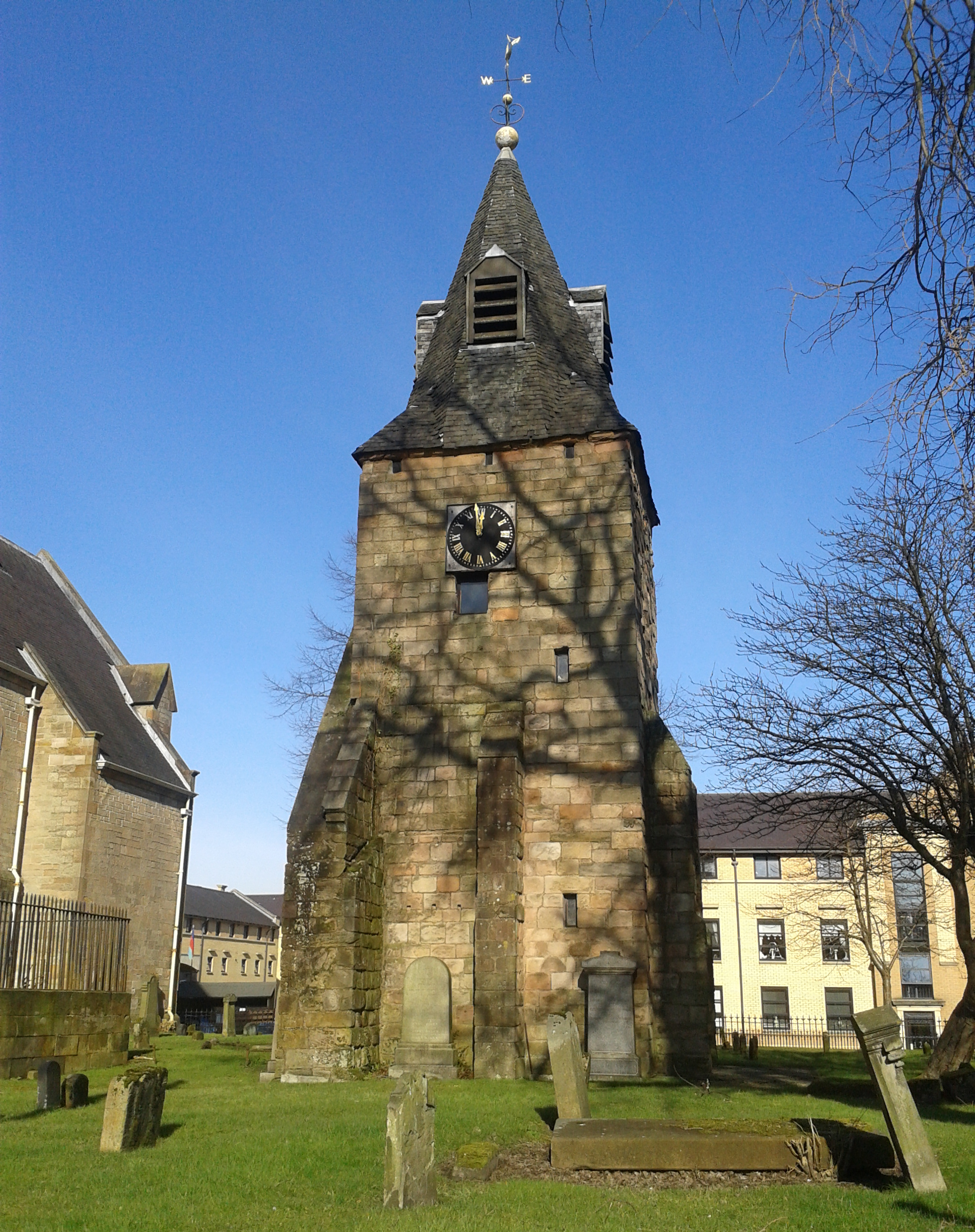
St Mary's bell tower in churchyard (16th century)

Most of the other most important Rutherglen landmarks are in the immediate vicinity of the Town Hall. To its west is Rutherglen Old Parish Church, the fourth incarnation of the institution (which has had a building on the site since around 600 AD) constructed in 1902 to a J. J. Burnet design. Between the church and the town hall sits the ancient graveyard (13th century), the St Mary's bell tower (16th century) and its Kirk Port stone entrance (17th century). The mediaeval church was said to be the location where William Wallace completed a peace treaty between England and Scotland in 1297, and where John de Menteith subsequently agreed a pact to betray Wallace in 1305, events which are marked by plaques and commemorated annually by Scottish nationalists.

On the corner of Main Street and Queen Street outside the church is a statue of Dr. James Gorman (1832–1899), a well-known local surgeon – this was erected in 1901 by public subscription due to his great standing in the area for his actions, including treating the injured after mining disasters. To the rear of the church is a Masonic Hall dating from 1897 and built to replace older premises on Cathcart Road – the group can trace their origins locally back to the 1760s.

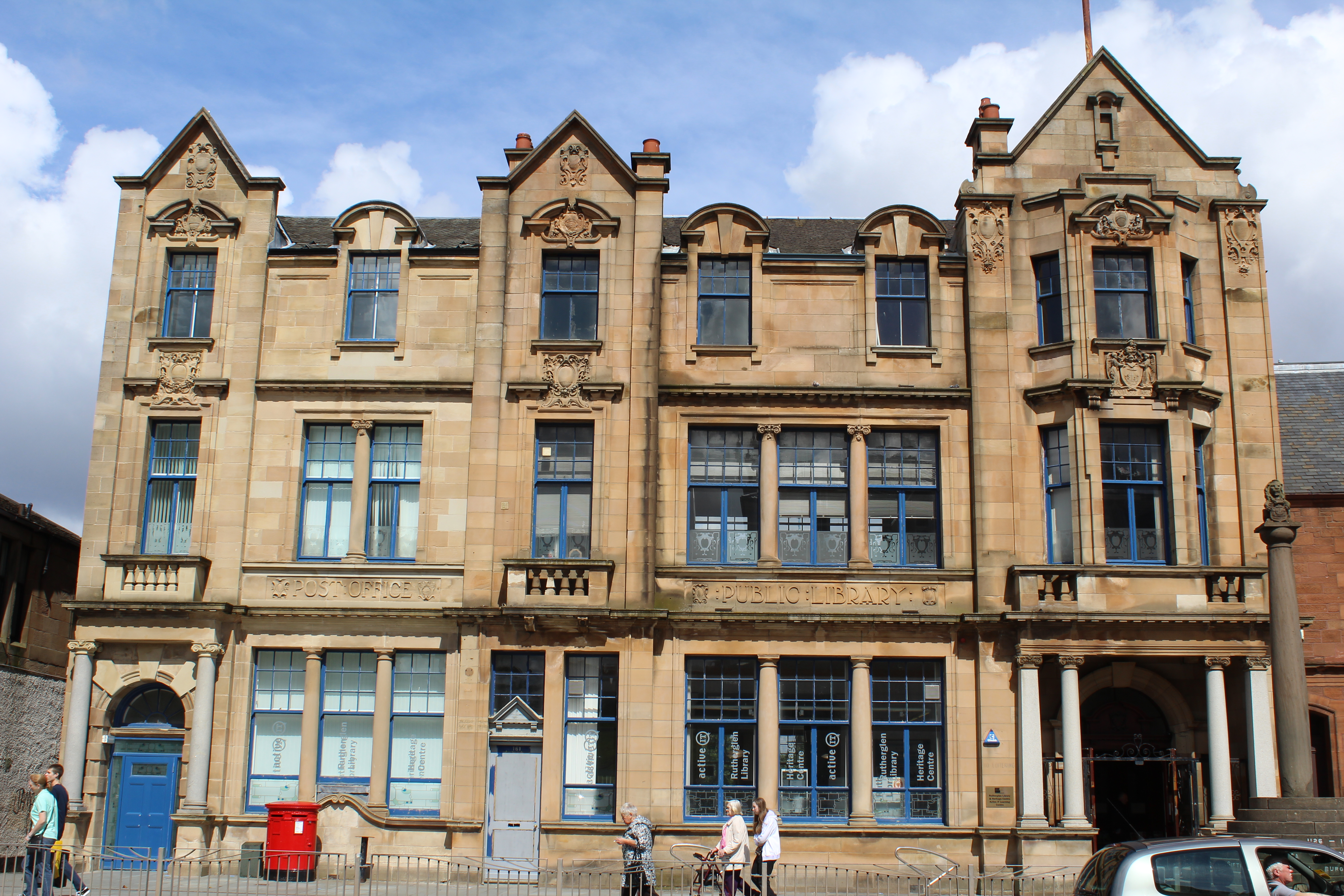
Rutherglen Library and Post Office building (1907)

To the immediate east of the Town Hall is the burgh's public library constructed in 1907 to an Edwardian design by Sinclair & Ballantine (technically 'Post Office and Library', but the dedicated post office closed in 2005, with its replacement inside an existing shop further east along the Main Street). A Carnegie library, its main hall to the rear features a stained-glass dome in the roof and oak paneling in the interior. Its first librarian, who also lived in the upper floor, was William Ross Shearer, author of the 1922 book Rutherglen Lore which would come to be considered one of the most important references for the town's long history. The building was refurbished in the early 1990s and re-opened once again in 2010 following a further extensive refurbishment which included an expansion into the Post Office section. On the wide pavement outside the library is a replica of the town's mercat cross (the original stood nearby from the 12th to the 18th century), erected in 1926 as part of Rutherglen's octo-centenary celebrations, and in memory of a former provost of the burgh. It was earlier the site of the old 'Tollbooth and Gaol' (town hall and prison) which was constructed in the 1760s and demolished in the 1900s.

Behind the library on King Street is the premises of the local branch of The Salvation Army whose brass band play regularly at the Old Parish Church and who have had a presence in the town since the 1880s; their hall stands roughly on the site of the mediaeval Rutherglen Castle, and replaced a wooden building initially used by the Rechabite Society. The local fire brigade (established 1892) was also based nearby, but since 1970 the local station has been at Cambuslang with other stations fairly close at Polmadie and Castlemilk.

Directly across from the Town Hall is St Columbkille's Church, the current main building of which dates from 1940 (designed by Gillespie, Kidd & Coia), although the congregation was established in 1851 and there has been a documented Catholic presence in the local area since the 6th century. Behind the church are its older halls, previously serving as a school, which was rebuilt internally after a major fire in 2004. To the west of the church, hemmed in by tenements is the 1930s Vogue Cinema, which is the only surviving building of its type in the town, although it was converted to a bingo hall in the 1970s.

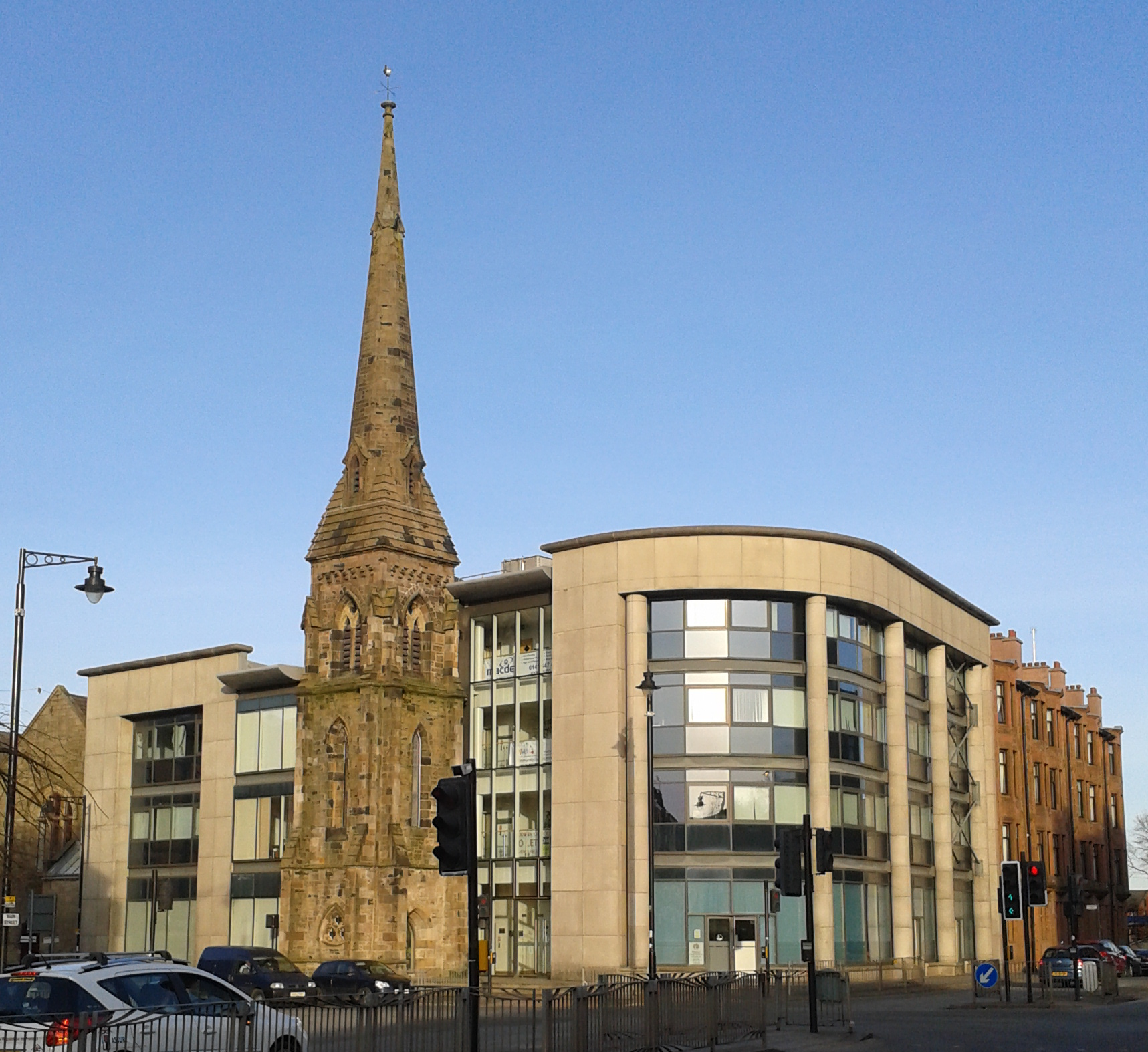
Aspire offices, with retained spire of East Parish Church

Other buildings of note include the 128-foot (39-metre) spire of Rutherglen East Parish Church at Rutherglen Cross – the junction of Main Street, Farmeloan Road and Stonelaw Road – which was originally built in 1872 for a Reformed Presbyterian congregation, closed in 1981 and was converted into the 'Aspire Business Centre' in 2003. Its church halls became a facility used by local community organisations. After a new eastern section of Main Street was set out with the removal of old cottages beside the church (this would later be extended through the Gallowflat area), in 1914 a cinema, 'The Pavilion' was constructed there to a design by John Fairweather; later being refurbished in 1930 as 'Green’s Picturedrome', it closed in 1959 although was not demolished until the 1980s. A further small church (Rutherglen Congregational Church) was also built opposite the cinema; in the wake of the congregation moving on to new premises on Johnstone Drive (where they remain to this day), its halls were occupied from the late 1930s by the Rutherglen Repertory Theatre, established by Glaswegian actress Molly Urquhart who set up in the town for no particular reason apart from the venue being available. The halls are now apartments (having been the 'Clyde Club' until a 1990s fire) and the theatre company have their premises a few blocks south on Hamilton Road, with many of their performances held at the renovated Town Hall.

Behind the East Church on King Street, once the location of one of the local Stonelaw coal mines in the 19th century, is the Rutherglen police station which was built in the mid-1950s; prior to this the local force, established as the Rutherglen Special Constabulary in 1848 (later part of Lanarkshire Constabulary, thereafter Strathclyde Police and today Police Scotland), had their premises and cells in the Tollbooth followed by the new Town Hall. The police station is adjacent to the former district Court and museum and was overlooked to the south by 'Royal Burgh House', an office block built in 1998, originally occupied by the local authority which subsequently relocated the services to East Kilbride and Cambuslang before the building was largely destroyed by a fire in 2022.

Further west between King Street and High Street, the ornate Rutherglen Evangelistic Institute was completed in 1887 with input from local businessmen John White (Lord Overtoun) and Daniel Rodger (brother of the local MP Adam Keir Rodger) and played a significant role in supporting local members in military service during World War I, but had fallen out of use and been demolished by the 1940s, with only the later housekeeper's residence still remaining and modern apartments occupying the rest of the site; however, the adjacent three-storey Burgh Primary School building (1901) has been retained and was converted to a business centre. Across the street to the north is Glenburgh Nursery Centre, a modern dedicated council childcare facility for the town centre.

In 2010, Burgh Primary moved from their 1901 building to new premises a few blocks east, still in the heart of town on Victoria Street, – this site was previously the location of the Macdonald School: built 1865, used in its later years as an annex for Rutherglen Academy, then as a nursery and community centre, demolished in the 2000s. The new school's mini sports pitch was once the site of the Rutherglen United Presbyterian Church from 1836 until the 1910s while on the opposite side of King Street sits the current Free Presbyterian Church of Ulster premises, next to a wynd leading to Main Street which has existed for several centuries.

The Mitchell Arcade indoor shopping precinct on the south side of Main Street, built in the early 1970s in place of a block of older tenements on Mitchell Street and Stonelaw Road and a small cinema (the 'Grand Central') was given a makeover in 2014 and renamed the Rutherglen Exchange Shopping Centre; it has a rooftop car park and used to feature a daily market. A branch of Boots Chemist occupied a corner site both in the older buildings at Rutherglen Cross and when these were replaced, having a presence at the same location in the town for over a century. The land to the east on Stonelaw Road stood unused for several years until the local council housing office (later a business centre) was constructed there in the 1990s, while as of 2020 the land across the road once occupied by the 'Electric Palace Cinema' (later a billiards hall) has never been built upon.

A short distance to the west of the Arcade, the contemporary Greenhill Court housing complex (consisting of three main blocks and two smaller connecting blocks, designed in a 'scissor section' setup) similarly replaced a street of tenements at Regent Street, as well as the Royal Burgh Bakery, home to Paterson's bakers (biscuits and oatcakes) from 1895 until 1971 when the factory became outdated and production moved to Livingston.

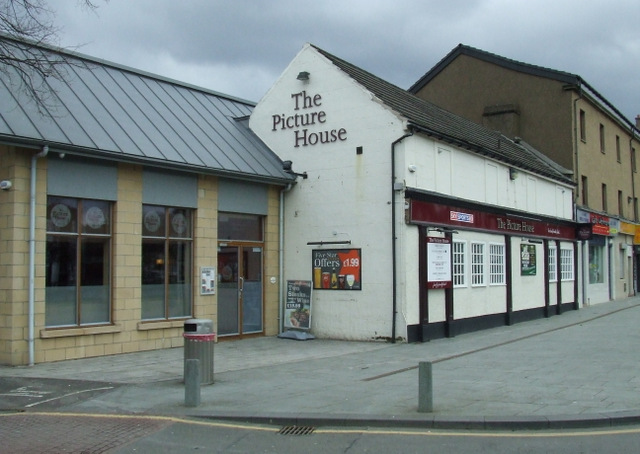
The Picture House pub, an old establishment with modern extension

At what is now the western end of Main Street (since it was shortened by the construction of the dual carriageway bypass first phase in the early 1970s), there are two public houses on its northern side; the 'Vogue Bar' has been present for some decades and is known as a base for local Celtic F.C. supporters; the 'Picture House' is a 2009 expansion of the equally venerable Linn O Dee establishment, taking inspiration for its name from another disappeared cinema, the 'Rio', which was demolished in 1971 to make way for the bypass. This extensive work on the road network in this part of the town also caused the destruction of the town's medical clinic (services were relocated to a new Health Centre on Stonelaw Road) and many other older residential and commercial buildings, and physically disconnected the war memorial and a church from the heart of the burgh (see Burnhill). Most of the pubs in Rutherglen are on the north side of the Main Street and to its west, a legacy of the Temperance (Scotland) Act 1913 when the south side of the street and other parts were declared 'dry areas' following local referendums on the issue. The Act was repealed in the 1970s, but it still drew comment in local media in 2012 when a textiles shop (previously the local co-operative society's headquarters) on the south side of Main Street opposite the Vogue and Picture House was to be converted into a new Wetherspoons pub ('An Ruadh-Ghleann', taking its name from the Gaelic version of Rutherglen).

There is a high concentration of licensed premises in the vicinity, several with a continuous presence on the same spot since the mid-19th century and others which have been forced to relocate but carry the traditions of earlier versions including the three aforementioned hostelries on Main Street plus 'The Sportsman' on Glasgow Road, 'The Millcroft' and 'Wallace Bar' on the old section of Mill Street and the 'Cathkin Inn' two blocks further south, 'Harleys Sky Bar', 'Gormans' and 'The Burgh Bar' around Queen Street, 'Chapmans' at Rutherglen Cross and the 'Victoria Bar' a short distance further north, plus three dedicated off-sales and additional licensed grocers, and several other premises which were converted from bars to other uses in the early-21st century. As well as the clustering of pubs being explained by historic licensing arrangements, the proximity of Hampden Park and Celtic Park football stadiums also brings some occasional additional custom to the area, which to some extent also accounts for a high number of bookmakers around the Main Street.

While redevelopment saw many of central Rutherglen's older tenements swept away, many of the others also fell into disrepair until work to maintain them was carried out by Rutherglen Housing Action Group, established in 1979. This later became the Rutherglen and Cambuslang Housing Association, based at the Aspire Centre and managing hundreds of properties in the area, although some like Greenhill Court are still managed directly by the local authority. Despite new projects being undertaken regularly by the organisation in the limited space available in the area, the shortage of homes available for rent became a major issue locally going into the 21st century.

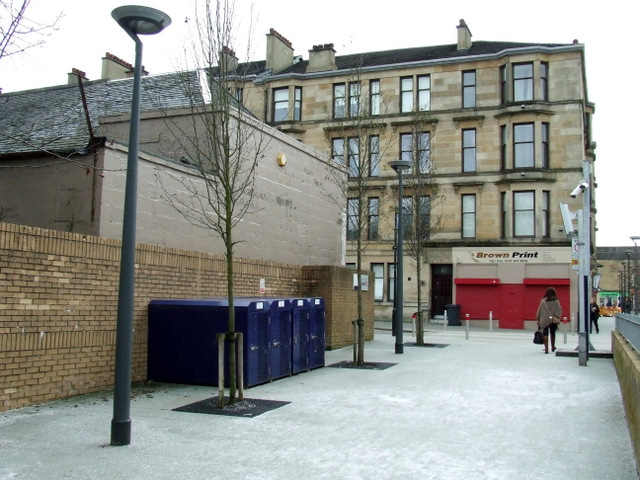
View from the main entrance to Rutherglen railway station onto Victoria Street (2016, prior to addition of murals on left wall)

The town's current railway station opened in 1979 is the fourth such provision in the immediate area, with the first (1842–1879 and second (1879–1897) - on what are now the West Coast Main Line tracks which no longer offer a stop in Rutherglen - accessed from either side of Farmeloan Road. The third version (1892–1979) was further west and accessed off Queen Street; it was soon extended in 1896 to include the Glasgow Central Railway line (which is now the Argyle Line served by the current station) which increased the total number of platforms on various lines to twelve, but this gradually reduced until 1964 when the Beeching cuts resulted in the Glasgow Central extension closing, with only two at Queen Street remaining. On the opening of the Argyle Line and new station in 1979 the old station was abandoned, although its crumbling platforms are still visible and its entrance stairway and walkway is linked to its replacement.

Located on an island platform and now directly under the elevated M74 motorway, the current station is connected to the Burgh streets via a covered pedestrian overbridge, the main entrance to which on Victoria Street was decorated with murals themed on the history of the town in 2018. Beside this mural to the west is Reuther Hall, a community centre used by a retired ladies group among others, while to the east is the building previously used as the town Employment Exchange - it has been converted into business use, as has the Youth Employment Exchange on King Street, while the local JobCentre service is now based further south at Greenhill Road.

==== Clincarthill ====
Lying immediately to the south of the Burgh area between Greenhill Road and Johnstone Drive, Clincarthill rises high over the Main Street offering fine northern views. The area has a distinctive character of its own, with plenty of remaining old sandstone tenements, villas and terraced houses from the late 19th and early 20th century, some on the incline accessible only via footpaths. A pedestrian overbridge across the busy Mill Street dual carriageway links Clincarthill with the Bankhead neighbourhood to its west. There are several places of worship in the area: Minhaj-ul-Quran mosque (previously a Scout hall), Rutherglen Baptist Church (established 1889, built 1903) and Rutherglen United Free Church (established 1902, built 1935), while the town's JobCentre is built on the site of another (Greenhill Church). Adjacent to this is a vacant plot which was the location of Rutherglen Swimming Pool from 1967 until the 2005 but has lain empty since.

There is also a Catholic primary school (St Columbkille's) in Clincarthill, built on the site of Bellevue House, a children's home run by the Daughters of Charity of Saint Vincent de Paul from 1912 to 1961 which was discredited in the 2018 Scottish Child Abuse Inquiry.

Rutherglen Primary Care Centre, the town's public health facility, is located on flatter land south of Clincarthill backing on to Overtoun Park (where another hill forms to the west) and built around 1999 to replace the Rutherglen Health Centre, which it itself had replaced the old clinic on Main Street that was bulldozed to allow construction of the Mill Street bypass road. Rutherglen Maternity Hospital stood adjacent from 1978 to 1998, but despite a good record of patient care and only 20 years in operation, it was closed and demolished to alleviate financial burdens in the local health board and concentrate a wider range of services over fewer sites. With the hospital constructed on reclaimed park land that had been an excavated part of a mine before being filled in, there was also concern that chromium contamination was present in the ground. The immediate area also features a number of old buildings, including a square block of red sandstone tenements and some grand villas.

=== Farme Cross ===
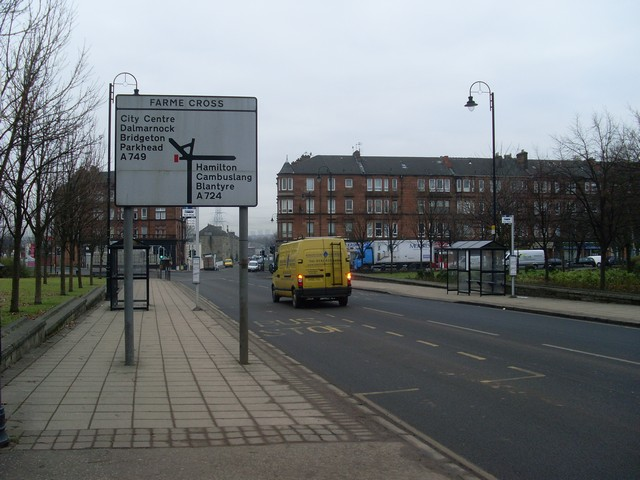
Approaching Farme Cross from the south (A749 Farmeloan Road)

Farme Cross is one of the boundary areas of Rutherglen and is surrounded to the north by the River Clyde with Glasgow's Dalmarnock district on the opposite bank, the two sides being linked by iron road and rail bridges dating from the 1890s, while it is separated from the old Burgh area uphill to the south by 19th century railway tracks and a 21st century motorway. It originated as the Farme estate crown property which was passed through noble families for centuries. Centred around the Farme Castle, it became known for coal mining from the early 19th century under the control of estate owner James Farie, with other industries soon following. The roads through the territory (A724 and A749) meet to join two busy routes between eastern Glasgow to the north, Rutherglen to the south and Cambuslang (via Eastfield) to the east. It was served by Glasgow's tram network providing transport for the workforces, a role still performed by buses.

There are several historic buildings and pieces of street art here, including a set of four carved standing stones ('Boundary Stones' by Richard Brown, 2001) installed in an area of open ground to commemorate the history of the Royal Burgh and its original boundary stones, some of which (dating back to the 18th and 19th century) are themselves still in situ, mostly at Farme Cross and in the southern parts of the town. Another monument ('Slipsteam' by Joseph Ingleby, 2001) alongside the river near Dalmarnock Bridge involves metallic cogged mouldings (featuring designs by local schoolchildren) placed on brick walls and emerging in loops from the ground, and recalls local industry on the Clyde and the contours of the river itself.

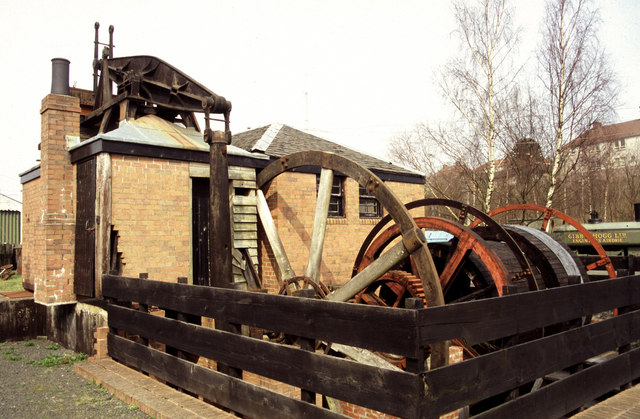
Farme Colliery's Newcomen atmospheric engine of the early 19th century on display at Summerlee Museum

Businesses at Farme Cross were once many and varied, with the energy to operate them supplied by a large power station just over the river, where the nearby Dalmarnock, Bridgeton and Parkhead districts also developed a similar strong industrial profile The industries included:

- the Farme Castle Colliery with two pits, associated row cottages and branch railway – its Newcomen atmospheric engine is on display at Summerlee Industrial Heritage Museum (Coatbridge)
- the Caledonian Pottery which was latterly operated by Hartley's Jams and was later the site of a small steel works; lying in the path of the new motorway construction, it was first subject to an excavation which uncovered the foundations of the original buildings for examination
- Scotia Bolt Works
- three dyeing works (Clyde Bank Works; David Millar & Co / Clydesdale Dye Works; Eastfield Dye Works which later became the Eastfield Chair Works)
- three tube/pipe works (Unicode; James Menzies and Co / Phoenix Tubeworks; and the adjacent James Eadie and Sons / Clydesdale Tube Works, both acquired by Stewarts & Lloyds)
- three wire rope works (John Todd & Son / Rutherglen Ropes; John Wilson & Son / Eastfield Ropery; and Clyde Patent Rope Works / Allan, Whyte and Co, acquired by British Ropes) the latter of which had a distinctive sandstone office with turret situated on the cross, demolished in the 1990s after falling into disrepair
- two paper mills (Eastfield Paper Mill near the river and the 'Old Farme' steading which has survived to the 21st century, and the larger Clyde Paper Mill off Cambuslang Road),
- Adam's Brickworks
- the Monogram bedding factory (previously used by the EKCO radio equipment company)

By the 1970s, the vast majority of these industries had either severely contracted or in most cases closed altogether, causing severe employment difficulties for the area. The low-lying area was severely impacted by a flood in 1994, as had occurred previously in 1903, resulting in improved prevention measures being introduced. One of the firms which endured into the 21st century, Sanmex Chemicals, eventually left town in the 2010s after a merger with an Ayrshire-based rival. Another, the bottling and distribution arm of The Speyside distillery, had closed a few years earlier. Both sites were soon advertised as new investment opportunities.

A Tesco superstore built in the early 21st century on some of the vacant former industrial land between the river and railway lines off Dalmarnock Road (specifically the Phoenix Tubeworks, which had been converted into a trading estate) was later extended to feature two fast-food restaurants. A small light industry development borders the superstore, and this mirrors the changes throughout Farme Cross, with the bustling but dirty factories of the past gradually being replaced by small workshops, business units and modern warehouses and depots, though in some cases with an intervening period of several years as derelict buildings, then cleared brownfield land awaiting development. Regeneration projects (controlled by the Clyde Gateway organisation) accelerated following the completion of the M74 Extension to the Glasgow Region Motorway network in 2011, with Junction 2 directly serving Farme Cross. This led to more ambitious plans being adopted for the area (as well as at Shawfield), including the Rutherglen Links environmentally friendly business park, the main building for which occupies a prominent location off Farmeloan Road, with further office pavilions further east towards the motorway junction.

Various further commercial proposals have been put forward for the eastern part of this area, with disused depots levelled and a driving range under construction between 2020 and 2022.

Despite its identity being dominated by heavy industry, there has always been a residential aspect to Farme Cross. The oldest surviving examples are the Terrace cottages, a cluster of four small streets built for local workers by the Glasgow Working Men's Investment and Building Society in the 1880s, the only co-operative housing of this kind in the town and built at angles off the main road, designated as a conservation area in the 1980s. Unusually, the two-storey buildings feature main doors at the front and the back to access flats on different levels - a similar design can be seen in the Colony houses at several locations in Edinburgh. Traditional tenements which once stood right on the cross in front of the terraces and opposite on Farmeloan Road were demolished in the mid-20th century, but some slightly newer sandstone tenements remain on the north side of Cambuslang Road and Dalmarnock Road, including a Category C-listed corner block which houses the area's sole public house at ground level (known as 'Tennents' for decades, with a small number of resident clientele, the business suffered as the passing trade from factory workers dwindled, changing hands several times in the early 21st century). The area facing this block, where British Ropes once had their turreted offices, was developed as the Lloyd Court apartment complex in the 2000s, the design of which resembles older styles. A small inter-war development of cottage flats around Montraive Street and grey concrete tenements at Barnflat Street and Baronald Street received new neighbours in the early 2000s with the building of around 100 houses at Farme Castle Court (this is actually slightly east of the actual location of Farme Castle).

Rutherglen's Kingdom Hall (established in 1958, rebuilt in 2012) is located in Farme Cross on Baronald Street. Across the street is a playground and a small local community hall. The Farme Bowling Club on Cambuslang Road, which was linked to the nearby Clyde Paper Mill, closed its doors in 2006.

The Cuningar Loop is an area of land south of the River Clyde near Farme Cross. An isolated meander of the river which was once a Glasgow sewage treatment facility, then infilled with rubble from the city's slum clearance programme before being abandoned to become overgrown, it has now been transformed into a woodland park connecting across the Clyde to the City of Glasgow (Dalmarnock) and the Commonwealth Games village development via a new footbridge.

=== Shawfield ===
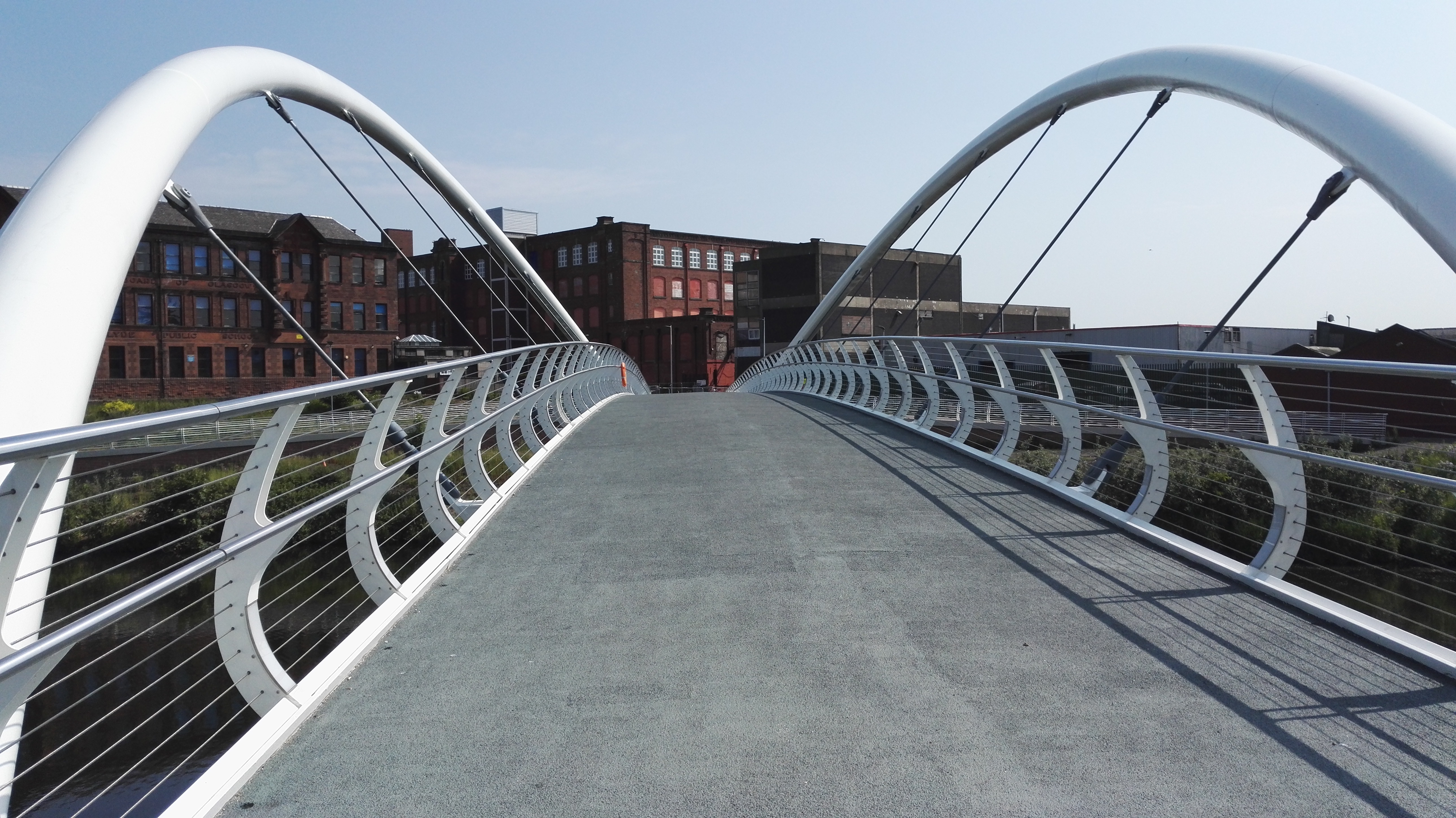
Shawfield Smartbridge leading to Dalmarnock

The Shawfield district, the mostly northerly in the town and once a country estate before being converted into a chemicals facility by the White family, is still industrial in nature, but much of it abandoned in the early 21st century due to the collapse of heavy industry generally, and contamination from the Whites Chemical Works in particular. The Clyde Gateway projects aim to reinvest in this area and create new business parks and make the River Clyde accessible in Rutherglen again – the town's old port, once home of Thomas Seath shipbuilders which specialised in Clutha ferries and paddle steamers, is located here. Currently Shawfield Stadium (the former home of Clyde F.C.) hosts greyhound racing; although not immediately noticeable, the building has Art Deco features.

Rutherglen Bridge at Shawfield is the oldest crossing between Rutherglen and Glasgow – specifically the Bridgeton district of the city which was named after the bridge when its construction accelerated industrial growth and trade in the previously agricultural area. Far more recently, a 'smartbridge' for pedestrians and cyclists was built to encourage links between the regenerating Shawfield area and Dalmarnock railway station, also in connection with the 2014 Commonwealth Games, several of the events for which were held nearby at the Emirates Arena.

=== Wardlawhill, Gallowflat and Stonelaw ===
==== Wardlawhill ====
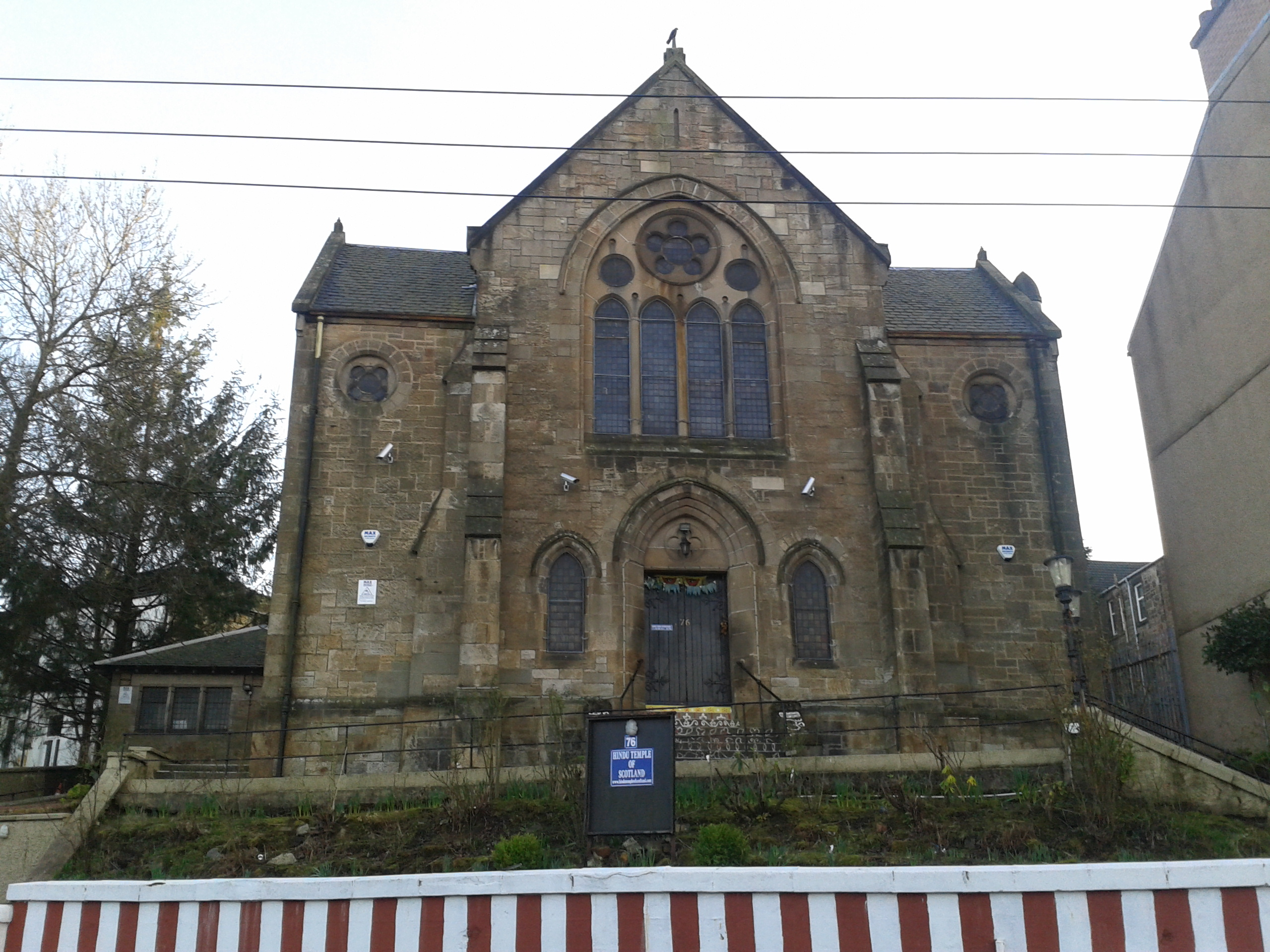
Wardlawhill Church / Hindu Temple

Lying across Stonelaw Road east of Clincarthill, the Wardlawhill area includes some older large houses and tenement buildings; a BBC Scotland report found that Wardlaw Drive, the hill's northern slope lined with tenements, ranked seventh among the steepest streets in Scotland. Adjacent to this street, placed at the top of stairs off Hamilton Road and partly built into the hill itself, is the Sri Sundara Ganapathy Hindu Temple (built 1882), previously Wardlawhill Parish Church – the congregation of which merged with the West Parish at Burnhill in 2007, the building being sold in 2010. The church halls across the road are still used by local youth groups such as the Boys Brigade.

To the south, on the other side of the hill is the Rutherglen Academy building on Melrose Avenue (built 1886) which later became Stonelaw High School and was converted into apartments in 2001. Opposite the Academy is a small early 20th century apexed building, originally St Stephen's Episcopal Church, nowadays used as a Masonic Lodge since 1971, after the group's previous premises on Cathcart Street (dating from 1875, latterly also used by the neighbouring Toryglen chapter) were demolished for the Mill Street bypass project. The house system of Stonelaw High School used to be named from avenues in the area (Jedburgh, Dryburgh, Melrose and Kelso, taken from the Scottish Borders); however, at the start of the 2018 school year this theme changed to Scottish Islands: Arran, Bute and Skye.

==== Gallowflat ====
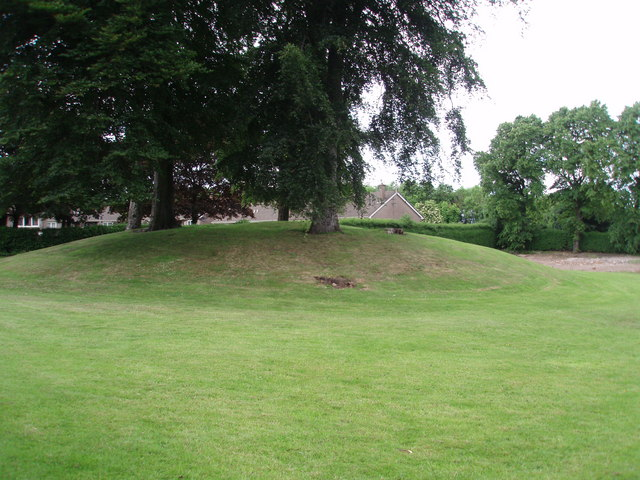
Tumulus at Gallowflat

The Gallowflat area, known locally as East Main Street, features some 1920s cottage flats and tenement buildings, dating from the construction of an extension to the Main Street – although it may appear natural for the route to continue eastwards as it does today, historically Main Street (and King Street) terminated at Farmeloan Road until the project linking it to Cambuslang Road and removing traffic from Hamilton Road through Wardlawhill. A prominent landmark is a tree-covered ancient burial mound which had been used at one time as an icehouse in the grounds of the grand Gallowflat House (built 1760s, demolished 1910s) which was located at the eastern end of today's Reid Street.

Gallowflat Public School (built 1908), later the annexe of Stonelaw High School from 1970 to 1998, was also in the area on Hamilton Road with most of its campus now largely replaced by housing and an elderly persons' care home aside from one red sandstone block on McCallum Avenue which was converted to apartments in the 2020s. During the 28 years when the Academy and Gallowflat buildings were part of the same school, hundreds of teenage pupils would walk the 400 yards (350 metres) between them several times each day via the very steep Wardlaw Drive and other quiet residential streets.

==== Stonelaw ====
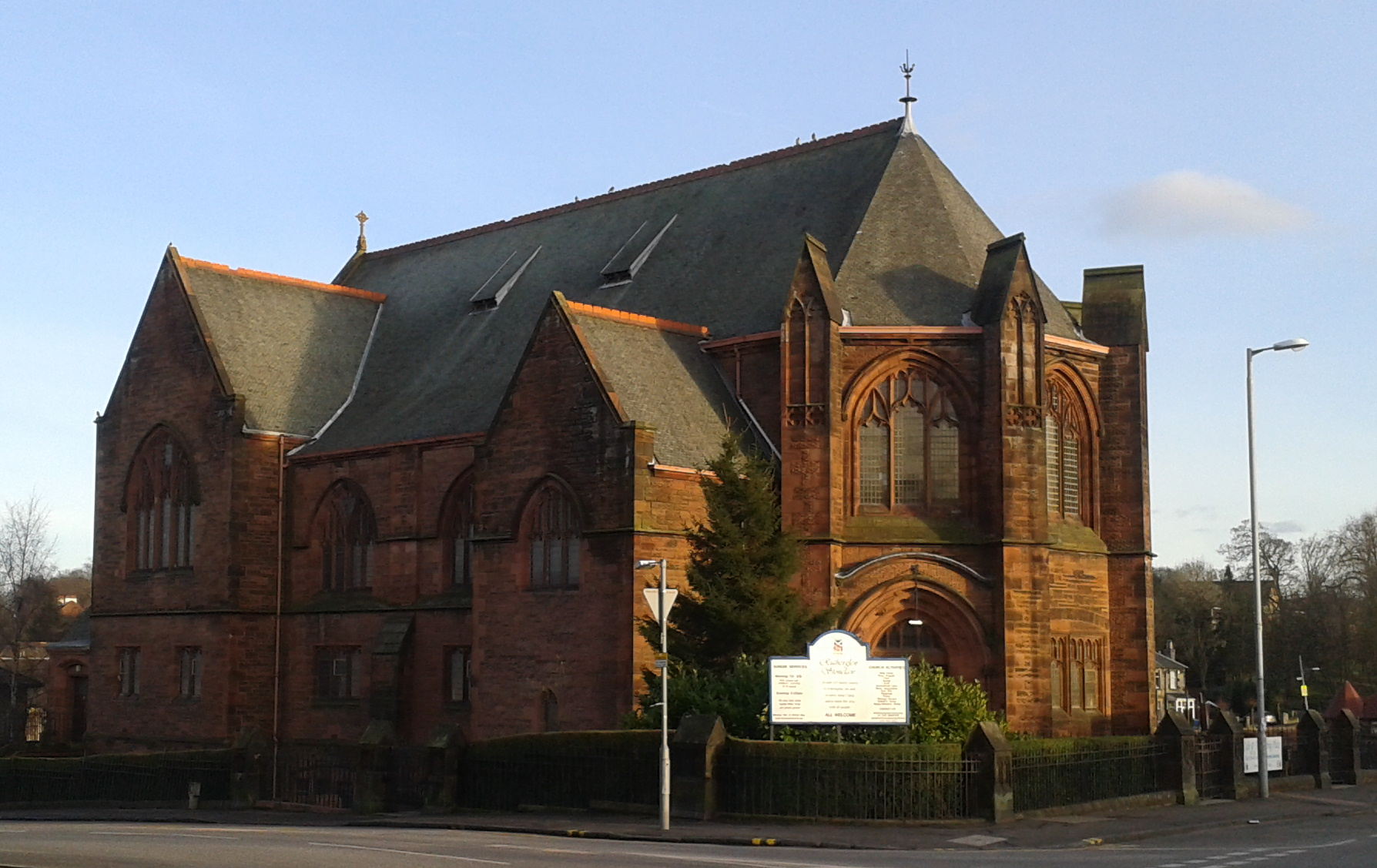
Stonelaw Parish Church

Stonelaw is the area south of Gallowflat and Wardlawhill and east of the Primary Care Centre, features of which include Rutherglen Bowling Club – having migrated south from its first (1868) site on Greenhill Road in 1902, the organisation then sold the adjoining land for construction of a church in 1907. The imposing red sandstone building which resulted is now known as Stonelaw Parish Church, though it too was built for a congregation relocating from the old part of town, in this case from their premises on King Street built in the 1830s. It was completed in 1912 – a refurbishment over a century later revealed a time capsule dating from the time of construction. A further modernisation in 2019 included modification of the main hall's pews, designed to accommodate far more parishioners than recent attendances, into a more flexible system.

There are two other bowling clubs in the vicinity, also dating from the 1900/10s when that part of the town was being developed: Overtoun Park Bowling Club to the west and Templeton Bowling Club to the east – originally part of the recreation grounds for the James Templeton & Co textile company which had its main premises on Glasgow Green, the club long outlasted its parent firm and the rest of the grounds are nowadays Stonelaw High School's playing fields.

A mansion house, Eastpark, stood next door to Templeton's (accessed from Buchanan Drive); it was converted to use a nursing home and has continued as part of the Abbeyfield care group, although the expansion and modernisation of the business led to the demolition of the old house, with only its conical sandstone gateposts remaining. Also at Buchanan Drive and on the east side of Stonelaw Road approaching Burnside is Woodburn Park, a valley-like wooded green space, previously a quarry. It takes its name from the adjacent Woodburn House which was home to the horticulture department of Langside College for over 60 years before being sold, demolished and replaced by houses and apartments in the 2010s.

This neighbourhood has many features of the garden suburb, and is perhaps the most up-market place in Rutherglen, being home to many expensive properties. A development of distinctive quartered villas on Rosslyn Avenue / Dryburgh Avenue date from the 1910s, a few years after the houses at Wardlawhill and Clincarthill were completed as Rutherglen began to expand southwards.

The new (1998) site of Stonelaw High School and its sports facilities off Calderwood Road are on the peripheries of the Stonelaw and Burnside areas and also close to Eastfield. Another local school, Calderwood Primary on Buchanan Drive, is sometimes labelled as being located in the Burnside neighbourhood, although its catchment areas are mainly Stonelaw, Eastfield, Gallowflat and the residential streets around Richmond Drive (mostly bungalows built in the 1930s) that, like the schools, do not fall under any single recognised neighbourhood.

=== Eastfield ===
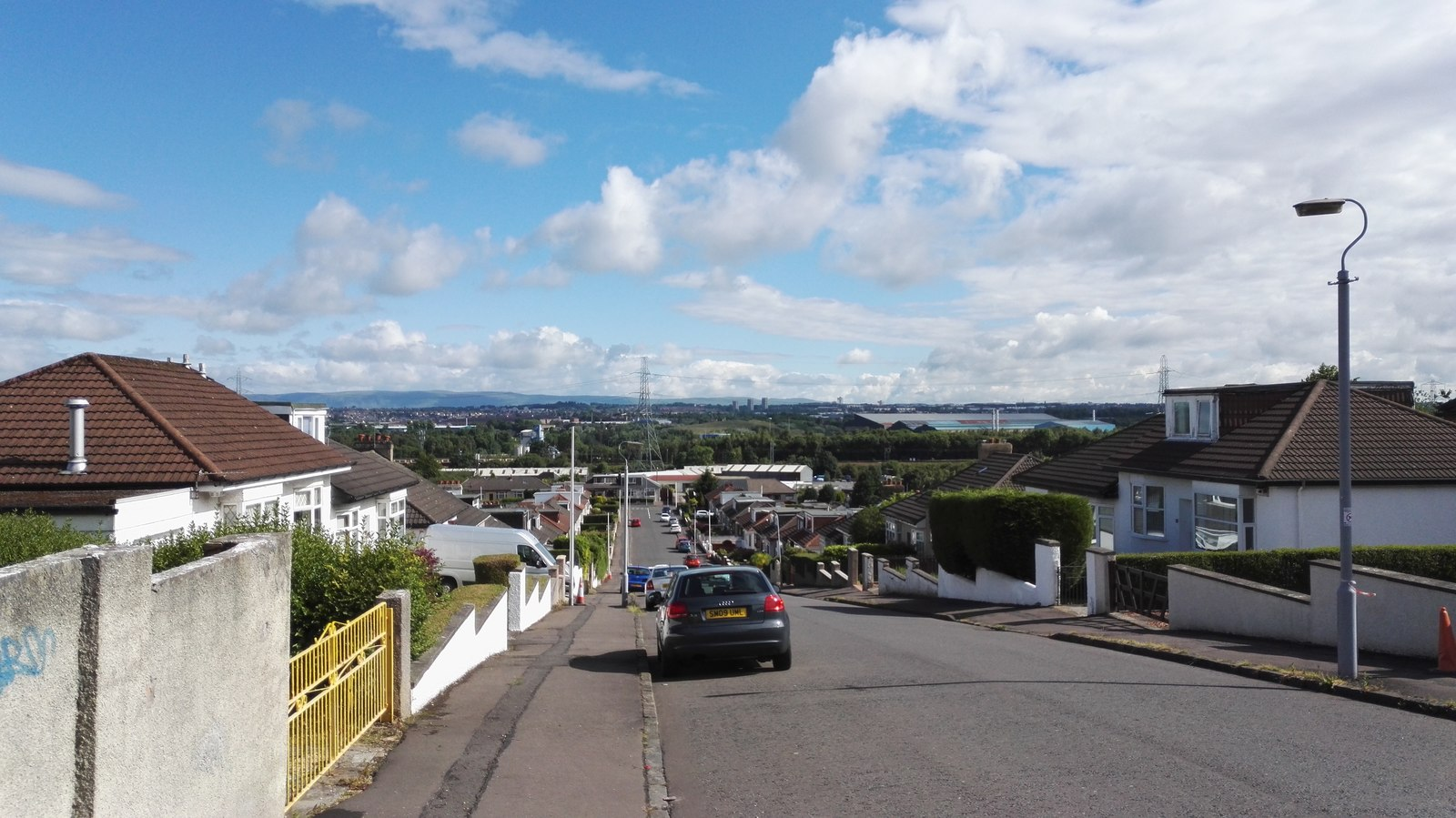
View north down Eskdale Drive towards Clydebridge Steelworks

A former mining community and country estate located off the main road between Rutherglen and Cambuslang, the area was developed for housing in the 1950s. Trinity High School (built in 1970, re-built in 2010) and its sports facilities including public swimming pool are located in Eastfield, which also has two public houses, both off Dukes Road.

To the north of Eastfield and east of Farme Cross is the Clydebridge Steelworks, nowadays operating to a far lower capacity and with a fraction of workers than at its peak points in the mid-20th century when over 3,000 were employed there. Located within a meander of the River Clyde, it was largely inaccessible to civilians until 2011 when the M74 motorway extension was constructed through the middle of its extensive territory. In 2020, the corporation which owned the works announced development plans for the grounds, beginning with a hotel.

=== Burnhill, Newfield and Bankhead ===
==== Burnhill ====
Burnhill, in the north-west of Rutherglen, directly borders the Glasgow district of Toryglen to its west (along with woodland at the Malls Mire) and the M74 motorway and West Coast Main Line railway tracks to the north, while its eastern side is close to the Main Street but separated from it by a busy dual carriageway bypass road (part of the A730), built in the early 1970s.

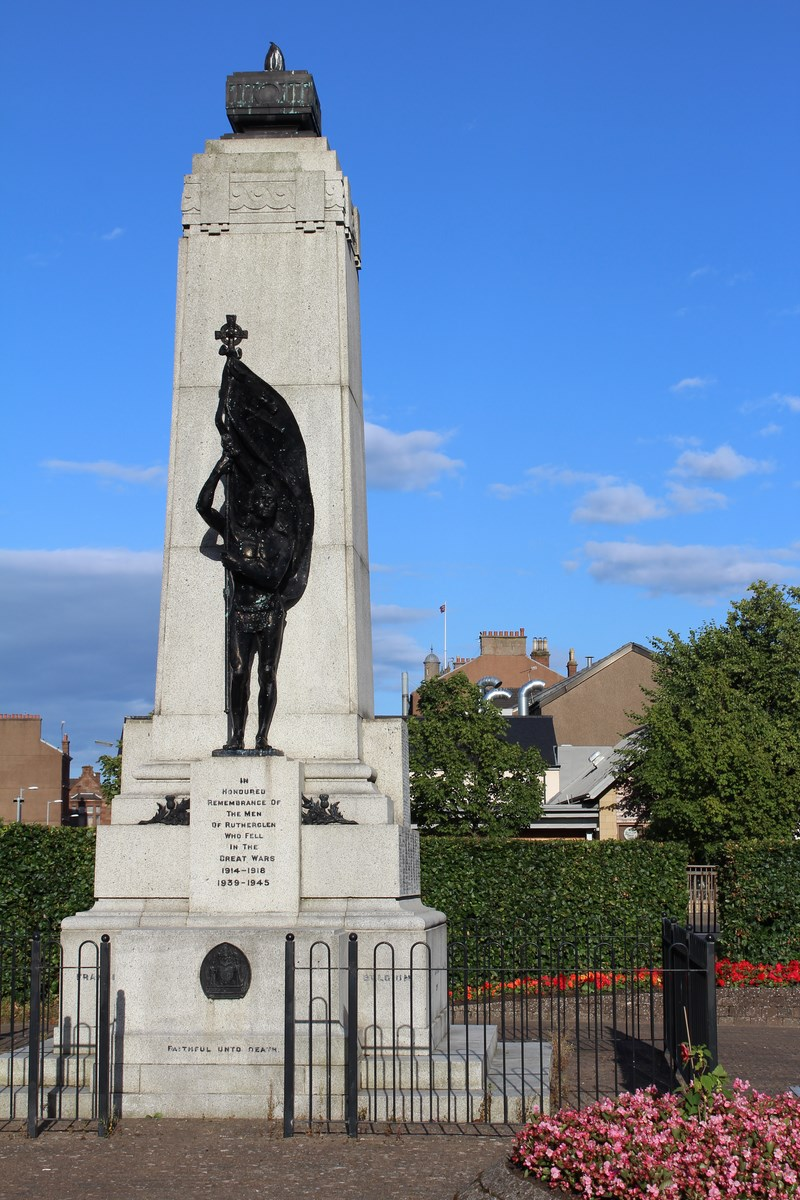
View of war memorial facing east

Historically a small network of streets leading west from the Main Street area, becoming increasingly rural in character (Glasgow then expanded in several stages to occupy the countryside between its southern districts and Rutherglen) the construction of the bypass caused the destruction of the area's older buildings at Burnhill Street, Chapel Street, Mill Street and Glasgow Road and also physically isolated one of the town's main landmarks: the Munro United Free Church, whose Category B listed building dates from 1850. Established in 1836, its congregation merged with that of the original West Parish Church when their building nearby (located on Chapel Street, explaining its name) was demolished to build the road and new housing, and in turn this later became West & Wardlawhill Parish following union with another congregation at the other end of town, both having experienced dwindling membership. Rutherglen's war memorial – erected in 1924, designed by Paul Gray with a bronze figure by sculptor George Henry Paulin which originally had a prominent location at the western end of the Main Street – was also left on the 'other' side of the road. The two parts of town are now connected via pedestrian underpasses which are prone to antisocial behaviour and occasional flooding.

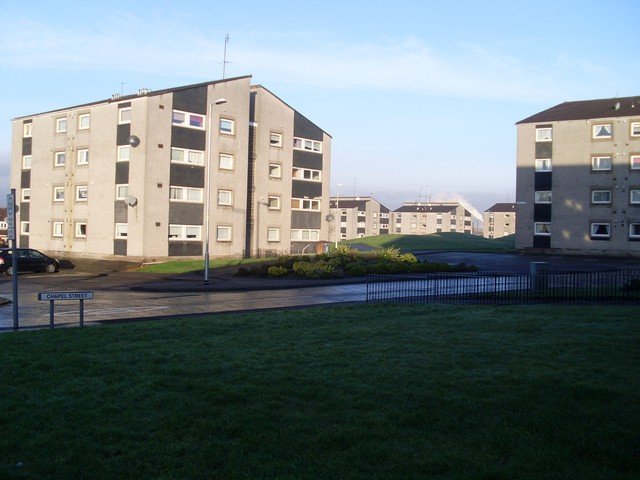
Part of Burnhill's 'White Flats' housing scheme, viewed from Chapel Street (2009 image, since refurbished externally)

Deemed to be an area generally suffering from high levels of deprivation and associated issues, the 'Burnhill Action Group' based at the West Church is a community-led volunteer group working to improve the locality's environmental conditions, recreational opportunities and facilities. The neighbourhood is recognisable for its 'White Flats' housing scheme (two dozen separate 16-apartment blocks, cube-shaped but with sloping roofs, dating from the early 1970s and refurbished externally in 2019 at a cost of £1.6 million) that replaced a development of prefabs. There is also older (c. 1930) housing off Toryglen Road and Westmuir Place, and grass areas also feature heavily, especially around the mound of Burnhill itself where the Jenny Burn, flowing from Cathkin Braes via Spittal and Bankhead, passes underneath making its way towards the Clyde. An enclosed area of communal ground behind the houses on Pinkerton Avenue known as the Highbacks, previously neglected until the 2010s, has been adopted and improved by residents as a community events space and garden. The White Flats development had a standalone pub at its centre, briefly known as the 'Burnhill Bar' but for most of its history named 'The Fairways' which took its name from the fact that the nearby land was once the open fields of Toryglen Golf Club (as well as Blackfaulds Farm) prior to residential use; it replaced a far older hostelry in the area, 'Ye Olde Inn', which had been demolished. The Fairways itself closed in the 2020s following the COVID-19 pandemic.

Burnhill is home to the local branch of the South Lanarkshire Council youth club Universal Connections, and also the Celsius Stadium, home to Rutherglen Glencairn F.C.; completed in 2008, it replaced the club's 110-year-old Southcroft Park on the other side of the railway at Shawfield which had been subject to a compulsory purchase order for construction of the M74, although there was sufficient space to build a new social club for the Glens beside the motorway at the original location. The earlier Burnhill Sports Centre, next to the new football ground, was closed and demolished in 2017, although the adjacent municipal football pitches remain in use, and in 2023 Glencairn submitted a planning application for a larger clubhouse facility in this area.

==== Newfield ====
Lying directly south of Burnhill, Newfield is a neighbourhood also adjoining Bankhead (Rutherglen) and Toryglen and King's Park (Glasgow) – the boundary with the city is difficult to observe from ground level as it involves houses backing onto one another right up to the border in most places; however, as it is a major administrative divide it is clearly marked on maps, with the street names also changing, e.g. Newfield Place becomes Ardnahoe Avenue. There are limited amenities including a pub, and small grassed areas are dotted around between the housing.

The burn flowing through the area provided power to industries in times past, mostly on Cathcart Road, including the Avonbank, Westburn and Burnside weaving factories, the Cathkin Laundry (1894 to 2013), previously the site of a curling pond opened in 1881 (probably linked to the Carmunnock & Rutherglen Curling Club which still competes today, though not locally based) plant nurseries including Glenroyal – now a small social housing development – and the Cathkin Bakery, the production facility for Nairn's (oatcakes and biscuits) until 1978. There was a Newfield House and sawmill, although the largest mansion in the area in times past was Muirbank House – this is long gone, but a pair of cottages from the same era survive almost hidden in woodland amidst far newer housing.

Falling within the Newfield and Bankhead areas is Westhouse, a small 2000s residential estate. It was built in parts of a former quarry, recalled in the names of the nearby street Quarryknowe and in the 'Old Quarry Bar' on Cathcart Road, although the pub – favoured by Rangers F.C. supporters and themed on the club – is located further east towards Main Street. Located on the ground floor of one of the few tenement buildings to survive the redevelopment of this sector of the town, the Quarry Bar is also close to the local Orange Hall, the 20 District Club. The rest of the quarry itself is now occupied by a trading estate, tenants including a non-profit community-focused bicycle repair and retail business.

Nearby is the site of Farie Street School (built 1875), latterly re-titled as St Columbkille's RC Primary from 1957 until its new buildings opened in Clincarthill in 1969; the Farie Street building was demolished in 1971 with the Mill Court housing estate soon built in its place. One block further south at Harriet Street (on a cleared site previously occupied by a timber merchant), plans were submitted in 2024 for the construction of a 'village' of modular accommodation for homeless people.

==== Bankhead and Quigleys ====
Bankhead is a neighbourhood located south-west of central Rutherglen, with its housing visibly of various ages owing to the burgh's expansion in stages during the 20th century. South of Newfield and directly bordering the Glasgow district of King's Park, much of its street grid shares the same design of 1930s grey pebble-dashed cottage flats. In addition to an eponymous primary school on Bankhead Road, there is a small row of shops on Wallace Street beside the Mill Street overbridge leading to Clincarthill, and more on Curtis Avenue approaching Toryglen including the 100 Acres pub – an adaptation of 'Hundred Acre Hill', the historic name of the high ground overlooking the area to the west. A further selection of convenience stores is located on Castlemilk Road in the south-west of the area, adjoining King's Park and some of its amenities including its main church. These are known locally as the 'State shops' after the State Cinema, later a bingo venue, which was sited there near to King's Park Avenue, a prominent local landmark from the 1930s until its demolition in the early 21st century. There was previously also a small public library which closed in 2010 (although named King's Park Library, it was on the east side of the road and thus administered by South Lanarkshire Council from 1996).

One surviving feature of Bankhead's rural past is the premises of Mitchell's Farm (earlier known as Crosshill Farm) dating back to at least the mid-19th century, although its fields on a steep slope were converted into the Cityford housing development around 1990. The Bankhead coal mine was a short distance south-west of the farm. The southern end of Bankhead Road terminates at another cluster of small shops and Croftfoot railway station, with a pedestrian footpath leading to the Croftfoot neighbourhood of Glasgow, and the Spittal neighbourhood of Rutherglen. There is another footpath further west at Castlemilk Road, but vehicles cannot use these routes, instead having to travel around Spittal, a detour of 1 1/2 miles (2.5 kilometres) from Bankhead Road at Croftfoot Station, or via Menock Road, a detour of 1 mile (1.5 kilometres) from Castlemilk Road at King's Park Avenue, to reach the same point on the other side of the tracks.

Once a private estate based around Bankhead House (owned by several generations of the Quigley family, many of whom were doctors), the land between Bankhead and Mill Street at Overtoun Park became a small housing estate in the early 1970s. The town's once-important corn mill from which the road name derives was located a short way east of Bankhead House, close to the Quigleys Community Hall of today – a fact commemorated nearby in a plaque placed on the old stone wall of the estate, also noting the completion of the upgrading of that section of the road in 1993 (Average Speed traffic cameras were installed there in 2018 to combat dangerous driving). The mill was powered from the Cityford Burn that flows through most of this side of Rutherglen and is visible here for some distance, running north then west to a small pond at Bankhead Road, known as the 'Paddy' (paddling pool), although this is somewhat overgrown and distended and is no longer popular with locals for this recreational purpose as it once was. Flooding in the area in 2004 resulted in extensive remediation works to prevent a repeat.

The King's Park Hotel is located to the south of the neighbourhood off Mill Street, while Rutherglen Cemetery's main vehicle entrance, lodge house and Cross of Sacrifice is a short distance further south past the junction of King's Park Avenue (B762), a 1920s wide boulevard which runs westwards parallel to the railway tracks for 1.6 miles (2.6 km) into the heart of southern Glasgow at Mount Florida / Battlefield.

=== Overtoun Park ===
Rutherglen's main public park is close to the geographical centre of the town. Laid out on land donated to the Burgh in 1904 by Lord Overtoun, (whose White's Chemical Works also ruined much of the area by reckless dumping of their toxic byproduct). it was once the location of the annual Landemer Day fair and parade, now confined to the Main Street.

The Category B listed fountain in the park was originally located on Main Street: it had been erected in 1897 to mark Queen Victoria's Diamond Jubilee but was moved to the park in 1911. The bandstand (1914, also Category B listed) was sited at the west side of the park until it was removed to be used at the 1988 Glasgow Garden Festival. It was re-sited on a grass area in the centre of the park, but later fell into some disrepair due to a lack of maintenance.

The park's children's play area was extended in the 2010s, and the park's BMX tracks have been maintained, but football pitches were built upon and the tennis courts were turfed over; in 2020, proposals were made by Rutherglen Tennis Club to install covered courts at the same location, which would involve a portion of the land being transferred to a private company.

Environmental charity Grow73 have their base beside Overtoun Park Bowling Club, and a Friends of Overtoun Park is also active.

=== Burnside, High Crosshill and High Burnside ===
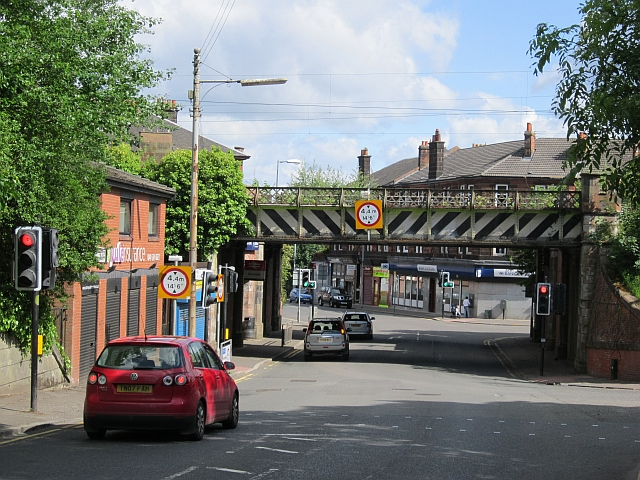
Looking north on Stonelaw Road at Burnside railway station's east entrance

Burnside is a village within the Rutherglen boundaries which expanded into a leafy commuter suburb. It is surrounded by several mid-20th century housing estates, in some cases modernised which are within Rutherglen but not considered to be parts of Burnside as they were built to provide homes for people from other areas of the town, and from Cambuslang, who needed to be re-housed. In contrast to affluent Burnside, parts of these estates are considered to be troubled by poverty and related issues, as asserted by several versions of the Scottish index of multiple deprivation.

Centred mostly around Stonelaw Road, Burnside has its own set of shops, church, railway station and primary school. It is also home to a supermarket (once the site of a cinema) and hotel with a popular bar (East Kilbride Road). There is also a bowling green, and two sets of tennis courts (previously separate clubs, they are both now operated by Rutherglen LTC). Much of the traditional residential property was built in the early 1900s from blond and red sandstone.

The local park, Stonelaw Woods, lies at the northern boundary of the village and takes its name from the demolished Stonelaw Tower (a castellated converted 18th-century coal mine winding engine house) that once stood to the east of Stonelaw Road near Greystone Avenue.

High Crosshill is a quiet residential area of wide avenues built on a steep hill between Burnside and Overtoun Park, which has some views on Broomieknowe Road and includes Rutherglen Cemetery. High Burnside is also a residential area, consisting of high ground to the south of Burnside leading to Cathkin Braes with streets of older houses built in several eras. Some of its properties, particularly some of the oldest off Burnside Road, are very large.

=== Spittal ===
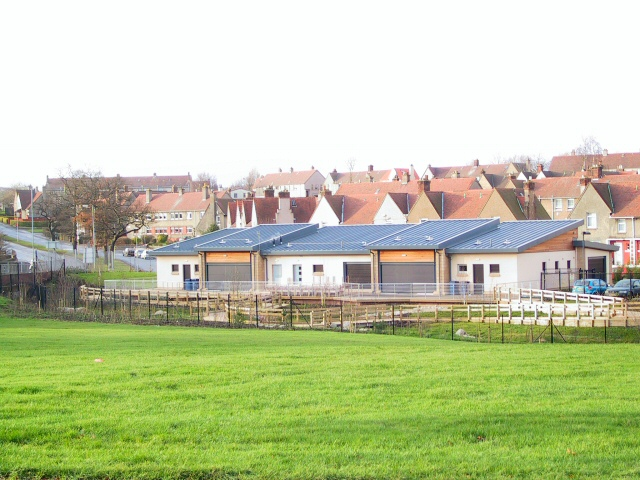
View west from Mill Street towards Spittal with original housing and more recent elderly daycare centre

Spittal is a post-World War II community which is almost an exclave of the town, bordering the Glasgow areas of Croftfoot to the west and Castlemilk to the south with an area of open ground to the east; it is close to the King's Park Avenue / Bankhead neighbourhood within Rutherglen to the north, but disconnected from it by the Cathcart Circle Lines railway tracks. Built on a mound used as farmland (the farmhouse was located at the junction of Carrick Road and Bute Terrace), the estate was constructed in an oval pattern of streets – named after places in or close to Ayrshire – with its primary school built at the highest point at the centre (completed in 1955). A development of prefabs on the flatter land to the west were replaced by angular blocks of flats in the early 1970s (as also occurred at other locations including Burnhill, Bankhead and at North Halfway in nearby Cambuslang). A new community centre was built in the early 21st century, close to the older small wooden church. There are also local amenities such as shops – including Post Office – on Kyle Square and a pub-restaurant, 'The Croft', situated exactly on the local authority boundary at Croftfoot.

Two small burns run on either side of Spittal's housing, bordered by grassed areas – one burn runs from Castlemilk Park and the other from further east via High Burnside, both originating on the north slopes of the Cathkin Braes; these waters converge north of Spittal, flowing north to Bankhead and on to Shawfield and the Clyde where it is marked as the Cityford Burn, but colloquially known as the Jenny Burn.

In 2016, the area's recreation fields bordering Croftfoot, which had been bequeathed to the community 'in perpetuity' in the 1930s but had been allowed to fall into disrepair over a number of years, were subject to planning applications for new housing. The Croftfield Park development was completed about three years later. A replacement modern AstroTurf football field was added adjacent to the primary school in 2019, although this was several years after the original fields were abandoned and six years after the school itself was replaced (built on its original red blaes pitch), as the old buildings became the temporary home for Bankhead, St Mark's and Burnside Primaries while their facilities were also renewed. Just south of Spittal is Kirkriggs School, a Special educational needs facility which is under Glasgow City Council control.

=== Blairbeth and Fernhill ===
==== Blairbeth ====
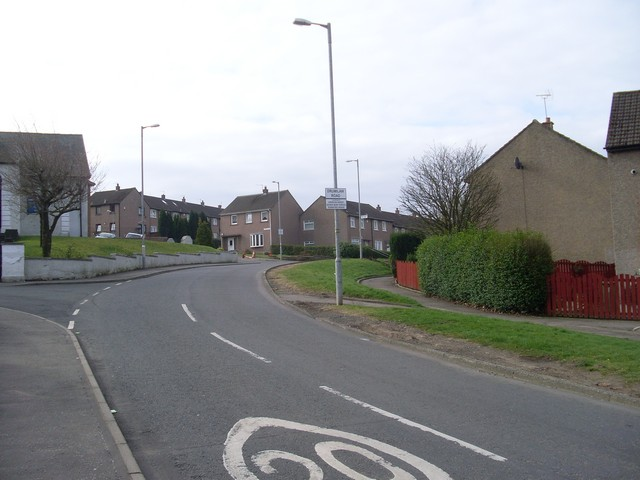
Drumilaw Road, the main vehicular access to Blairbeth from the north

Blairbeth is a small 1950s local authority housing scheme of tenements and modest terraced houses, generally still with the same appearance as at the time of its construction. It was built around a former rural estate (the house, sited at the top of Kirkriggs Avenue, is long since demolished, as was the entrance lodge house to its north). The neighbourhood has some limited local amenities and small parks, as well as a school, St Mark's RC Primary – its associated church of the same name is located to the south of the housing at the edge of the neighbouring Fernhill area, which has no direct link to Blairbeth for vehicles. The designated non-denominational school for the locality is Spittal Primary, although some children attend Burnside Primary which is equally close.

Also bordering High Crosshill and High Burnside, many of the hillside streets have views over Rutherglen and Glasgow. A large flat grass field to the west of the neighbourhood was popular in the summer months for informal sports, but its size was greatly reduced by a junction re-alignment in 2016, connecting Croftfoot Road and Blairbeth Road - previously a staggered junction via Fernhill Road with single lanes causing considerable congestion at peak times - into a single crossroads with filter lanes, as part of the Cathkin Relief Road works. To the west of this road is the boundary with the city of Glasgow, denoted visually by the twin castellated stone gates of 'Buchanan Lodge', today a nursing home but historically the north-east entrance to the driveway leading to Castlemilk House; the mansion no longer exists, although most of the route through its lands (most of which are occupied by the various neighbourhoods of Castlemilk housing estate) is still present as tree-lined footpaths, managed under an award-winning conservation project. A section of the estate's old boundary wall is also visible near Blairbeth, although crumbling and dangerous in parts.

==== Fernhill ====
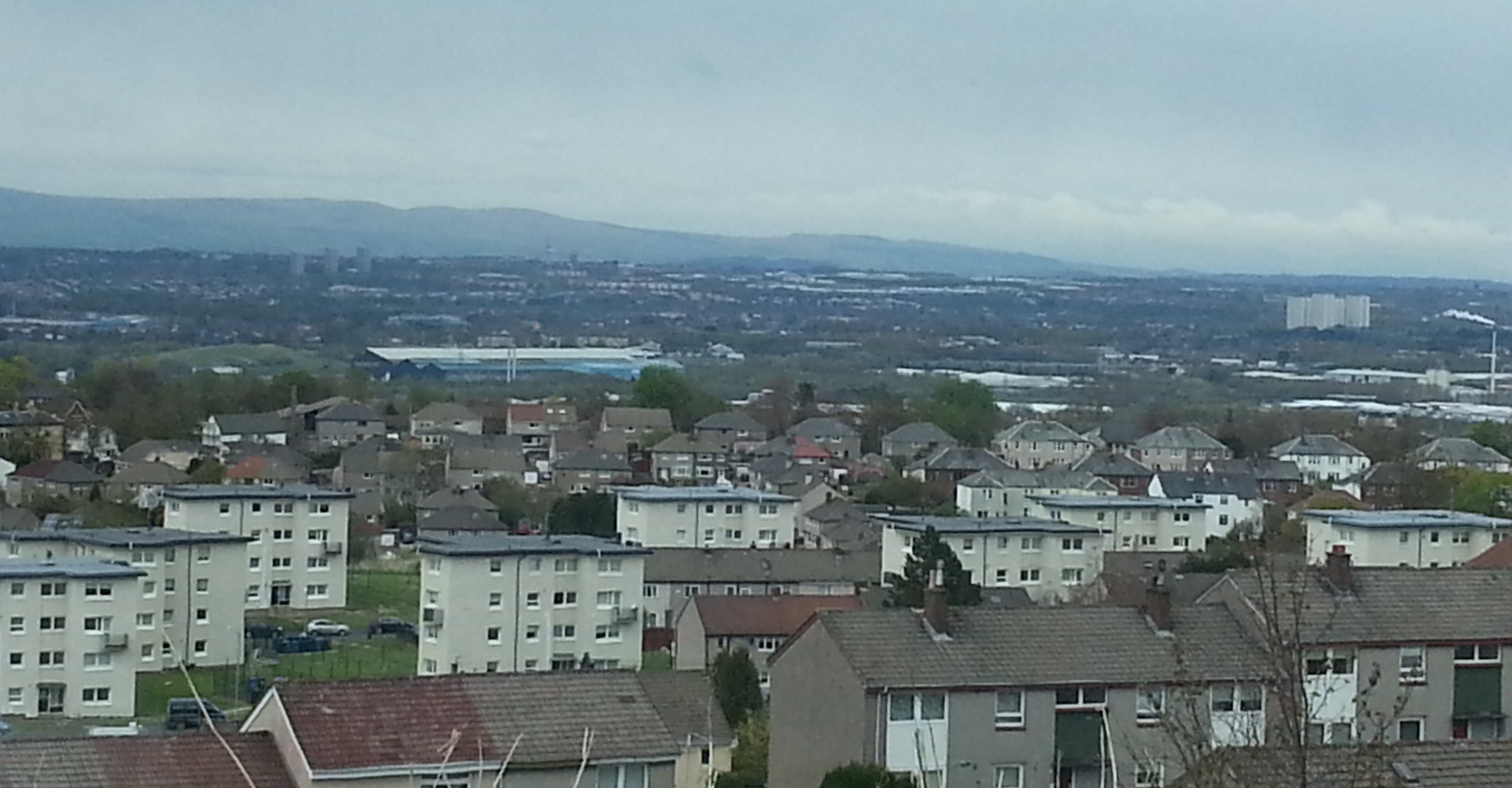
View from upper Fernhill over local houses and refurbished apartment blocks with eastern Glasgow beyond

Fernhill is a housing estate originally built in the 1960s, which underwent a great deal of regeneration in the 2010s. It is home to an all-girls private school, the main building for which is the historic Fernhill mansion house. The area is bordered by the Castlemilk housing estate in Glasgow to the west, as well as by Blairbeth, High Burnside and Cathkin within Rutherglen. Fernhill Road bisects the estate and is where the rebuilt local amenities (convenience stores, community centre children's play area, 5-a-side football fields) are found. The estate also has two churches at either end and a decorative brick entrance wall off Burnside Road.

The Cathkin Relief Road was completed in 2017 at a cost of £21 million to extend Mill Street from Spittal through the informal parkland between Fernhill and Blairbeth/High Burnside to connect with the existing Cathkin Bypass (A730) and alleviate traffic from other local routes including Fernhill Road. In 2019, Fernbrae Meadows was opened to the south of Fernhill; formerly Blairbeth Golf Course, the area is a 20 hectares of semi-natural, managed greenspace.

=== Springhall and Cathkin ===
==== Springhall ====
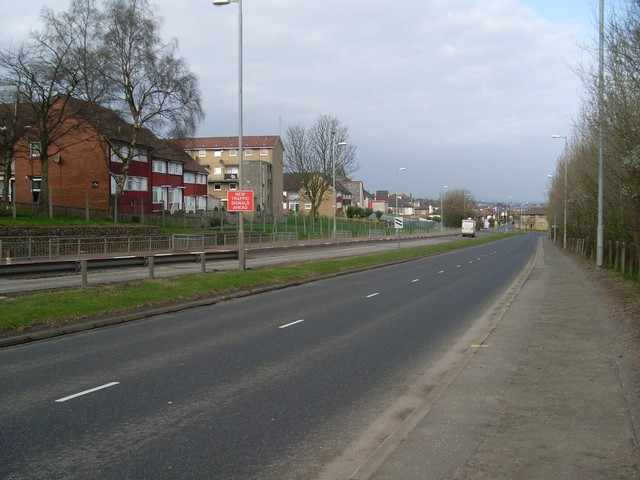
The A749 East Kilbride Road looking north, with Springhall buildings on left

Springhall is a self-contained 1960s local authority housing estate, mostly consisting of a compact network of maisonettes, and featuring a community centre and library dating back to the time of the scheme's construction but extensively upgraded between 2019 and 2021. Below the original library is a small set of local shops. There is also a catholic church and two local schools, St Anthony's RC Primary and Loch Primary, both rebuilt in the 2000s in a mirror image of one another and now share a playground. The schools' playing fields are located on the site of a former loch (Boultrie Loch) which was popular for curling and skating in winter. A stone sign welcomes visitors into the estate from the entrance off the A749 East Kilbride Road opposite a pub, 'Auld Cathkin' (previously the Cathkin Hotel and The Braes), and a long-standing Chinese restaurant. A short way further south on the Springhall side of the A749 is the unusual white castellated villa 'Elpalet', designed by the housebuilder John McDonald (whose companies constructed thousands of new homes in Glasgow in the 1930s, including hundreds in Burnside), to be his own residence. The property is now divided into apartments.

A 13-storey tower block (the only building of such height in Rutherglen, although there are 10 towers of the same design in Cambuslang) looms over the centre of the neighbourhood; it was built on the site of the Springhall mansion house that once occupied the land, which came to public attention in the 1910s, first when suffragette Frances Gordon was imprisoned for attempting to set the house on fire, then soon afterwards when a contingent of Belgian refugees of World War I were invited to stay there; it was demolished in the 1940s. Adjacent to the tower is a sports pitch in a wire mesh pen.

Cathkin High School, the secondary school affiliated to Loch Primary, is located nearby at the western side of the neighbouring estate of Whitlawburn – administratively this is part of Cambuslang, although shares some amenities with Springhall, with the schemes connected under the main road by a pedestrian underpass. A standalone pre-school facility, Springlaw ELC (intentionally named after both communities as a gesture of unity) was built on a piece of vacant land off Cruachan Road, opening in 2021.

==== Cathkin ====
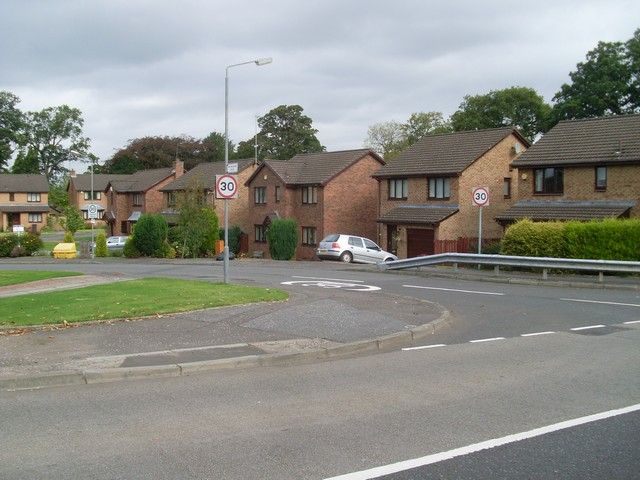
Isolated housing development south of Cathkin, accessed via country road to Carmunnock

Cathkin is the southernmost and highest part of Rutherglen, largely comprising a post-World War II estate which underwent a good deal of regeneration of its housing stock in the early 21st century. The estate borders the City of Glasgow (the Cathkin Braes Country Park and farmland belonging to the village of Carmunnock, also a civil parish in which Cathkin, along with Fernhill and Spittal, was located historically) and offers views over the Greater Glasgow valley. There is a small wooded area near the neighbourhood's eastern boundary with Whitlawburn. Limited amenities include a primary school with community facilities, and a church (located a short way into Fernhill and designed to serve both communities, as was the school) while local shops off Cathkin Bypass / Cuillins Road feature a supermarket, newsagent and betting shop. Like several parts of the town, a 21st-century stone and metal entrance sign welcomes visitors entering Cathkin from the bypass road.

The grounds of the old Cathkin House mansion (built 1799, and a children's home in the later 20th century) now converted to apartments, offer views over Rutherglen and Glasgow beyond. The mansion (now Category B listed) is surrounded by small separate residential developments, primarily of large villas, which also enclose around the buildings of Mid Farm, one of the oldest surviving properties in the area. Burnside Road, an ancient drovers' route winding downhill towards Rutherglen, no longer has a connection for vehicles with Cathkin Road (the B759, running east-west between the A749 dual carriageway and Carmunnock village via Cathkin Braes Park and Cathkin Braes Golf Club). A local landmark at that junction was a thatched cottage which was the childhood home of 19th-century missionary James Gilmour, but it has since been demolished.

== Education ==
Loch Primary and Cathkin Primary are feeder schools for Cathkin High School (built in 1970, rebuilt in 2008), which is located at Whitlawburn just outside the Rutherglen boundaries and is primarily the secondary school for Cambuslang. Conversely, two schools located in Cambuslang (James Aiton and Park View) are feeders for Stonelaw High in Rutherglen, along with Bankhead, Burgh, Burnside, Calderwood and Spittal Primaries within the burgh.

Trinity High (to which St Anthony's, St Mark's and St Columbkille's Primaries are affiliated) is the only Catholic secondary school for both towns, as is the case for Rutherglen High School, the local Additional Support Needs facility which shares a campus with Cathkin High.

All council-run schools in the South Lanarkshire area were rebuilt between the late 1990s and 2010s.

=== List of schools ===
2022–23 pupil roll in parentheses.

==== Non-denominational ====
- Bankhead Primary School, Bankhead Road, Rutherglen, G73 2BQ (310)
- Burgh Primary School, 41 King Street, Rutherglen, G73 1JY (180)
- Burnside Primary School, Glenlui Avenue, Burnside, Rutherglen, G73 4JE (378)
- Calderwood Primary School, Buchanan Drive, Rutherglen G73 3PQ (435)
- Cathkin Primary School, Burnside Road, Rutherglen, G73 4AA (194)
- Loch Primary School, Lochaber Drive, Springhall, Rutherglen, G73 5HX (203)
- Spittal Primary School, Lochlea Road, Spittal, Rutherglen G73 4QJ (151)
- Stonelaw High School, 140 Calderwood Road, Rutherglen, G73 3BP (1248)

==== Roman Catholic ====
- St Anthony's Primary School, Lochaber Drive, Springhall, Rutherglen, G73 5HX (161)
- St Columbkille's Primary School, Clincarthill Road, Rutherglen, G73 2LG (279)
- St Mark's Primary School, Kirkriggs Avenue, Blairbeth, Rutherglen, G73 4LY (158)
- Trinity High School, Glenside Drive, Eastfield, Rutherglen, G73 3LW (1186)

==== Private schools ====
- Fernhill School (Closed 2026), Fernbrae Avenue, Fernhill, Rutherglen, Glasgow, G73 4SG (230 – 5 to 18)

== Sport ==
Rutherglen Glencairn F.C. compete in the West of Scotland League Premier Division. The club was formed in 1896 and has won the famous Scottish Junior Cup on four occasions (1901–02, 1918–19, 1926–27, 1938–39). In 2009 Glencairn moved into a brand new stadium (New Southcroft Park renamed as The Celsius Stadium) situated in the Burnhill area of Rutherglen. following the demolition of the old ground (Southcroft Park), where they had played for over 100 years. The Glencairn Venue building on Glasgow Road, which is on part of the old site – the rest now being under the M74 motorway – is owned by the football club, although the company operating in the building is a separate entity. In the same season as their move, Glencairn won the West of Scotland League Central District First Division with a record points total, followed by claiming the West of Scotland Super League First Division at the first attempt in 2009–10. They won the latter competition again in 2018–19 to access the top tier of Junior football in the west of Scotland, and were runners-up in the Scottish Junior Cup in 2022–23 Scottish Junior Cup.

Clyde Football Club played in the area at Shawfield Stadium for 88 years before moving on in 1986, eventually settling in the former new town of Cumbernauld. The immediate area could be considered the cradle of Scottish football: Hampden Park, the national stadium and home to Scotland's oldest football club Queen's Park is close by to the west along with Cathkin Park, the home of the defunct Third Lanark; not far to the north is Celtic Park, the home of Celtic – all of which (apart from Clyde's former ground) are located in the City of Glasgow.

In addition to men's amateur teams (such as Stonelaw AFC (current) and formerly Rutherglen AFC of the Scottish Amateur Football League), the town also had a women's football club, Rutherglen Ladies, which was formed in 1921 and played at a high level throughout the 20s and 30s. More recently Rutherglen Girls FC was founded in 2012 and features three age group teams plus a senior women's team competing in the SWFL, Central/South East Division.

Coats Park, home of Cambuslang RFC (rugby union) is on the periphery of Burnside; the local athletics club Cambuslang Harriers is also based there. There are council-run football facilities as well as a 25-metre swimming pool and gym at South Lanarkshire Lifestyle Eastfield (next to Trinity High School), and a GAA field, Pearse Park (disused for several years in the early 21st century), is also in Eastfield. In Shawfield there is an indoor trampoline facility, while Topgolf opened a driving range in Farme Cross (adjacent to the motorway) in 2022; traditional golf has been played at the Cathkin Braes club on the southern edge of Rutherglen since the 1880s.

== Notable people ==
Several notable persons born between 1978 and 1998 are 'from' Rutherglen per their birth certificates, but have only a tenuous link to the town due to being delivered at Rutherglen Maternity Hospital which operated between these years; many children born here would have grown up in Glasgow, East Kilbride or elsewhere.

=== Artists, actors and media personalities ===
- Dave Anderson, actor, musician and playwright
- Janet Brown, actress and comedian, known for her impressions of Margaret Thatcher
- Steven Campbell, artist
- Andy Cameron, comedian
- Robbie Coltrane, actor and comedian
- Dougie Donnelly, sports TV presenter
- Gary Erskine, comic artist
- Jack Jester (born Lee Greig), professional wrestler, former ICW heavyweight champion
- Jayd Johnson, actor – one of her major roles in The Field of Blood (TV series) was adapted from novels (by Denise Mina) which are largely set in Rutherglen
- Scott Kyle, actor
- George Logan, Hinge and Bracket television comedy double act
- Mamie Baird (née Baird), journalist; married TV broadcaster Magnus Magnusson, their family home was in the town and was where children Jon Magnusson and TV news presenter Sally Magnusson grew up
- Alistair MacLean, television script writer, teacher at Gallowflat High School
- Tom McGrath, playwright and jazz pianist
- Matt McGinn, folk singer, born in the Calton but lived in Rutherglen for many years, wrote songs which mention Rutherglen such as "Ru'glen Jean" and "Rosy Anna"
- Edwin Morgan, poet
- Frank Quitely, (born Vincent Deighan), comic artist
- Richard Rankin, actor and comedian (born Richard Harris), starred in popular TV shows such as Burnistoun, Taggart and Outlander
- Audrey Tait, drummer for hip-hop band Hector Bizerk and rock band Franz Ferdinand
- Dougie Thomson, the bass guitarist for Supertramp from 1972 to 1988
- Midge Ure of the band Ultravox

=== Politicians ===
- Marie Cassidy, state pathologist for Ireland
- David Fleming, politician and judge
- Clare Haughey, SNP MSP (for Rutherglen)
- Ged Killen, Labour MP (for Rutherglen)
- John Mason, SNP MSP
- Baron Tommy McAvoy, Labour politician, House of Lords Life peer
- John Campbell White, also known as Baron Overtoun / Lord Overtoun, son of James White, also partner in the Whites firm. His successor William James Chrystal is mentioned in a plaque on Main Street for contributions towards the Old Parish Church.

=== Sportspersons ===
- Steve Archibald, Scotland international footballer, clubs included Tottenham, Barcelona
- Archie Baird, footballer (Aberdeen) and World War II POW
- Alec Bennett (Celtic, Rangers and Scotland footballer)
- Bob Davidson, footballer (Dundee)
- Paul di Giacomo, footballer (Kilmarnock)
- Simon Donnelly, international footballer (Celtic)
- Stuart Dougal, football referee
- Jimmy Dunn, footballer (Leeds United)
- Scott Forrest, Commonwealth Games rugby international
- Allan Forsyth, footballer (Dundee United)
- Mary Gilchrist, chess player
- Tommy Grozier, footballer (Plymouth Argyle)
- Bobby Harvey footballer (Clyde)
- Brogan Hay, footballer (Glasgow City, Rangers)
- Drew Henry, snooker player
- Harry Haddock, international footballer (Clyde)
- Niall Hopper, footballer (Queen's Park)
- Archie Jackson, Australian cricketer
- Colin Jackson (Rangers and Scotland defender), born in Glasgow and raised in Aberdeen but lived in Rutherglen for most of his life
- Thomas Leather, Australian cricketer and Australian rules footballer
- Stevan McAleer, racing driver
- Collette McCallum, international footballer for Australia
- Amy McDonald, international women's footballer
- Jimmy McMenemy, Celtic and Scotland footballer (won 11 league titles and 7 Scottish Cups)
- Kenny McLean, Scotland footballer
- Stephen McKeown, footballer (Partick Thistle)
- Brian McPhee, footballer (Airdrie)
- Bobby Murdoch, Celtic midfielder (one of the Lisbon Lions); in 2016 a plaque and display was unveiled at the Town Hall honouring his achievements
- Billy Murdoch, brother of Bobby, played for Kilmarnock
- John Moir, American basketball champion
- Jack Mowat, football referee, oversaw 12 domestic cup finals and the 1960 European Cup Final
- John Rae, international footballer (Third Lanark)
- Willie Robb, international footballer (Rangers)
- Peter Roney, footballer (Bristol Rovers)
- Steven Saunders, international footballer (Motherwell)
- Sandy Stewart, footballer (Airdrie)
- Dick Strang, footballer (Darlington)
- Alan Trouten, footballer
- Duncan Weir, Scotland international rugby union player, began career at Cambuslang Rugby Club

=== Others ===
- John Dickson Covenanting field preacher and prisoner for six years on the Bass Rock
- William Gemmell Cochran, statistician
- Jonathan Saunders, fashion designer
- James White, lawyer and a partner in J & J White Chemicals (statue in Cathedral Square, Glasgow)

== Bibliography ==
- Rutherglen Lore: Story of an Eight Hundred Year-old Royal Burgh, 1126-1926 by William Ross Shearer, printed in 1922
