= British Ropes =

Former British manufacturer

- Company type: SOE
- Industry: Wire and fibre rope manufacturing
- Predecessors: Bullivant and Co; Craven and Speeding and Co, D. H. and G. Haggie; George Craddock and Co; Haggie Brothers, Gateshead; R. S. Newall and Son; Thomas and William Smith; Tyne Wire Drawing Co
- Founded: 6 June 1924
- Defunct: 1972; 53 years ago
- Fate: Renamed Bridon Ropes
- Headquarters: Marylebone, London, United Kingdom

British Ropes was a company established on 6 June 1924 through the merger of eight companies.

The companies were:

Gateshead

- Haggie Brothers, Gateshead
- Tyne Wire Drawing Co (a subsidiary of the above)

Liverpool:

- R. S. Newall and Son

London:

- Bullivant and Co

Newcastle upon Tyne:

- Thomas and William Smith

Sunderland:

- Craven and Speeding and Co,
- D. H. and G. Haggie

Wakefield:

- George Craddock and Co

All but one of these companies were wire rope manufacturers (the exception being Craven and Speeding, which mainly manufactured binder twine). Over the next two years seventeen more companies were acquired, including wire drawers as well as manufacturers of wire rope and fibre rope; and the company began to invest in other ropemaking companies and associated industries, both at home and overseas.

By the mid-1940s, the company had rationalised its manufacturing business by reducing wire rope manufacture to seven sites:

- Cardiff (formerly Excelsior Wire rope Co.)
- Doncaster North Ropery (established 1935)
- Doncaster South Ropery (established 1938)
- Gateshead (formerly Haggie Bros.)
- Retford (established 1935)
- Rutherglen (formerly Allan, Whyte and Co)
- Wakefield (formerly George Craddock and Co)

and fibre rope making to four sites:

- Cardiff (formerly South Wales Rope Work Co)
- Charlton (formerly Charlton Ropeworks)
- Leith (formerly the Edinburgh Roperie and Sail Cloth Co)
- Sunderland (formerly Craven and Speeding)

Over a dozen more companies were acquired subsequently (several of which included multiple subsidiary companies). By the late 1960s British Ropes owned or part-owned rope manufacturers and distributors across five continents. In 1972 the name of the parent company was changed to Bridon Ropes, with 'British Ropes' being retained as the name of a UK subsidiary.

== See also ==
- British Ropes F.C., a works team of the British Ropes factory in Retford, Nottinghamshire.
- Bridon Ropes F.C., a football club that started as the works team of the British Ropes factory in Charlton, London
