= Castlemilk House =

Country house in Glasgow, Scotland

Coordinates: 55.809°N 4.220°W

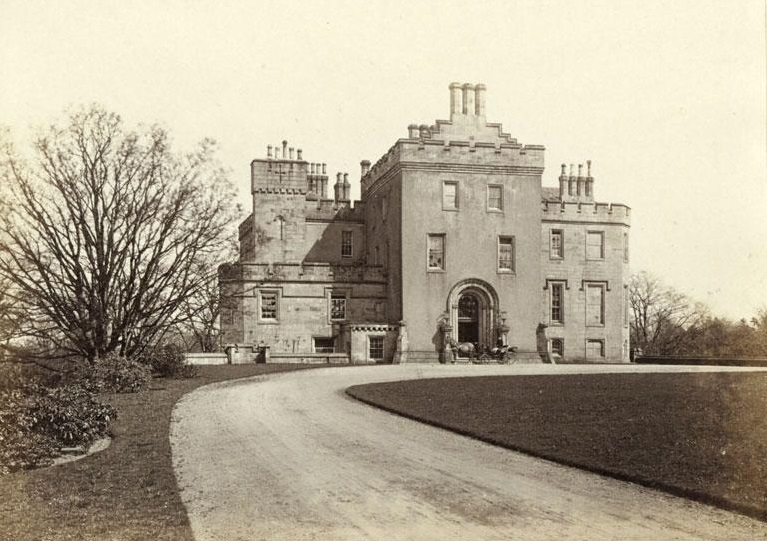
Castlemilk House, 1870

Castlemilk House was a country house located in what is now the Castlemilk district of Glasgow, Scotland. The house was the ancestral home of the Stirling-Stuart family and was built around the 15th-century Cassiltoun Tower during the 18th and 19th centuries. The house and Castlemilk Estate were purchased by Glasgow Corporation in 1938, with the house serving as a children's home until it was closed in 1969 and demolished in 1972.

== History ==
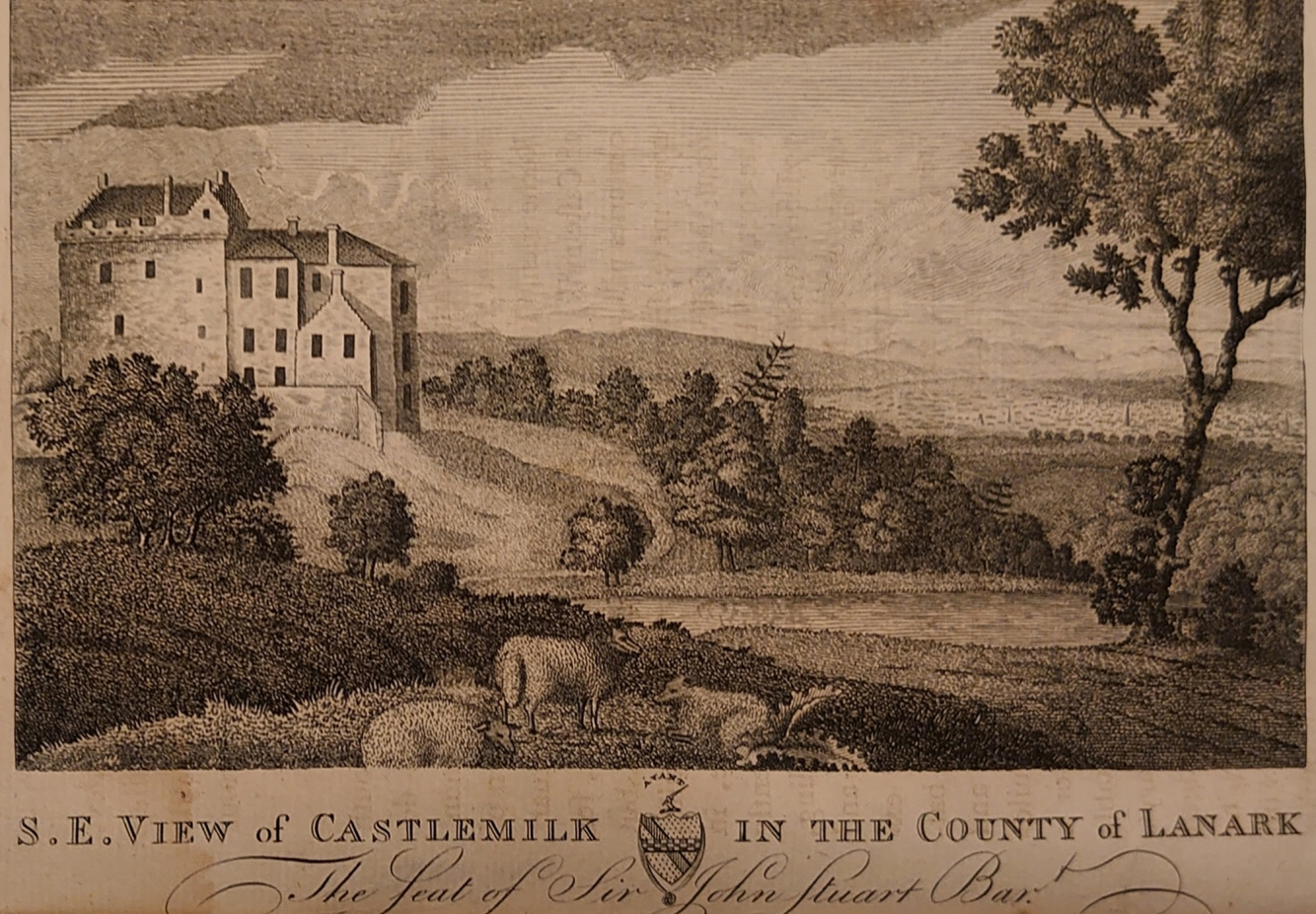
Sketch of Castlemilk published in 1793

The lands of Cassiltoun of Carmunnock, located on high ground south of Glasgow between the hills of the Cathkin Braes and the burgh of Rutherglen near the River Clyde, were acquired by the Stuarts of Castlemilk in Dumfriesshire (an estate near Lockerbie which still exists also featuring a grand mansion) in the 13th century. In the 16th century, they renamed the Cassiltoun estate Castlemilk. Five generations of the Stuart family formed a dynastic baronetcy from the 1660s to the 1790s.

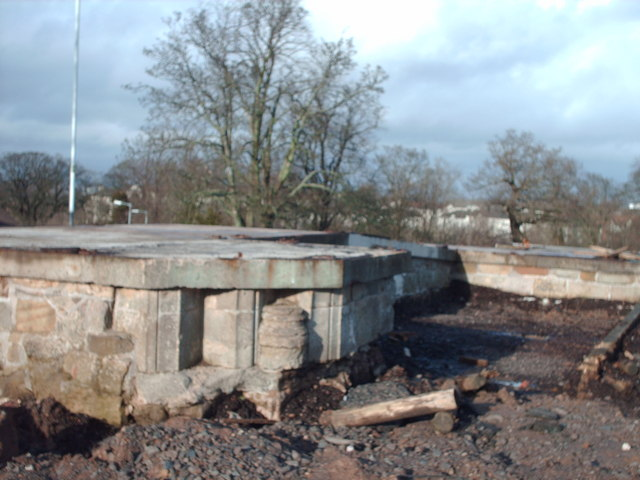
Ruins of Castlemilk House, 2008

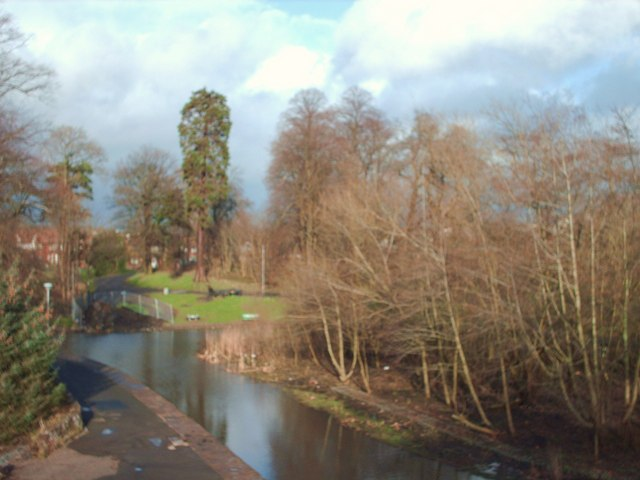
Fish pond in the park, adjacent to the location of the house

In 1937 the 445 hectare (1100 acre) Estate of Castlemilk were acquired by Glasgow Corporation for housing. The estate was acquired under a compulsory purchase order as William Stirling-Stuart, the Laird of Castlemilk, had misgivings over the land being used for high-density housing so far from locations of industry. The outbreak of the Second World War delayed building work on the Castlemilk housing scheme, which was constructed in the 1950s, and soon modern tenements surrounded the house's grounds on all sides.

Castlemilk House was acquired by Glasgow Corporation in 1939, and was used to accommodate evacuees from the city until the end of the war. It was then used as a children's home from 1948 until the expense of maintaining the house forced it to close in January 1969. Castlemilk House was demolished in 1972; a children's play area now occupies the site. In the 21st century the many green areas between the clusters of housing, including the remaining features of the rural estate, are managed as Castlemilk Park and Woodlands, an award-winning project aimed to benefit the community.

=== Castlemilk Stables ===
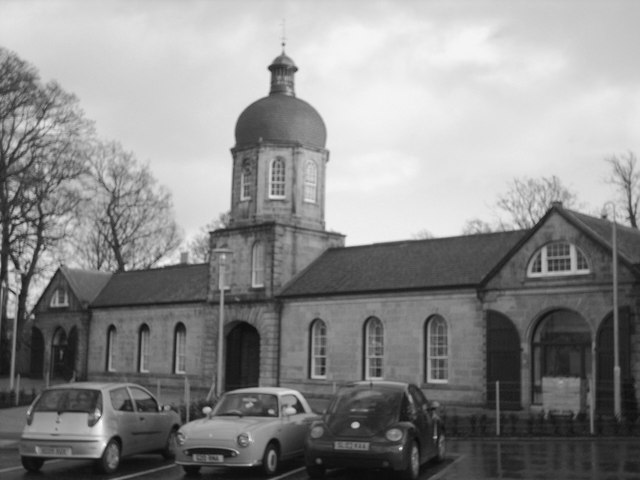
Restored stable block

Other than a small park featuring the landscaped fish pond and a stone bridge (1833, Category B listed) which once formed the driveway to the mansion, and the entrance gateways which are sited to the north-east on the edge of Rutherglen, the accompanying stables block (built 1794, designed by David Hamilton, also Category B listed) is the main surviving legacy of the grand estate. After being damaged by a fire in 1994 and left abandoned, it was restored in 2007 (with the project winning awards) and now contains the local housing offices, community facilities and a nursery.

== See also ==
- Calderglen Country Park (East Kilbride): built around Torrance House estate, owned by the same family
