= British Ropes F.C. =

British Ropes
- Full name: British Ropes Football Club
- Founded: 1949

British Ropes F.C. was an English football club from Retford, Nottinghamshire.

== History ==
The club joined the Central Alliance in 1949 and finished 3rd in their opening season. They left the Alliance in 1957 after struggling at the bottom of the table for three years – Matlock Town's record win is their 11–0 win over British Ropes in February 1957.

The club joined the Yorkshire Football League in 1958 but after three years in Division Two they resigned from that league too. They joined the Doncaster Senior League, winning the Premier Division title in 1970.
