= List of local nature reserves in Scotland =

This is a list of local nature reserves in Scotland.

- Aberlady Bay
- Ardeer Quarry
- Ardersier Common
- Arnhall Moss
- Backmuir Woods
- Balquhidderock Wood
- Birnie and Gaddon Lochs
- Bingham's Pond
- Bishop Loch
- Blantyre, Bothwell and Uddingston
- Bonnyfield Nature Park
- Braedale Hill
- Broughty Ferry
- Brownsburn
- Burdiehouse Burn Valley Park
- Cadzow Glen
- Cambusnethan Woodland
- Cammo Estate
- Cardowan Moss
- Carron Dams
- Castle and Hightae Lochs
- Castlemilk Woodlands
- Cathkin Braes
- Catrine Voes and Woodlands
- Cleddans Burn
- Commonhead Moss
- Corstorphine Hill
- Coul Den
- Coves Community Park
- Cranhill Park
- Croftfoot
- Cullaloe
- Dalbeath Marsh
- Dams to Darnley
- Dawsholm Park
- Den of Maidencraig
- Donmouth
- Duchess Wood
- Dumbreck Marsh
- Durrockstock Park
- Easter Craiglockhart Hill
- Early Braes
- Easter Inch Moss and Seafield Law
- Eden Estuary
- Fernbrae Meadows
- Festival Park
- Findhorn Bay
- Garscadden Burn
- Garscadden Wood
- Gartcosh
- Gartmorn Dam
- Gillingshill Reservoir
- Greenhall, Millheugh & Barnhill
- Greenhead Moss and Perchy Pond
- Hamilton Low Parks
- Hamiltonhill Claypits
- Happy Valley
- Hermitage of Braid / Blackford Hill
- Hogganfield Park
- Holmhills Wood Community Park
- Holy Loch
- Hurlet Hill
- Inner Tay Estuary
- James Hamilton Heritage Park
- Jenny's Well
- Jock's Burn
- Kilmardinny Loch
- Kincorth Hill
- Kingshill
- Kinneil Foreshore
- Langlands Moss
- Lenzie Moss
- Linn Park
- Loch Stiapabhat
- Malls Mire
- Meadows Yard
- Merkinch
- Merklands
- Milton
- Montrose Basin
- Morgan Glen
- Mossneuk
- Mosswater
- Mull Head
- Neilsland and Earnock
- Paisley Moss
- Ravelston Woods
- Ravenswood
- Riverside Nature Park
- Robroyston Park
- Scotstown Moor
- Stevenston Beach
- Stonehouse Park
- Straiton Pond
- The Saltings
- Todd's Well
- Torry Bay
- Trottick Mill Ponds
- Udston and Glenlee Woods
- Waters of Philorth
- Wemyss Bay Woodland
- Westburn
- Wigtown Bay

== See also ==
- List of local nature reserves in England
- List of local nature reserves in Wales
