= Burnside, South Lanarkshire =

Coordinates: 55.81846°N 4.201981°W

Burnside
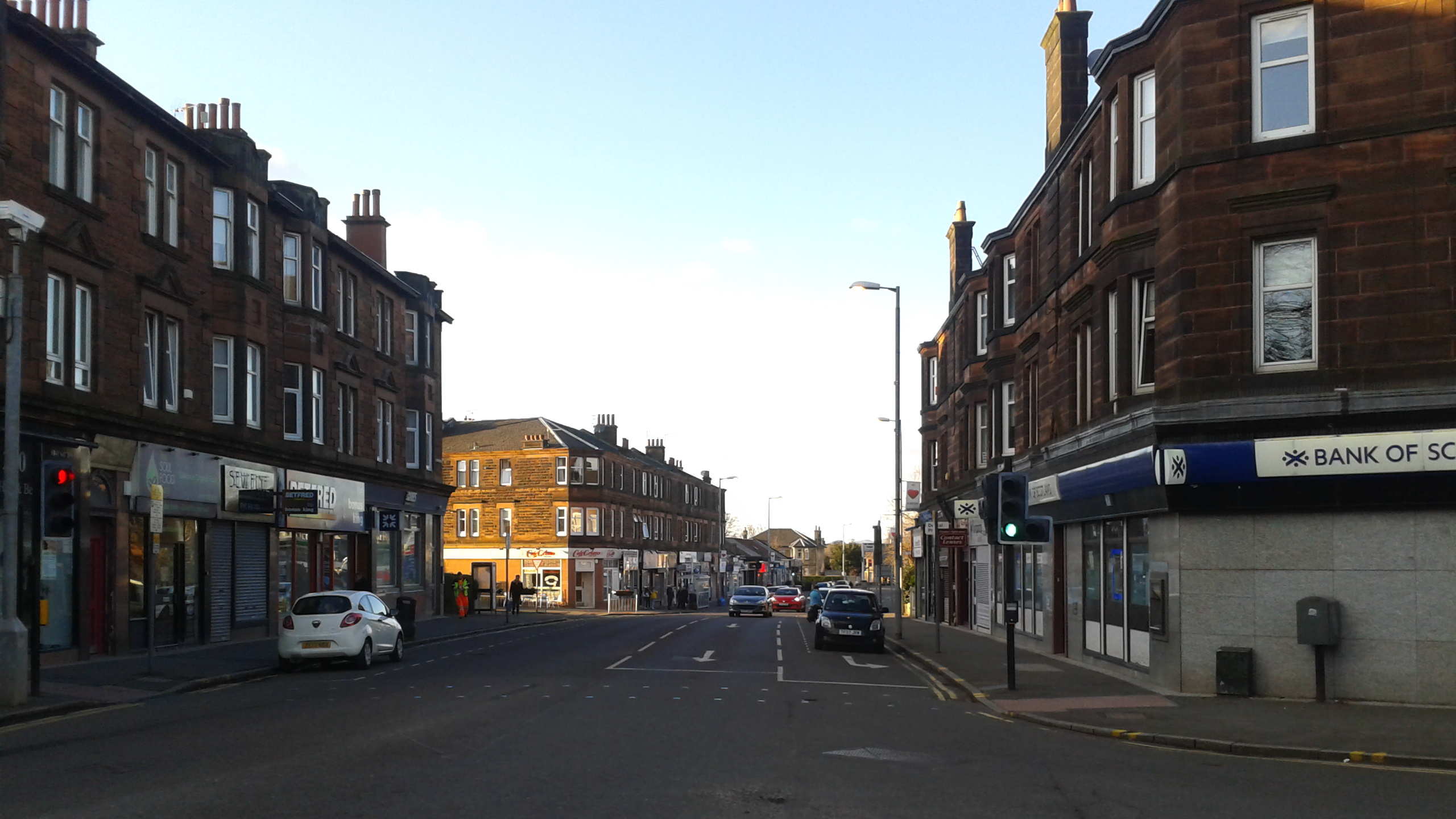
- Stonelaw Road looking north

- Location within Scotland Burnside (Scotland)
- Country: Scotland
- Sovereign state: United Kingdom
- Post town: GLASGOW
- Postcode district: G73
- Dialling code: 0141
- Police: Scotland
- Fire: Scottish
- Ambulance: Scottish
- UK Parliament: Rutherglen
- Scottish Parliament: Rutherglen

Burnside is a mostly residential area in the town of Rutherglen in South Lanarkshire, Scotland. Including the neighbourhoods of High Burnside and High Crosshill, respectively south and north-west of its main street, it borders Overtoun Park in Rutherglen plus several other residential areas of the town (Blairbeth, Cathkin, Eastfield, Fernhill, Springhall and Stonelaw), as well as western parts of neighbouring Cambuslang.

Burnside is the largest component of the Rutherglen South ward of South Lanarkshire Council, which has an overall population of around 15,000.

== History ==
Burnside grew as an affluent commuter suburb in the early 20th century following the establishment of the railway station, and although within the boundaries of Rutherglen it became established separately from the older burgh and has thus retained a distinct identity. The post-World War II housing estates which subsequently surrounded Burnside to the south and west were built to alleviate housing problems in central Rutherglen and in Cambuslang, so although physically adjacent were never seen as parts of Burnside as such; in the same vein, the nearby Castlemilk housing scheme is situated close to Rutherglen and Burnside and shared the same administration in times past when it was a rural estate, but was constructed by Glasgow Corporation for residents being rehoused from the inner city and has never had a formal connection to the neighbouring town.

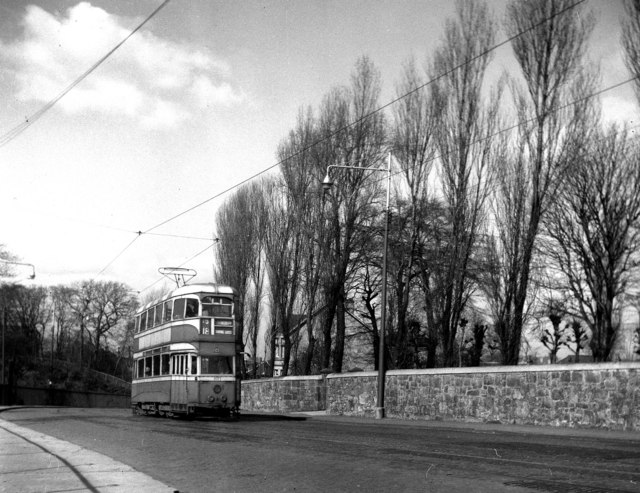
'Coronation' style tram (No 18) travelling south on Stonelaw Road at Stonelaw Woods, 1960

The local park, Stonelaw Woods, was landscaped from a disused quarry and named after the most prominent historic landmark in the area, the castellated Stonelaw Tower, a converted 18th-century coal mine winding engine house which fell into disrepair – after subsidence in the vicinity caused by the mining – and was demolished in the 1960s to be replaced by apartments and a petrol station (also since demolished), with only a boundary wall remaining.

The origin of the name, Burnside Farm, is located some distance south of the centre of the modern settlement, being uphill closer to Fernhill and Cathkin – the farmhouse still exists, located off Beech Drive, while the burn in question runs north-west past the Blairbeth and Spittal neighbourhoods, concealed in parts, before merging with another originating near Castlemilk and flowing through Rutherglen, entering the River Clyde at Richmond Park (Oatlands). The farm also gave its name to Burnside Loch, used for boating and curling but drained in the 1920s and now the playing fields for two primary schools located in the Springhall housing estate (including Loch Primary, which today has no visual indication as to why it was so named). Other local farms included High Crosshill at the entrance of Glenlui Avenue at Burnside Primary School, no trace remaining; Stonelaw, adjacent to the tower, no trace remaining; and Fishescoats off East Kilbride Road, the buildings for which were retained by a funeral director's business.

There were various stages of housebuilding, with the earliest properties among the largest at High Burnside in the vicinity of Lower Bourtree Drive and Lochbrae Drive in the late 19th century, followed by the grid of streets at High Crosshill and the similar sandstone villas at Buchanan Drive, plus the tenements on the main road in the 1900s, then more at High Burnside (Thorn Drive / Tynwald Avenue / St Stephen's Avenue) and on the old golf course around Crawfurd Road post-World War I. Land to the east of Stonelaw Road was also occupied in the 1920s, with a development of quartered villas and bungalows at Southhill Avenue towards the yet unbuilt Eastfield, thereafter mainly semi-detached homes in the triangular plot of land at Dukes Road / Brownside Road, and another set of quartered villas and bungalows on the inclines around Bradda Avenue / Blairbeth Road; these latter areas (including Burnside Church and bowling club) were historically within the civil parish of Cambuslang but were always more closely associated with the amenities of central Burnside, located within the boundaries of Rutherglen along with Springhall and Blairbeth (but unlike Spittal, Cathkin and Fernhill which were in Carmunnock parish). The last major residential project at Upper Bourtree Drive / Larchfield Drive in the 1970s 'joined' the existing parts of High Burnside and meant the vast majority of the territory was now built upon, with all subsequent modern developments being on a far smaller scale.

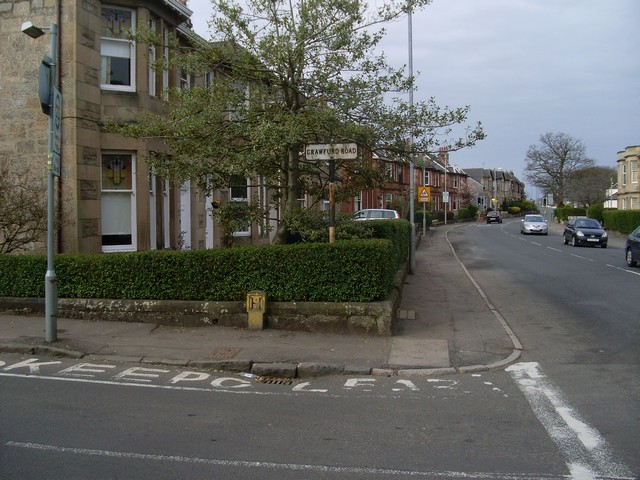
Sandstone villas on Blairbeth Road

Previously, Burnside had its own cinema on Stonelaw Road, the Rhul Cinema. Built in 1932 by the Burnside Picture House Company, the cinema was sold to ABC in 1936 and later demolished in 1960. The space is now occupied by a supermarket, which was previously operated by Safeway, Morrisons and Somerfield, but is presently a Tesco, who purchased the store in 2010 and completed a comprehensive redevelopment.

On the western side of Burnside, overlooking Rutherglen Cemetery and immediately north of the railway tracks, is Blairtum House, built in 1878 for the owner of a rope works at Farme Cross and adorned with rope-related features in its stonework. It was owned in the 1900s by George Gray, Town Clerk of Rutherglen, and later was a care home for the elderly and YMCA-run accommodation for homeless teenagers before being converted as the centrepiece of an upmarket residential development, surviving a major fire during the process in 2016. The high ground immediately north of Blairtum is presumed by W. R. Shearer in Rutherglen Lore (1922) to have been the location of a large mediaeval stone cross placed in a prominent position and from which the Crosshill name is derived, although other sources suggest the cross may have been further west at Bankhead, where there is a Crosshill Farm.

=== Burnside Blairbeth Church ===
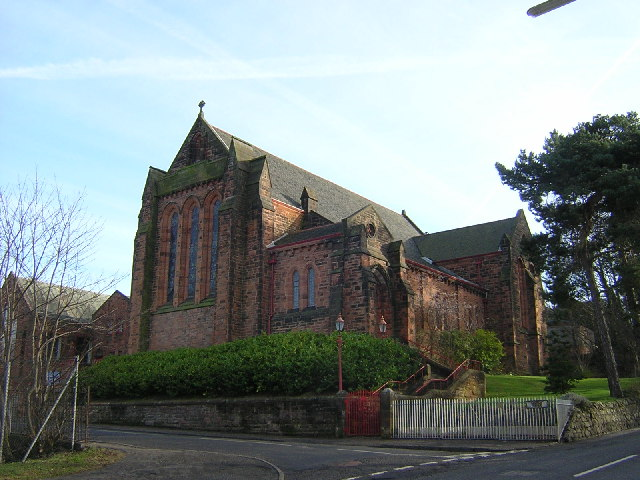
Burnside Blairbeth Church

The Burnside church was established in 1928 and initially operated out of temporary buildings. Plans for a permanent structure were postponed by World War II, but by the time the conflict ended, a merger had taken place between two congregations based within a few blocks of one another in the Pollokshields area of Glasgow, who chose to use the Sherbrooke Church going forward, leaving the St Gilbert's Church buildings (completed in 1911) unoccupied. They were dismantled brick-by-brick and transported to a new home at Burnside, 5 miles (8.0 km) away, the process completed in 1954.

The premises are Category B listed and feature stained glass windows designed by the noted craftsman Oscar Paterson. The sanctuary was completely refurbished in 2002, around the same time as a merger took place between the congregations of Burnside and the Blairbeth Parish Church, with the 1950s building of the latter on Drumliaw Road still used as a secondary site for services and clubs.

In 2005, the Rev. David Easton retired after serving as minister there for 28 years. In September 2006, William Wilson was inducted to the vacant charge. Aside from two Sunday Services, there are Sunday Clubs for children and The Way, a club for secondary school students. The Blairbeth building, Roger Memorial, has Storykeepers club for P1s to P3s and Megaquest for P4s to P7s.

== Amenities ==
Stonelaw Road (part of the A749) is the heart of Burnside and home to a supermarket and a range of other local businesses and cafés (as well as several estate agents, having become the main concentration of the industry's branches for the south-east of Glasgow). It is also on several bus routes (First Glasgow services 18 to Buchanan Bus Station / East Kilbride and 7A to the St Enoch Centre / Cambuslang, and the 14 McGill 'Ruglen Rambler' service to Rutherglen town centre / Fernhill). Burnside railway station, as part of the Cathcart Circle Lines, is served by half-hourly, seven-day services between Newton and Glasgow Central via Mount Florida or Langside.

In education, the area is served by ACE Place Nursery and Out of School Care, Oakwood House Nursery, Burnside Primary School, Loch Primary School, St Anthony's Primary School, (both Springhall), St Marks Primary School (Blairbeth), Calderwood Primary School, Stonelaw High School (both near Eastfield) and Fernhill School (Fernhill). The primary schools were rebuilt in the early 21st century. Some of the newest housing in the area, on Greystone Avenue, was previously the site of a special school.

=== Scouts ===
Burnside is home to two Scout Groups: the 185th (Glasgow Rutherglen, established 1929) are based in Burnside Church Halls on Church Avenue. The 113th (Glasgow Burnside, established 1909) are based in a dedicated Scout Hall on Crawfurd Road.

=== Sports ===
There is one tennis club in the area; for many years there had been two, but Burnside LTC – based adjacent to the parish church – closed down in the 2010s after nearly a century of operation and its courts fell into disuse, being taken over and refurbished by their former rival, Rutherglen LTC, based on Viewpark Drive. Founded in 1922, Rutherglen was awarded as the best club in the country by Tennis Scotland for both 2016 and 2017, the latter success attributed to the work on the Burnside courts. In 2020, they announced plans to rebuild the clubhouse at their Viewpark site and to restore the derelict courts at nearby Overtoun Park; the latter proposal stalled in 2022 due to a funding issue.

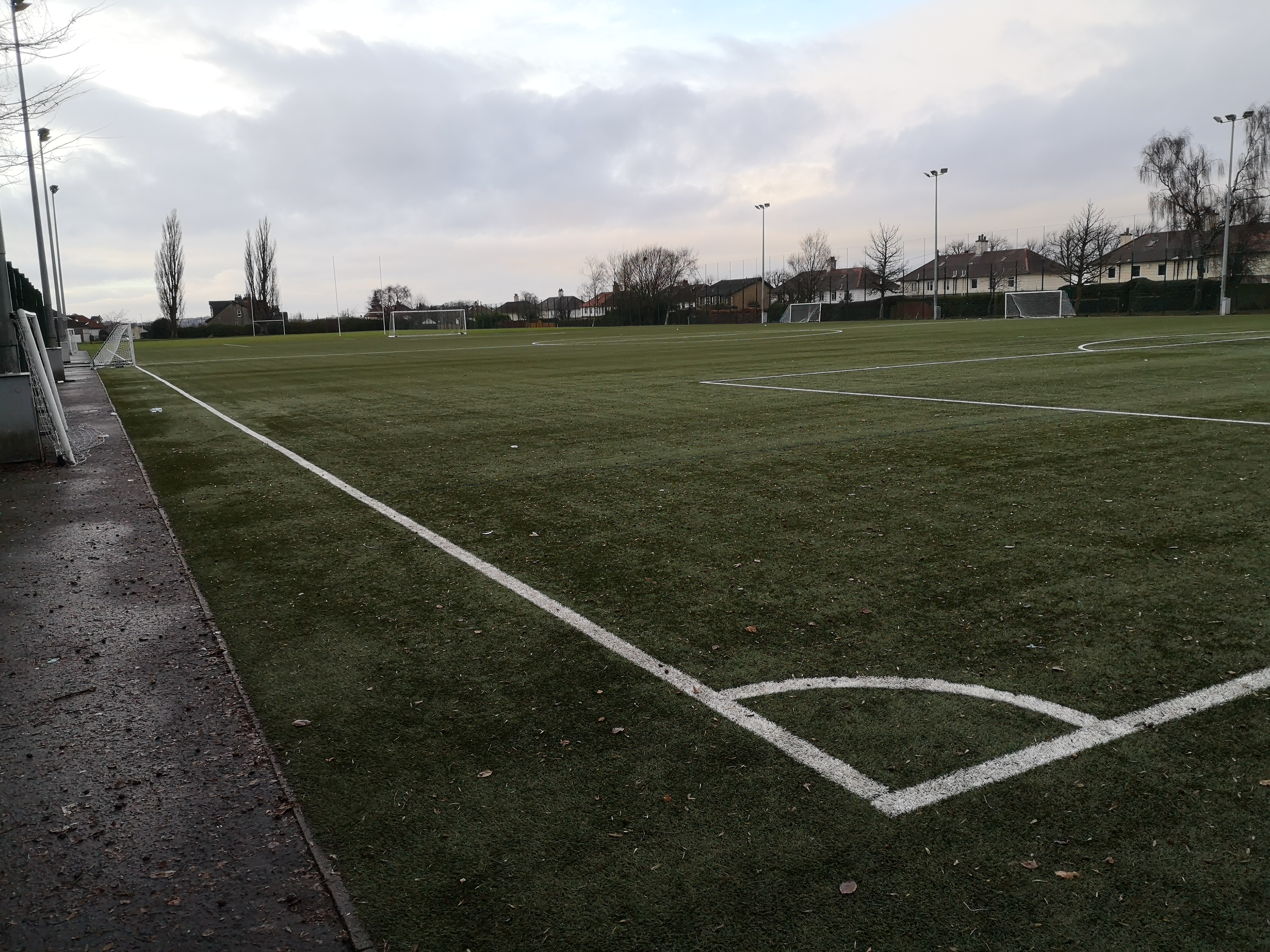
Stonelaw High School playing fields

On the eastern periphery of Burnside, Stonelaw High School has a 'Community Wing' with sports facilities and hall as well as an AstroTurf football pitch, installed adjacent to the school's new buildings a year before the move was completed in 1998 – this land was previously the recreation grounds for the James Templeton & Co textile company in Glasgow, and the bowling club bearing the Templeton name at that location continues on its own. Burnside Bowling Club (1909) is located next to the old Burnside tennis courts and there are other bowling clubs on the border with central Rutherglen (on Stonelaw Road and in Overtoun Park).

Burnside also borders Cambuslang Rugby Club's Coats Park ground, situated next to the railway lines off Brownside Road (and adjacent to a colliery which operated from 1928 to 1958).

==== Golf ====
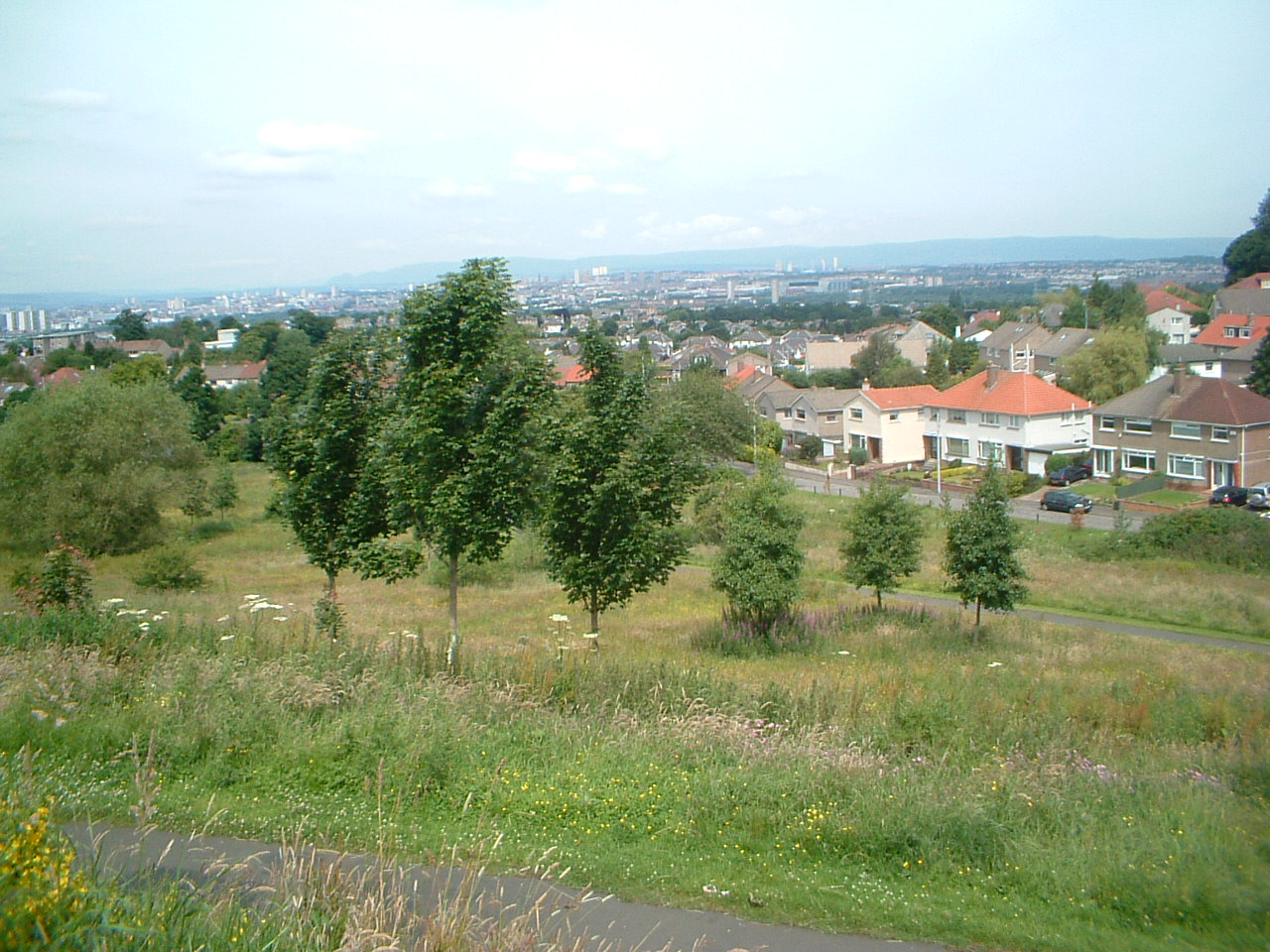
Approximate location of Blairbeth Golf Club's second course between High Burnside and Fernhill

Cathkin Braes Golf Club (founded 1888) and Kirkhill Golf Club (founded 1910) are situated in the green belt a short distance to the south of Burnside. The area's other golf club, Blairbeth, closed in 2015 and was converted to a park, named Fernbrae Meadows. Blairbeth was the Burnside club by geography, having been founded in 1910 with the first course on the slopes to the south of the railway station, before relocating further south due housebuilding around Crawford Road (reflected in the street name of Golf Road in this area); the second course had its small clubhouse at today's Larchfield Drive and the course over the land of Bowhouse Farm which became the northern part of Fernhill housing scheme in the 1950s, as well as the open ground eventually used for the Cathkin Relief Road in the 2010s. Fernhill's construction caused the golf club to move south again, taking over the isolated former Mill Farm on the county boundary with Castlemilk as a clubhouse in 1956, where it remained until closure 60 years later.
