= Cathcart Castle =

Castle in Glasgow City, Scotland

Coordinates: 55.8130°N 4.2563°W

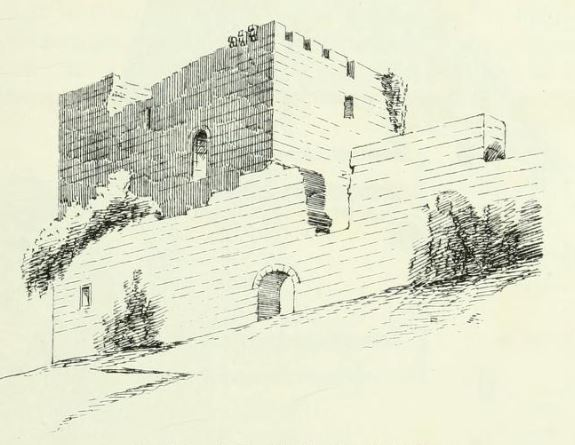
- Cathcart Castle from the south-east circa. 1887
- Interactive map of the Cathcart Castle area

General information
- Location: Glasgow, Cathcart, Scotland
- Completed: Mid 15th century
- Demolished: 1980

Cathcart Castle was a 15th-century castle, located in what is now Linn Park in the Cathcart area of southern Glasgow, Scotland. The castle was abandoned in the 18th century, and the remaining ruins were pulled down in 1980, leaving only foundations visible.

== History ==
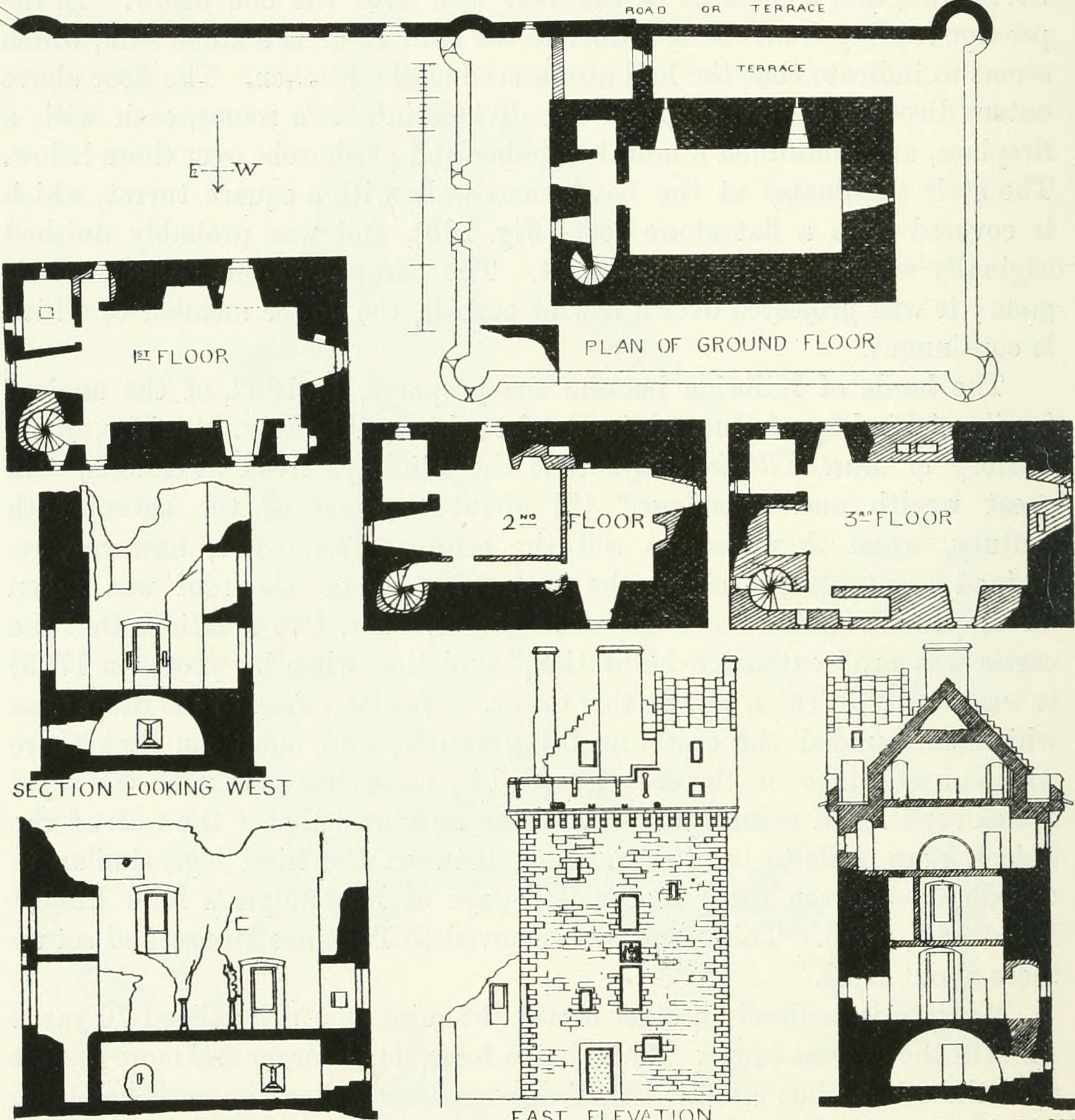
A plan of the castle published in 1887

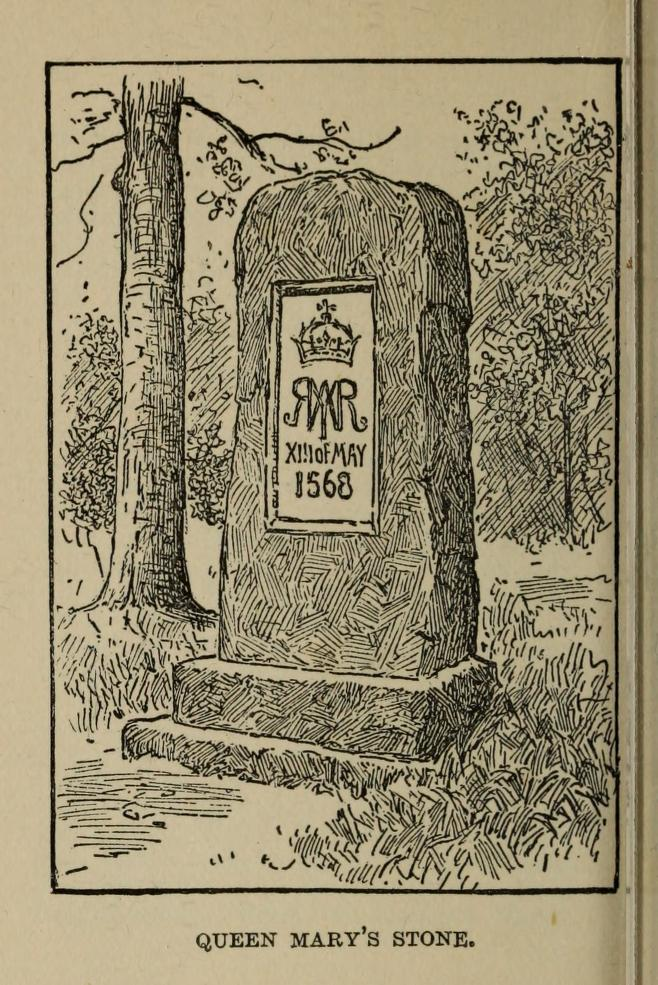
Queen Mary's Stone at Cathcart Castle in 1900

The lands of Cathcart were held by the family of that name from the 12th century. In the mid-15th century, the head of the family was raised to the peerage as Lord Cathcart, and it is believed that the castle was built at around this time. In 1546 the castle passed to the Semple family. It is highly unlikely that Mary, Queen of Scots, would have spent the night before the Battle of Langside (1568) at Cathcart Castle or have watched the battle from a nearby hill called the Court Knowe. The Semples were supporters of Mary's enemies and would have captured her and put an end to her plans before the battle had started. Court Knowe is some 15 m below the height of Langside village, where the battle took place, meaning Mary would not have been able to see what took place. A more likely site would have been Prospecthill, which lies on the line of her army's approach to Langside.

An alternative version of the story has the Queen living with her kinsfolk, the Stuarts of Castlemilk, whose defensive stronghold at the foot of the Cathkin Braes contained a chamber later known as Queen Mary's Room, where Her Majesty supposedly lodged on the night before the Battle of Langside. The ceiling of this room was ornamented with the arms of the Stuart monarchs of Scotland. This is also unlikely, as Mary spent the preceding week at Hamilton, where 6,000 troops gathered.

In 1740 the Semples built Cathcart House, also since demolished, nearby, and moved out of the castle, leaving it to ruin. The newly created 1st Earl Cathcart bought back his ancestral home in 1814, although with the intention of selling off the stone rather than living in it. In 1866 the castle was still standing to five storeys, and was surrounded by outbuildings. The lands around the castle were purchased by Glasgow City Council in 1927, and added to Linn Park. In 1980 the remaining ruins were pronounced dangerous, and were pulled down by the council. The site is now a Scheduled Monument.

== Architecture ==
The castle was built on the rocky north-east bank of the White Cart Water. It comprised a rectangular tower house, 15.5 by 9 m (51 by 30 ft), of five storeys including a vaulted basement. This was supplemented by a curtain wall, enclosing a small barmkin approximately 22 by 15 m (72 by 49 ft), with the tower at the centre. The curtain wall had round corner towers, and a twin-towered gatehouse to the east. The foundations of the tower house remain to around 1 m (3 ft) high. Earthworks to the west of the castle have been interpreted as the remains of an outer bailey or ringwork.

During archaeological investigations a fragmentary plaster armorial dating from the 1630s with the arms of Bryce Semple and Jean Lauder of Hatton was discovered. This seems to have been part of a fireplace overmantle and ceiling in the hall of the tower.
