= Fernhill, South Lanarkshire =

Coordinates: 55.80813°N 4.20652°W

Fernhill
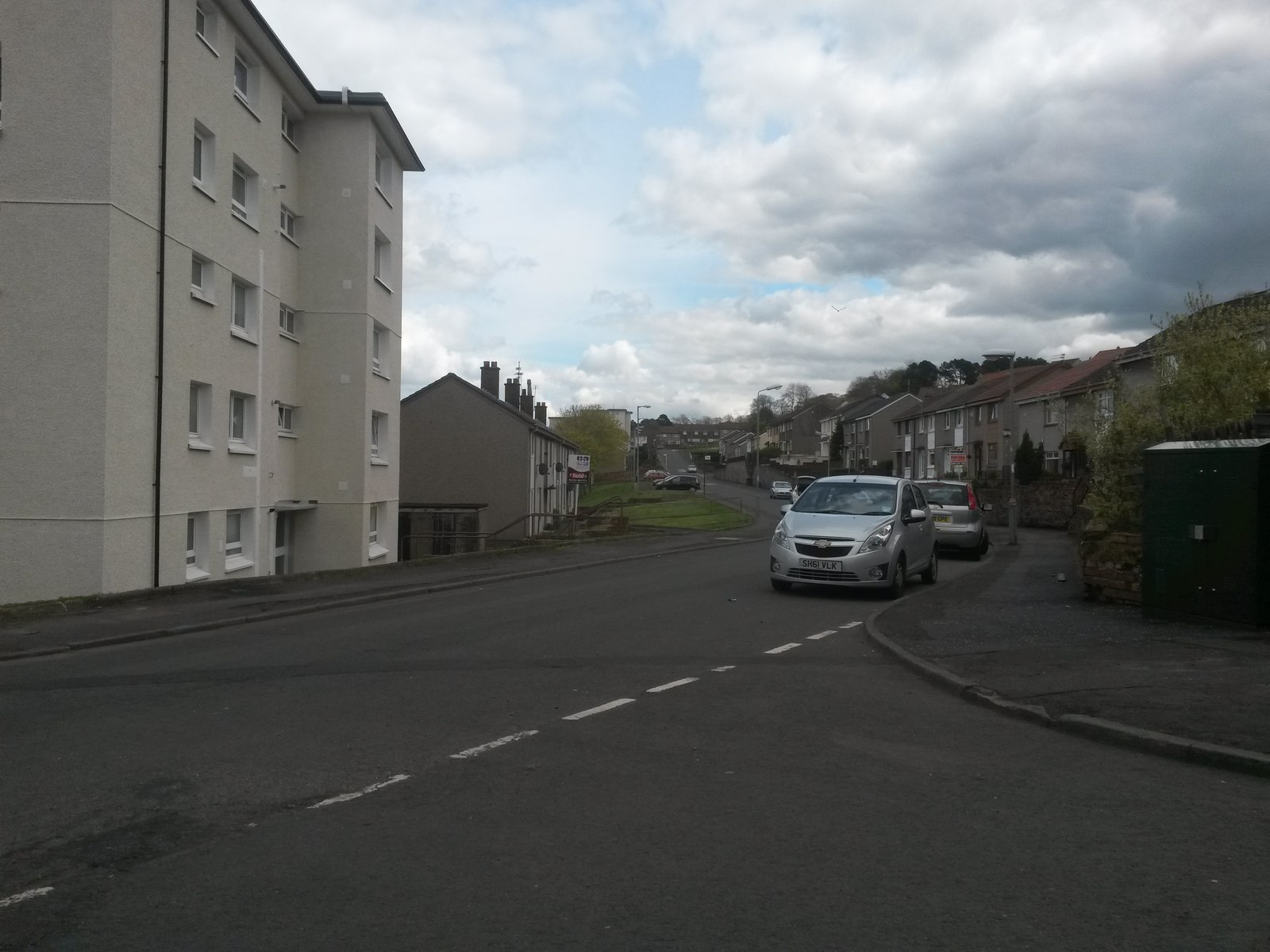
- Castlefern Road, Fernhill (2015)

- Location within Scotland Fernhill (Scotland)
- Population: 2,200 (2018)
- OS grid reference: NS61815941
- Country: Scotland
- Sovereign state: United Kingdom
- Post town: GLASGOW
- Postcode district: G73 4
- Dialling code: 0141
- Police: Scotland
- Fire: Scottish
- Ambulance: Scottish
- UK Parliament: Rutherglen
- Scottish Parliament: Rutherglen

Fernhill is a residential neighbourhood in the Scottish town of Rutherglen in South Lanarkshire; it is situated south of the River Clyde and borders the Rutherglen neighbourhoods of High Burnside to the north and Cathkin to the east, the Glasgow district of Castlemilk to the west, and the open lands of Fernbrae Meadows (formerly Blairbeth Golf Club which closed in 2015) to the south. Its location on a steep incline which is part of the Cathkin Braes range of hills offers panoramic views over the south and eastern parts of Greater Glasgow.

Fernhill is within the Rutherglen South ward of South Lanarkshire Council which is also the extent of the neighbourhood community policing zone; local councillors include the politician Robert Brown.

== History ==
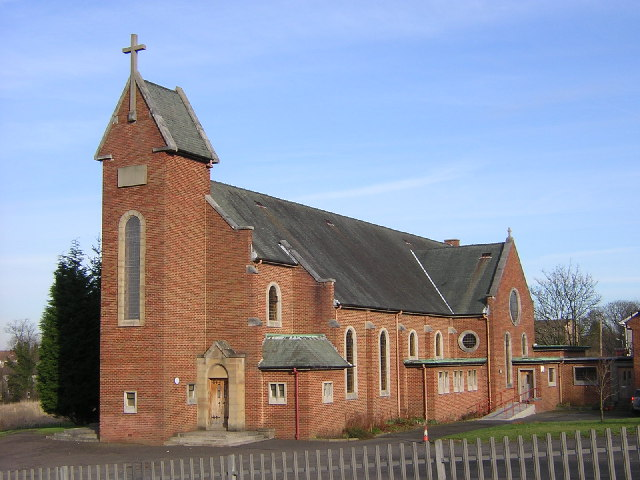
St. Marks RC Church at the western side of Fernhill

Until about 1950, the territory of Fernhill was open fields to the south of Rutherglen outwith the boundaries of the town (instead falling under the civil parish of Carmunnock), overlooked by a large mansion, Fernhill House, constructed around 1870.

In order to alleviate overcrowding and housing shortages in central Rutherglen, the town council identified and purchased the territory for a housing scheme. Construction took place over the late 1950s and 1960s, consisting of terraced and semi-detached houses as well as apartments and maisonettes in traditional tenement-style buildings and standalone flat-roofed blocks. A few years later, the construction of a Dual carriageway bypass road through central Rutherglen caused further housing issues there; road access to Fernhill to reach the new housing became easier, but the bypass intended to connect to the A749 dual carriageway to East Kilbride was not completed, with traffic having to use existing minor roads in the south of the town, including Fernhill Road.

The edge-of-town development has some similarities with the much larger Castlemilk housing estate in Glasgow which borders Fernhill immediately to the west and was built around the same time for similar reasons. Residents of Fernhill and Castlemilk have suffered as a result of antisocial behaviour and territorial violence between rival youth gangs, although in recent years this has been tackled and the situation appears to be improving.

The boundary between the two areas, which also separates the Glasgow and South Lanarkshire local authority zones, is known as the 'Hole in the wall', a historic term referring to an opening between fields on a drover's route across the undeveloped countryside. Today this is the site of one of the area's main landmarks, a whitewashed statue by Kenny Hunter of a boy with binoculars and cape looking downhill towards Glasgow. A motto below the statue reads "Somewhere in the distance... Is My Future" .

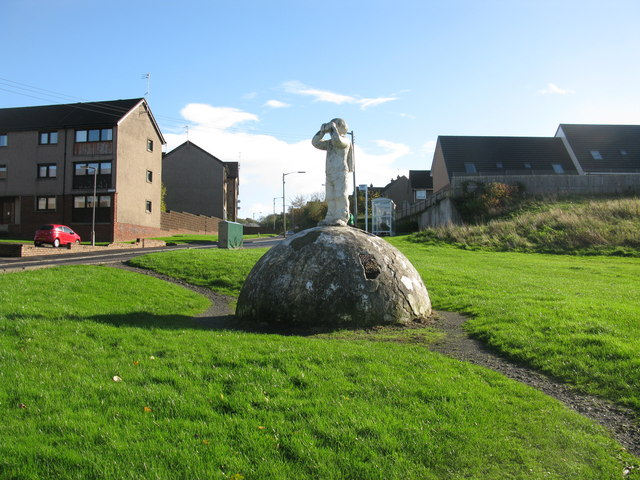
King of the Castle / Boy Wonder statue on the boundary between Fernhill and Castlemilk (Kenny Hunter, 2000)

In common with many urban neighbourhoods in the UK, the area suffered over decades from a lack of employment opportunities and underinvestment, leading to social problems and deterioration in some of its housing stock and amenities. Improvements to Fernhill in the 21st century as part of a regeneration masterplan included the opening of a new Community and Sports Centre in 2011 (replacing the outdated pavilion on the same site), energy efficiency improvements and recladding of the 'cube' blocks, murals to brighten public areas the rebuilding of local shops on the main road in 2014, and the demolition of the deck-access maisonettes which were replaced modern houses with gardens.

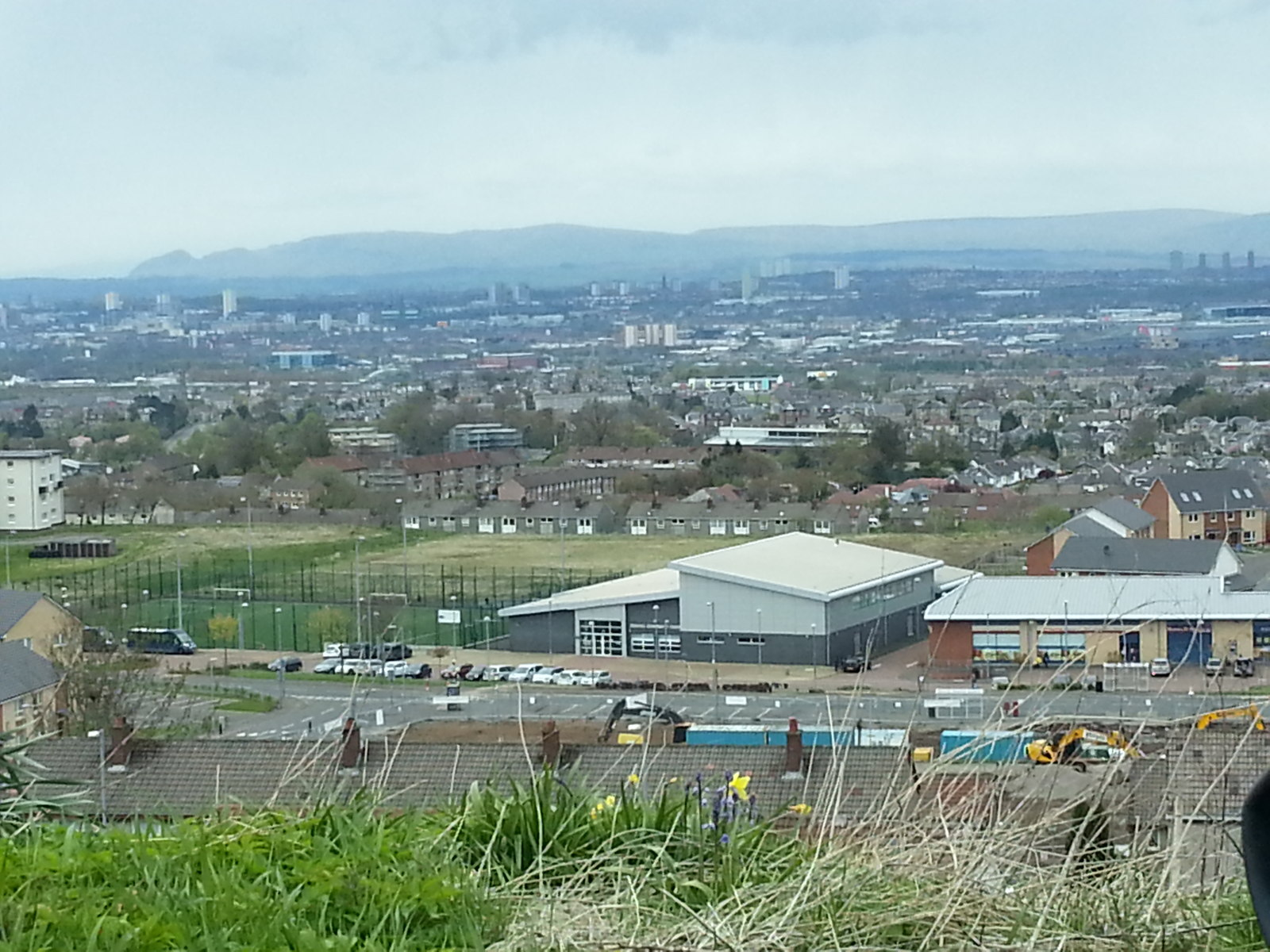
View looking north from the highest point in Fernhill over the local community centre, with Rutherglen and Glasgow beyond

In summer 2017, plans were outlined for the creation of an urban park on the lands of Blairbeth Golf Club, in addition to areas of new housing. Named Fernbrae Meadows after a local consultation, the park was formally opened in June 2019.

=== Cathkin Relief Road ===
In 2014, the local council released plans to complete the Rutherglen bypass road (see above) along the north side of Fernhill to better link Glasgow to East Kilbride and alleviate pressure on traffic along other routes including Fernhill Road. However the 'Cathkin Relief Road' project faced considerable local opposition as the undeveloped land earmarked for the road had been used as an informal park by locals for many years, and it was also felt this new road could isolate Fernhill from the other nearby communities. Ultimately these concerns were disregarded and the project was approved in late 2015; work began on the site in 2016 and was completed in 2017, however the company responsible for its maintenance collapsed soon afterwards. Two years later, a legal action for compensation was submitted by nearby residents due to noise and air pollution.

The bypass, including the new section which was named Willow Boulevard, was subsequently re-designated as part of the A730 road between the southern end of the Rutherglen dual carriageway at Spittal and the East Kilbride Road roundabout at Cathkin, in place of the residential Blairbeth Road (which in turn was re-labelled as a continuation of the B762 between King's Park Avenue and Dukes Road).

== Facilities ==
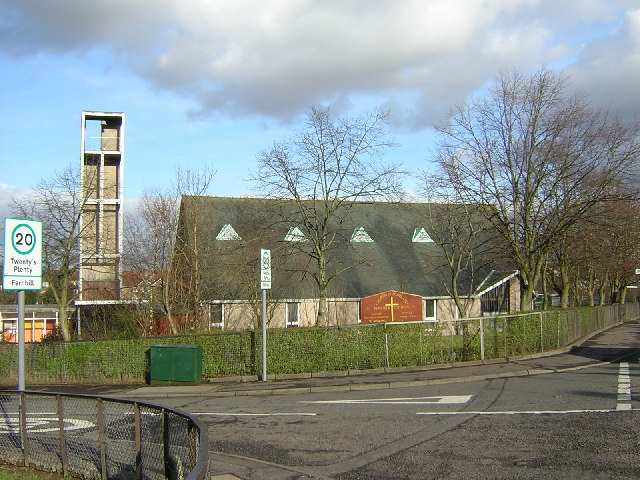
Fernhill & Cathkin Church

There are two places of worship at either end of the main road through the district: St. Marks RC Church at the west side, and Fernhill & Cathkin Church (of Scotland) at the east side.

There is a regular public bus service running along Fernhill Road, linking the community to Rutherglen, central Glasgow and East Kilbride. The nearest train station is Burnside which is approximately one mile (two kilometres) away via a steep hill.

There are no local authority schools in Fernhill itself – the closest primary schools are in Cathkin (Cathkin Primary) and Blairbeth (St. Marks RC Primary) and affiliated to Cathkin High School and Trinity High School respectively; however it is the location of one of the more prestigious fee-paying educational institutions in Scotland, Fernhill School who have their premises at the highest point of the incline at the southern edge of the district – the main building is the historic Fernhill House which is Category C listed and the oldest surviving structure in the area.
