= Simshill =

District of Glasgow, Scotland

Coordinates: 55°48′36″N 4°15′03″W

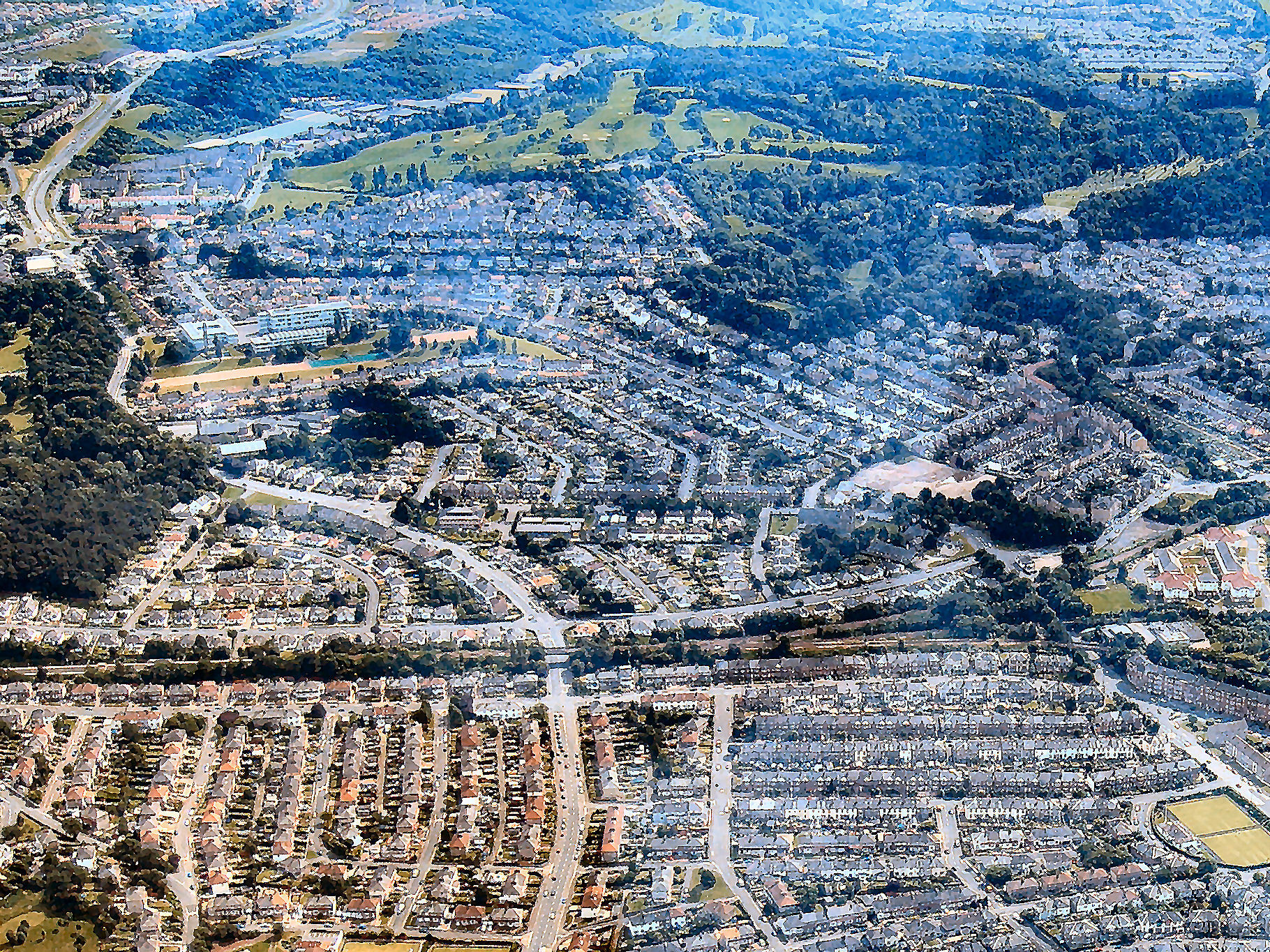
Aerial view looking south towards Simshill, with the green areas of King's Park (left) and Linn Park visible (2010)

Simshill is an area of Glasgow, Scotland. It is on the South Side of the city, approximately 3.7 miles (6.0 km) south of the city centre. Adjacent areas are Cathcart, King's Park, Croftfoot and Castlemilk. Linn Park is to the south-west of Simshill.

The area had a high concentration of residents of Irish heritage in the postwar period, as members of the city's Irish community moved out to the suburbs from the inner city Gorbals.

King's Park Secondary School is in the immediate area. Two other primary schools are close by: St Fillan's and St Mirin's.

Parish of Christ the King Glasgow, a Catholic church, is in the neighborhood. It is adjacent to St. Mirin's Primary School, and it is the church that is used by St. Fillan's and St. Mirin's.

Former residents of Simshill include Sir Alex Ferguson, Carol Smillie, and Alistair Albert Gray.
