= King's Park, Glasgow =

District of Glasgow, Scotland

Coordinates: 55.821°N 4.241°W

King's Park: Scottish Gaelic: Pàirc Rìgh; Scots: Keeng's Pairk
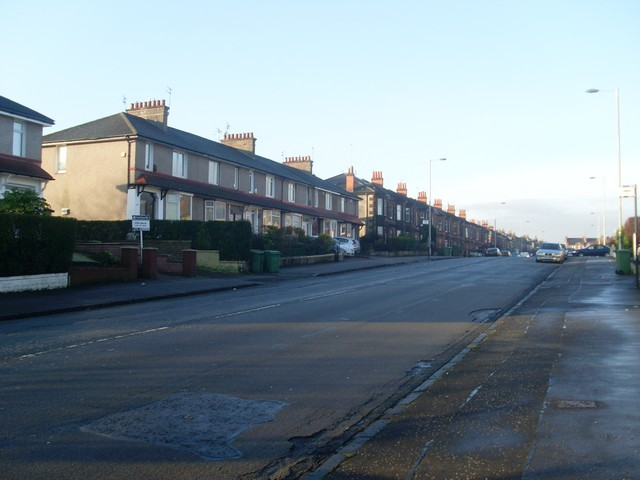
- Typical housing on King's Park Avenue

- Location within Glasgow
- OS grid reference: NS596608
- Council area: Glasgow City Council
- Lieutenancy area: Glasgow
- Country: Scotland
- Sovereign state: United Kingdom
- Post town: GLASGOW
- Postcode district: G44
- Dialling code: 0141
- Police: Scotland
- Fire: Scottish
- Ambulance: Scottish
- UK Parliament: Glasgow South
- Scottish Parliament: Glasgow Cathcart

King's Park (Scottish Gaelic: Pàirc an Rìgh, Scots: Keeng's Pairk) is a district in the city of Glasgow, Scotland. It is situated south of the River Clyde and borders the Glasgow areas of Croftfoot, Cathcart, Simshill, Mount Florida and Toryglen and the neighbourhood of Bankhead in the adjoining town of Rutherglen.

== History and geography ==
King's Park is a residential area first developed for housing around 1930 a short time after the territory, historically within the civil parish of Cathcart in Renfrewshire, was brought into the city of Glasgow, and retains much of the same appearance in the 21st century. It includes a mixture of semi-detached houses and bungalows, flats (including cottage flats) and luxury detached villas and is considered an affluent suburb of Glasgow, with median house prices and income well above average. In 2014, it was rated one of the most attractive postcode areas to live in Scotland.

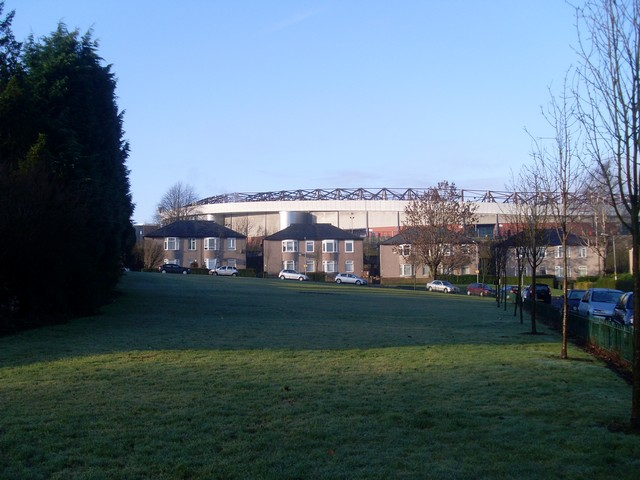
Four-in-a-block houses on King's Park's western periphery, with Hampden Park behind

As of 2005, it had a population of 14,552 residents. The ethnic makeup was approximately 98% White, 0.8% Asian, 0.6% Oriental and 0.6% mixed race. In 2007, residents of the cottage flats in the area were told they would not be entitled to the substantial council tax refunds which had been awarded to householders in almost identical properties in neighbouring Croftfoot, as theirs was considered a more affluent part of the city and consequently the higher payment 'band' applied was correct.

The district was named after the medium-sized park of the same name (68 acres in size) which lies within its boundaries and is also spotted with further green areas rather than entirely built upon. A scrapbook at the Mitchell Library entitled Old Glasgow Street Songs etc and dated to 1850 contains the song: The Dairy Maids Of Hundred-Acre Hill; this hill can be found as a green space in modern-day King's Park, located at Kingsacre Road offering views towards the tower blocks and tenements of Castlemilk from its south-facing slope. There is another green space on the north-facing side of the same incline at Ardmay Crescent which overlooks Scotland's national football stadium Hampden Park, the Toryglen district and the wider Glasgow urban area. Its name is recalled in a local public house, the 100 Acres, which technically is just outside the local authority boundary in Bankhead.

=== Public park ===
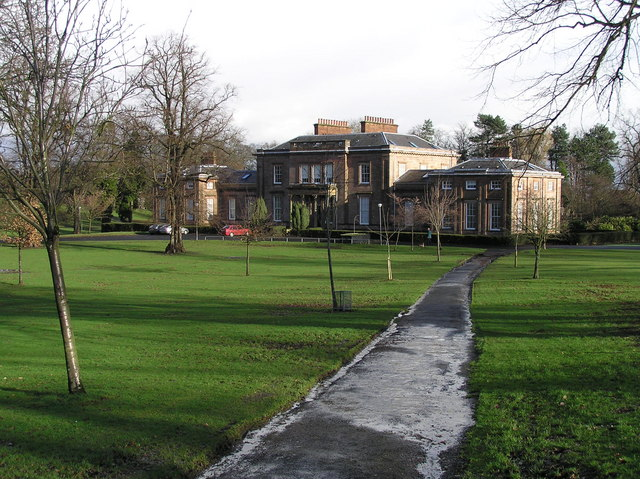
Aikenhead House within King's Park

The "King's Park" after which the area is named features the landmark Aikenhead House, nowadays converted to private apartments and Category A listed. Designed by the architect David Hamilton it was built in 1806 for the West Indies merchant and prominent Glasgow Tory politician, John Gordon. The estate, featuring a walled flower garden, stone sundial and centuries-old trees came into the ownership of the MacTaggart & Mickel housebuilders at the time of the district's construction as a residential suburb, and was donated by them for use as a public park in 1930.

The local 9-hole golf course (a sector of the public park but actually located in Croftfoot which was developed for housing in the same era) was notable for being dug into a hillside 20-35° steep in some places. Donated to the city by the Western Heritable Investment Company which managed the housing and established in 1934, it became derelict and was used as an area of common ground for dog walkers etc. In 2020, the local authority carried out a landscaping project to enhance its woodland aspects by planting more trees and adding formal footpaths to coincide with flood prevention work required in the area (however, local residents noted with concern that a number of older trees of high aesthetic value were felled in the course of this work).

Both King's Park and the former golf course form parts of the 'Magnificent 11' varied-terrain walking route established in 2022 which also includes Linn Park, Cathkin Braes, Castlemilk Park and Fernbrae Meadows.

== Amenities ==
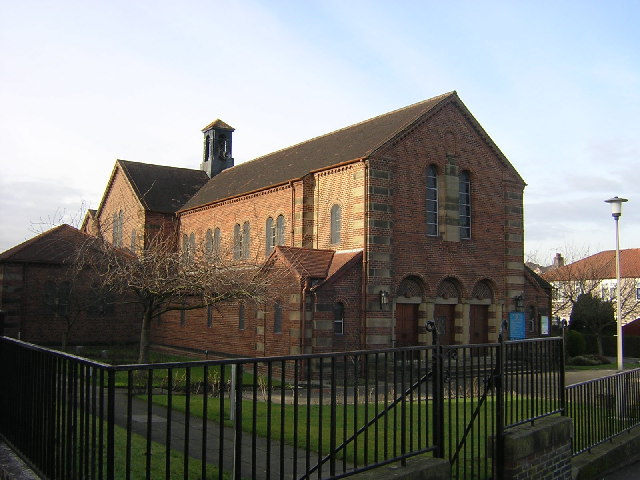
King's Park Parish Church, Castlemilk Road

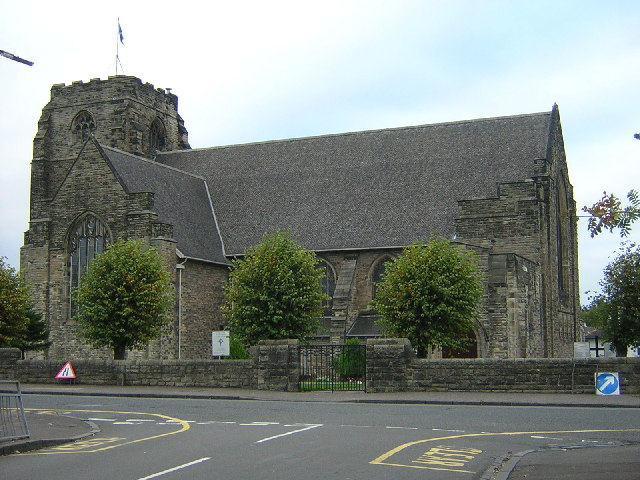
Cathcart Old Parish Church, Carmunnock Road

The local eponymous Church of Scotland parish Church (1930) and St Oswald's Episcopal church (1931) are both found in the east of the district on Castlemilk Road (there is also a Kings Park Baptist Church on Castlemilk Road, but this is the continuation of the same road in Croftfoot, half a mile to the south). Opposite the churches is a row of convenience stores, cafes and a post office, formerly a small public library (on the Rutherglen side of the local authority boundary so operated by South Lanarkshire Council) which closed in 2010, and the site of the State Cinema, later a bingo venue, which was a prominent landmark in the area from the 1930s until its demolition in the early 21st century. Another imposing structure in the area which has survived is the Cathcart Old Parish Church dating from the late 1920s (not to be confused with the ruin of its predecessor a short distance to the west at Manse Brae, including a graveyard dating back centuries) which stands out in its surroundings, a flat area mostly consisting of bungalows.

Owing to the occasional but significant influxes of patrons whose primary destination is Hampden Park, there are two large public houses in its proximity within King's Park's boundaries, The Montford and The Beechwood, both of which adjoin another cluster of shops, with a children's play park and the Kingswood Bowling Club (founded 1929) also next to the Beechwood. Another local club, Mount Florida, is a short distance further west, although falling membership and great interest from developers in the site made its future extremely doubtful by 2019. As of 2020 the club has closed, the future plans for the land are unknown as of yet.

=== Education ===
King's Park Secondary School in nearby Simshill, established in 1962, is the local non-denominational comprehensive. The area is also served by Holyrood Secondary School in Crosshill a short distance to the north - a Roman Catholic school serving the whole of south-east Glasgow, it is one of the largest secondary education institutes in Europe.

Primary schools in the area include King's Park (near the railway station, on the site of Meikle Aikenhead farm), St Fillan's (close to Cathcart Old Church) and St Mirins (Simshill, adjacent to its affiliated Catholic church and its function hall, Christ The King).

Also located in King's Park, 32F Squadron are the first Scottish Squadron of the Air Training Corps who share some facilities with the Territorial Army base on the same site.

=== Transport ===
The area is served by King's Park railway station on the Cathcart Circle Lines (its Newton branch, two trains per hour), although parts are closer to Croftfoot on the same line Mount Florida which is also on a second branch towards Neilston and the south side circle itself so has five trains an hour. Several local buses pass along Aikenhead Road towards Glasgow city centre, with eastern parts served less frequently via Curtis Avenue. It is a ten- to twenty-minute bus or rail journey from Glasgow city centre.
