= Cathcart Trinity Church =

- Cathcart Trinity Parish Church
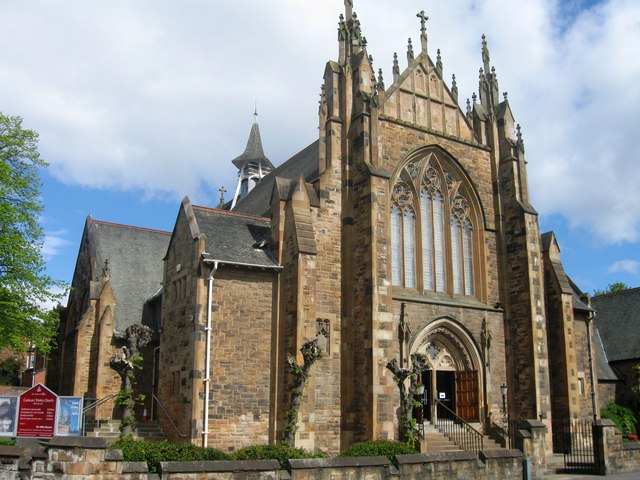
- Cathcart Trinity Church
- 55°48′55″N 4°15′56″W
- Location: Glasgow
- Country: Scotland
- Denomination: Church of Scotland
- Previous denomination: United Presbyterian Church, United Free Church of Scotland
- Churchmanship: Evangelical
- Website: Church Website

History
- Status: Active
- Founder: United Presbyterian Church

Architecture
- Functional status: Parish church
- Architect: William Gardner Rowan
- Architectural type: Church
- Style: Neo-Gothic
- Years built: 1893-1894
- Groundbreaking: 8 April 1893
- Completed: 3 May 1894

Administration
- Parish: Cathcart

Listed Building – Category B
- Designated: 15 December 1970
- Reference no.: LB33919

Cathcart Trinity Church is one of two Church of Scotland parish churches in the Cathcart area of Glasgow.

== History of the building ==
The church was designed by William Gardner Rowan in a richly decorated Neo-Gothic style. The foundation stone was laid on 8 April 1893, with the building being completed a year later, officially opening on 3 May 1894. The old church hall was the original church, having been built in 1889. Another hall, named the Buchanan Hall, was built in 1912.

== Architecture ==
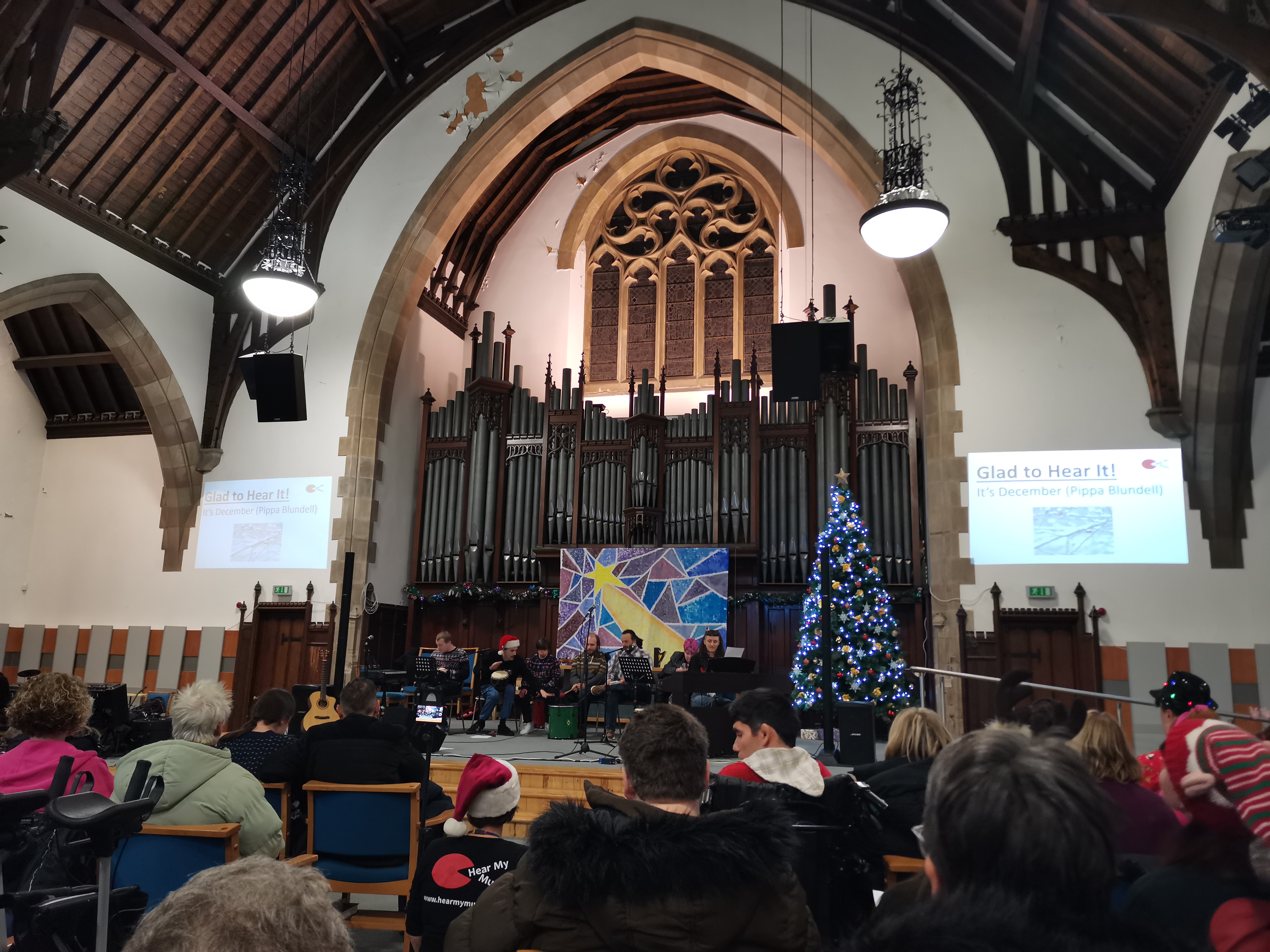
Interior of the church during a festive concert (Hear My Music charity), 2023

The church includes an elaborate pinnacled buttressed front, that includes a central window with Art Nouveau stained glass above the centre door. A ventilator tower was also added to the slated roof.

== History of the congregation ==
The church was founded as the Cathcart United Presbyterian Church. After the United Presbyterian Church united with the Free Church of Scotland in 1900 to form the United Free Church of Scotland, the church was renamed the Cathcart United Free Church. The congregation became part of the Church of Scotland in 1929, after the merger of the denominations. It was then renamed Cathcart South Church. In November 2002, the congregation of Cathcart New Church united with Cathcart South to form the Cathcart Trinity congregation. The old Cathcart South church building was retained as the official parish church building, while the Cathcart New building was sold and converted into flats.

Their mission statement is: Following Jesus Christ. Glorifying God. Serving Others.
