= Fernhill School, Rutherglen =

Fernhill School

Location
- Fernbrae Avenue; Fernhill, Rutherglen, G73 4SG; Scotland; 55.8052°N 4.2008°W

Information
- Type: Private day school
- Motto: Cor unum et anima una (With One Heart And One Mind)
- Religious affiliation: Catholic
- Established: 1972
- Founders: School Sisters of Notre Dame
- Closed: 2026
- Headteacher: Mark Donnelly
- Gender: Co-educational
- Age: 2 to 18
- Enrolment: 250
- Houses: St Andrews, St Joseph and St Julie’s
- Colours: blue, yellow, gray
- Website: http://www.fernhill-school.com

Fernhill School was a private Catholic school in Rutherglen, South Lanarkshire, Scotland. It was co-educational and accepted pupils aged 2 to 18 years old.

== History ==
The school originated in a primary school run by the Sisters of Notre Dame since 1953, which in 1971 was announced for closure. A committee of parents was formed to keep the school open, and in August 1972 the current school opened. There were at the time four members of staff, with the committee serving as the Board of Governors, and the headmistress was Sister Gabriel, of the Sisters of St. Joseph of Cluny. At this time, the school was still only a primary school, and in 1973 it was decided to open a secondary department.

The school stands in some 3.5 hectares (9 acres) of wooded grounds above the city of Glasgow, backing on to the Cathkin Braes. The total Nursery roll has been around 20, the Primary roll has been around 120 and the Secondary has been around 110. Plans were announced in 2013 to make the secondary department co-educational. Fees for S3–S6 were around £20,000 per annum, making it the 20th-most expensive school in Scotland.

It was reported in a front-page article in The Herald on 11 June 2014 that the school had called in the administrators after suffering financial difficulties. Later that day, the school released a statement to say that funds had been secured from parents and governors to allow the school to remain open while refinancing was undertaken.

In January 2026, it was revealed that Fernhill School was to close.After the board was accused of financial fraud but way befrore this the school had been running low on funds it was so bad that they couldnt heat the building and they had black mould, rat and bug infestations. the bug infestation got so bad that they ate through the roof of the girls bathroom and the celing collapsed in on itself

== Notable pupils ==
- Mhairi McKay (born 1975), golfer
