= Cathcart Old Church =

- Cathcart Old Parish Church
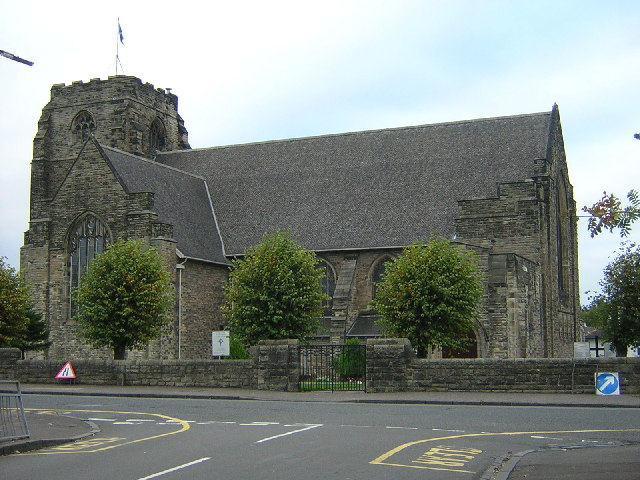
- Cathcart Old Church
- 55°49′05″N 4°15′13″W
- Location: Glasgow
- Country: Scotland
- Denomination: Church of Scotland

History
- Status: Active
- Founded: 9th century

Architecture
- Functional status: Parish church
- Architect: Henry Edward Clifford
- Architectural type: Church
- Style: Neo-Gothic
- Years built: 1914–1929
- Completed: 1929

Administration
- Parish: Cathcart

Listed Building – Category B
- Designated: 15 December 1970
- Reference no.: LB33707

Cathcart Old Church is a Parish church of the Church of Scotland, located between the Cathcart and King's Park areas of Glasgow.

== Previous Churches ==
The first church in Cathcart was built in the 9th century. In 1707, a church was built to replace the medieval church, which was then rebuilt in 1744. In 1831, a new church in the Neo-Gothic style was designed by James Dempster, and replaced the 18th century church, which had fallen into disrepair. The church stood until 1931, when its body was demolished. Its bell tower still stands.

== Present Church ==
The present Cathcart Old Church was built in a medieval Gothic style on designs by Henry Edward Clifford, but which was completed under Watson, Salmond & Gray. Construction commenced in 1914, but was halted due to WWI. In 1923 the building continued until it was completed by 1929. Big buttresses, a square tower, and a simplified hammerbeam roof were built. In 1962, the north transept was converted into the McKellar Memorial Chapel. The church includes a tapestry of The Last Supper by Charles Marshall, and stained glass windows by James Crombie (for Abbey Studios Edinburgh), Douglas Hamilton, and AS Wright of Glasgow.
