= Croftfoot =

Area of Glasgow, Scotland

Coordinates: 55.8138°N 4.2341°W

Croftfoot: Scottish Gaelic: Bun na Croite; Scots: Croaftfuit
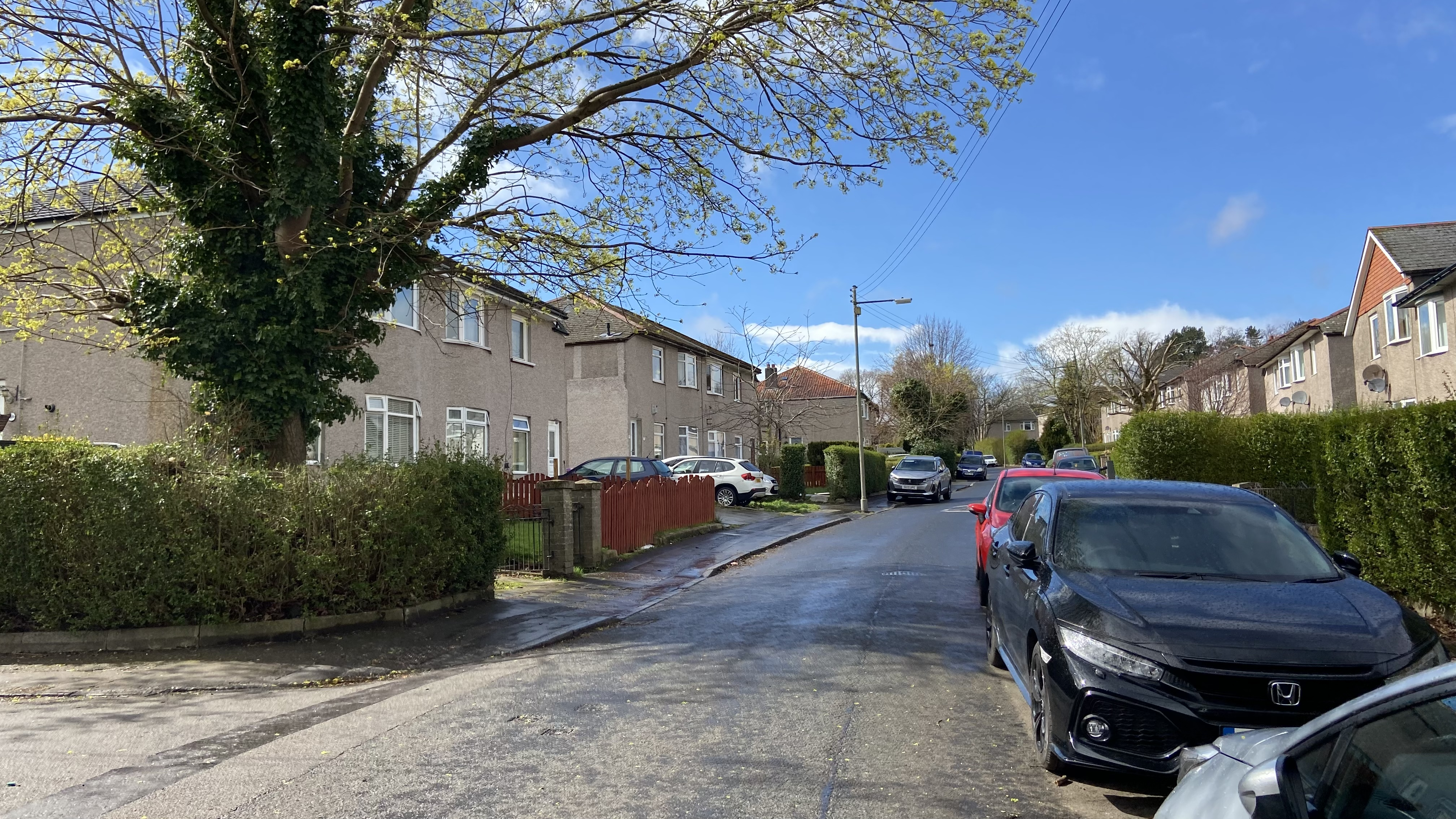
- Midcroft Avenue in Croftfoot

- Location within Glasgow
- Population: 5,800
- OS grid reference: NS601601
- Council area: Glasgow City Council
- Lieutenancy area: Glasgow
- Country: Scotland
- Sovereign state: United Kingdom
- Post town: GLASGOW
- Postcode district: G44 5
- Dialling code: 0141
- Police: Scotland
- Fire: Scottish
- Ambulance: Scottish
- UK Parliament: Glasgow South
- Scottish Parliament: Glasgow Cathcart

Croftfoot (Scots: Croaftfuit, Scottish Gaelic: Bun na Croite) is a residential area on the southeastern side of the Scottish city of Glasgow. It is bordered by Castlemilk to the south and King's Park (both the public park and the residential neighbourhood) to the west within Glasgow, and by the Rutherglen areas of Spittal to the east and Bankhead to the north (across the Cathcart Circle Lines railway). Historically within the civil parish of Cathcart in Renfrewshire, it is within the Linn ward of Glasgow City Council.

== History ==
Named after an old steading which was situated at the eastern end of the present day Croftfoot Road, where the Castlemilk Burn now enters a culvert downstream from the site of Castlemilk House, Croftfoot's housing stock almost entirely comprises grey-roughcast cottage flats, constructed in the 1930s by MacTaggart & Mickel and rented out by the Western Heritable Investment Company. The homes went up for sale from the mid-1950s and many have since been upgraded internally and externally. In 2007, hundreds of householders in the area received substantial council tax refunds after it was found that their homes had been incorrectly placed in too high a 'band' for the size and standard of property since the system was introduced 14 years earlier. Among the few exceptions to the predominant housing style are a pair of sandstone workers' cottages located at the southern edge of the King's Park on Croftpark Avenue, dating from the mid-19th century when it was a rural estate.

== Amenities ==
There is a large Church of Scotland church in the centre of the neighbourhood; built in 1936 and with historic links to congregations in the inner city Gorbals district, it is directly across the road from the local eponymous primary school, a feeder for Kings Park Secondary School. The closest Roman Catholic churches and schools are in the north of Castlemilk (St Bartholomew's) and in Simshill (St Mirins Primary / Christ The King Church). The boundary with Simshill at Carmunnock Road also includes a cluster of shops, a United Free church and Croftfoot Bowling Club (founded in 1954). There is one further church, of the Baptist denomination, on Castlemilk Road near Spittal, sited next to a petrol station and another group of shops, as well as The Croft, the only public house (and restaurant) in the area.

In 2016, the area's recreation fields south of the railway tracks – which had been bequeathed to the community 'in perpituity' in the 1930s but had been allowed to become overgrown over a number of years – were subject to planning applications for new housing. However, vehicular access to the Croftfield Park development, completed in 2019, is via Spittal, and the homes fall under Rutherglen's administration.

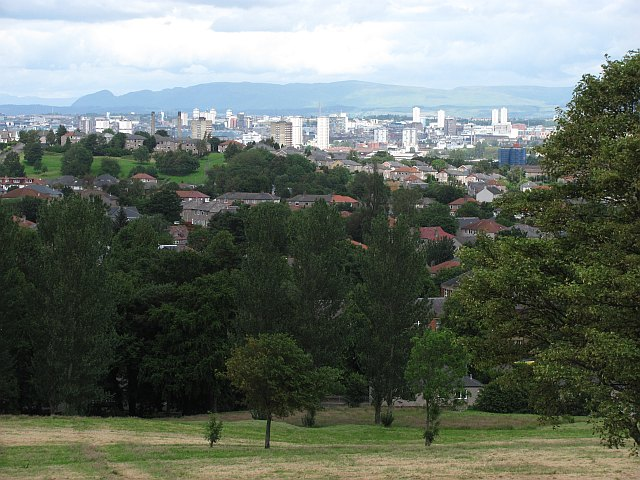
View looking northwards from the high point of the former King's Park Golf Course

Other than King's Park itself, the other green space locally is the former 9-hole golf course (a sector of the public park but actually located separately in Croftfoot) which was notable for being dug into a hillside 20–35° steep in some places. Donated to the city by the Western Heritable Investment Company and established in 1934, it became derelict and was used as an area of common ground for dog walkers etc. In 2020, the local authority carried out a landscaping project to enhance its woodland aspects by planting more trees and adding formal footpaths to coincide with flood prevention work required in the area (however, local residents noted with concern that a number of older trees of high aesthetic value were felled in the course of this work).

== Transport ==
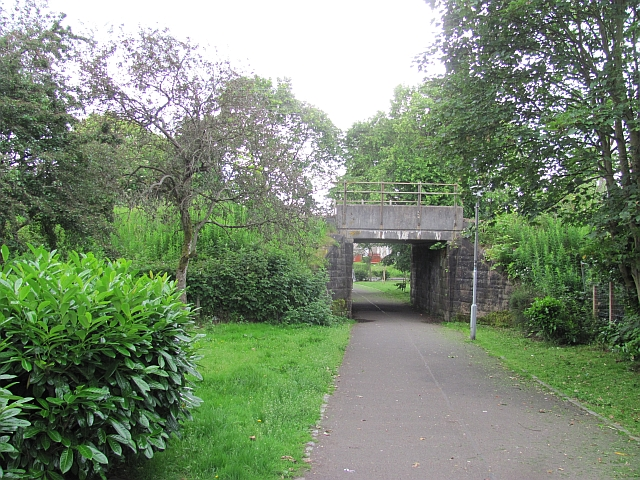
Pedestrian underpass under railway between the two parts of Castlemilk Road

The area is served by Croftfoot railway station with two trains per hour, and by the 5 (via Carmunnock Road, Croftfoot Road) and 75 (via Menock Road, Castlemilk Road) First Glasgow bus routes from the city centre. These wide primary routes were designed to accommodate the city tram network of the era, but the side streets are generally narrow, and with multiple cars in 21st century households and limited off-road driveways, traffic issues are commonplace, exacerbated by commuters parking their vehicles near the station, which has no formal car park.

Croftfoot's location bordering the existing railway but with the only direct access across the tracks being footpaths (Castlemilk Road is a continuation of the road of the same name running through Bankhead / King's Park with an almost identical appearance of housing style, but does not connect other than by a pedestrian underpass) means all vehicles approaching from the north must either travel around Spittal - a detour of 1.6 miles (2.6 km) from Bankhead Road at Croftfoot station – or via Menock Road – a detour of 1 mile (1.6 km) from Castlemilk Road at King's Park Avenue – to enter the area.
