= Croftfoot railway station =

Railway station in Glasgow, Scotland

Croftfoot Scottish Gaelic: Bun na Croite
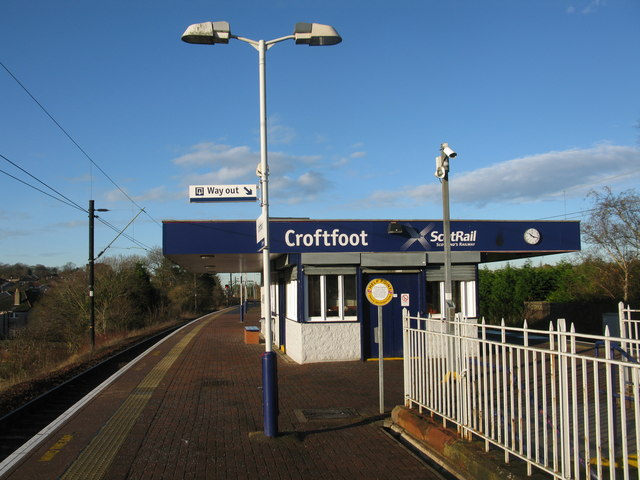
- Croftfoot railway station, looking west

General information
- Location: South Lanarkshire; Scotland
- Coordinates: 55.8182°N 4.2282°W
- Grid reference: NS604605
- Manager: ScotRail
- Platforms: 2

Other information
- Station code: CFF

History
- Original company: London, Midland and Scottish Railway
- Post-grouping: London, Midland and Scottish Railway; Scottish Region

Key dates
- 1 January 1931: Station opened

Passengers
- 2021/22: ▲0.145 million
- 2022/23: ▲0.185 million
- 2023/24: ▲0.226 million
- 2024/25: ▼0.216 million
- 2025/26: ▲0.219 million
Location
- Location within Glasgow council area
Notes
- Passenger statistics from the Office of Rail and Road

Croftfoot railway station is a railway station in South Lanarkshire, Scotland, which lies close to the Glasgow City council area / South Lanarkshire boundary serving the Croftfoot area of the City of Glasgow and the Spittal and Bankhead areas of the town of Rutherglen. The station is managed by ScotRail and is on the Newton branch of the Cathcart Circle Line.

== Services ==
Every day of the week, there is:

- 2tph to Newton
- 1tph to Glasgow Central via Mount Florida
- 1tph to Glasgow Central via Maxwell Park

Preceding station	National Rail	Following station
Burnside	ScotRail; Cathcart Circle Lines	King's Park
