= Fernbrae Meadows =

Public green space in South Lanarkshire, Scotland

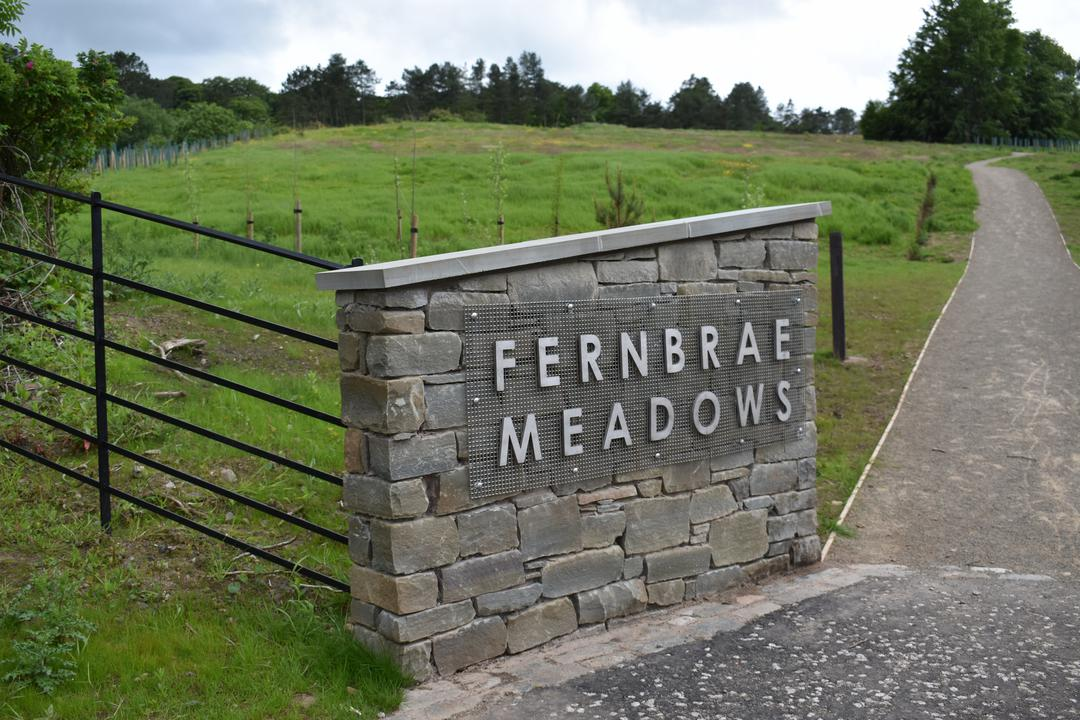
Sign at Burnside Road (eastern) entrance of Fernbrae Meadows

Fernbrae Meadows is a public greenspace in South Lanarkshire, Scotland, located on high ground to the south of Rutherglen, specifically directly south of the Fernhill neighbourhood. It is a local nature reserve.

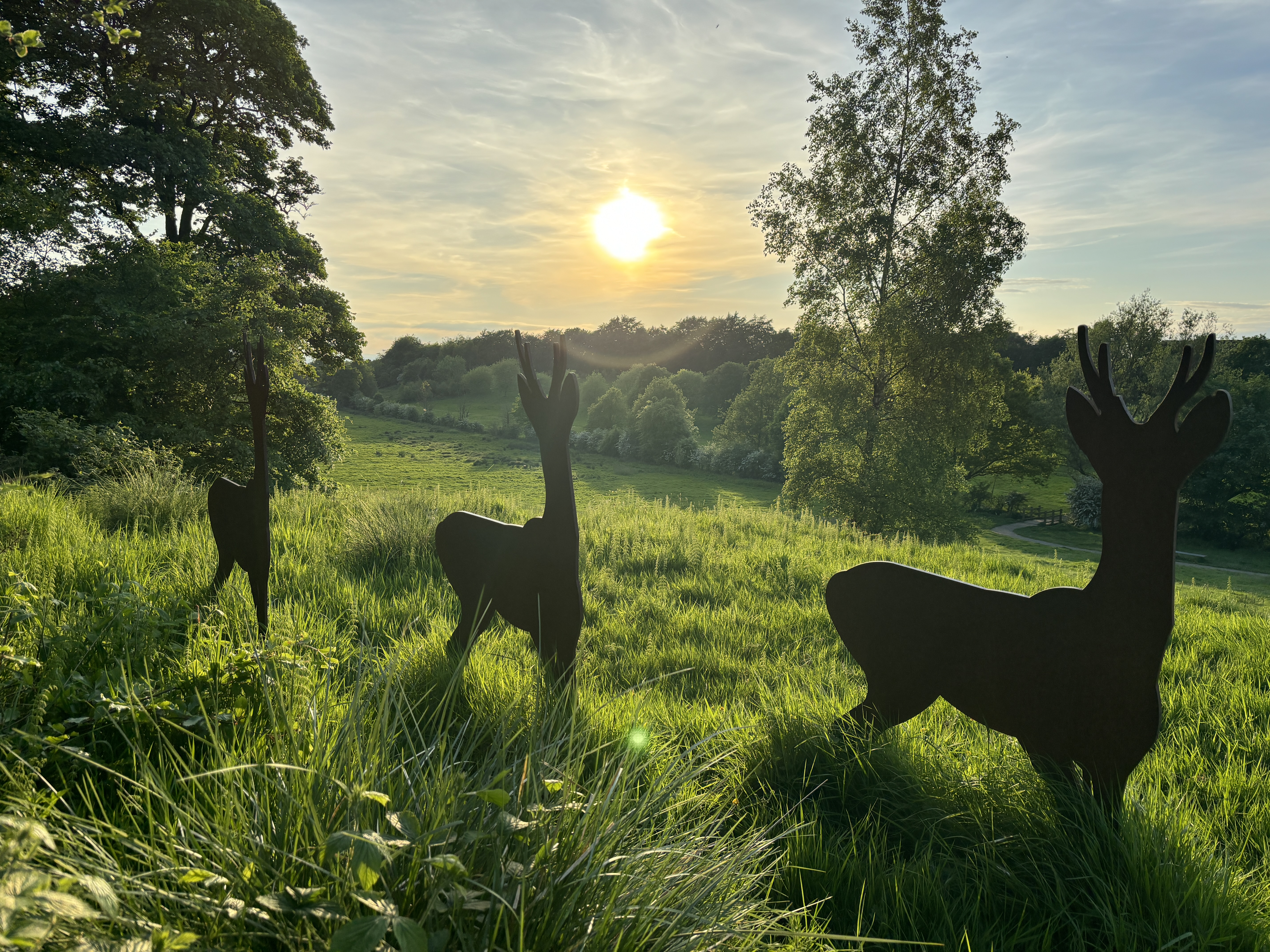
Three metal deer sculptures stand in a grassy area. The sun is setting. Three stone sculptures on a grassy hill

== History ==
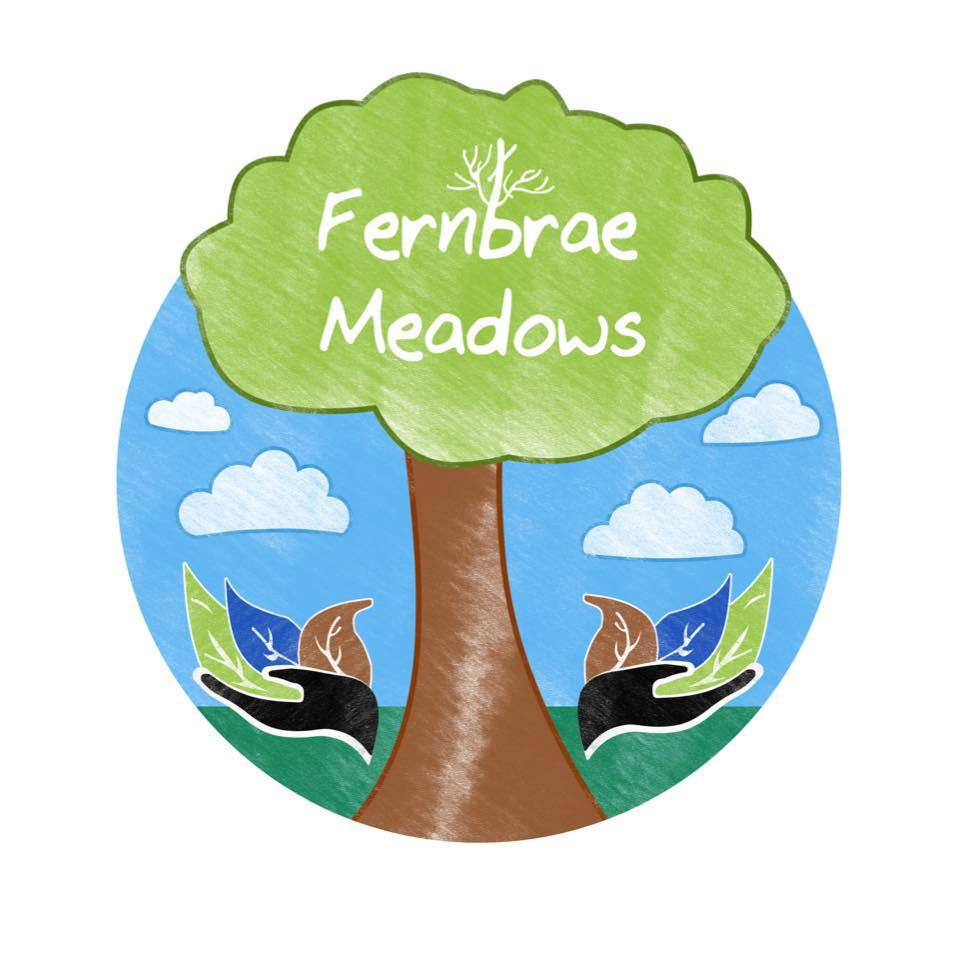
Logo of Fernbrae Meadows

The park was created between 2015 and 2019, following the closure of Blairbeth Golf Course, which had operated there since 1956. It was named Fernbrae Meadows following consultation with the local community. The park lies adjacent to Cathkin Braes Country Park.

In 1854, journalist Hugh MacDonald published Rambles Round Glasgow in which he describes a visit to the area thus:

From Stonelaw to Cathkin the road gradually ascends through a delightful succession of gently swelling knolls and fields in a high state of cultivation, interspersed with clumps of wood and fine belts of planting, the haunts of numerous birds, and at this season of love ringing merrily with their sweetest melodies.

It forms part of the 'Magnificent 11' varied-terrain walking route established in 2022 which also includes Linn Park, King's Park, Castlemilk Park and Cathkin Braes.

Archaeologists and antiquarians have drawn attention to the existence of prehistoric burial mounds and cairns in the surrounding area.

== Biodiversity ==
The recent development of Fernbrae Meadows has created a number of habitats, including wildflower meadow, woodland, wetlands and marshy grassland.

The grasslands contain holcus lanatus, rough meadow-grass, meadow foxtail, bush vetch, common hogweed, sweet vernal-grass, meadow vetchling, broad-leaved dock, field forget me not, common sorrel and bracken.

Wet areas contain meadowsweet, soft-rush, marsh Thistle, sharp-flowered Rush, common yellow sedge, oval sedge, marsh-bedstraw and marsh marigold.
