= Local nature reserve =

Designation for nature reserves in Great Britain

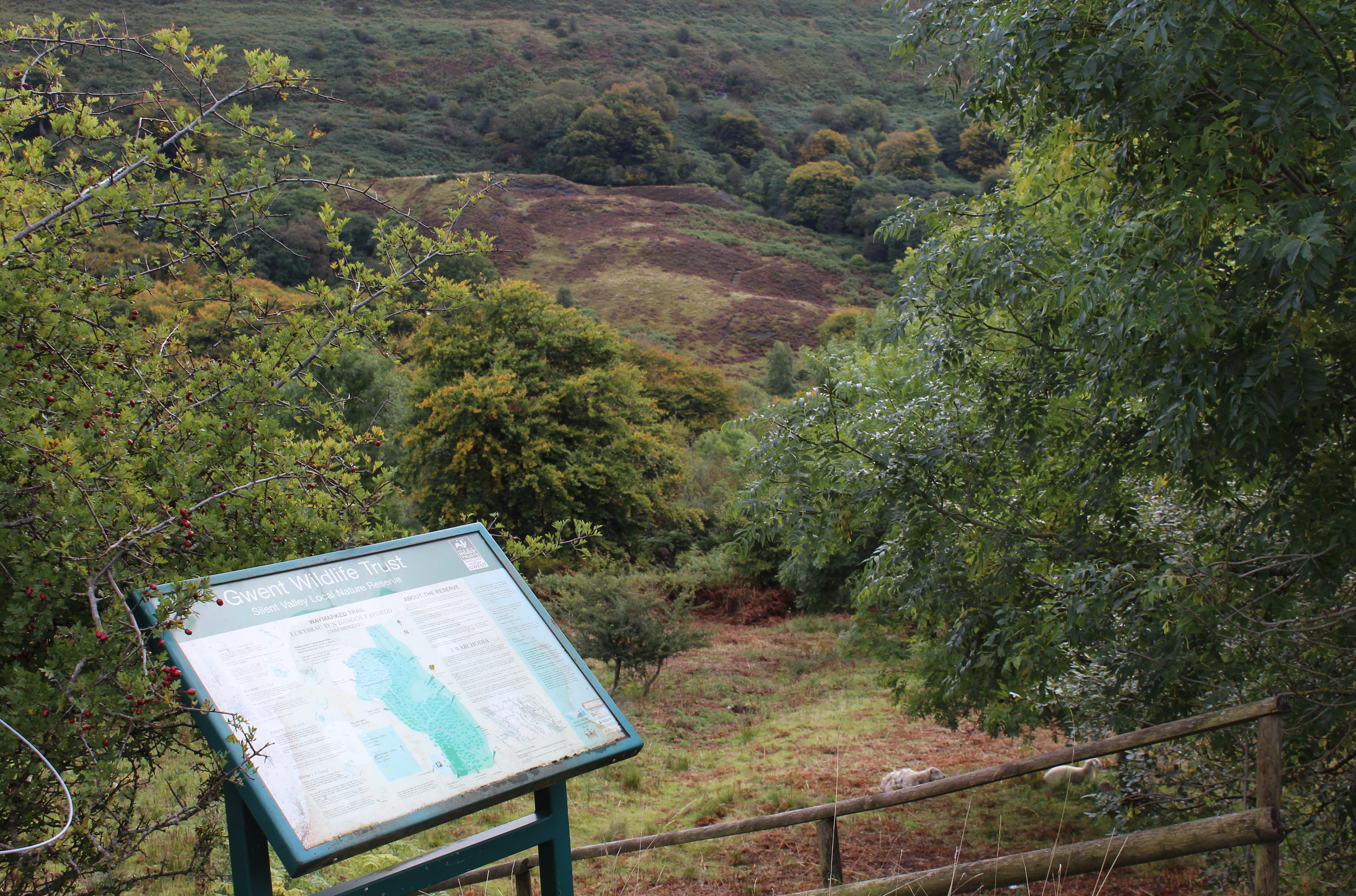
Silent Valley Local Nature Reserve, Cwm, Blaenau Gwent, Wales

Local nature reserve (LNR) is a statutory designation for certain nature reserves in Great Britain. The Wild Life Conservation Special Committee established them and proposed a national suite of protected areas comprising national nature reserves, conservation areas (which incorporated suggestions for Sites of Special Scientific Interest), national parks, geological monuments, local nature reserves and local educational nature reserves.

There are now over 1,280 LNRs in England, covering almost 40,000 hectares, which range from windswept coastal headlands and ancient woodlands to former inner city railways and long abandoned landfill sites.

== History ==
=== National Parks and Access to the Countryside Act ===
The National Parks and Access to the Countryside Act 1949 combined elements of several of these categories in its definition of a nature reserve (Section 15). The hope of the Special Committee was to see sites protected which represented sites of local scientific interest, which could be used by schools for field teaching and experiment, and in which people with no special interest in natural history could "...derive great pleasure from the peaceful contemplation of nature."

A local nature reserve is a statutory designation made under section 21 – "Establishment of nature reserves by local authorities" – of the National Parks and Access to the Countryside Act 1949 by principal local authorities (district, borough or unitary councils) in England, Scotland and Wales. Parish and town councils in England have no direct power to designate nature reserves, but they can have the powers to do so delegated to them by their principal local authority using section 101 of the Local Government Act 1972.

The first LNR in Scotland was established in 1952 at Aberlady in East Lothian.

== Establishment of nature reserves ==
To establish a LNR, the declaring local authority must first have a legal interest in the land concerned, for example, they could own it, lease it or have a nature reserve agreement with the owner. The land must lie within the area which the declaring authority controls.

LNRs are of local, but not necessarily national, importance. LNRs are almost always owned by local authorities, who often pass the management of the LNR onto County Wildlife Trusts. LNRs also often have good public access and facilities. A LNR can also be an SSSI (Site of Special Scientific Interest), but often is not, or may have other designations (although an LNR cannot also be a national nature reserve). Except where the site is an SSSI, there is no legal necessity to manage a LNR to any set standard, but management agreements often exist.

A LNR may be given protection against damaging operations. It also has certain protection against development on and around it. This protection is usually given via the local plan (produced by the planning authority), and often supplemented by local by-laws. However, there is no national legal protection specifically for LNRs.

=== Information ===
Information on LNRs is available from the Countryside Council for Wales (A Place for Nature at your Doorstep: the role of Local Nature Reserves, 2004), Natural England (Local Nature Reserves: places for people and wildlife, 2000) and Scottish Natural Heritage (Local Nature Reserves in Scotland: a guide to their selection and declaration, 2000).

== See also ==
- List of local nature reserves in England
- List of local nature reserves in Scotland
- List of local nature reserves in Wales
- Site of nature conservation interest
- Nature reserves in Northern Ireland
- National nature reserve (United Kingdom)
