= Linn Park, Glasgow =

200 acre park in Glasgow, Scotland

Linn Park
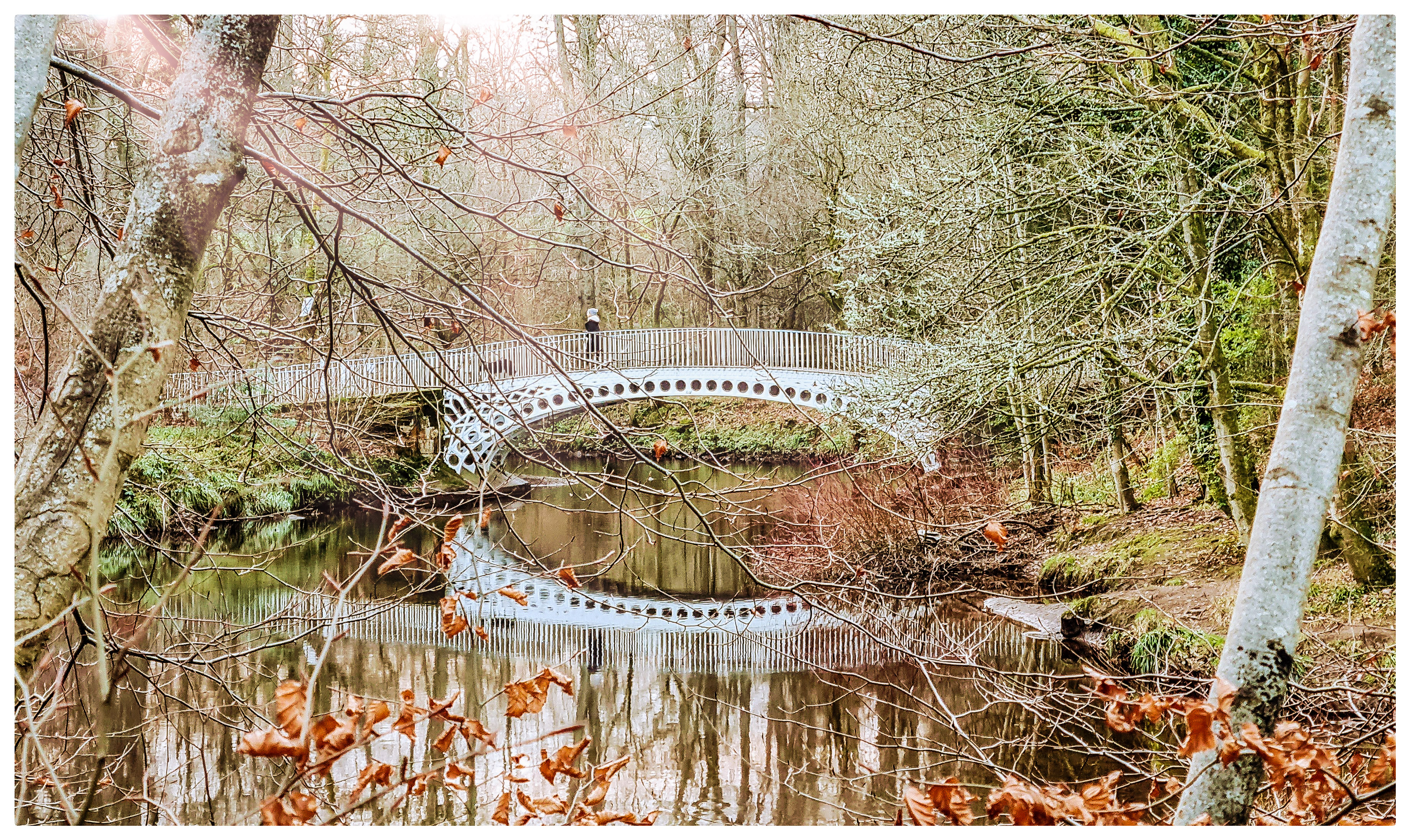
- The "Halfpenny Bridge" over the White Cart Water
- Interactive map of Linn Park
- Type: Public park
- Location: Glasgow, Scotland
- OS grid: NS5847059131
- Coordinates: 55°48′17″N 4°15′30″W
- Area: 82 hectares (200 acres)
- Opened: 1919
- Operator: Glasgow City Council

Linn Park is an 82-hectare (200-acre) park in Glasgow, Scotland, surrounded by the suburbs of Cathcart, Muirend, Simshill, and Castlemilk, also bordering Netherlee in East Renfrewshire. It is Glasgow's third largest park, after Pollok Country Park and Dams to Darnley Country Park, although Dams to Darnley is partly in East Renfrewshire. Both Linn and Pollok parks have the White Cart Water flowing through them.

== History and features ==
The park was acquired by Glasgow Corporation in 1919 and incorporated within the city boundaries in 1938. It was originally part of the lands of Hagtonhill and several others owned by the Maxwell family, who were extensive local landowners based at Pollok House. The park is managed by Glasgow City Council and there is an active Friends of Linn Park group.

The remains of Cathcart Castle are situated at the northern end of the park. The castle was built by the first Lord Cathcart around 1450 and added to the park in 1927. It was demolished in 1980 after lying derelict for a long period.

The park contains a large mansion, Linn House, which was originally built c. 1811 for Rev. James Hall, who a short time later became bankrupt resulting in the house and estate being put up for auction on behalf of the creditors. James Hall's wife, Mary Maxwell, separately owned adjacent land at Bogton which was the subject of a legal action by the creditors against her, which was determined at the Court of Session in January 1814. The mansion and surrounding estate was sold again in 1820, by which time the familiar cast iron "Ha'penny Bridge" (now a Category B listed structure) was in place.

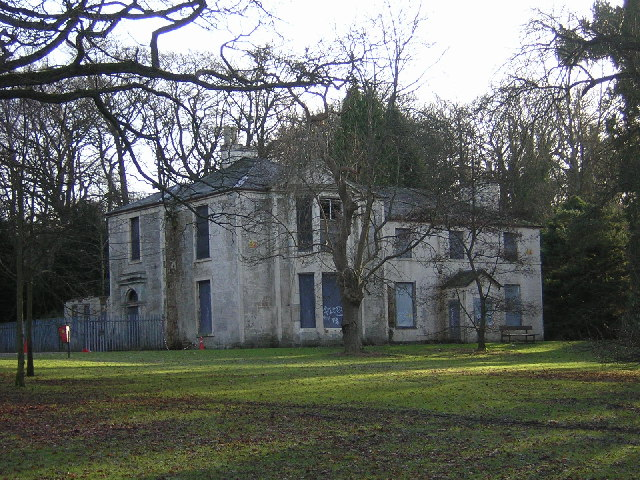
Linn House in 2005, prior to its refurbishment

A new mansion house was then constructed in the 1820s and extended in the 1850s, the architect being Charles Wilson. The name "Linn" refers to the waterfall on the river and old maps show that the title pre-dates the development of the mansion house, which was converted to four private homes in 2007 after lying derelict for some time.

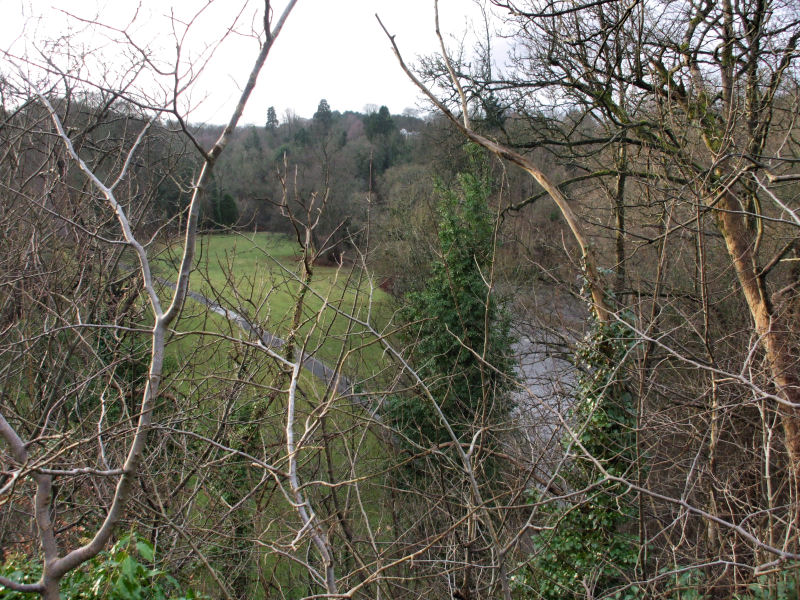
The park from Cathcart Castle

The park offers woodland and river walks. There is also an equestrian centre, an orienteering course, an 18-hole public golf course (bordering the suburb of Castlemilk but accessed from Simshill) - this was once Cathcart Castle Golf Club, this was set out in the 1890s before the Glasgow Corporation purchased the land and the club moved out to their current site near Clarkston in East Renfrewshire in 1924. There are also a couple of children's play areas, one of which is on the opposite bank of the White Cart from the majority of the park's land, directly adjacent to Cathcart Cemetery. A small area of the park has been made inaccessible by a fence cordoning off an area containing a potentially dangerous landslip.

On the southern edge of the park are Linn Crematorium and Linn Cemetery (accessed from Castlemilk, where there is also a small industrial estate named after the park).

In late 2021, Glasgow City Council closed one of the main entrances and paths into the park due to falling rocks. The path, at Snuff Mill Bridge, is the main entrance to the park from Cathcart. It remained closed in July 2026, with specialist repairs scheduled to start "within 10 weeks" according to a spokesperson for the local authority.

It forms part of the 'Magnificent 11' varied-terrain walking route established in 2022 which also includes Cathkin Braes, King's Park, Castlemilk Park and Fernbrae Meadows.
