= Cathcart =

Coordinates: 55.8195°N 4.2679°W

Cathcart: Scottish Gaelic: Coille Chart; Scots: Kithcart
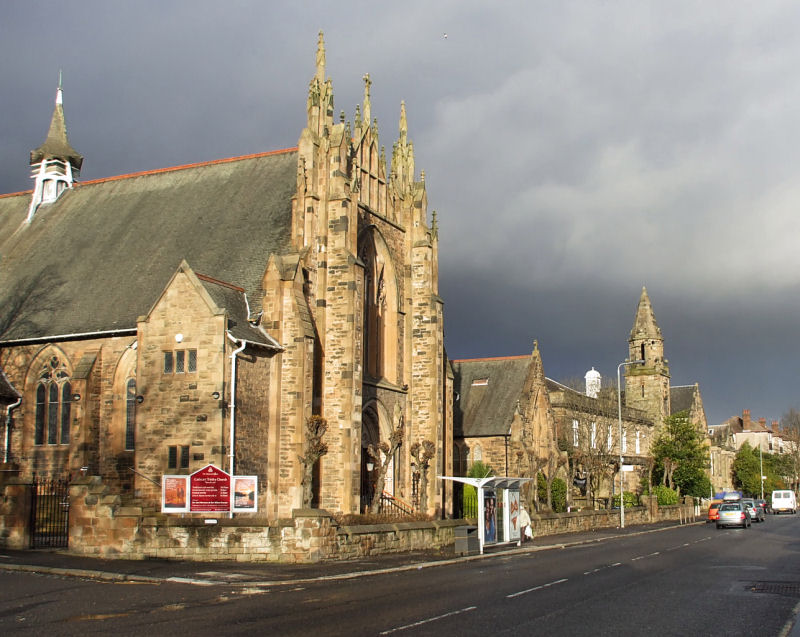
- Cathcart Trinity Church on Clarkston Road, with the Couper Institute in the distance

- Location within the Glasgow City council area Location within Scotland
- OS grid reference: NS580608
- Council area: Glasgow City
- Lieutenancy area: Glasgow
- Country: Scotland
- Sovereign state: United Kingdom
- Post town: GLASGOW
- Postcode district: G44
- Dialling code: 0141
- Police: Scotland
- Fire: Scottish
- Ambulance: Scottish
- UK Parliament: Glasgow South
- Scottish Parliament: Glasgow Cathcart

Cathcart (/ˌkæθˈkɑːrt/; Scots: Kithcart, Scottish Gaelic: Coille Chart) is an area of Glasgow between Battlefield, Mount Florida, King's Park, Muirend and Newlands. The White Cart Water flows through Cathcart, downstream from Linn Park. In 2014, it was rated one of the most attractive postcode areas to live in Scotland.

== Etymology ==
The name Cathcart derives from the River Cart. The first part of the name varies in different early sources. The earliest attestation appears in 1158, as Kerkert; here the first element is the Common Brittonic or Pictish word surviving today in modern Welsh as caer ("fortification"). Thereafter, however, most or all attestations begin with the word that survives in modern Welsh as coed ("woodland"). These include Katkert (c. 1170), Catkert (between 1177 and 1185), and an attestation in the epithet of one Gilbert of Kathkerd from between 1203 and 1210. Thus, in its different forms, the name once meant "fortress on the River Cart" and "woodland on the River Cart".

== History ==
The ancient parish was formed around Cathcart Castle, the hereditary seat of the Cathcart family. The castle was built in the 15th-century on a site overlooking the White Cart Water, now part of Linn Park. The remains of the castle were demolished in 1980, having been declared unsafe, leaving only the foundations.

Originally part of the Parish of Govan in Renfrewshire, most of the ancient parish was annexed by the county of city of Glasgow in 1912. Cathcart is mainly a residential area, containing a mix of tenements, terraces and villas built from red or blonde sandstone. There are some historic buildings, including the Couper Institute (a public hall and library) and the Snuff Mill. One of Alexander Thomson's most significant buildings, Holmwood House, is situated in Cathcart, close to the Glasgow city boundary.

Local industry includes ClydeUnion Pumps (previously part of Weir Group), and Scottish Power.

Cathcart is served by Cathcart railway station on the Cathcart Circle Line, as well as numerous bus routes.

Linn Park, the second largest park in the city, is within the surrounding area. The semi natural woodland, declared a local nature reserve in 2012, has a large path network and river walk.

== Churches ==
Cathcart contains several churches including Cathcart Baptist church, Cathcart United Free church, Cathcart Congregational church and two Church of Scotland churches; Cathcart Old and Cathcart Trinity. The present Cathcart Old building was opened in 1929 and sits across Carmunnock Road from the earlier churchyard which contains the tower from the previous church and a graveyard. Cathcart Trinity was formed in November 2002 from the union of the vacant charges of Cathcart South and New Cathcart. The former New Cathcart Church building was converted into housing in 2006. Cathcart's Catholic residents are served by St Gabriel's Church in Merrylee and by Christ the King in King's Park. Three congregations of Jehovah's Witnesses share a Kingdom Hall in Cathcart.
