= Cathkin Braes =

Hills to the south east of Glasgow, Scotland

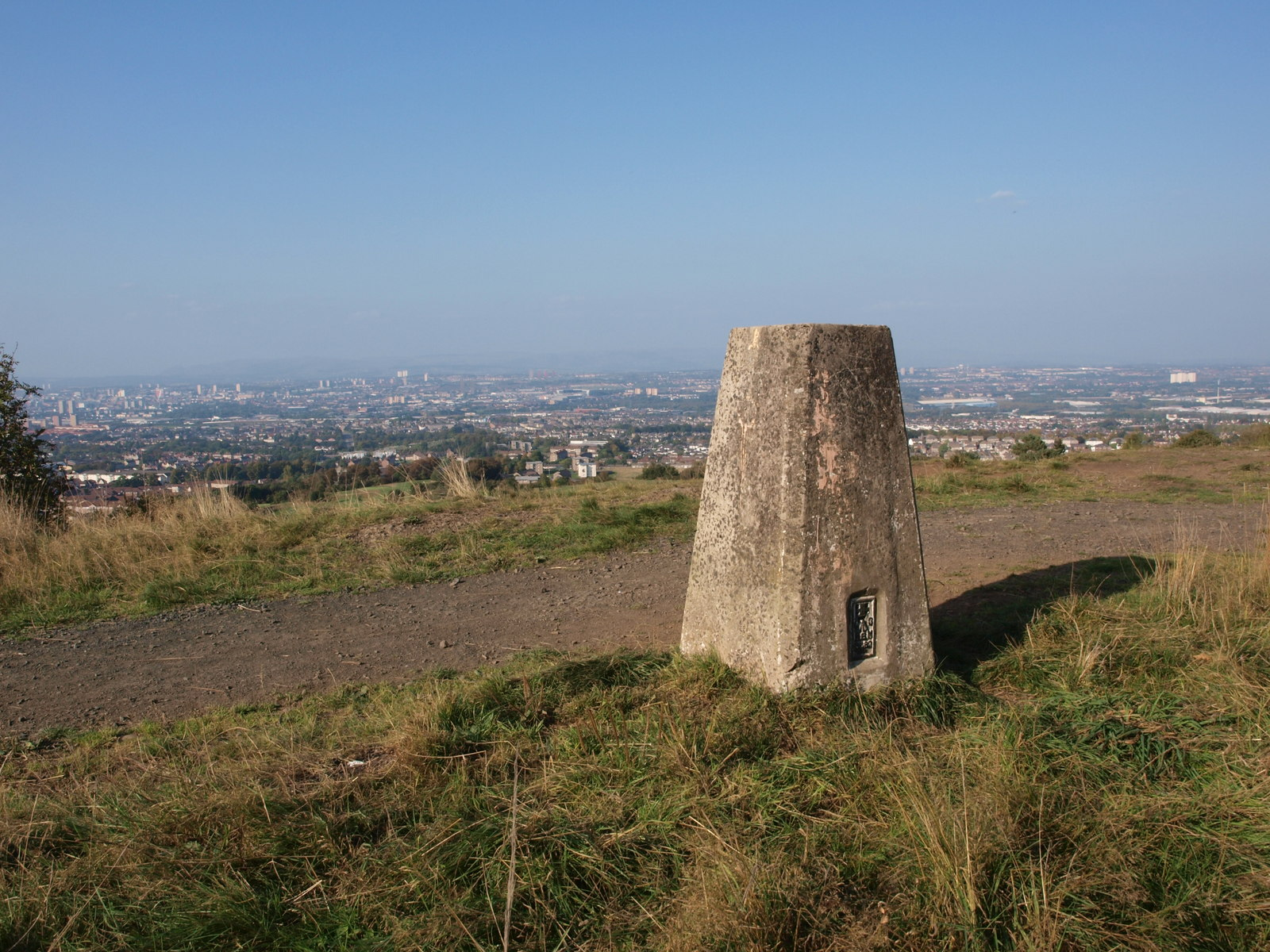
- Trig point at Queen Mary's Seat

Highest point
- Peak: Queen Mary's Seat
- Elevation: 200 m (660 ft)
- Parent peak: Corse Hill
- Coordinates: 55.800365°N 4.205108°W

Dimensions
- Length: 5.5 km (3.4 mi)

Geography
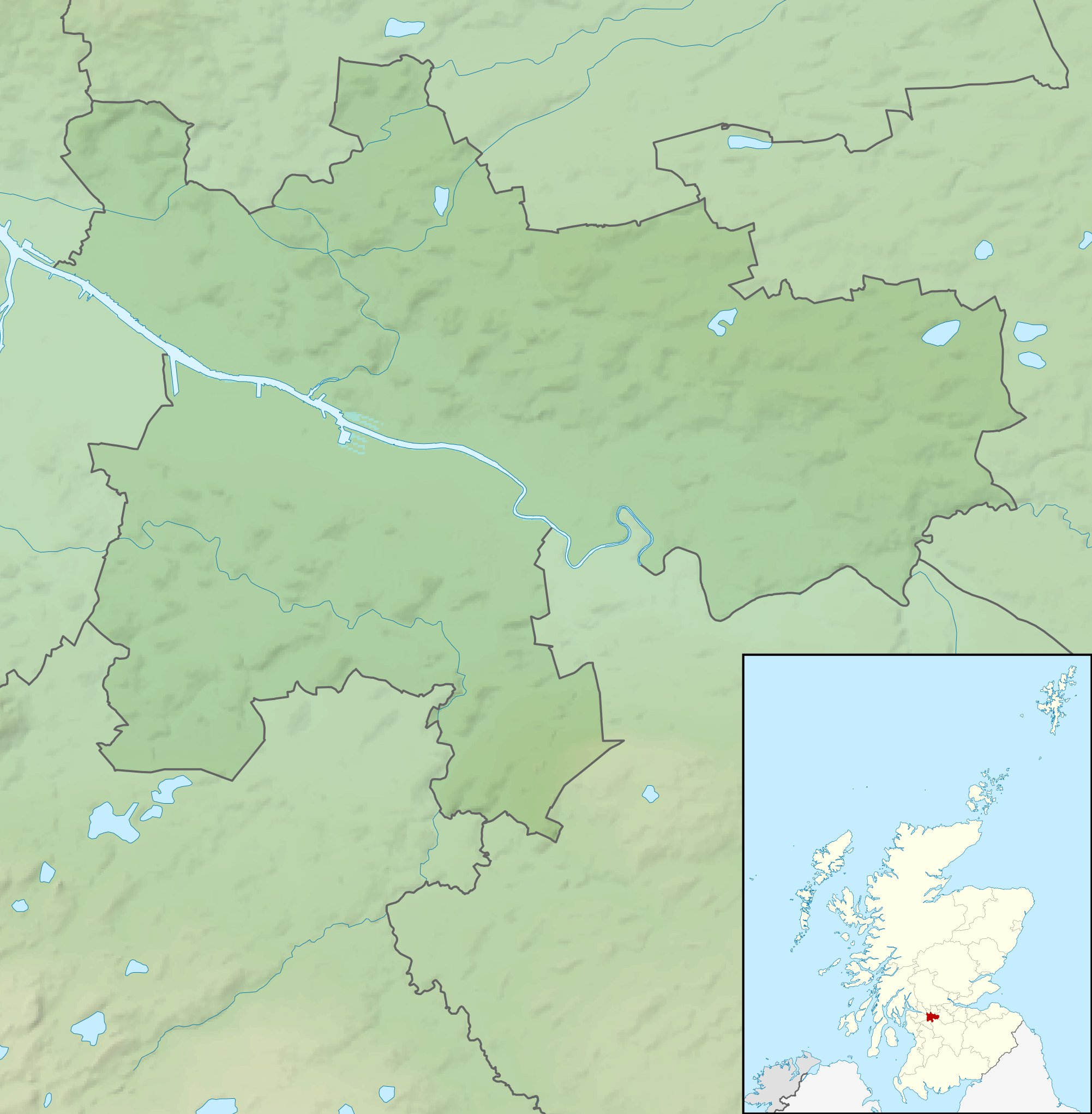
- Location within Glasgow council area
- Country: Scotland
- City: Glasgow

Climbing
- Access: Castlemilk, East Kilbride

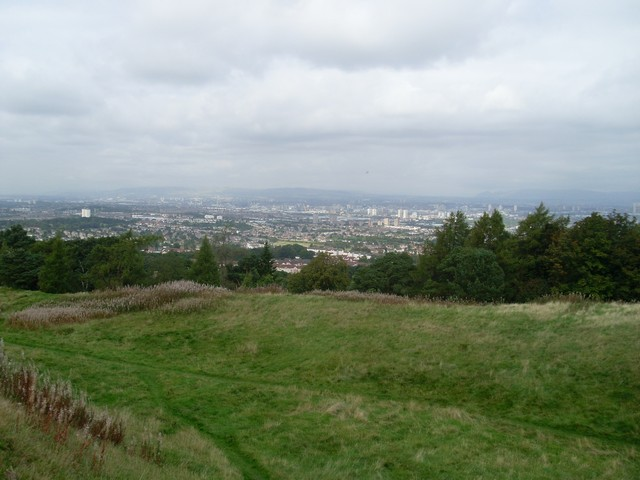
Looking north over Glasgow

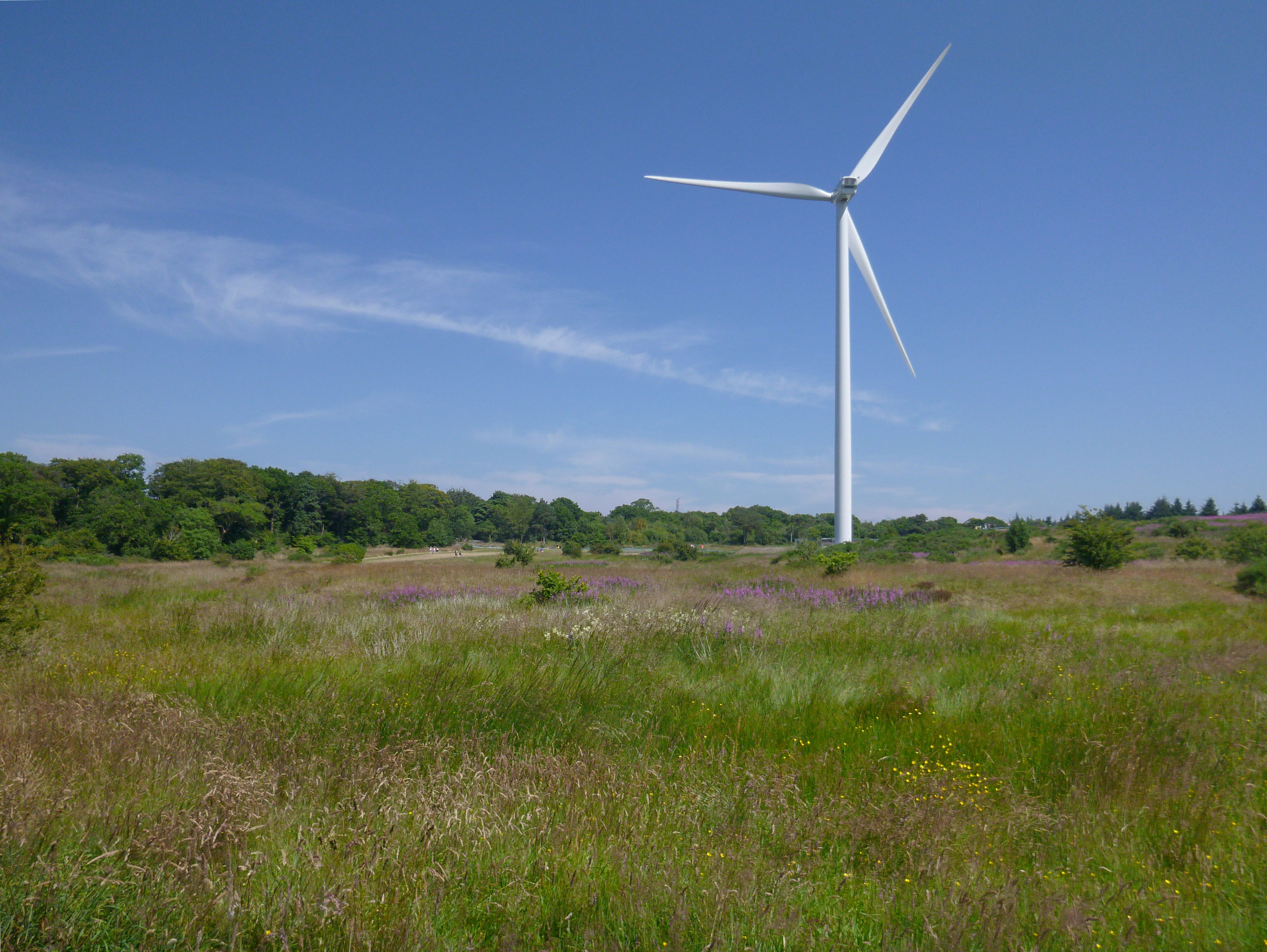
Wind turbine, installed 2013

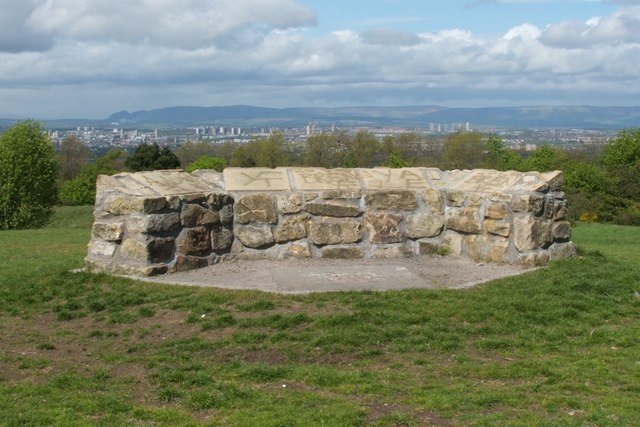
Stone viewpoint within the park

The Cathkin Braes are a range of hills to the south east of the city of Glasgow, in Scotland. It lies to the south of Castlemilk and Rutherglen (the Cathkin, Fernhill and High Burnside neighbourhoods), to the east of Carmunnock, and south-west of Cambuslang.

Rising to over 200 m (660 ft) in elevation, it includes the highest point in the Glasgow City area, with panoramic views of the entire city and the Campsie Fells immediately behind. The summit of Ben Lomond is also visible in the distance on a clear day.

It was a rallying point in the Radical War. It includes The Big Wood and Cathkin Braes Park Woodland, both areas of mature beech, sycamore and oak trees. In addition there is grassland, heath, hedgerows and wetlands. These natural areas provide foraging habitat for a number of species, including kestrels and owls.

A number of mountain bike trails have been constructed in the area. These were used for the 2013 British National Mountain Biking Championships, and was the venue for mountain biking at the 2014 Commonwealth Games. These trails include one orange, two red, and one blue. There is also a skills park and pump track at the bottom of the hill. The skills park includes drop off practise, jump practise and rock roll practise.

Since 2013, a single 3 MW wind turbine – 125 metres (410 ft) in height including the blades – has been in place at the brow of the Braes, just inside the Glasgow City boundary (a trig point and transmitter station a short distance to the east are within South Lanarkshire). Due to its prominent location, the turbine can be seen from across the city. It is unclear if more are planned for the area, with subsidy funding for onshore windfarms cut by the UK Government in 2015, although local bodies were supportive of further projects.

It forms part of the 'Magnificent 11' varied-terrain walking route established in 2022 which also includes Linn Park, King's Park, Castlemilk Park and Fernbrae Meadows.

The vista of the city from its summit was used as the original title card for the police drama Taggart.

== See also ==
- Fereneze Braes
- Gleniffer Braes
- Dams to Darnley Country Park
