= Carmunnock =

Conservation village in Scotland

Coordinates: 55.789508°N 4.237529°W

Carmunnock: Scottish Gaelic: Cair Mhanach or Corr Mhanach
- Location within Glasgow
- Population: 1,350 (2020)
- OS grid reference: NS598574
- Council area: Glasgow
- Lieutenancy area: Glasgow
- Country: Scotland
- Sovereign state: United Kingdom
- Post town: GLASGOW
- Postcode district: G76
- Dialling code: 0141
- Police: Scotland
- Fire: Scottish
- Ambulance: Scottish
- UK Parliament: Glasgow South
- Scottish Parliament: Glasgow Cathcart

Carmunnock (/kɑːrˈmʌnək/; Scottish Gaelic: Cair Mhanach or Corr Mhanach) is a conservation village situated within the Glasgow City council area, lying within three miles (five kilometres) of East Kilbride and Rutherglen in South Lanarkshire and Busby in East Renfrewshire. The nearest other district within Glasgow is Castlemilk.

== History ==
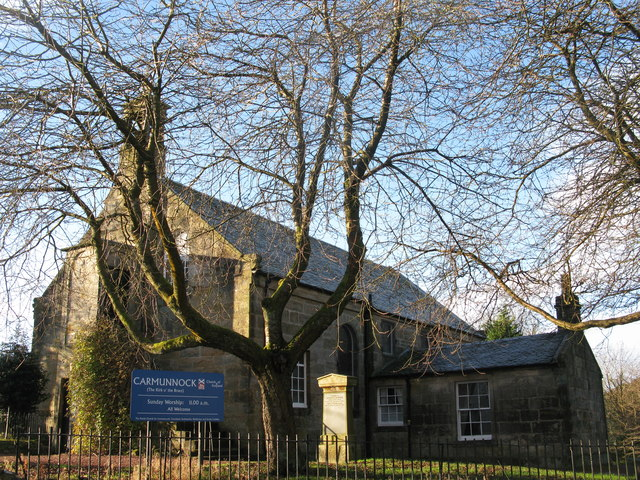
Carmunnock Parish Church

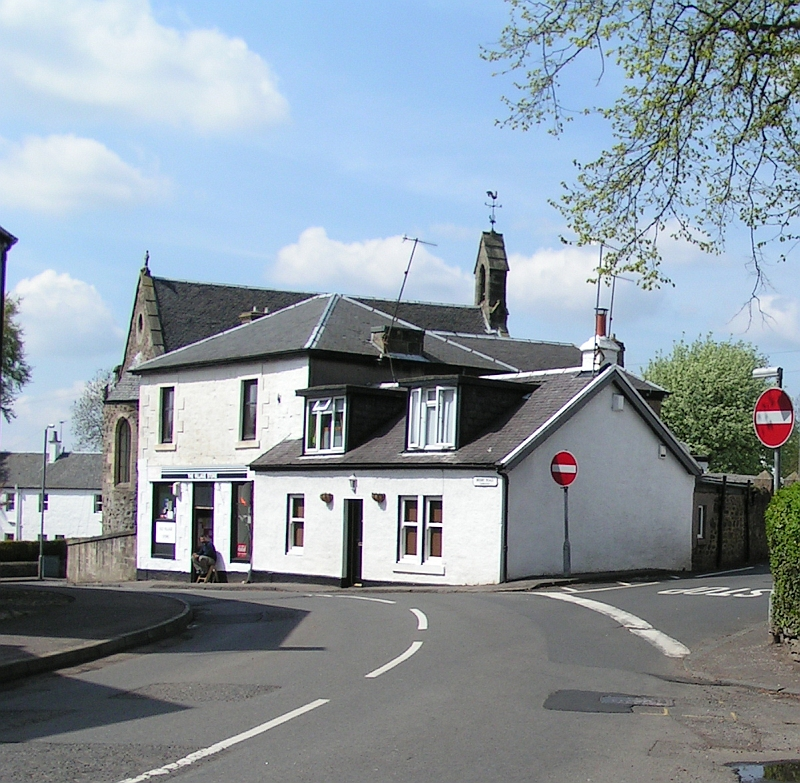
Village store and the Clason hall

This ancient settlement which is associated with the early Christian missionary Saint Cadoc, has a medieval street plan set within the lands of an estate held by variously the Morays of Bothwell, the Earls of Douglas and eventually to the Lords, Marquesses and Dukes of Hamilton until 1700 when it passed to the Stuarts of Castlemilk.

There are many cottages in the village that date back to the 1600s, and it is the last remaining village situated within the Glasgow City council area.

The World's Strongest Man competition started life in a garage in the village.

== Amenities ==
The village is a popular residential area. The village has its own primary school (Carmunnock Primary School). There is also a village shop, a nursery, a bistro and a restaurant.

The village hosts a Gala Day, and its own Highland Games each year, which has had guest appearances from the likes of Hafþór Júlíus Björnsson.

== Religion ==
The only religious body in Carmunnock is the Church of Scotland's Carmunnock Parish Church on Kirk Road, which is also known as 'The Kirk in the Braes'. The original church was built on site of the current Church around 800 years, with the current building being built in 1767 in the Civil Parish of Carmunnock. It is the oldest local parish church within the borders of the council, and being the second oldest church still in active use today - only Glasgow Cathedral being older. The church features external stone staircases to three galleries within the sanctuary and contains examples of stained glass by Norman Macleod MacDougall.

The church is surrounded by the old village graveyard which includes a watch-house with original instructions for grave watchers of 1828, when grave robbing was a problem. Within the structure of the church is a vault where some members of the Stirling-Stewart family, the Lairds of Castlemilk, are buried.

== Transport ==
The village's only public transport links are the number 31 bus service operated by First Glasgow to Glasgow City Centre and the 31B bus service to East Kilbride, operated by JMB Travel. The nearest train station is at Busby, which is on the East Kilbride to Glasgow line.

The main route through the village is the B759 which runs from Busby, East Renfrewshire to Cambuslang.

== Etymology ==
Carmunnock was first recorded as Curmannoc in the late 12th century. It is likely to be of Brythonic origin, but it could also be from Scottish Gaelic. The second element is manach, which means monk in both modern Scottish Gaelic and in old Northern Brythonic and the first element is either càrr/*cor meaning 'rocky shelf' or cair/caer meaning 'fort'.
