= Rutherglen by-election =

Rutherglen by-election may refer to several by-elections in/near Glasgow, Scotland:

- 1931 Rutherglen by-election, following the death of William Wright
- 1964 Rutherglen by-election, following the death of Richard Brooman-White
- 2023 Rutherglen and Hamilton West by-election, following the recall of Margaret Ferrier
