= Allan Chapman =

Allan Chapman may refer to:

- Allan Chapman (historian) (1946–2026), British historian of science
- Allan Chapman (politician) (1897–1966), Scottish Unionist Member of Parliament 1935–1945

== See also ==
- Allen Chapman, American soccer referee
- Allen Chapman (American football)
