= Margaret Ferrier =

Scottish politician (born 1960)

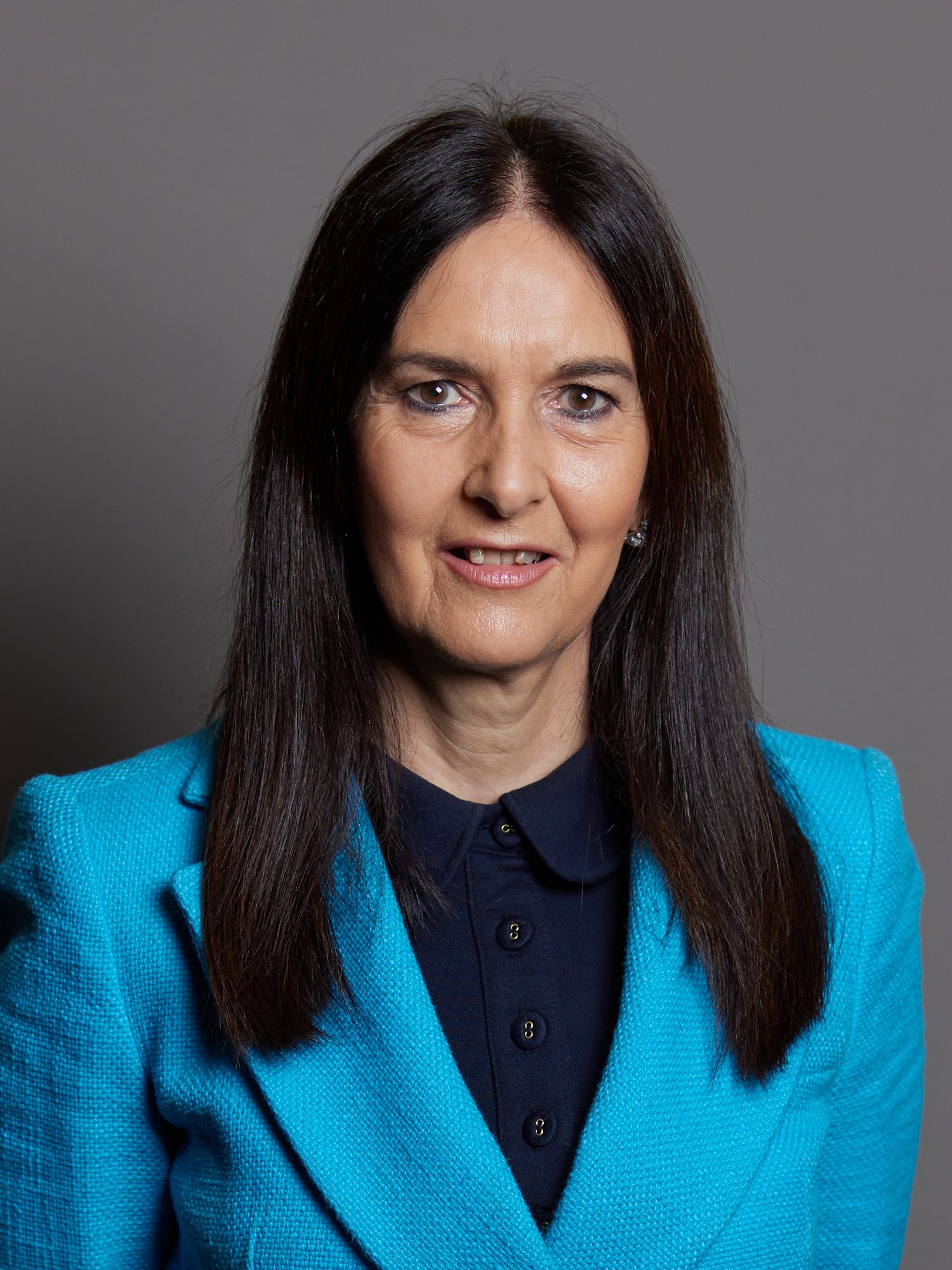
- Official portrait, 2021

Member of Parliament for Rutherglen and Hamilton West
- In office 12 December 2019 – 1 August 2023
- Preceded by: Ged Killen
- Succeeded by: Michael Shanks
- In office 7 May 2015 – 3 May 2017
- Preceded by: Tom Greatrex
- Succeeded by: Ged Killen

Personal details
- Born: 10 September 1960 (age 65) Glasgow, Scotland
- Party: Independent (since 2020)
- Other political affiliations: Scottish National Party (2011–2020)
- Children: 1
- Education: Holyrood Secondary School

Margaret Ferrier (born 10 September 1960) is a Scottish politician who served as Member of Parliament (MP) for Rutherglen and Hamilton West from 2015 to 2017, and again from 2019 to 2023. She was first elected to the House of Commons at the 2015 general election as the Scottish National Party (SNP) candidate for the constituency. She lost her seat to Ged Killen of the Labour Party at the 2017 general election but regained it at the 2019 election.

In 2020, Ferrier was suspended by the SNP and had the party whip withdrawn for breaching COVID-19 lockdown rules. She continued to sit as an independent MP. Nicola Sturgeon, the SNP leader and first minister of Scotland, called on Ferrier to resign her parliamentary seat. She was arrested in January 2021 and charged with "culpable and reckless conduct", for which she pleaded guilty and was later sentenced to community service. In 2023, she was suspended from Parliament for 30 days and a recall petition was opened in Rutherglen and Hamilton West, which unseated her and triggered a by-election. This was the first successful recall petition in Scotland under the Recall of MPs Act 2015.

== Life and career ==
=== Early life and career ===
Ferrier was born on 10 September 1960 and brought up in the district of King's Park in Glasgow, attending Holyrood Secondary School. After living with her family in Mallorca for two years, she moved to Rutherglen from 1972 to 1990 and then resided in Darnley. She has lived in the Halfway district of Cambuslang since 2000, where she joined the Rutherglen branch of the SNP in 2011 (in her youth she had been a Scottish Labour member).

Until 2015, she was a commercial sales supervisor for Terex Equipment, a manufacturing construction company in Motherwell.

=== Political career ===
Before her successful election to Westminster, Ferrier was previously a candidate for the Rutherglen South ward of South Lanarkshire Council in a 2013 by-election (following the death of Anne Higgins). She lost the election to Ged Killen of Scottish Labour.

She became the member of Parliament (MP) for Rutherglen and Hamilton West after winning the seat at the 2015 general election; she achieved 30,279 votes, 52 per cent of the total cast and a 31-per-cent swing from the previous incumbent and their party. She was the first female MP, and the first for the SNP, to be elected in the Rutherglen/Cambuslang portion of the constituency or its predecessor constituency of Rutherglen; Winnie Ewing had previously served a short spell as the representative of the original constituency of Hamilton for the SNP.

Ferrier narrowly lost the seat in the June 2017 election to Killen by 265 votes. She stood as a candidate in the 2019 European Parliament election. She was again selected as the SNP candidate for the seat in the 2019 general election, where she defeated Killen on a 5-per-cent swing and gained a majority of 5,240 votes, or 9.7 per cent.

==== Breaches of COVID-19 regulations and resignation ====
On 1 October 2020, Ferrier made a public statement apologising for serious breaches of regulations imposed during the COVID-19 pandemic in the United Kingdom. Five days earlier, on 26 September, she first noted symptoms of COVID-19 and took a test. She visited a gym, a beauty salon and a gift shop on the same day, and gave a reading at a church service on 27 September. Ferrier took a train from Scotland to London on 28 September and spoke in a debate in the House of Commons that evening. She received a positive COVID-19 test result on the same day and returned to Scotland the next morning, again by train, having told her party whip that a family member was unwell. Following her public statement, Ferrier was suspended from the SNP, and had the party whip withdrawn, meaning she no longer represented the SNP in Parliament but retained her seat as an independent MP. She referred herself to the police and the parliamentary standards authorities.

SNP leader and Scottish first minister Nicola Sturgeon said on 2 October that Ferrier had been guilty of the "worst breach imaginable". Sturgeon said she had told Ferrier that she should step down as an MP. Sir Lindsay Hoyle, the speaker of the House of Commons, described her actions as "reckless". The Scotsman's Gary Flockhart criticised Ferrier for hypocrisy in calling for government advisor Dominic Cummings to resign after he travelled to County Durham during the national lockdown before being found to have broken the rules herself. Ferrier said that the coronavirus made her act "out of character", an explanation that was dismissed by Sturgeon.

In October 2020, Ferrier's Rutherglen constituency association announced that they had asked her to resign her seat over the scandal, which she refused. In the same month, the Metropolitan Police said they would be taking no further action on the matter.

On 12 November 2020, Ferrier made her first appearance in the Commons since breaching COVID-19 regulations. In view of the circumstances, Richard Leonard, the leader of Scottish Labour, described the appearance as "a gross insult to her constituents". He accused her of gross selfishness and started a petition for her resignation from parliament.

On 4 January 2021, Ferrier was arrested and charged by Police Scotland with "culpable and reckless conduct". On 3 February 2021 she appeared at Glasgow Sheriff Court; no plea or declaration was made and she was given bail. She pleaded guilty to the charge on 18 August 2022, and on 13 September was sentenced to 270 hours of community service.

On 30 March 2023, the Commons Select Committee on Standards recommended that she be suspended from Parliament for 30 days. She lost her subsequent appeal on the recommendation, which was upheld on 22 May 2023 with the independent panel finding that she "acted with blatant and deliberate dishonest intent. She acted with a high degree of recklessness to the public and to colleagues and staff at the House of Commons. She acted selfishly, putting her own interests above the public interest." The House of Commons voted to suspend Ferrier for 30 days, which led to a recall petition in Rutherglen and Hamilton West. The result of the petition was declared on 1 August; almost 15 per cent of eligible constituents had signed, unseating Ferrier and triggering a by-election in the constituency. Ferrier confirmed that she would not seek re-election. The by-election, held on 5 October, was won by Michael Shanks of the Labour Party.

== Personal life ==
Ferrier lives in Halfway, South Lanarkshire, with her daughter.

Parliament of the United Kingdom
Preceded by Tom Greatrex	Member of Parliament for Rutherglen and Hamilton West; 2015–2017	Succeeded by Ged Killen
Preceded by Ged Killen	Member of Parliament for Rutherglen and Hamilton West; 2019–2023	Succeeded by Michael Shanks
