= Glasgow Rutherglen (Scottish Parliament constituency) =

Constituency of the Scottish Parliament

- Former burgh constituency for the Scottish Parliament

- Glasgow Rutherglen shown within the Glasgow electoral region and the region shown within Scotland

Former constituency
- Created: 1999
- Abolished: 2011
- Council area: Glasgow City (part); South Lanarkshire (part)
- Replaced by: Rutherglen

Glasgow Rutherglen was a constituency of the Scottish Parliament (Holyrood). It elected one Member of the Scottish Parliament (MSP) by the plurality (first past the post) method of election.

From the 2011 Scottish Parliament election, the seat of Glasgow Rutherglen was redrawn and renamed Rutherglen.

== Electoral region ==
See also Glasgow (Scottish Parliament electoral region)

The region covered the Glasgow City council area and a north-western portion of the South Lanarkshire council area.

== Characteristics ==
The town of Rutherglen is the oldest royal burgh in Scotland, and 500 years older than the royal burgh of Glasgow. At its northern and western borders it blends into Glasgow's suburbs and the vast Castlemilk housing scheme. It was traditionally a Conservative seat, and has always striven to maintain some autonomy since it was absorbed by Glasgow in the 1970s. However, the changes in the 1970s led the Westminster constituency to be mostly made up of council estates south-east of the Glasgow city centre and it became a Labour safe seat. The seat included not only Rutherglen itself but also the town of Cambuslang, and the housing schemes at Fernhill, Toryglen and Whitlawburn. Steel and pottery have been major industries in the past, but both have been in decline over the last 30 years. Although now mostly outside Glasgow local government area, the constituency was still seen as a safe Labour seat. There were no surprises in the 1999 elections, which saw Janis Hughes win the seat with a majority of 25% of the vote.

== Member of the Scottish Parliament ==
Election	Member	Party
1999	Janis Hughes	Labour
2007	James Kelly	Labour
2011	Constituency redrawn; see Rutherglen	

== Election results ==
2007 Scottish Parliament election: Glasgow Rutherglen
Party	Candidate	Votes	%	±%
Labour Co-op	James Kelly	10,237	42.2	−3.6
SNP	Margaret Park	5,857	24.2	+9.3
Liberal Democrats	Robert Brown	5,516	22.7	+3.6
Conservative	Christina Harcus	2,094	8.6	−2.0
Scottish Christian	Tom Greig	548	2.3	New
Majority		4,380	18.0	−8.7
Turnout		24,252	48.5	+0.9
Labour Co-op hold		Swing	-6.5	

2003 Scottish Parliament election: Glasgow Rutherglen
Party	Candidate	Votes	%	±%
Labour	Janis Hughes	10,794	45.8	−0.5
Liberal Democrats	Robert Brown	4,491	19.1	−0.9
SNP	Anne McLaughlin	3,517	14.9	−6.3
Conservative	Gavin Brown	2,499	10.6	+2.6
Scottish Socialist	Bill Bonnar	2,259	9.6	+6.7
Majority		6,303	26.7	+1.6
Turnout		23,560	47.6	
Labour hold		Swing	-0.5	

1999 Scottish Parliament election: Glasgow Rutherglen
Party	Candidate	Votes	%	±%
Labour	Janis Hughes	13,442	46.3	N/A
SNP	Tom Chalmers	6,155	21.2	N/A
Liberal Democrats	Robert Brown	5,798	20.0	N/A
Conservative	Iain Stewart	2,315	8.0	N/A
Scottish Socialist	Bill Bonnar	832	2.9	N/A
Socialist Labour	James Nisbet	481	1.6	N/A
Majority		7,287	25.1	N/A
Turnout		15,583		N/A
Labour win (new seat)				

== See also ==
- Rutherglen (UK Parliament constituency)
- Politics of Glasgow
