= 2023 Rutherglen and Hamilton West by-election =

Scottish UK parliamentary by-election

- 5 October 2023

Rutherglen and Hamilton West constituency
- Turnout: 37.2% (▼29.3pp)
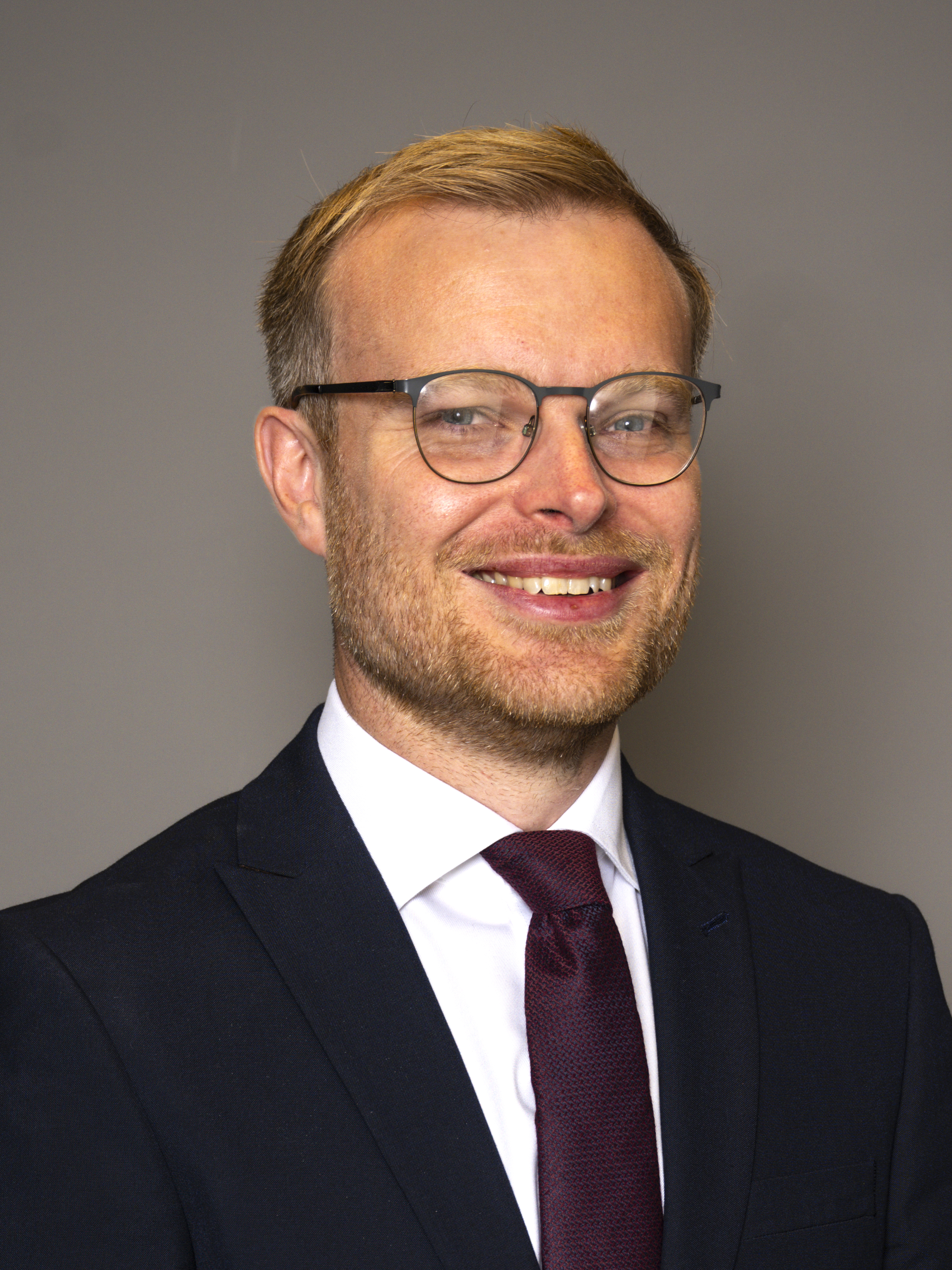
		SNP
Candidate	Michael Shanks	Katy Loudon
Party	Labour Co-op	SNP
Popular vote	17,845	8,399
Percentage	58.6%	27.6%
Swing	▲24.1pp	▼16.6pp
MP before election
Margaret Ferrier
Independent
Elected MP
Michael Shanks
Labour and Co-operative

A by-election for the United Kingdom parliamentary constituency of Rutherglen and Hamilton West was held on 5 October 2023, following the recall of incumbent Scottish National Party (SNP) MP Margaret Ferrier. The by-election was won by Michael Shanks of the Labour Party with a large swing of 20.4%.

Ferrier, elected for the SNP, was suspended from her party in October 2020 after it emerged she had significantly breached COVID-19 restrictions. She was subsequently charged and sentenced. In June 2023, Ferrier was suspended from the House of Commons in for 30 days in relation to her actions in 2020. In accordance with the Recall of MPs Act 2015, this suspension triggered a recall petition in the constituency, which was successful, resulting in her removal from the seat and thus triggering a by-election.

== Constituency ==
Boundary of the Rutherglen and Hamilton West constituency in Scotland

Rutherglen and Hamilton West is a suburban constituency in Greater Glasgow, stretching eastwards along the River Clyde and south into Lanarkshire. A former centre of heavy industry, its historical coal mining industry died out as far back as 1950. Significant swathes of the seat have been highlighted as some of the most deprived areas of Scotland. Most constituents live in the towns of Blantyre, Cambuslang and Rutherglen and the western parts of the town of Hamilton.

The constituency was created for the 2005 general election, out of the abolished Glasgow Rutherglen and Hamilton South constituencies. Labour MP Tommy McAvoy, who was the longest-serving government whip, stood down at the 2010 election, and the seat was retained for the party by Tom Greatrex with an increased majority.

The constituency was regarded as a safe seat for Labour until the 2015 general election, when Margaret Ferrier took it from Greatrex by nearly 10,000 votes amidst a Scottish National Party landslide. In the snap 2017 general election, the seat was taken back by Labour's Ged Killen with a majority of just 265 votes. In the 2019 general election, Ferrier defeated Killen by a majority of 5,000 votes, nonetheless making it one of the most marginal SNP seats in Scotland.

== Recall petition ==
=== Background ===
Ferrier, standing for the Scottish National Party (SNP), was first elected MP for the constituency in the 2015 general election, lost her seat in 2017 and then regained it in 2019. In September 2020, Ferrier made serious breaches of COVID-19 regulations. She noted symptoms of COVID-19 and took a test, then visited various public places. She took a train from Scotland to London, on 28 September, and while waiting for results, she spoke in a parliamentary debate that evening. She received a positive test result the same evening and returned to Scotland the next morning, again by train.

Ferrier was subsequently suspended from the SNP, and referred herself to the police and the Parliamentary standards authorities. On 4 January 2021, she was arrested and charged by Police Scotland with "culpable and reckless conduct." She pleaded guilty and was sentenced to 270 hours of community service.

On 30 March 2023, the Commons Select Committee on Standards, recommended that she be suspended from Parliament for 30 days. She lost her appeal on the recommendation on 22 May 2023 with the independent panel finding that she "acted with blatant and deliberate dishonest intent. She acted with a high degree of recklessness to the public and to colleagues and staff at the House of Commons. She acted selfishly, putting her own interests above the public interest." On 6 June 2023, the House of Commons voted to suspend Ferrier for 30 days. The Recall of MPs Act 2015 provides that a recall petition is automatically initiated by any of several events happening to an MP, one of which is suspension from the House of Commons for a period of more than 10 sitting days or 14 calendar days.

Parliament was in recess when the petition closed; the SNP moved the writ of election on the first day after it reconvened, fixing the by-election for 5 October, the earliest available date. By-elections in Mid Bedfordshire and Tamworth would be held a fortnight later, on 19 October.

The by-election was the first in Scotland under the provisions of the Elections Act 2022 that required voters to show a form of identification (ID) in order to vote.

=== Petition process ===
On 6 June 2023, South Lanarkshire Council was formally notified by Speaker of the House of Commons that a petition was to be opened. The petition opened at 9am on 20 June 2023 for a period of six weeks, closing at 5pm on 31 July. Electors were able to sign in person at seven locations within the constituency, as well as via post or proxy.

At the announcement of the petition, the electorate of the constituency was determined to be 81,124 persons, meaning that 8,113 signatures were required for the petition to succeed. Per the petition rules, no information on the progress of the petition was reported until the end of the signing period. The Labour Party and the SNP were both registered as campaigners for the success of the petition.

It was the fourth petition to occur since the procedure was introduced, as well as the first in Scotland and the second petition during the present Parliament.

On 1 August, it was announced that 11,896 people had signed the petition, exceeding the threshold and triggering the by-election. It was the first by-election during the premiership of Humza Yousaf.

== Campaign ==
Anticipating the vacancy, campaigning began before the closure of the petition. The Scottish Labour leader, Anas Sarwar, and the SNP leader, Humza Yousaf, both repeatedly visited the seat, which was seen as an SNP/Labour marginal. The contest was the first major electoral test of Yousaf's period as SNP leader and First Minister. It was also described as a "must-win" for Labour under Keir Starmer.

Commentator Polly Toynbee suggested that one issue in the by-election would be the two-child benefit cap. Labour support the cap, whereas the SNP and the Greens oppose it. However, Labour's candidate Michael Shanks supports abolishing the cap and pledged to vote to scrap it should he win the seat, disagreeing with the party leadership on the matter. He also supports gender self-identification, which Starmer opposes. UK Labour deputy leader Angela Rayner suggested that Shanks would not be disciplined for voting against the party whip on the two-child benefit cap in parliament. However, SNP leader Humza Yousaf dismissed Shanks' claims to oppose the cap, claiming that a Labour MP would "do whatever... Keir Starmer tells him to do". The Economist reported that the ambivalence of SNP voters in the constituency as a result of the resignation of Nicola Sturgeon was a bad sign for the SNP holding the seat.

One local issue commented on by candidates was council tax in South Lanarkshire, which was set to rise, exacerbating the cost-of-living crisis. The local council had been in controversy following the suspension of the Labour council leader Joe Fagan in June for reportedly "leaking classified information". On 25 August he survived a no confidence vote to remove him as head of the local authority. The local Labour party had been also criticised by councillor Mathew Buchanan (East Kilbride South), who wrote to Leader of the Scottish Labour Party Anas Sarwar alerting him to the allegedly "toxic culture" of the group. On 15 August, Keir Starmer and Anas Sarwar met with voters at Rutherglen Town Hall. On 21 August, deputy Labour leaders Jackie Baillie and Angela Rayner campaigned in the seat. Yousaf visited a nursery with Loudon on 15 September.

The Scottish Conservative leader Douglas Ross was accused of avoiding the by-election campaign. He said he would visit the constituency at a later date but did not. Just before the election, plans of tactical voting (Conservatives switching to Labour to ensure SNP defeat) were reported.

== Candidates ==
Anticipating its success, some candidates were selected by parties before the closure of the petition. Ferrier confirmed on 1 August that she would not stand for re-election. Nominations closed on 12 September.

Labour selected their candidate, Michael Shanks, in anticipation that the by-election would occur. Shanks was the Labour candidate in Glasgow North West at the 2017 general election. Shanks had resigned from the party on the day of the 2019 European Parliament election, citing antisemitism in the party and "complacency" with regards to Brexit, but re-joined after Keir Starmer's election as leader. The others shortlisted were Dr Greg Irwin, Aberdeen councillor Deena Tissera and South Lanarkshire councillor Maureen Devlin.

On 9 June 2023, the SNP selected local councillor and former primary school teacher Katy Loudon as their candidate. She is a member of South Lanarkshire Council, representing the Cambuslang East ward.

On 27 August, the Alba Party announced that they would not contest the by-election "to prevent splitting the pro-independence vote".

On 12 June, the Trade Unionist and Socialist Coalition (TUSC) announced that Unison shop steward Chris Sermanni would be their candidate. He campaigned on "above-inflation pay and benefit rises, and socialist nationalisation of energy, the banks, and big industries like Royal Mail".

The Scottish Socialist Party chose Bill Bonnar as their candidate. He campaigned on a £15 an hour minimum wage and scrapping zero-hours contracts in favour of guaranteed minimum hours. Bonnar made a pledge to "take no more than the average skilled worker's wage" if elected.

On 3 August, the Scottish Conservatives selected Thomas Kerr as their candidate. Kerr has been a member of Glasgow City Council for Shettleston Ward since 2017. He became leader of the Conservative grouping on the council in 2019 after serving as deputy for two years.

On 7 August, Reform UK announced David Stark as their candidate. Stark, a retired architect, previously stood as the Conservative Party candidate for the Cumbernauld East ward in the 2017 North Lanarkshire Council election.

On 11 August, the Scottish Liberal Democrats selected Gloria Adebo as their candidate. Adebo previously stood as a candidate for the party in the Rutherglen Central and North ward in the 2022 South Lanarkshire Council election.

Volt UK selected Ewan Hoyle as their candidate. He previously stood as a candidate for the party in the Pollokshields ward in the 2022 Glasgow City Council election. Formerly a Liberal Democrat, he previously stood as a candidate in Glasgow South in the 2015 and 2017 general elections, and Hamilton, Larkhill and Stonehouse in the 2011 Scottish Parliament election.

Cameron Eadie, a 20-year-old student at the University of Glasgow, stood for the Scottish Greens.

== Result ==
Bar chart of the election result.

Michael Shanks won the seat with a 20.4% SNP-to-Labour swing, winning over twice as many votes as second-placed SNP candidate Katy Loudon. Of the fourteen candidates that stood in the by-election, only Shanks and Loudon received over 5% of the vote and therefore retained their deposits. The turnout was 37.2%.

2023 Rutherglen and Hamilton West by-election
Party	Candidate	Votes	%	±%
Labour Co-op	Michael Shanks	17,845	58.6	▲24.1
SNP	Katy Loudon	8,399	27.6	▼16.6
Conservative	Thomas Kerr	1,192	3.9	▼11.1
Liberal Democrats	Gloria Adebo	895	2.9	▼2.3
Green	Cameron Eadie	601	2.0	New
Reform	David Stark	403	1.3	New
Scottish Family	Niall Fraser	319	1.0	New
Scottish Socialist	Bill Bonnar	271	0.9	New
ISP	Colette Walker	207	0.7	New
TUSC	Christopher Sermanni	178	0.6	New
Independent	Andrew Daly	81	0.3	New
Volt	Ewan Hoyle	46	0.2	New
No description	Prince Ankit Love, Emperor of India	34	0.1	New
No description	Garry Cooke	6	0.0	New
Majority		9,446	31.0	N/A
Turnout		30,477	37.2	▼29.3
Labour Co-op gain from SNP		Swing	▲20.4	

== Aftermath and analysis ==
This was the first Westminster by-election in which the SNP lost a seat it was defending.

The variables in voting trend analysis associated with by-elections and low turnouts notwithstanding, it was calculated that Labour would win 42 seats if the 20% swing was replicated across Scotland in a general election (more than in 2010); Professor John Curtice of the University of Strathclyde said that Labour had momentum comparable to that which they had before the 1997 landslide. The Scottish Conservatives blamed 'tactical voting' as a cause of the collapse of the Conservative vote, and the Electoral Reform Society raised concerns of the effects of the recently introduced photo-ID requirement.

First Minister of Scotland Humza Yousaf called the result "disappointing". The poor SNP result was attributed by some commentators to Yousaf's premiership, which the SNP's Westminster leader Stephen Flynn rejected.

Labour Leader Keir Starmer remarked that Shanks "blew the doors off". BBC political editor Chris Mason called the election a "thunderbolt of a result" The by-election was followed two weeks later by two more in Mid Bedfordshire and Tamworth, both of which were also Labour gains.

== Previous result ==
General election 2019: Rutherglen and Hamilton West
Party	Candidate	Votes	%	±%
SNP	Margaret Ferrier	23,775	44.2	+7.2
Labour Co-op	Ged Killen	18,545	34.5	–3.0
Conservative	Lynne Nailon	8,054	15.0	–4.5
Liberal Democrats	Mark McGeever	2,791	5.2	+1.0
UKIP	Janice MacKay	629	1.2	+0.3
Majority		5,230	9.7	N/A
Turnout		53,794	66.5	+3.0
SNP gain from Labour Co-op		Swing	+5.1	

== See also ==
- List of United Kingdom by-elections (2010–present)
