= Nuclear Industry Association =

- Abbreviation: NIA
- Formation: 1963
- Type: Trade association
- Legal status: Private Limited Company by guarantee without share capital use of 'Limited' exemption
- Headquarters: Kingsway, London, WC2
- Region served: United Kingdom
- Members: c. 280 civil nuclear industry companies
- Chief Executive: Tom Greatrex
- Chair: Lord Iain McNicol
- Website: www.niauk.org
- Formerly called: British Nuclear Industry Forum (BNIF)

The Nuclear Industry Association (NIA) is the trade association for the civil nuclear industry in the UK, representing over 280 member companies across the supply chain.

== Members ==
The NIA represents companies across the nuclear supply chain, including the operators of the nuclear power stations, those engaged in decommissioning, waste management, nuclear liabilities management and all aspects of the nuclear fuel cycle, nuclear equipment suppliers, engineering and construction firms, nuclear research organisations, and legal, financial and consultancy companies.

== Leadership ==
Tom Greatrex is the NIA's chief executive. Appointed in February 2016, he succeeded Keith Parker, who had been chief executive for more than a decade. Tom Greatrex was the Member of Parliament (MP) for Rutherglen and Hamilton West between 2010 and 2015. During this time, he served as the Shadow Minister for Scotland and the Shadow Minister for the Department of Energy and Climate Change.

A board of directors, made up of nuclear industry professionals, oversees the organisation's direction. The chair is Lord Iain McNicol.

== Services ==
The NIA organises business group meetings. NIA members can access a Trade Directory to find products and services from UK-based companies in the nuclear sector. Member subscriptions pay for all NIA activity.

== Conferences ==
The NIA hosts conferences about the UK nuclear industry, covering topics from decommissioning to new build. The NIA also hosts an annual conference. Previous annual conference speakers include the Energy Ministers Charles Hendry, Andrea Leadsom, and Ed Miliband.

== Campaigns ==
The NIA ran a campaign called "re: generation" that aimed to engage young people on issues related to energy, the types of jobs available in the nuclear sector through the apprenticeship and graduate routes and the nuclear industry’s STEM initiatives.

== Publications ==
- The Jobs Map, showing statistics about the jobs in the civil nuclear industry across the UK
- Industry Link, the NIA's quarterly membership magazine

== See also ==
- Department for Business, Energy and Industrial Strategy
- FORATOM
- Nuclear Decommissioning Authority
- United Kingdom Atomic Energy Authority
- World Association of Nuclear Operators
- World Energy Council
- World Nuclear Association
