= Gregor Mackenzie =

British politician (1927–1992)

James Gregor Mackenzie (15 November 1927 – 4 May 1992) was a British Labour Party politician.

== Early life ==
Mackenzie was educated at the Royal Technical College and the University of Glasgow. He became a sales manager and a councillor on Glasgow Corporation from 1952.

== Political career ==
Mackenzie contested Aberdeenshire East in 1950 and Kinross and Western Perthshire in 1959. He became Member of Parliament for Glasgow Rutherglen at a 1964 by-election (where he narrowly beat Norman Buchan at the Labour Party selection meeting). He served until his retirement at the 1987 general election. He was Parliamentary Private Secretary to the Chancellor of the Exchequer from 1966. In the 1970s he served as a minister at the Department of Industry and the Scottish Office.

Parliament of the United Kingdom
Preceded by Richard Brooman-White	Member of Parliament for Glasgow Rutherglen; 1964–1987	Succeeded by Tommy McAvoy
