= Scottish Mutual Assurance =

Scottish insurance company

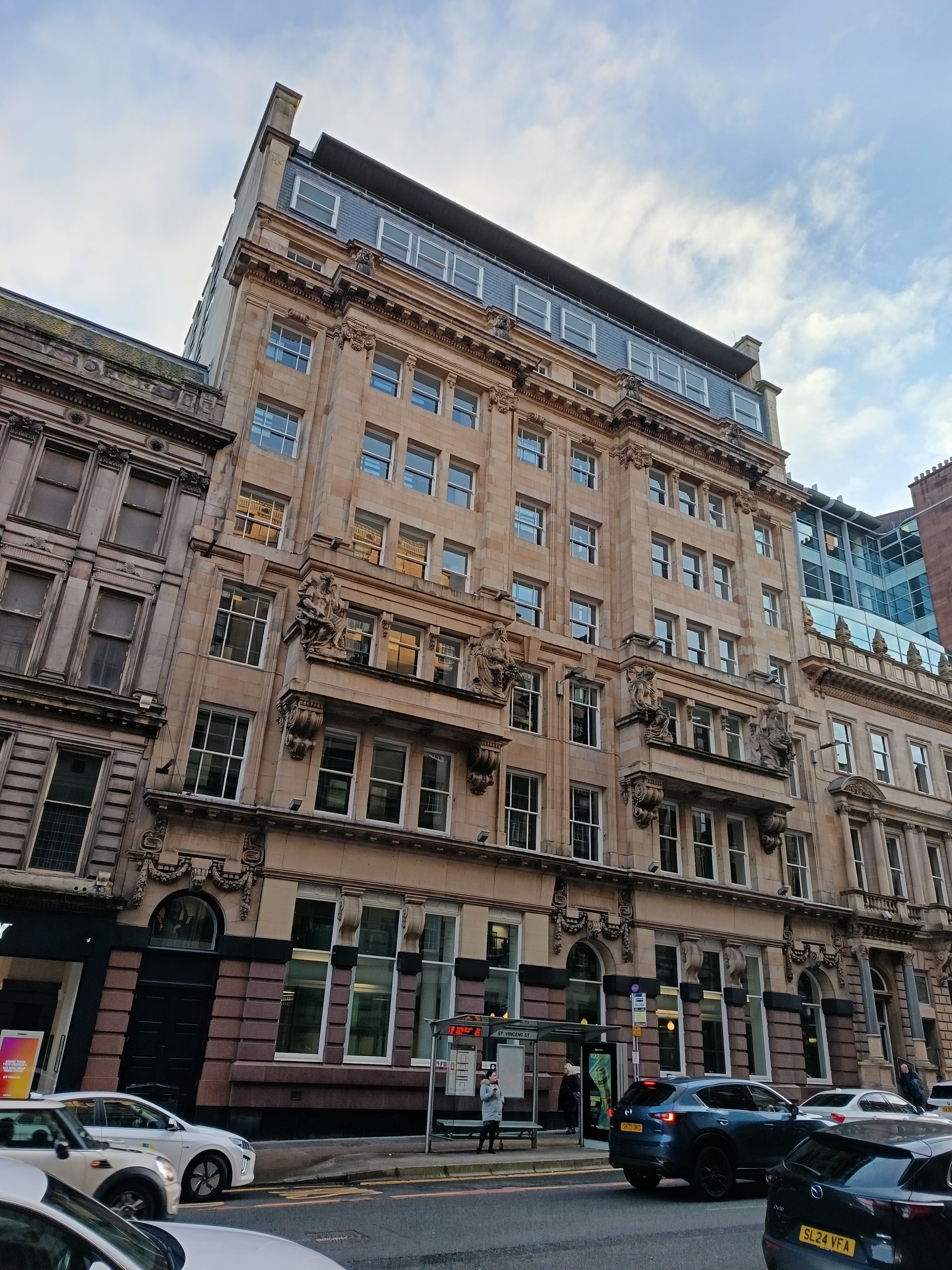
- The company's head office at 109 St Vincent Street, Glasgow
- Industry: Insurance
- Founded: 1883; 143 years ago
- Defunct: 1992
- Fate: Acquired by Abbey National
- Headquarters: Glasgow, Scotland

Scottish Mutual Assurance was formed in 1883 as the Scottish Temperance Life Assurance Society, intended as the only life assurance company serving exclusively abstainers. It was renamed Scottish Mutual Assurance in 1951 and acquired by Abbey National in 1991.

== History ==
=== Formation ===
The Scottish Temperance Life Assurance was founded in 1883 in Glasgow as Scotland's first insurance company, intended exclusively for total abstainers. Ironically, the founder, Adam Keir Rodger, was a brewer’s son. Rodger, self-taught, became a partner in a local accountancy firm at the age of 21. With his brothers, Rodger was an enthusiastic evangelist and his belief in the value of thrift led him to research the provision of insurance with the same diligence as he had researched accountancy. He first developed insurance as a sideline in his accountancy firm of Smith Rodger & Co before proposing a new insurance company. He obtained the support of Sir William Collins, President of the Scottish Temperance League and directors were drawn from prominent local businessmen, with John Wilson M.P. as chairman. A public prospectus to raise the initial £20,000 capital was issued. The policies were directed at the “artisan class” and offered an expected ten per cent lower premium than charged by other insurers to non-abstainers. Before the Society had even been launched at its Glasgow office, provisional directors were appointed for Edinburgh, Aberdeen and Dundee. At the same time, agents were recruited from across the country.

=== The merger ===
Within its first decade, the society was operating out of eleven branches covering the larger cities, including London, Birmingham and Liverpool. A particular success for the society was a novel house mortgage scheme pioneered at the turn of the century, whereby the society provided the loan, with the principal covered by its own life assurance policy. World War I caused a rise in claims, a fall in investment values and increased costs; like other life companies, the policy holders bonus was passed. Six months later, the Society received a merger approach from the London firm, British General Insurance, a fire accident and marine insurer, later described by The Times as "Another Insurance Fusion Scheme". In 1920 the two merged under the name of Scottish Temperance and British General Assurance. The merger was effected by an exchange of shares creating cross holdings and each society retained its separate identity. In the event, it proved unsuccessful and there was a demerger in 1925. (The British General was acquired by the Commercial Union in 1926).

=== Mutualisation ===
Scottish Mutual Assurance Society Act 1952
- Act of Parliament
- Parliament of the United Kingdom
- Long title: An Act to incorporate the Scottish Mutual Assurance Society to provide for the control and management of the Society as a mutual assurance society and for the conversion of its share capital into stock to confer further powers on the Society and for other purposes.
- Citation: 15 & 16 Geo. 6 & 1 Eliz. 2. c. xxxix

Dates
- Royal assent: 1 August 1952

Text of statute as originally enacted

The percentage of profit allotted to policy holders had been gradually increased from 80 per cent to 90 per cent. One of the terms of the merger agreement had been to increase this further to 95%. Most of the few outstanding shares in Scottish Temperance were bought in so that by 1926 the society was, in effect, operating as a mutual society. However, it was another 25 years before an Act of Parliament regularised this. From its foundation, A. K. Rodgers continued to guide the society; it was not until 1933 that Rodgers finally retired as the manager aged 78; he remained as chairman for another ten years and a director until 1945. The Act to formally convert the society to its mutual status was passed in 1952. As part of the process, consideration was given to the society's name. It was believed that "Temperance" was off-putting to prospective customers and in February 1951 the name was changed to Scottish Mutual Assurance Society. Ten years after the name change, the number of policies issued had trebled.

=== The final chapter ===
Helped by inflation, the increased adoption of pension coverage and additional branches (23 by 1977) premium income rose from £3.5 million in 1962 to £42 million in 1981. However, the independent mutuals were gradually coming under pressure from the large quoted financial companies. In September 1991 the Abbey National made an offer of £285 million for Scottish Mutual. This met with some resistance from policy holders but the chairman warned members that cost and regulation pressures were making it harder for society to compete. Approval was given at an extraordinary general meeting in the November. The transfer was formally completed 1 January 1992.

== Premises ==
The company was based at 105–109 St Vincent Street in Glasgow throughout most of its existence.
