= Michael Shanks (politician) =

British politician (born 1988)

Michael Shanks MP
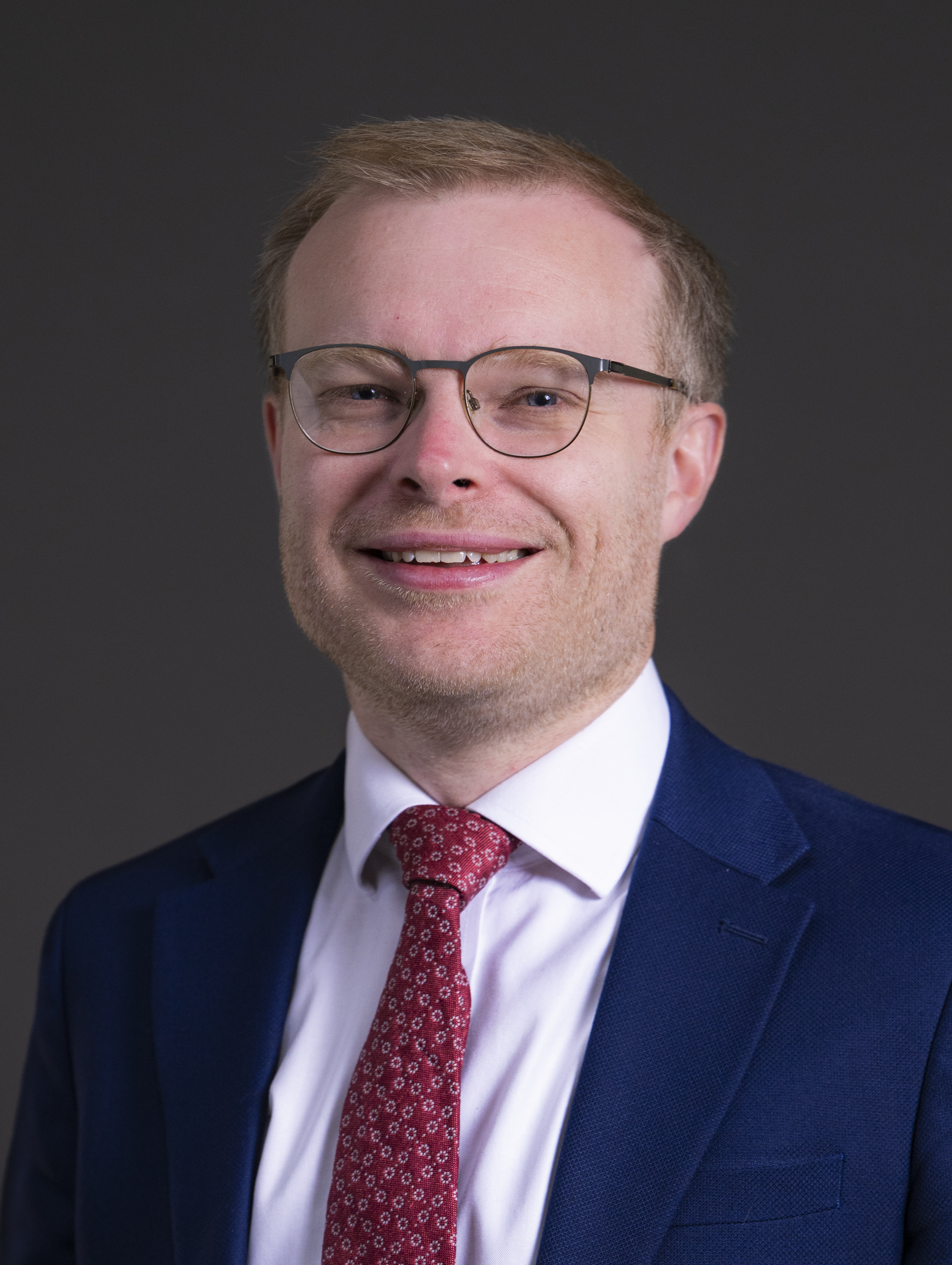
- Official portrait, 2026

Minister of State for Energy (Note: Known as Parliamentary Under-Secretary before September 2025.)
- Incumbent
- Assumed office 9 July 2024
- Prime Minister: Keir Starmer; Andy Burnham
- Preceded by: Justin Tomlinson (Note: As Minister of State for Energy Security and Net Zero.)

Member of Parliament for Rutherglen Rutherglen and Hamilton West (2023–2024)
- Incumbent
- Assumed office 5 October 2023
- Preceded by: Margaret Ferrier
- Majority: 8,767 (20.6%)
Shadow portfolios
2023–2024	Scotland

Personal details
- Born: Michael Graeme Shanks; 4 March 1988 (age 38) Ayrshire, Scotland
- Party: Scottish Labour (until 2019; since 2020)
- Education: University of Glasgow

Michael Graeme Shanks (born 4 March 1988) is a Scottish Labour Party politician and former teacher who has served as the Member of Parliament (MP) for Rutherglen, previously Rutherglen and Hamilton West, since 2023. He has served as Minister of State for Energy since 6 September 2025.

== Early life and career ==
Michael Shanks was born on 4 March 1988 in Ayrshire. He has a degree in history and politics from the University of Glasgow, and worked for a charity before retraining as a teacher in his late 20s, taking a PGDE at Glasgow. He was employed as a modern studies teacher at Park Mains High School in Erskine, Renfrewshire. He has also been involved in community and charity initiatives for disabled people and ran a scout group for disabled children.

== Political career ==
Shanks was an unsuccessful candidate in the 2012 Glasgow City Council election, standing for Scottish Labour in the ward of Partick West and finishing fifth in the single transferable vote process. Four councillors were elected for the ward, making Shanks the only Labour Party candidate in Glasgow not to be elected.

At the 2016 Scottish Parliament election, Shanks contested Glasgow Kelvin. He came third with 21% of the vote behind the incumbent SNP MSP, Sandra White, and the Scottish Greens, candidate Patrick Harvie.

Shanks contested Glasgow North West at the snap 2017 general election, coming second with 35.9% of the vote behind the incumbent SNP MP Carol Monaghan.

Shanks resigned from the Labour Party on the day of the 2019 European Parliament election in the United Kingdom, citing Brexit and antisemitism in the party during Jeremy Corbyn's leadership, but rejoined when Keir Starmer became leader.

He is a member of the Fabian Society.

== Parliamentary career ==
Having moved to Rutherglen from western Glasgow a year earlier, Shanks was selected to contest the Rutherglen and Hamilton West constituency in May 2023, in anticipation that Margaret Ferrier, the incumbent MP who had been sanctioned for breaches of COVID-19 restrictions, would lose her seat via a recall petition. Following her suspension from the House of Commons, Ferrier was unseated by a successful recall petition on 1 August. In the subsequent by-election on 5 October, Shanks was elected to Parliament as MP for Rutherglen and Hamilton West with 58.6% of the vote and a majority of 9,446.

Prior to his election to Parliament, Shanks "said that he wasn't 'against' rejoining the EU and insisted he has not changed his principles over Brexit but that now was not the right time for a debate on the issue". During his by-election campaign Shanks said he would vote to abolish the two-child benefit cap. Despite this, in July 2024 he voted with the incoming Labour government to keep the benefit cap. He supported the Gender Recognition Reform (Scotland) Bill but said that "it could be much, much better".

Shanks sat as the Shadow Minister of State for Scotland in the Starmer shadow cabinet, junior to Shadow Secretary of State Ian Murray, the only other Scottish Labour MP at the time. His promotion made him the MP who had served for the shortest length of time before being promoted to the Labour frontbench.

He is a member of Labour Friends of Israel as well as Labour Friends of Palestine and the Middle East. On 16 November 2023, a motion was tabled in Parliament calling for a ceasefire in the Gaza war, with Shanks abstaining.

Due to the 2023 review of Westminster constituencies, Shanks' constituency of Rutherglen and Hamilton West was abolished, and replaced with Rutherglen. At the 2024 general election, Shanks was elected to Parliament as MP for Rutherglen with 50.5% of the vote and a majority of 8,767. After the general election, Shanks was appointed as Parliamentary Under-Secretary of State in the Department for Energy Security and Net Zero, under Secretary of State Ed Miliband. In the 2025 British cabinet reshuffle, Shanks was promoted to Minister of State for Energy, a role jointly across the Department for Business and Trade and Department for Energy Security and Net Zero.

In July 2026, he was reappointed to the new government as Minister of State at the Department for Energy Security and Net Zero by Andy Burnham.

== Personal life ==
In January 2022, Shanks received news coverage for running along all of Glasgow's 6,143 streets. He began running during the first COVID-19 lockdown in March 2020, having been motivated by an American athlete who had run every street in San Francisco in 30 days. Shanks described it as an "adventure" as opposed to a fitness challenge and completed it on 5 January 2022, when he ran down the city centre's George Square, which he had saved for last. Whilst running he gathered information about the area from people for a book he is planning on the social history of Glasgow inspired by Hugh MacDonald's 1854 book Rambles Round Glasgow, and created an online journal of the project.

== Notes ==
Parliament of the United Kingdom
Preceded by Margaret Ferrier	Member of Parliament for Rutherglen and Hamilton West; 2023–2024	Constituency abolished
New constituency	Member of Parliament for Rutherglen; 2024–present	Incumbent
