= Adam Keir Rodger =

British politician (1855–1946)

Adam Keir Rodger (1855–1946) was Coalition Liberal MP for Rutherglen from 1918 to 1922. At the age of 27 he started the Scottish Temperance Assurance Society Limited (later known as Scottish Mutual Assurance). The business was launched due to Rodger's faith in temperance. The company nearly went bankrupt when its first policy holder died requiring a payment of £1000. The company later sold a policy to David Lloyd George and is now credited to launching the assurance business in Scotland.

One of his sons, Lawton, died in the Spanish influenza pandemic in the aftermath of the First World War; the other sons William and Jack also served in the conflict and survived, with William later being awarded the Officer of the British Empire for his services to the legal profession.

Parliament of the United Kingdom
| New constituency | Member of Parliament for Rutherglen; 1918 – 1922 | Succeeded by William Wright |
