= Toryglen =

Coordinates: 55.82812°N 4.234629°W

- Inner–city district of Glasgow
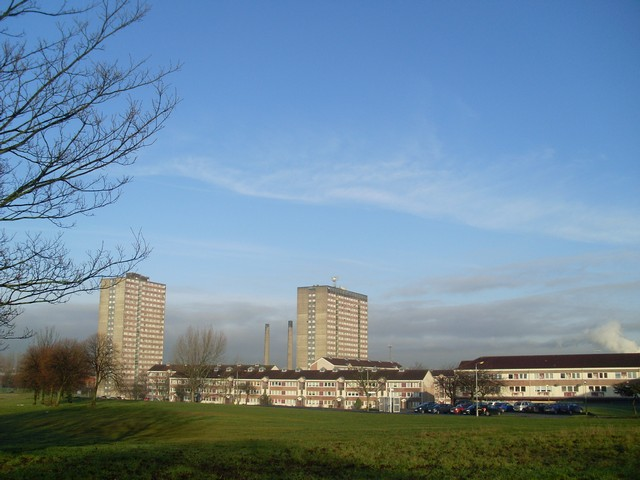
- View of Prospecthill in Toryglen, 2009

- Location within Glasgow
- Population: 4,475
- OS grid reference: NS600616
- Council area: Glasgow City Council
- Lieutenancy area: Glasgow
- Country: Scotland
- Sovereign state: United Kingdom
- Post town: GLASGOW
- Postcode district: G42 0
- Dialling code: 0141
- Police: Scotland
- Fire: Scottish
- Ambulance: Scottish
- UK Parliament: Glasgow Central
- Scottish Parliament: Glasgow Southside

Toryglen is a district in southern Glasgow, Scotland, falling within the Langside ward under Glasgow City Council. It is approximately two miles (three kilometres) south of the city centre, bounded to the west by Mount Florida, the north-west by Polmadie, to the north-east by the West Coast Main Line railway and the M74 motorway the south by King's Park, and immediately to the east by the town of Rutherglen.

== Overview ==
=== Etymology ===
The name 'Torryglen' first appeared on maps in the late 18th century and was a small farmhouse in the north of the present day territory.

=== Geography ===
The area is broadly defined as between the major railway lines to the north, Curtis Avenue to the south and Aikenhead Road to the west. The eastern boundary where Glasgow meets South Lanarkshire (the Rutherglen neighbourhoods of Burnhill and Newfield) is difficult to observe from ground level as it involves houses backing onto one another right up to the border in most places. However, as this is a major administrative divide it is clearly marked on maps, with the street names also changing, e.g. Newfield Place becomes Ardnahoe Avenue.

Toryglen is residential in character, built mainly south of Prospecthill Road between 1947 and 1962 by the Scottish Special Housing Association on land which was previously a farm and a golf course. As well as tenements, the area contains some of the city's early experiments in multi-storey housing, built around 1955 at Prospecthill Crescent (very similar in design to a development at Dryburgh Gardens in Dundee which also still stands).

=== Demography and locale ===
In the northern portion of the district, Prospecthill Circus was a colourful collection of two 23-storey tower blocks, a 20-storey slab block and numerous deck access maisonettes (all since demolished) constructed by the city authorities between 1963 and 1968. When the neighbourhood was at its lowest ebb in the mid-2000s awaiting redevelopment, the local street gang reacted with hostile racist graffiti directed towards asylum seekers being housed in empty properties in the area, with a perception that the incomers were being given priority treatment over locals living in deprivation.

The Malls Mire burn, which has been almost entirely culverted, runs north-east under Hampden Park, the Football Centre and the supermarket, to the west of the Prospecthill Circus area under the railway line and motorway, joins the West/Cityford Burn from Rutherglen which becomes the Polmadie Burn (also known as Jenny's Burn) – once heavily polluted by waste from White's Chemicals at nearby Shawfield – and flows into the River Clyde at Richmond Park. While it was visible above ground, the Malls Mire formed part of the boundary between the ancient counties of Renfrewshire and Lanarkshire; an informal search by a group of local historians in 2020 failed to uncover any of the old boundary stones denoted on maps from the time.

The burn gives its name to an adjacent area of ground between Toryglen and Burnhill (meeting football pitches including the home ground of Rutherglen Glencairn F.C.), which lay overgrown for some years but was cleaned and landscaped in the early 21st century to be maintained as a 'community woodland', and was granted Local nature reserve status in 2015.

=== Sony filming ===
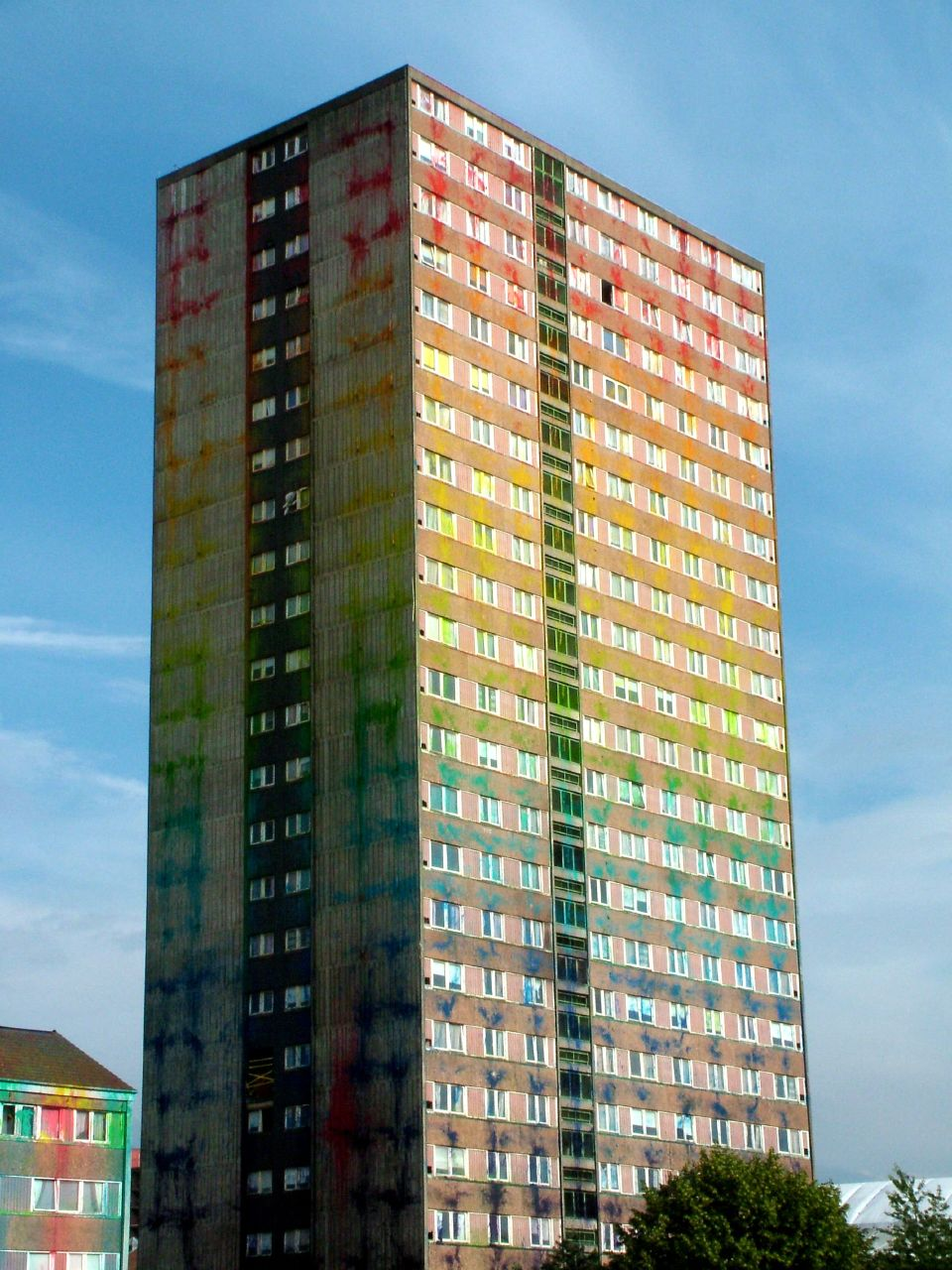
Prospecthill Circus following filming by Sony in 2006 for Bravia televisions

A derelict multi-storey block awaiting demolition in Prospecthill Circus was used in 2006 by SONY to create an advertisement for their BRAVIA range of televisions. The commercial involved the blasting of paint onto disused buildings. The main tower block in the advert was demolished in a controlled explosion on 21 January 2007; the remaining two towers survived for almost a decade before being demolished in stages during late 2016, using a Long reach excavator.

=== Housing ===
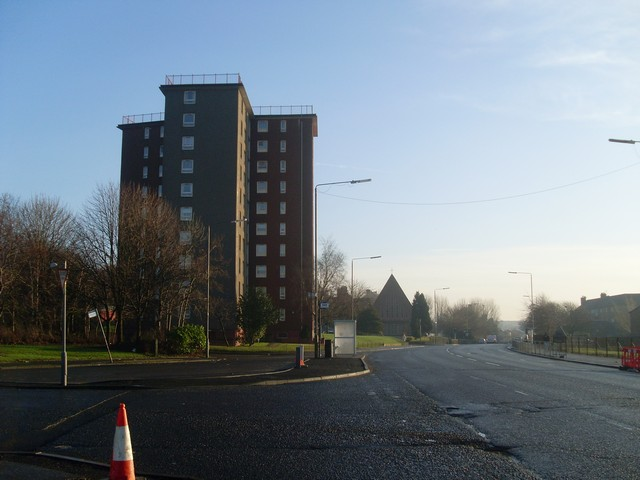
Flats on Prospecthill Crescent with St. Brigid's chapel in the background

'The Circus' underwent comprehensive redevelopment by the Glasgow Housing Association (GHA) in the early 21st century, culminating in a major development by Cruden Homes, with construction taking place between around 2015 and 2018, leaving the area virtually unrecognisable from the way it looked a few years prior.

The 851 tenement flats and 232 tower block apartments in the south of the district (managed by Thistle Housing Association) were also refurbished externally, including brighter rendering and energy efficiency, in the 2010s. The association's management of the properties came under scrutiny during the course of the project which suffered various delays and serious concerns over quality and safety, resulting in some of the houses being transferred to Sanctuary Scotland in 2020 on instruction of the Scottish Housing Regulator.

== Education ==
Between 1967 and 1994, the buildings of Queen's Park Secondary School (originally based at Grange Road, Battlefield) were located in Toryglen. After several years as a derelict plot, the 'Crown Gardens' housing development was built on the site.

The school's football pitches (on the south side of Prospecthill Road) were built into Toryglen Regional Football Centre, as part of Glasgow City Council's plans to boost the city's sporting facilities in the run up to hosting the 2014 Commonwealth Games. On the opposite site of the road there is an Asda superstore, built in 1997.

== Notable people ==
- Charlie Burchill, guitarist and founder member of Simple Minds
- William Haughey, Baron Haughey, businessman
- Benny Higgins, banker
- Janis Hughes, former MSP for the Glasgow Rutherglen constituency.
- Jim Kerr, lead singer and founder member of Simple Minds
- Michael Matheson, politician (Scottish Secretary for Transport, Infrastructure and Connectivity)
- Christine McKenna, British actress active during the 1970s and 1980s, "Christina" in the television series Flambards

== See also ==
- Glasgow tower blocks
