= Gilbert McAllister =

British politician (1906–1964)

Member of Parliament for Rutherglen
- In office 5 July 1945 – 5 October 1951
- Preceded by: Allan Chapman
- Succeeded by: Richard Brooman-White

Personal details
- Born: 26 March 1906
- Died: 27 May 1964 (aged 58)
- Party: Labour

Gilbert McAllister (26 March 1906 – 27 May 1964) was a British Labour Party politician. He unsuccessfully contested the North Lanarkshire constituency in 1935, and came in at second at the 1937 Glasgow Hillhead by-election.

At the 1945 general election McAllister was elected as member of parliament (MP) for Rutherglen. He held that seat for six years, until his defeat at the 1951 election by the Conservative Party candidate Richard Brooman-White.

Parliament of the United Kingdom
Preceded by Allan Chapman	Member of Parliament for Rutherglen; 1945–1951	Succeeded by Richard Brooman-White
