= Janis Hughes =

Scottish politician (born 1958)

Member of the Scottish Parliament for Glasgow Rutherglen
- In office 6 May 1999 – 2 April 2007
- Preceded by: New Parliament
- Succeeded by: James Kelly

Personal details
- Born: 1 May 1958 (age 67) Glasgow, Scotland, UK
- Party: Scottish Labour

Janis Hughes (born 1 May 1958) is a Scottish Labour Party politician, who was a Member of the Scottish Parliament (MSP) for Glasgow Rutherglen constituency from 1999 to 2007. In the inaugural election to the parliament in 1999, Hughes won a 25% majority; this increased to nearly 27% in the 2003 election, despite her accruing almost 3,000 fewer votes. In both elections, around 45% of the votes cast were in her favour.

Prior to her election she worked as a nurse and an NHS administrator. She stood down as an MSP at the 2007 election.

She resided in the Toryglen area of Glasgow for some years.
