= Herbert Moss =

Scottish politician (1883–1956)

Captain Herbert James Moss (22 February 1883 – 1956) was a British sailor, Army officer, and Scottish Unionist Party politician. He was the member of parliament (MP) for Rutherglen from 1931 to 1935.

Apprenticed to a ship as a boy, Moss received his master's certificate before the age of thirty. During the First World War, he was with the Royal Engineers and commander of a unit in East Africa. He then headed commercial houses in Glasgow and was a member of the Glasgow Corporation from 1927 to 1930.

After unsuccessfully contesting Glasgow Shettleston in 1929 and Rutherglen in the 1931 Rutherglen by-election, he was returned for Rutherglen later that year.

In 1934, he, alongside William Paterson Templeton MP and former Glasgow town councillor Thomas MacKenzie, were convicted of contravening the Lotteries Act 1710 in connection with the Modern School of Art Union Cesarewitch draw. As the alleged ringleader of the scheme Moss was sentenced to a £50 fine (equivalent to £3,094 in 2025) or three months' imprisonment. Moss claimed that the breach was a technical one and vowed to clear his name. In January 1935, the Rutherglen Unionist Association passed a resolution calling on him to resign as MP.

He published his memoirs, Windjammer to Westminster, in 1941.

Parliament of the United Kingdom
Preceded by David Hardie	Member of Parliament for Rutherglen; 1931 – 1935	Succeeded by Allan Chapman
