= William Wright (Scottish politician) =

Scottish Labour Party politician (1862–1931)

William Wright (1862 – 9 April 1931) was a Scottish Labour Party politician.

Born near Lincoln, Wright joined the Independent Labour Party, and began working for the party as a full-time organiser in South Wales in 1898. He later relocated to Scotland, where he became prominent in the co-operative movement.

Wright was elected at the 1922 general election as member of parliament (MP) for the Rutherglen constituency in Lanarkshire, and held the seat until his death in 1931, aged 68. The resulting by-election was won by the Labour candidate David Hardie.

In his spare time, Wright was a lay reader in the Anglican church, and wrote Agriculture and the Unemployed, and a book of poetry, Down Under.

Parliament of the United Kingdom
Preceded by Adam Keir Rodger	Member of Parliament for Rutherglen; 1922–1931	Succeeded by David Hardie
