= David Hardie (politician) =

British politician (1870–1939)

David Hardie (ca. 1860 or 27 January 1871 – 8 April 1939) was a Labour Party politician in the United Kingdom.

A younger brother of Keir Hardie, David Hardie served in local politics for many years.

In 1931, aged about 70, he was selected to defend the Labour seat of Glasgow Rutherglen in a by-election, caused by the death of the sitting member William Wright. At the election in May 1931, Hardie narrowly held the seat by 883 votes in a straight fight with the Conservative candidate, Herbert James Moss.

Five months later, at the 1931 General Election, Hardie was swept aside in a landslide defeat, losing by over 5,000 votes to Moss. He never returned to Parliament and thus became one of the shortest-serving MPs of the 20th Century.

== See also ==
- List of United Kingdom MPs with the shortest service
- UK by-election records

Parliament of the United Kingdom
Preceded by William Wright	Member of Parliament for Rutherglen; May 1931 – 1931	Succeeded by Herbert James Moss
