= Rutherglen (UK Parliament constituency) =

UK Parliament constituency (1918–2005, 2024 onwards)

- Burgh constituency for the House of Commons
- Rutherglen shown within Scotland.
- Subdivisions of Scotland: South Lanarkshire
- Electorate: 71,612 (March 2020)
- Major settlements: Rutherglen, Cambuslang, Blantyre, Bothwell, Uddingston

Current constituency
- Created: 2024
- Member of Parliament: Michael Shanks (Labour)
- Seats: One
- Created from: Rutherglen and Hamilton West

1918–2005
- Seats: One
- Type of constituency: Burgh constituency
- Created from: Mid Lanarkshire
- Replaced by: Rutherglen and Hamilton West; Glasgow Central; Glasgow South

Rutherglen is a burgh constituency represented in the House of Commons of the Parliament of the United Kingdom. The seat first existed between 1918 and 2005 (known latterly as Glasgow Rutherglen) and was re-established under the final recommendations of the Boundary Commission for Scotland as part of the 2023 review of Westminster constituencies which came into effect for the 2024 general election. In the intervening period, the seat was largely replaced by Rutherglen and Hamilton West.

The seat has been held since 2024 by Michael Shanks of Scottish Labour. Shanks had been the MP for Rutherglen and Hamilton West since a by-election victory in 2023.

== Boundaries ==
Map of boundaries from 2024

1918–1949: "The burgh of Rutherglen and the parts of the Lower Ward and Middle Ward County Districts which are contained within the parishes of Carmunnock, Cambuslang, and Blantyre, and the extra-burghal portion of the parish of Rutherglen."

1950–1974: The Burgh of Rutherglen, and the eighth district [of Lanarkshire].

Map of the constituency in Lanarkshire electoral region, 1950 boundary

1974–1983: The Burgh of Rutherglen, and parts of the eighth and ninth districts.

1983–1997: The City of Glasgow District electoral divisions of Toryglen/Rutherglen, Glenwood/Fernhill, and Cambuslang/Halfway.

Under the Fifth Review of UK Parliament constituencies, the constituency was abolished and largely absorbed into Rutherglen and Hamilton West with small areas becoming parts of Glasgow Central and Glasgow South.

2024–present: The South Lanarkshire council wards of Blantyre, Bothwell and Uddingston, Cambuslang East, Cambuslang West, Rutherglen Central and North, and Rutherglen South.

The re-established constituency comprised the Rutherglen and Hamilton West constituency with the addition of Bothwell and Uddingston (previously in the abolished Lanark and Hamilton East constituency) and the loss of territory within Hamilton which was assigned to the new Hamilton and Clyde Valley constituency.

== Members of Parliament ==
=== MPs 1918–2005 ===
Election	Member	Party
1918	Adam Keir Rodger	Coalition Liberal
Jan 1922	Adam Keir Rodger	National Liberal
Nov 1922	William Wright	Labour
1931 by-election	David Hardie	Labour
1931	Herbert James Moss	Conservative
1935	Allan Chapman	Conservative
1945	Gilbert McAllister	Labour
1951	Richard Brooman-White	Conservative
1964 by-election	Gregor Mackenzie	Labour
1987	Tommy McAvoy	Labour Co-operative
2005	constituency abolished	

=== MPs 2024–present ===
Election	Member	Party
2024	Michael Shanks	Labour

== Elections ==
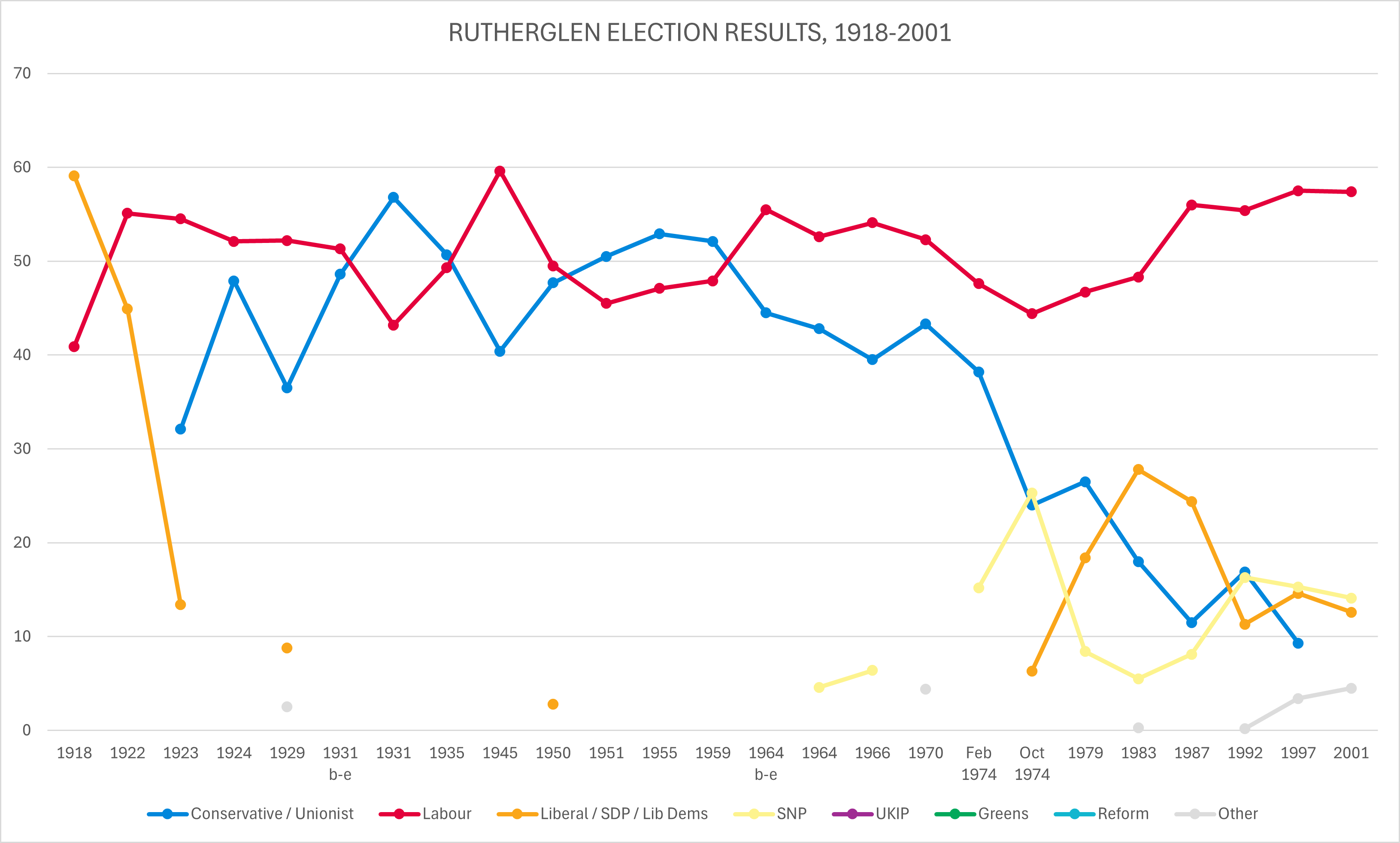
Election results 1918-2001

=== Elections in the 2020s ===
General election 2024: Rutherglen
Party	Candidate	Votes	%	±%
Labour	Michael Shanks	21,460	50.5	+19.3
SNP	Katy Loudon	12,693	29.9	−13.2
Reform	David Stark	2,685	6.3	New
Conservative	Gary Burns	2,420	5.7	−11.6
Liberal Democrats	Gloria Adebo	1,714	4.0	−3.2
Scottish Socialist	Bill Bonnar	541	1.3	New
Alba	Jim Eadie	497	1.2	New
Scottish Family	John McArthur	321	0.8	New
Independent	Andrew Daly	153	0.4	New
Majority		8,767	20.6	N/A
Turnout		42,484	58.5	−9.9
Registered electors		72,674		
Labour gain from SNP		Swing	+16.2	

=== Elections in the 2010s ===
2019 notional result (Note: Estimate of the 2019 general election result as if the revised boundaries recommended under the 2023 boundary review were in place)
Party	Vote	%
SNP	21,127	43.1
Labour	15,272	31.2
Conservative	8,462	17.3
Liberal Democrats	3,526	7.2
UKIP	629	1.3
Majority	5,855	11.9
Turnout	49,016	68.4
Electorate	71,612	

=== Elections in the 2000s ===
General election 2001: Glasgow Rutherglen
Party	Candidate	Votes	%	±%
Labour Co-op	Tommy McAvoy	16,760	57.4	−0.1
SNP	Anne McLaughlin	4,135	14.1	−1.2
Liberal Democrats	David Jackson	3,689	12.6	−1.9
Conservative	Malcolm MacAskill	3,301	11.3	+2.0
Scottish Socialist	Bill Bonnar	1,328	4.5	+3.8
Majority		12,625	43.3	+1.1
Turnout		29,213	56.3	−13.8
Registered electors		51,855		
Labour hold		Swing	+0.5	

=== Elections in the 1990s ===
General election 1997: Glasgow Rutherglen
Party	Candidate	Votes	%	±%
Labour Co-op	Tommy McAvoy	20,430	57.52	+4.14
SNP	Ian Gray	5,423	15.27	−0.31
Liberal Democrats	Robert Brown	5,167	14.55	+2.89
Conservative	David Campbell Bannerman	3,288	9.26	−9.90
Independent Labour	George Easton	812	2.29	New
Scottish Socialist	Rosie Kane	251	0.71	New
Referendum	Julia Kerr	150	0.42	New
Majority		15,007	42.25	+3.75
Turnout		35,521	70.10	−5.12
Registered electors		50,673		
Labour hold		Swing	+2.22	

General election 1992: Glasgow Rutherglen
Party	Candidate	Votes	%	±%
Labour Co-op	Tommy McAvoy	21,962	55.38	−0.63
Conservative	Brian Cooklin	6,692	16.88	+5.38
SNP	John Higgins	6,470	16.32	+8.22
Liberal Democrats	David Baillie	4,470	11.27	−13.12
International Communist Party	Barbara Slaughter	62	0.16	New
Majority		15,270	38.50	+6.88
Turnout		39,656	75.22	−2.00
Registered electors		52,719		
Labour hold		Swing	-3.01	

=== Elections in the 1980s ===
General election 1987: Glasgow Rutherglen
Party	Candidate	Votes	%	±%
Labour Co-op	Tommy McAvoy	24,790	56.01	+7.67
Liberal	Robert Brown	10,795	24.39	−3.44
Conservative	Graeme Hamilton	5,088	11.50	−6.52
SNP	John Higgins	3,584	8.10	+2.62
Majority		13,995	31.62	+11.11
Turnout		44,257	77.22	+2.07
Registered electors		57,313		
Labour hold		Swing	+5.56	

General election 1983: Glasgow Rutherglen
Party	Candidate	Votes	%	±%
Labour	Gregor Mackenzie	21,510	48.34	−2.40
Liberal	Robert Brown	12,384	27.83	+11.18
Conservative	Helen Hodgins	8,017	18.02	−5.15
SNP	Kenneth Fee	2,438	5.48	−3.79
Workers Revolutionary	Christopher Corrigan	148	0.33	New
Majority		9,126	20.51	+0.31
Turnout		44,497	75.15	−5.27
Registered electors		59,209		
Labour hold		Swing	-6.79	

=== Elections in the 1970s ===
General election 1979: Rutherglen
Party	Candidate	Votes	%	±%
Labour	Gregor Mackenzie	18,546	46.70	+2.31
Conservative	Paul Burns	10,523	26.50	+2.47
Liberal	Robert Brown	7,315	18.42	+12.12
SNP	Michael Grieve	3,325	8.37	−16.91
Majority		8,023	20.20	+1.09
Turnout		39,709	80.42	+1.58
Registered electors		49,379		
Labour hold		Swing	-0.08	

General election October 1974: Rutherglen
Party	Candidate	Votes	%	±%
Labour	Gregor Mackenzie	17,099	44.39	−3.19
SNP	Ian Ogilvie Bayne	9,732	25.28	+10.04
Conservative	John Thomson	9,248	24.03	−13.14
Liberal	Robert Brown	2,424	6.30	New
Majority		7,356	19.11	+8.70
Turnout		38,492	78.84	−3.78
Registered electors		48,824		
Labour hold		Swing	-6.61	

General election February 1974: Rutherglen
Party	Candidate	Votes	%	±%
Labour	Gregor Mackenzie	19,005	47.58	−4.70
Conservative	John Thomson	14,852	38.17	−6.16
SNP	Louisa Leslie	6,089	15.24	New
Majority		4,153	10.41	+1.46
Turnout		39,946	82.62	+3.11
Registered electors		48,351		
Labour hold		Swing	+0.73	

General election 1970: Rutherglen
Party	Candidate	Votes	%	±%
Labour	Gregor Mackenzie	17,751	52.28	−1.82
Conservative	Peter C Hutchison	14,710	43.33	+3.80
Independent Scottish Nationalist	David H Livingstone	1,490	4.39	New
Majority		3,041	8.95	−5.62
Turnout		33,951	79.51	−4.71
Registered electors		42,702		
Labour hold		Swing	-2.81	

=== Elections in the 1960s ===
General election 1966: Rutherglen
Party	Candidate	Votes	%	±%
Labour	Gregor Mackenzie	18,621	54.10	+1.50
Conservative	John H Young	13,607	39.53	−3.27
SNP	Andrew Peacock	2,194	6.37	+1.77
Majority		5,014	14.57	+4.77
Turnout		34,422	84.22	−2.00
Registered electors		40,870		
Labour hold		Swing	+2.39	

General election 1964: Rutherglen
Party	Candidate	Votes	%	±%
Labour	Gregor Mackenzie	18,943	52.60	+4.67
Unionist	Iain Sproat	15,413	42.80	−9.27
SNP	Robert N Armstrong	1,657	4.60	New
Majority		3,530	9.80	N/A
Turnout		36,013	86.22	+0.37
Registered electors		41,771		
Labour gain from Unionist		Swing	+6.97	

1964 Rutherglen by-election
Party	Candidate	Votes	%	±%
Labour	Gregor Mackenzie	18,885	55.51	+7.58
Unionist	Iain Sproat	15,138	44.49	−7.58
Majority		3,747	11.02	N/A
Turnout		34,023		
Labour gain from Unionist		Swing	+7.6	

=== Elections in the 1950s ===
General election 1959: Rutherglen
Party	Candidate	Votes	%	±%
Unionist	Richard Brooman-White	19,146	52.07	−0.83
Labour	Eddie Milne	17,624	47.93	+0.83
Majority		1,522	4.14	−1.67
Turnout		36,770	85.85	+1.74
Registered electors		42,833		
Unionist hold		Swing	-0.83	

General election 1955: Rutherglen
Party	Candidate	Votes	%	±%
Unionist	Richard Brooman-White	19,141	52.90	+2.45
Labour	Gilbert McAllister	17,040	47.10	−2.45
Majority		2,101	5.80	+4.90
Turnout		36,181	84.11	−3.63
Registered electors		43,016		
Unionist hold		Swing	+2.45	

General election 1951: Rutherglen
Party	Candidate	Votes	%	±%
Unionist	Richard Brooman-White	19,554	50.45	+2.76
Labour	Gilbert McAllister	19,202	49.55	+0.02
Majority		352	0.90	N/A
Turnout		38,756	87.74	+1.65
Registered electors		44,173		
Unionist gain from Labour		Swing	+1.37	

General election 1950: Rutherglen
Party	Candidate	Votes	%	±%
Labour	Gilbert McAllister	18,779	49.53	−10.12
Unionist	Richard Brooman-White	18,084	47.69	+7.34
Liberal	Christian Beveridge Goodfellow	1,055	2.78	New
Majority		695	1.83	−17.46
Turnout		37,918	86.09	+1.65
Registered electors		44,044		
Labour hold		Swing	-8.73	

=== Elections in the 1940s ===
General election 1945: Rutherglen
Party	Candidate	Votes	%	±%
Labour	Gilbert McAllister	24,738	59.65	+10.36
Unionist	Allan Chapman	16,736	40.35	−10.36
Majority		8,002	19.30	N/A
Turnout		41,474	76.55	−3.44
Registered electors		54,180		
Labour gain from Unionist		Swing	+10.36	

=== Elections in the 1930s ===
General election 1935: Rutherglen
Party	Candidate	Votes	%	±%
Unionist	Allan Chapman	20,712	50.71	−6.10
Labour	David Hardie	20,131	49.29	+6.10
Majority		581	1.42	−12.20
Turnout		40,843	79.99	−1.62
Registered electors		51,063		
Unionist hold		Swing	-6.10	

General election 1931: Rutherglen
Party	Candidate	Votes	%	±%
Unionist	Herbert Moss	22,185	56.81	+20.3
Labour	David Hardie	16,866	43.19	−9.0
Majority		5,319	13.62	N/A
Turnout		39,051	81.61	+5.9
Registered electors		47,848		
Unionist gain from Labour		Swing	+14.65	

Rutherglen by-election, 1931
Party	Candidate	Votes	%	±%
Labour	David Hardie	16,736	51.3	−0.9
Unionist	Herbert Moss	15,853	48.6	+12.1
Majority		883	2.7	−13.0
Turnout		32,589	69.6	−6.1
Labour hold		Swing	-5.7	

=== Elections in the 1920s ===
General election 1929: Rutherglen
Party	Candidate	Votes	%	±%
Labour	William Wright	17,538	52.2	+0.1
Unionist	Arthur Patterson Duffes	12,249	36.5	−11.4
Liberal	James MacDougall	2,945	8.8	New
Communist	Alex Moffat	842	2.5	New
Majority		5,289	15.7	+11.5
Turnout		33,574	75.7	−4.4
Registered electors		44,378		
Labour hold		Swing	+5.8	

General election 1924: Rutherglen
Party	Candidate	Votes	%	±%
Labour	William Wright	13,796	52.1	−2.4
Unionist	Robert McLaren	12,707	47.9	+15.8
Majority		1,089	4.2	−18.2
Turnout		26,503	80.1	+7.8
Registered electors		33,081		
Labour hold		Swing	−9.1	

General election 1923: Rutherglen
Party	Candidate	Votes	%	±%
Labour	William Wright	13,021	54.5	−0.6
Unionist	Robert McLaren	7,652	32.1	New
Liberal	John Taylor	3,201	13.4	−31.5
Majority		5,369	22.4	+12.2
Turnout		23,874	72.3	−6.1
Registered electors		33,007		
Labour hold		Swing	+15.5	

General election 1922: Rutherglen
Party	Candidate	Votes	%	±%
Labour	William Wright	14,029	55.1	+14.2
National Liberal	John Train	11,440	44.9	−14.2
Majority		2,589	10.2	N/A
Turnout		25,469	78.4	+21.4
Registered electors		32,487		
Labour gain from National Liberal		Swing	+14.2	

=== Elections in the 1910s ===
General election 1918: Rutherglen
Party		Candidate	Votes	%
C	Coalition Liberal	Adam Keir Rodger	12,641	59.1
	Labour	William Regan	8,759	40.9
Majority			3,882	18.2
Turnout			21,400	57.0
Registered electors			37,518	
	National Liberal win (new seat)			
C indicates candidate endorsed by the coalition government.

== See also ==
- Rutherglen (Scottish Parliament constituency)
- Rutherglen (Parliament of Scotland constituency)
