= 1931 Rutherglen by-election =

UK parliamentary by-election

The 1931 Rutherglen by-election was held on 21 May 1931. The by-election was held due to the death of the incumbent Labour MP, William Wright. It was won by the Labour candidate David Hardie

Wright had held the seat since 1922 when he had gained it for Labour from the Unionist Party. His majority over the Unionists at the 1929 election had been over 5,000 votes, an increase from 1,089 votes in 1924. In addition to Labour and the Unionists, both the Liberal Party and the Communist Party of Great Britain had contested the seat in 1929, polling less than 4,000 votes between them.

Labour's candidate David Hardie, was the brother of Labour's founder Keir Hardie, and George Hardie, who was then serving as MP for Glasgow Springburn. His sole opponent was the Unionist Party's Captain H. J. Moss who campaigned on the central issue of "the prosperity policy of safeguarding British industries".

Rutherglen by-election, 1931
| Party | Candidate | Votes | % | ±% |
|---|---|---|---|---|
| Labour | David Hardie | 16,736 | 51.3 | −0.9 |
| Unionist | Herbert Moss | 15,853 | 48.6 | +12.1 |
| Majority | | 883 | 2.7 | −13.0 |
| Turnout | | 32,589 | 69.6 | −6.1 |
| Registered electors | | 46,804 | | |
| Labour hold | | Swing | −5.7 | |

While Hardie held the seat for Labour, the Party's majority was significantly reduced. The general election a few months later saw a rematch between the two candidates, with Moss emerging victorious with a majority of over 5,000.
