= Tom Greatrex =

British Labour Co-op politician

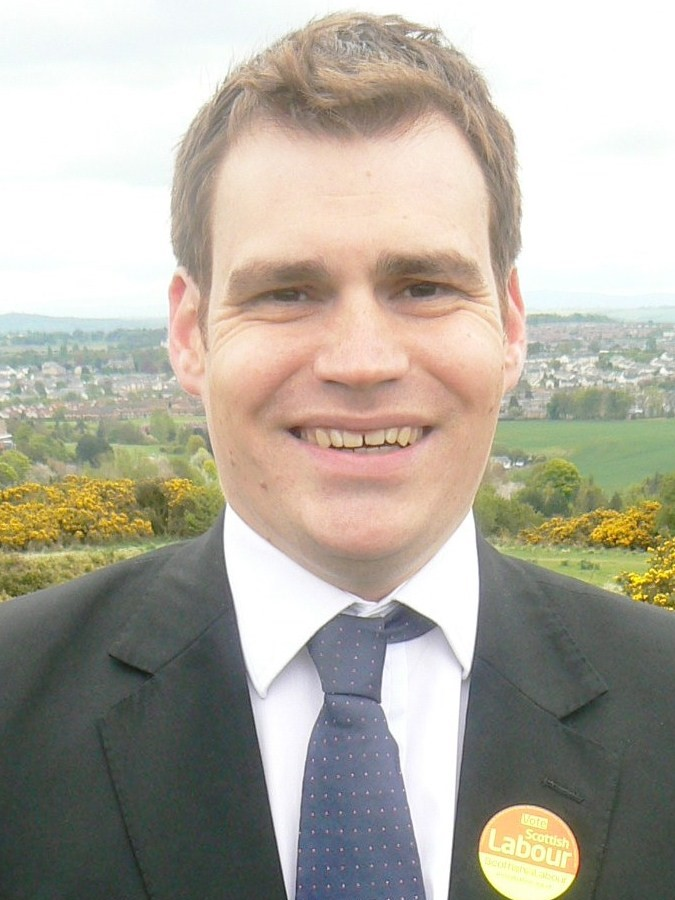
- Greatrex in 2010

Shadow Minister for Energy
- In office 7 October 2011 – 8 May 2015
- Leader: Ed Miliband
- Preceded by: Huw Irranca-Davies
- Succeeded by: Barry Gardiner

Shadow Minister for Scotland
- In office 8 October 2010 – 7 October 2011
- Leader: Ed Miliband
- Preceded by: Ann McKechin
- Succeeded by: Willie Bain

Member of Parliament for Rutherglen and Hamilton West
- In office 6 May 2010 – 30 March 2015
- Preceded by: Tommy McAvoy
- Succeeded by: Margaret Ferrier

Personal details
- Born: Thomas James Greatrex; 30 September 1974 (age 52) Ashford, Kent, England
- Party: Labour Co-op
- Spouse: Laura Orrock
- Children: 2
- Education: London School of Economics
- Website: tomgreatrex.org

Thomas James Greatrex (born 30 September 1974) is a British Labour Co-op politician, who was the Member of Parliament (MP) for Rutherglen and Hamilton West between 2010 and 2015 and the Shadow Energy Minister from 2011 to 2015.

In 2016 Greatrex became the CEO of the Nuclear Industry Association.

== Early life ==
Greatrex was born in Ashford, Kent. Brought up in Tunbridge Wells, he attended The Judd School between 1986 and 1993, before studying Economics, Government, and Law at the London School of Economics, graduating in 1996.

He lives in Cambuslang and is married, with twin daughters.

== Career ==
Greatrex worked as a researcher to Opposition Chief Whip Donald Dewar, prior to the 1997 General Election, remaining in the role after Nick Brown took over as Chief Whip, later moving with him to the Ministry of Agriculture, Fisheries and Food in 1998. He left this role in 1999 to work as a GMB Union official for five years. He moved to Scotland in 2004 to take on a role as a chief officer at East Dunbartonshire Council then worked as Director of Corporate Affairs for NHS 24 between 2006 and 2007. He latterly worked as a policy adviser for Scottish Secretaries Douglas Alexander, Des Browne and Jim Murphy.

Since 1 February 2016 Greatrex has been CEO of the Nuclear Industry Association. He is currently vice-chairman of the Football Supporters Association.

== Political career ==
Selected as the Scottish Labour Party candidate for Rutherglen and Hamilton West, Greatrex was elected with a majority of 21,002 at the 2010 United Kingdom general election.

He was the Shadow Under-Secretary of State for Scotland supporting Ann McKechin, Shadow Secretary State for Scotland until October 2011, when he was made Shadow Energy Minister.

As Shadow Energy Minister, Greatrex has criticised both sides of the debate over fracking, arguing that an "evidence-based" approach is needed and that whilst shale gas will not solve energy shortages in future, there might be some role for fracking under "strict regulation".

He lost his Westminster seat to Margaret Ferrier of the Scottish National Party at the 2015 general election, she was elected with a majority of 9,975 votes.

== Political activities ==
Greatrex is a fierce and outspoken critic of the firm Atos, who conduct Work Capability Assessments of disabled people on behalf of the Department for Work and Pensions. On 17 May 2013, he gave an interview to the BBC about allegations made by a doctor employed by Atos that the tests are unfair and 'skewed against the claimant'. In addition, he wrote in a letter to the Prime Minister that these were "serious and shocking allegations which must be urgently looked at".

Parliament of the United Kingdom
Preceded by Tommy McAvoy	Member of Parliament for Rutherglen & Hamilton West; 2010–2015	Succeeded by Margaret Ferrier
