= Allan Chapman (politician) =

Scottish politician (1897–1966)

Member of Parliament for Rutherglen
- In office 14 November 1935 – 15 June 1945
- Preceded by: Herbert Moss
- Succeeded by: Gilbert McAllister

Personal details
- Born: 18 March 1897
- Died: 7 January 1966 (aged 68) Dundee, Scotland, United Kingdom
- Party: Unionist

Allan Chapman (18 March 1897 – 7 January 1966) was a Scottish Unionist Party politician.

Chapman was the son of H. Williams Chapman and attended Queens' College, Cambridge. He was elected at the 1935 general election as Member of Parliament (MP) for the Rutherglen constituency in Lanarkshire. He held the seat during the war years, but at the 1945 general election he was defeated by the Labour Party candidate Gilbert McAllister.

In the war-time coalition government, he was Assistant Postmaster-General from March 1941 to March 1942, and then Under-Secretary of State for Scotland until the coalition government was dissolved in May 1945. In the subsequent caretaker government he then shared the post with Thomas Dunlop Galbraith until the new Labour Government took office at the end of July.

He was married to Beatrice Cox. He died at Dundee Royal Infirmary, age 68.

Parliament of the United Kingdom
| Preceded by Herbert Moss | Member of Parliament for Rutherglen; 1935–1945 | Succeeded by Gilbert McAllister |
Political offices
| Preceded by Charles Waterhouse | Assistant Postmaster-General; 1941–1942 | Succeeded by Robert Grimston |
| Preceded by Joseph Westwood | Under-Secretary of State for Scotland; 1942 – July 1945; With: Thomas Dunlop Galbraith from May 1945 | Succeeded by George Buchanan and Tom Fraser |
