= Rutherglen and Hamilton West =

UK Parliament constituency (2005–2024)

Coordinates: 55.820°N 4.175°W

- Former burgh constituency for the House of Commons
- Boundary of Rutherglen and Hamilton West in Scotland
- Subdivision: South Lanarkshire
- Major settlements: Blantyre, Burnbank, Burnside, Cambuslang, Hillhouse, Newton, Rutherglen

2005–2024
- Created from: Glasgow Rutherglen and Hamilton South
- Replaced by: Rutherglen

Rutherglen and Hamilton West was a burgh constituency of the House of Commons of the Parliament of the United Kingdom, which was created for the 2005 general election. It covered almost all of the former constituency of Glasgow Rutherglen and most of the former constituency of Hamilton South, and it elected one member of parliament (MP) by the first-past-the-post voting system.

Margaret Ferrier won the seat at the 2019 snap general election for the Scottish National Party; she had previously held the seat from 2015 to 2017. Ferrier had the SNP whip withdrawn on 1 October 2020 after a breach of COVID-19 pandemic regulations, and sat as an independent from that date onward.

In June 2023, Ferrier was handed a 30-day suspension from the Commons for her actions, triggering a recall petition which ran until 31 July 2023. On 1 August, South Lanarkshire Council confirmed the recall petition had been successful, as more than 10% of the Rutherglen and Hamilton West electorate had signed. As a result, Ferrier lost her seat and the seat immediately became vacant. A by-election was held on 5 October to elect a new Member of Parliament, won by Labour's Michael Shanks.

Historically a safe Labour seat, in 2015 it was gained by the Scottish National Party, when they won a record 56 of the 59 Scottish seats in the House of Commons; ending 51 years of Labour Party dominance at UK general elections in Scotland. Two years later, at the 2017 general election, the seat was taken back by Labour by just 265 votes. Coincidentally in the neighbouring Lanark and Hamilton East, sitting MP Angela Crawley held her seat by just 266 votes.

Further to the completion of the 2023 periodic review of Westminster constituencies, the seat was abolished. Subject to boundary changes entailing the loss of "Hamilton West" (assigned to a new Hamilton and Clyde Valley constituency), it reverted to the name of Rutherglen, and was first contested at the 2024 general election.

== Boundaries ==
Map of boundaries 2005–2024

The Rutherglen and Hamilton West constituency covered part of the South Lanarkshire council area. The rest of the council area was covered by the Dumfriesshire, Clydesdale and Tweeddale, East Kilbride, Strathaven and Lesmahagow and Lanark and Hamilton East constituencies. The Dumfriesshire, Clydesdale and Tweeddale constituency also covered part of the Dumfries and Galloway council area and part of the Scottish Borders council area.

The terms of the Rutherglen and Hamilton West name refer to the town of Rutherglen and the west of the town of Hamilton.

The constituency was composed of the electoral wards:

- In full: Blantyre, Cambuslang East, Cambuslang West, Rutherglen Central and North, Rutherglen South.
- In part: Hamilton North and East, Hamilton South, Hamilton West and Earnock.

== Constituency profile ==
Rutherglen and Hamilton West was an urban seat in Greater Glasgow. It contained commuter areas into the city of Glasgow, with train travel times as short as 15 minutes from the city centre.

The seat can be understood as socially divided, and it contains many areas of high deprivation, particularly on the outskirts of Rutherglen, eastern Cambuslang, Blantyre and western Hamilton; however, parts of central Rutherglen, western Cambuslang and the Earnock area of Hamilton have markedly lower rates of deprivation.

The seat itself voted approximately 62% in favour of remaining within the European Union in the 2016 Brexit referendum and voters in the constituency voted approximately 50% No, 50% Yes in the 2014 Scottish independence referendum. Historically dominated by Labour, Margaret Ferrier of the SNP gained the seat for the party for the first time in 2015, lost the seat to Labour in 2017, before regaining it in 2019 with an increased majority. The seat was regarded as an important battleground constituency between Labour and the SNP, having changed hands three times in the past 10 years.

At the 2022 South Lanarkshire Council election, Low Blantyre and the Bankhead and Fernhill areas of Rutherglen voted Labour, while the Burnside area of Rutherglen voted Liberal Democrat, and the rest of the constituency voted SNP.

Overall, the town of Rutherglen was the SNP's poorest performing area, Blantyre was Labour and the SNP's best performing area, and Cambuslang and Hamilton sat close to the constituency average.

== Members of Parliament ==
| Election | Member | Party |
|---|---|---|
| 2005 | Tommy McAvoy | Labour Co-op |
| 2010 | Tom Greatrex | Labour Co-op |
| 2015 | Margaret Ferrier | SNP |
| 2017 | Gerard Killen | Labour Co-op |
| 2019 | Margaret Ferrier | SNP |
| 2020 | Margaret Ferrier | Independent |
| 2023 by-election | Michael Shanks | Labour Co-op |

== Elections ==
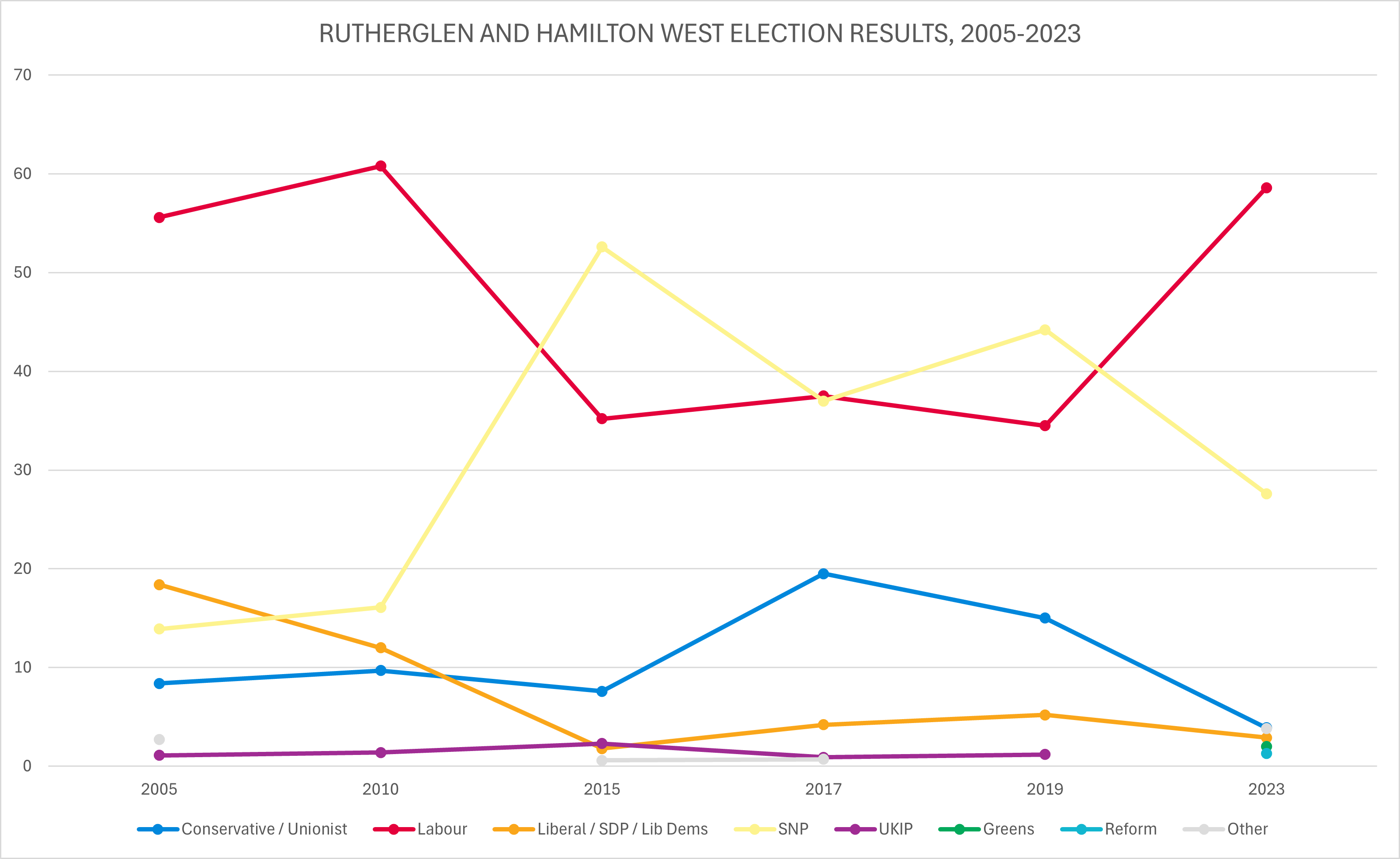
Election results 2005-2023

=== Elections in the 2020s ===
2023 Rutherglen and Hamilton West by-election
| Party | Candidate | Votes | % | ±% |
|---|---|---|---|---|
| Labour Co-op | Michael Shanks | 17,845 | 58.6 | +24.1 |
| SNP | Katy Loudon | 8,399 | 27.6 | −16.6 |
| Conservative | Thomas Kerr | 1,192 | 3.9 | −11.1 |
| Liberal Democrats | Gloria Adebo | 895 | 2.9 | −2.3 |
| Green | Cameron Eadie | 601 | 2.0 | New |
| Reform | David Stark | 403 | 1.3 | New |
| Scottish Family | Niall Fraser | 319 | 1.0 | New |
| Scottish Socialist | Bill Bonnar | 271 | 0.9 | New |
| ISP | Colette Walker | 207 | 0.7 | New |
| TUSC | Christopher Sermanni | 178 | 0.6 | New |
| Independent | Andrew Daly | 81 | 0.3 | New |
| Volt | Ewan Hoyle | 46 | 0.2 | New |
| No description | Prince Ankit Love, Emperor of India | 34 | 0.1 | New |
| No description | Garry Cooke | 6 | 0.0 | New |
| Majority | | 9,446 | 31.0 | N/A |
| Turnout | | 30,477 | 37.2 | −29.3 |
| Labour Co-op gain from SNP | | Swing | +20.4 | |

=== Elections in the 2010s ===
General election 2019: Rutherglen and Hamilton West
| Party | Candidate | Votes | % | ±% |
|---|---|---|---|---|
| SNP | Margaret Ferrier | 23,775 | 44.2 | +7.2 |
| Labour Co-op | Ged Killen | 18,545 | 34.5 | −3.0 |
| Conservative | Lynne Nailon | 8,054 | 15.0 | −4.5 |
| Liberal Democrats | Mark McGeever | 2,791 | 5.2 | +1.0 |
| UKIP | Janice MacKay | 629 | 1.2 | +0.3 |
| Majority | | 5,230 | 9.7 | N/A |
| Turnout | | 53,794 | 66.5 | +3.0 |
| SNP gain from Labour Co-op | | Swing | +5.1 | |

General election 2017: Rutherglen and Hamilton West
| Party | Candidate | Votes | % | ±% |
|---|---|---|---|---|
| Labour Co-op | Ged Killen | 19,101 | 37.5 | +2.3 |
| SNP | Margaret Ferrier | 18,836 | 37.0 | −15.6 |
| Conservative | Ann Le Blond | 9,941 | 19.5 | +11.9 |
| Liberal Democrats | Robert Brown | 2,158 | 4.2 | +2.4 |
| UKIP | Caroline Santos | 465 | 0.9 | −1.4 |
| Independent | Andy Dixon | 371 | 0.7 | New |
| Majority | | 265 | 0.5 | N/A |
| Turnout | | 50,872 | 63.5 | −5.1 |
| Labour Co-op gain from SNP | | Swing | +8.9 | |

General election 2015: Rutherglen and Hamilton West
| Party | Candidate | Votes | % | ±% |
|---|---|---|---|---|
| SNP | Margaret Ferrier | 30,279 | 52.6 | +36.5 |
| Labour Co-op | Tom Greatrex | 20,304 | 35.2 | −25.6 |
| Conservative | Taylor Muir | 4,350 | 7.6 | −2.1 |
| UKIP | Janice Mackay | 1,301 | 2.3 | +0.9 |
| Liberal Democrats | Tony Hughes | 1,045 | 1.8 | −10.2 |
| CISTA | Yvonne Maclean | 336 | 0.6 | New |
| Majority | | 9,975 | 17.4 | N/A |
| Turnout | | 57,615 | 69.6 | +8.1 |
| SNP gain from Labour Co-op | | Swing | +31.1 | |

General election 2010: Rutherglen and Hamilton West
| Party | Candidate | Votes | % | ±% |
|---|---|---|---|---|
| Labour Co-op | Tom Greatrex | 28,566 | 60.8 | +5.2 |
| SNP | Graeme Horne | 7,564 | 16.1 | +2.2 |
| Liberal Democrats | Ian Robertson | 5,636 | 12.0 | −6.4 |
| Conservative | Malcolm Macaskill | 4,540 | 9.7 | +1.3 |
| UKIP | Janice Murdoch | 675 | 1.4 | +0.3 |
| Majority | | 21,002 | 44.7 | +7.5 |
| Turnout | | 46,981 | 61.5 | +3.0 |
| Labour Co-op hold | | Swing | +1.5 | |

=== Elections in the 2000s ===
General election 2005: Rutherglen and Hamilton West
| Party | Candidate | Votes | % | ±% |
|---|---|---|---|---|
| Labour Co-op | Tommy McAvoy | 24,054 | 55.6 | −4.1 |
| Liberal Democrats | Ian Robertson | 7,942 | 18.4 | +6.7 |
| SNP | Margaret Park | 6,023 | 13.9 | −1.3 |
| Conservative | Peter Crerar | 3,621 | 8.4 | −0.2 |
| Scottish Socialist | Bill Bonnar | 1,164 | 2.7 | −1.9 |
| UKIP | Janice Murdoch | 457 | 1.1 | +0.9 |
| Majority | | 16,112 | 37.2 | |
| Turnout | | 43,261 | 58.5 | |
| Labour Co-op win (new seat) | | | | |
