= Bill Bonnar =

Scottish politician

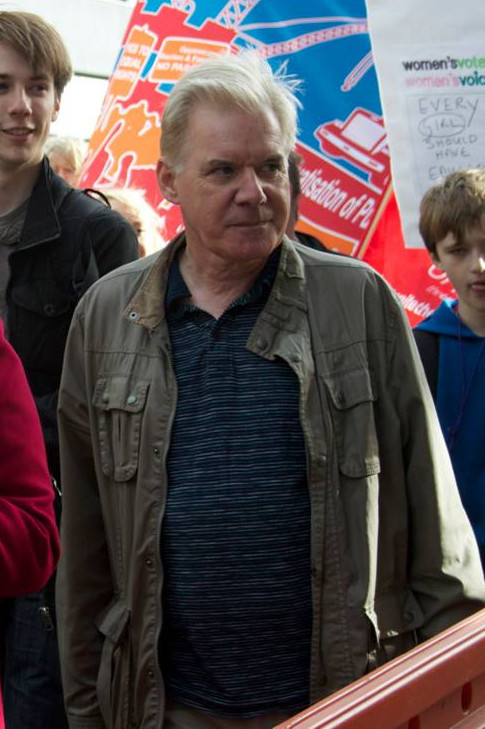
- At a Scottish Trades Union Congress rally in October 2014.
- Political party: Scottish Socialist Party

Bill Bonnar is a founding member of the Scottish Socialist Party.

== Personal life ==
A socialist activist for over forty years in Scotland, London, and Sudan, Bonnar has wide-ranging experience in the trade union movement and community politics. He worked as an aid worker in Sudan before the 1989 coup, and has worked full-time in the field of Community Development and Social and Economic Regeneration for the past 25 years.

He worked for two years as a Community Worker in South Lanarkshire, seven years as Development Officer with housing associations in Glasgow and South Lanarkshire, including Govan Housing Association, and five years as a Social Enterprise Advisor with Glasgow Regeneration Agency.

Bonnar has a degree in Politics and History from the University of Stirling. He is married to Vivienne and they have two daughters, Jenny and Katie (who has also been active in the SSP).

== Political career ==
At some point, Bonnar served on the editorial committee of Marxism Today, a theoretical magazine generally seen as the standard-bearer for the "reformist" wing of the CPGB.

While in London, Bonnar worked for left-wing bookshop Central Books, and was chairperson of the Connolly Association's London South branch. He has held various trade union positions in Glasgow and London. During his time as an aid worker in Sudan, he was an active member of the then-legal Sudanese Communist Party in Darfur and Khartoum.

In 1996, he was a founding member of the Scottish Socialist Alliance (SSA) and stood as its candidate in Glasgow Anniesland in the 1997 general election. He became a founding member of the Scottish Socialist Party in 1998, and stood as the candidate for Glasgow Rutherglen in the 2003 Scottish Parliament election, where he won 2,259 votes (9.6%). He contested the newly-drawn Rutherglen and Hamilton West seat at the 2005 United Kingdom general election for the Scottish Socialist Party (SSP), but failed to be elected. Bonnar finished in fifth place with 1,164 votes and a vote share of 2.7%.

Among other community work, Bonnar spearheaded a successful effort to commemorate ten volunteers from Rutherglen and Cambuslang who fought in the Spanish Civil War as part of the International Brigades with a plaque in Rutherglen Town Hall.

Bonnar was re-elected as the Scottish Socialist Party's co-chair alongside Frances Curran at its 2014 conference. At the party's 2015 conference six months later, he stood down as co-chair and was returned unopposed as National Secretary, taking over from Kevin McVey. He was also his party's unsuccessful nominee for Glasgow South West at the 2015 general election.

He was the SSP's candidate in the Govan ward in Glasgow at the 2017 and 2022 Scottish local elections. He was their candidate in the 2023 by-election in Rutherglen and Hamilton West, where he finished 8th of 14 candidates with 271 votes (0.9%).

He will be the SSP's no. 3 candidate in the Glasgow regional list at the 2026 Scottish Parliament election.
